= List of monarchs of Hana =

Monarch of Hana
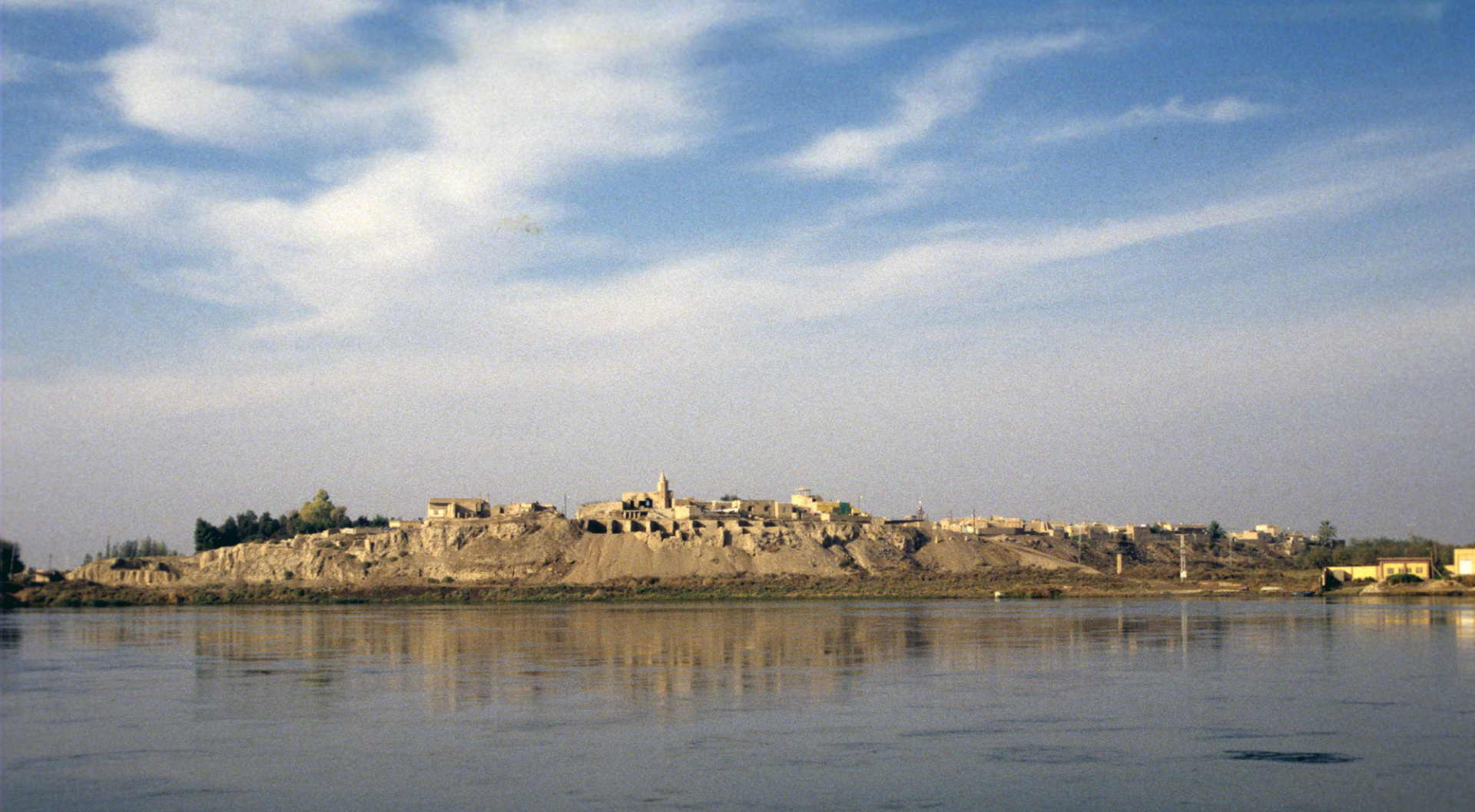
- Terqa might have been the capital of Hana

Details
- First monarch: Iapah-sumu-abu
- Last monarch: Pagiru
- Formation: c. 1760 BC
- Abolition: c. 1420 BC

Hana was located on the Euphrates River close to the junction of the Khabur River in what is now Syria and Iraq. Following the fall of Mari around 1760 BC, the 1st Kingdom formed. It was followed by the 2nd Kingdom, which emerged during the Middle Babylonian period.

== Monarchs of the 1st Kingdom ==
Name	Reign	Lifespan	Comments
Iapah-sumu-abu	c. 1755 BC		May be mentioned as an "Overseer of the Haneans" in a tablet in Alalakh during the time of Abban-El I of Yamhad
Isi-Sumuabi	c. 1735 BC		
Yadih-Abu	c. 1722 - c. 1718 BC	Died c. 1718 BC	Attested as defeated in Year 28 of Samsu-iluna of Babylon
Kastiliasu			His name is Kassite indicating he was not part of the royal succession, perhaps installed by Samsu-Iluna
Sunuhru-Ammu			
Ammi-madar			

== Monarchs of the 2nd Kingdom ==
Name	Reign	Lifespan	Comments
Iddin-Kakka			
Isar-Lim			
Iggid-Lim			
Isih-Dagan			
Ahuni			
Hammurabi			
Qis-Addu	c. 1420 BC		Was a contemporary with the Mitannian kings Parattarna/Parittarna, Sausadatra, and Saitarna
Pagiru	c. 1420 BC		
