= Yadih-Abu =

Bronze Age king of Hana

Yadih-Abu, Iadih-Abu

King of Ḫana
- Reign: 10+ years 17xx-1722? BC; Early Hana period Old Babylonian period Middle Bronze Age
- Predecessor: Isi-Sumuabi
- Successor: Kashtiliashu

Yadih-Abu (also written as Yadikh-Abu; Iadih-Abum) was in the Middle Bronze Age/Old Babylonian period a king of Terqa and king of the land of H̬ana. He was the son and successor of king Isi-Sumuabi.

== Reign ==
Yadih-Abu (E4.23.3) inherited from his predecessor a kingdom along the Euphrates and the Khabur that could well be compared with that of the destroyed city of Mari.

At Tell Taban (Ṭābatum), a number of clay tablets mention him and about ten year-names of him are known from which building activities in Araite, Ṭābatum (Tell Taban), Dunnum and Terqa are evident. At the end of his reign he came into conflict with Samsu-iluna who took over Haradum in the south around his 25th regnal year and in his 28th year claims to have defeated Yadih-abu. It seems that this put an end to the independence of Hana for the time being. Yadih-abu was succeeded by one Kaštiliašu, a person with a clearly Kassite name who did not belong to the house of Puzurum and was probably no more than a deputy of Samsu-iluna.

=== Defeated by Samsu-Iluna ===
He is mentioned in the 28th, 29th, 30th and 31st years names of Samsu-Iluna of Babylon (r. 1749-1712 BCE).

Year 28 of Samsu-Iluna (1722 BC): Year in which Samsu-iluna the king by the command of Enlil, by the wisdom and strength given by Marduk, crushed like a mountain with his terrifying szita-weapon and his mace the hostile kings Iadihabum and Mutihurszan/Mutihursag.

Year 29 of Samsu-Iluna: Year after the year in which Samsu-iluna the king by the command of Enlil crushed Iadihabum and Mutihurszan with his terrifying szita-weapon and the mace.

Year 30 of Samsu-Iluna: Second year after the year Samsu-iluna the king by the command of Enlil...

Year 31 of Samsu-Iluna: Third year after the year Samsu-iluna the king by the command of Enlil...

A possible attestation in year-names of Samsu-Iluna: P304806, P305547, P373079, P306893, P510251, P509829 (cuneiform administrative text) referring to Iadihabum and Mutihursag.

== Bibliography ==
- Buccellati (1988) Kingdom and Period of Khana https://www.terqa.org/EL-TQ/Buccellati_1988_Kingdom_and_Period_of_Khana_Part_1.pdf https://www.terqa.org/EL-TQ/Buccellati_1988_Kingdom_and_Period_of_Khana_Part_2.pdf
