= Isi-Sumuabi =

King of Ḫana
- Reign: x years (c. 1735 BC); 17xx-17xx BCE; Early Hana period Old Babylonian period Middle Bronze Age
- Predecessor: Yapah-Sumu[abu?]
- Successor: Yadih-Abu

Isi-Sumuabi or Iṣī-Sumuabu was king of Terqa and king of the land of H̬ana around 1735 BC, in the Early Hana period (c. 1750-1595 BC), the successor kingdom of Zimri-Lim of Mari (r. 1775-1761 BCE).

== Reign ==
After Hammurabi of Babylon had destroyed the city of Mari, the Kingdom of Hana was established with its capital at Terqa. It would in large control the territory formerly held by Zimri-Lim of Mari. During this time, Terqa's eastern border seem to include Tabatum in the northeast and warring with Babylon for the control of Harradum on the Euphrates in the southeast.

In the Old Babylonian period, Isi-Sumuabi was the second king of Terqa. He is known from a number of clay tablets from the city of Ṭābatum.

Tabatum was on the middle reaches of the H̬abur, which belonged to his kingdom. Two of these are letters to Yasīm-Mahar, who was his local governor. There are two other tablets in which he is mentioned. They are of a legal-administrative nature. One of them deals with the monthly rotation in connection with the pudûm ceremony for the sun god Šamaš . His name appears in the year name with which the tablet is dated: the "year that Iṣī-Sumuabi ... dedicated to Šamaš". This immediately makes his royal dignity crystal clear and the fact that in Ṭābatum the calendar was based on his regnal years. The other tablet concerns the grant of a piece of land in which he is called "king". The tablet also clearly shows that it was written in the legal tradition of H̬ana. The punishment for breaking the contract is to be smeared with hot asphalt . It dates from a different year, the year name of which refers to a project in which work was being done on the course of the river. The king is also mentioned elsewhere, for example in a contract found in Terqa which was further downstream on the Euphrates. There is also a contract from Haradum, another 90 km further downstream in which he is mentioned. With this he ruled over an area not much inferior to the land of Zimri-Lim of Mari . [ 1 ]

Iṣī-Sumuabi was the successor of Yapah-Sumu[abu?]. In his time, and that of Samsu-iluna, H̬ana must have regained his independence from Babylonia, but nothing else is known about him. Iṣī-Sumuabi was succeeded by Yadih-abu. They must have reigned as independent kings for about 20–30 years, but the precise chronology is not clear.

A possible attestation is a year-name of Isi-Sumu-Abum (BM 80338).
