= Abarakkum =

Abarakkum is translated in Akkadian as "steward, house-keeper or administrator" of a temple, palace, or private household. The term was a loan word from the Sumerian lexicon. Sumerian literature described this position as an official entrusted with state secrets (ad-hal). In documents from the royal archives of Mari, Syria, the title designated the male administrator of the palace kitchens.

The position was cited in several administrative documents under the reign of Zimri-Lim, who maintained an extensive correspondence with his governors. The Mari archives recorded a noted abarakkum identified as Asqudum, who served during the first three years of Lim's reign. He was an important figure not only in the government's administration but also in other areas, having been sent to diplomatic, military, and administrative missions. Another historical figure who occupied this position was Bulatatum. He was tasked with the distribution of agrarian tools during the reign of the Babylonian king Ammi-saduqa. A letter written by a major Saggarâtum official called Iskur-Saga also identified an abarakkum called Yawi-la in an account of his administrative duties.

Other sources identified a palace position in Mari called abarakkatum, which was occupied by women doing auxiliary tasks, and abarakku, a position who received garments or was associated with food services.
