= Amorites =

Ancient Semitic-speaking people from the Levant

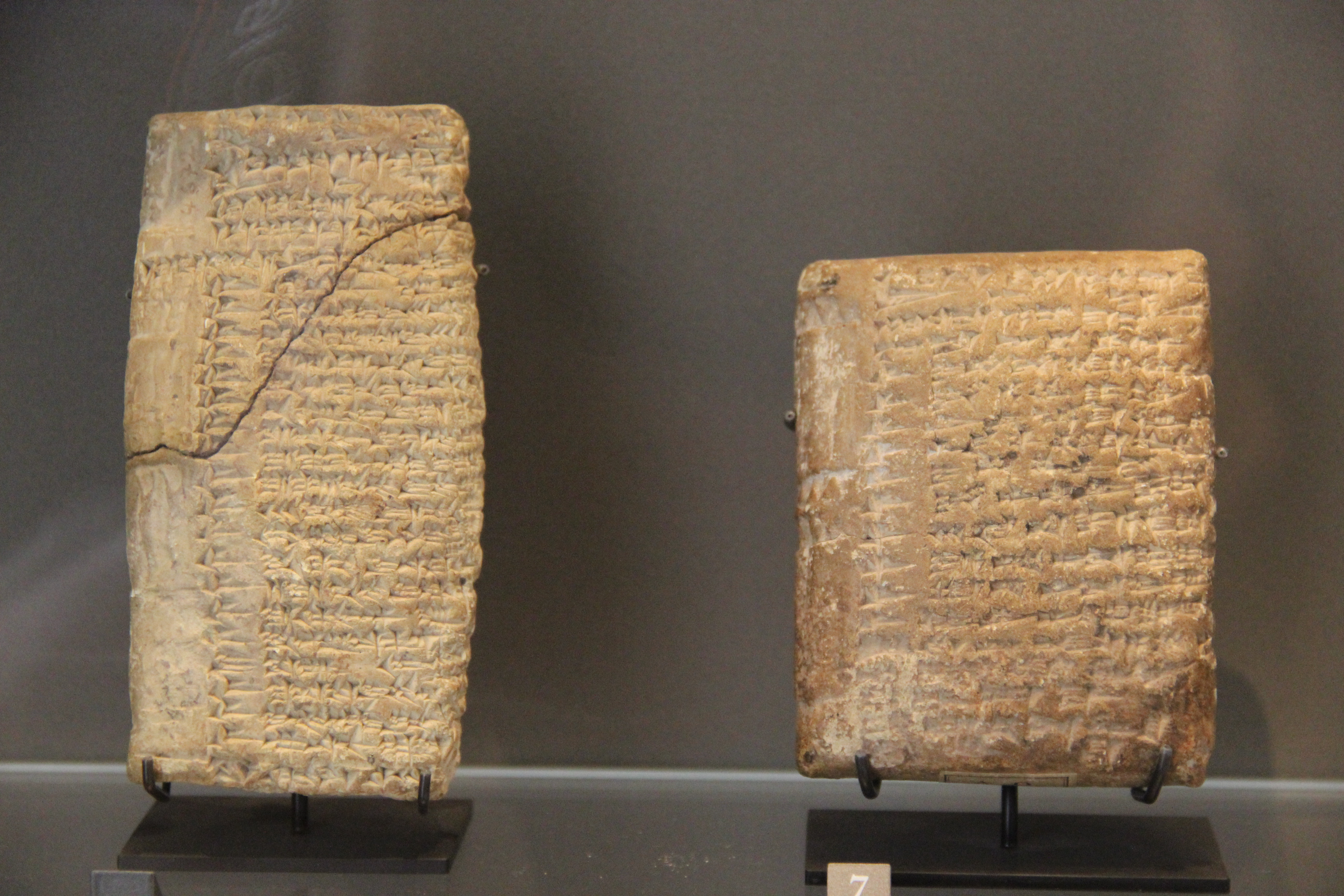
Cuneiform clay tablets from the Amorite Kingdom of Mari, 1st half of the 2nd millennium BC

The Amorites (/ˈæməˌraɪts/) (Note: Sumerian: 𒈥𒌅, romanized: MAR.TU; Akkadian: 𒀀𒈬𒊒𒌝, romanized: Amurrūm or Akkadian: 𒋾𒀉𒉡𒌝/𒊎, romanized: Tidnum; Hebrew: אֱמֹרִי, romanized: ʾĔmōrī; Koine Greek: Ἀμορραῖοι) were an ancient Northwest Semitic-speaking Bronze Age people who originated in Western Mesopotamia. Initially appearing in Sumerian records c. 2500 BC, they expanded and ruled most of the Levant and Mesopotamia, and parts of Egypt, from the 21st century BC to the start of the 16th century BC.

The Amorites established several prominent city-states in various locations, such as Isin, Kurda, Larsa, Mari, and Ebla, and later founded Babylon and the Old Babylonian Empire. They also founded the Fourteenth Dynasty of Egypt during the fragmented era of the Second Intermediate Period in the Nile Delta, which was characterized by rulers bearing Amorite names such as Yakbim Sekhaenre, and were likely part of the later Hyksos.

The term Amurru, in Akkadian and Sumerian texts, refers to the Amorites, their principal deity, and the Amorite kingdom. The Amorites are mentioned in the Hebrew Bible as inhabitants of Canaan, both before and after the conquest of the land under Joshua.

== History ==
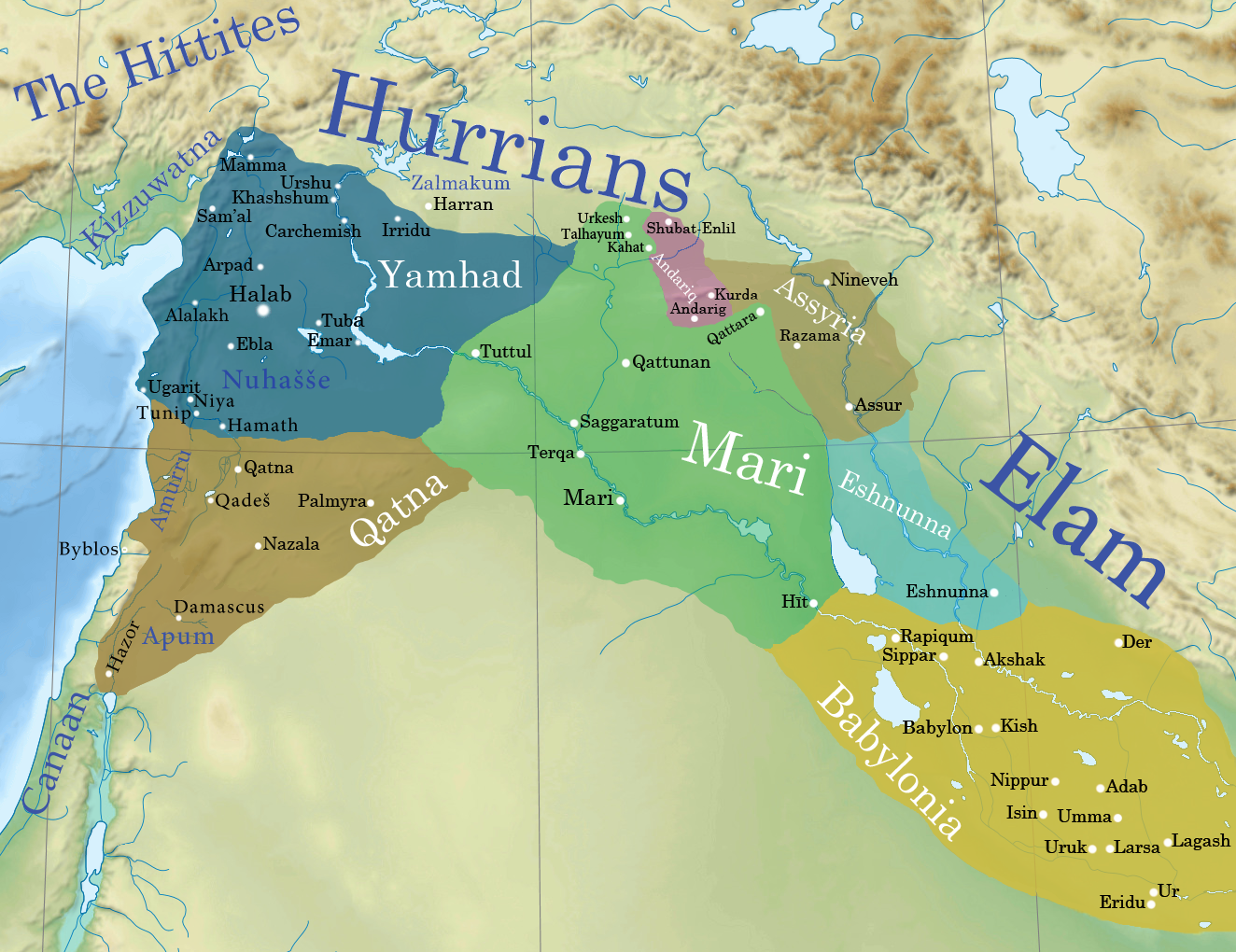
Various Amorite states (Yamhad, Qatna, Mari, Andarig, Babylon and Eshnunna) and Assyria c. 1764 BC

=== Third millennium BC ===
It is thought that terms like mar.tu were used to represent who we now call the Amorites:

In two Sumerian literary compositions written long afterward in the Old Babylonian period, Enmerkar and the Lord of Aratta and Lugalbanda and the Anzu Bird, the Early Dynastic ruler of Uruk Enmerkar (listed in the Sumerian King List) mentions "the land of the mar.tu". It is not known to what extent these reflect historical facts.

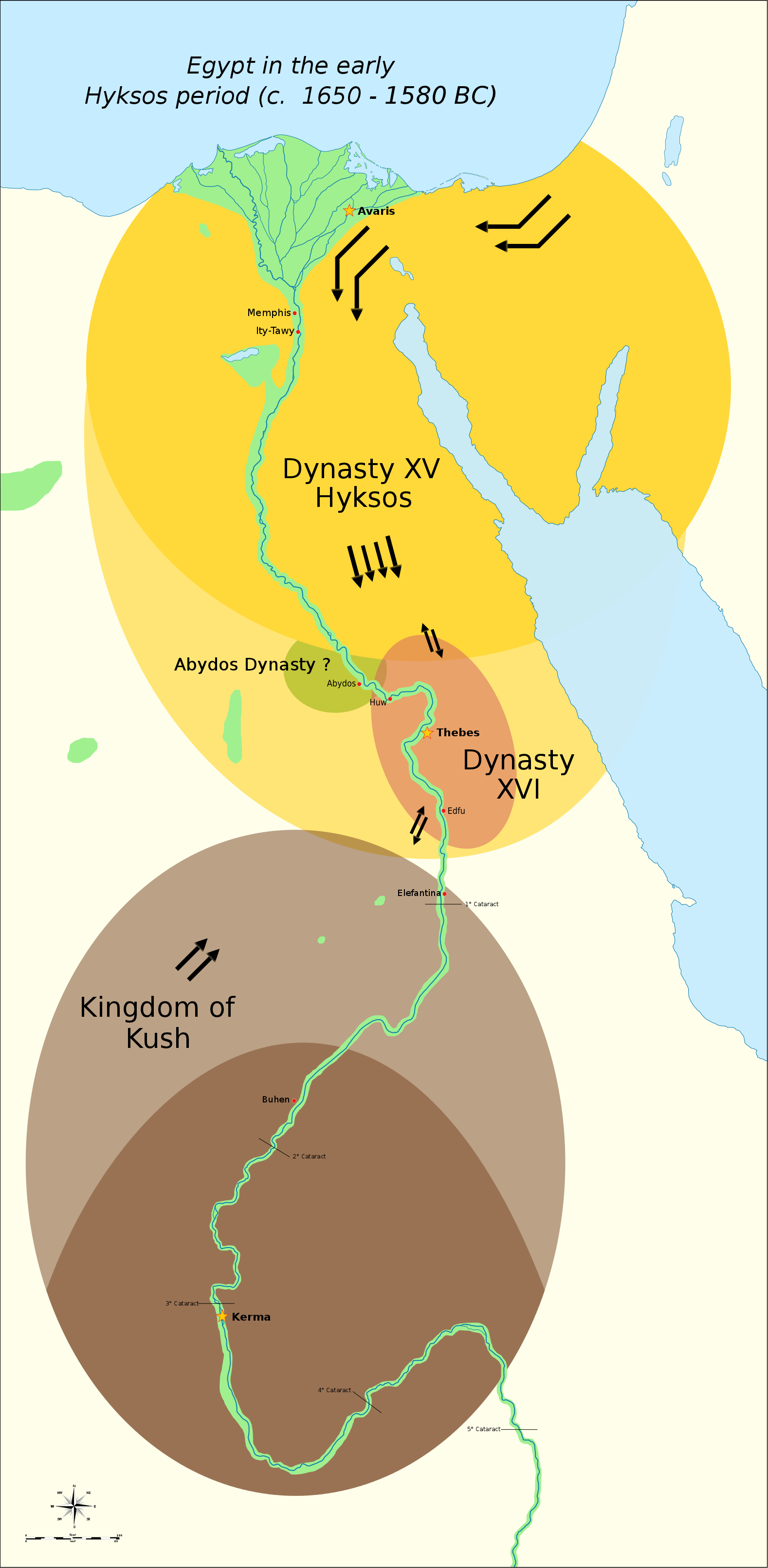
Fifteenth dynasty of Egypt of the Hyksos, of whom the Amorites were part

There are also sparse mentions about Amorites (often as MAR-DU^{ki}) in tablets from the East Semitic-speaking kingdom of Ebla, dating from 2500 BC to the destruction of the city in c. 2250 BC. From the perspective of the Eblaites, the Amorites were a rural group living in the narrow basin of the middle and upper Euphrates in northern Syria. The Eblaites used the term MAR.TU in an early time for a state and people east to Ebla (around Emar and Tuttul), which means the name Amurru for the west is later than the name for the state or the people.

For the Akkadian emperors of central Mesopotamia, mar.tu was one of the "Four Quarters" surrounding Akkad, along with Subartu (north), Sumer (south), and Elam (east). Naram-Sin of Akkad records in a royal inscription defeating a coalition of Sumerian cities and Amorites near Jebel Bishri in northern Syria c. 2240 BC. His successor, Shar-Kali-Sharri, recorded in one of his year names "In the year in which Szarkaliszarri was victorious over Amurru in the [Jebel Bishri]".

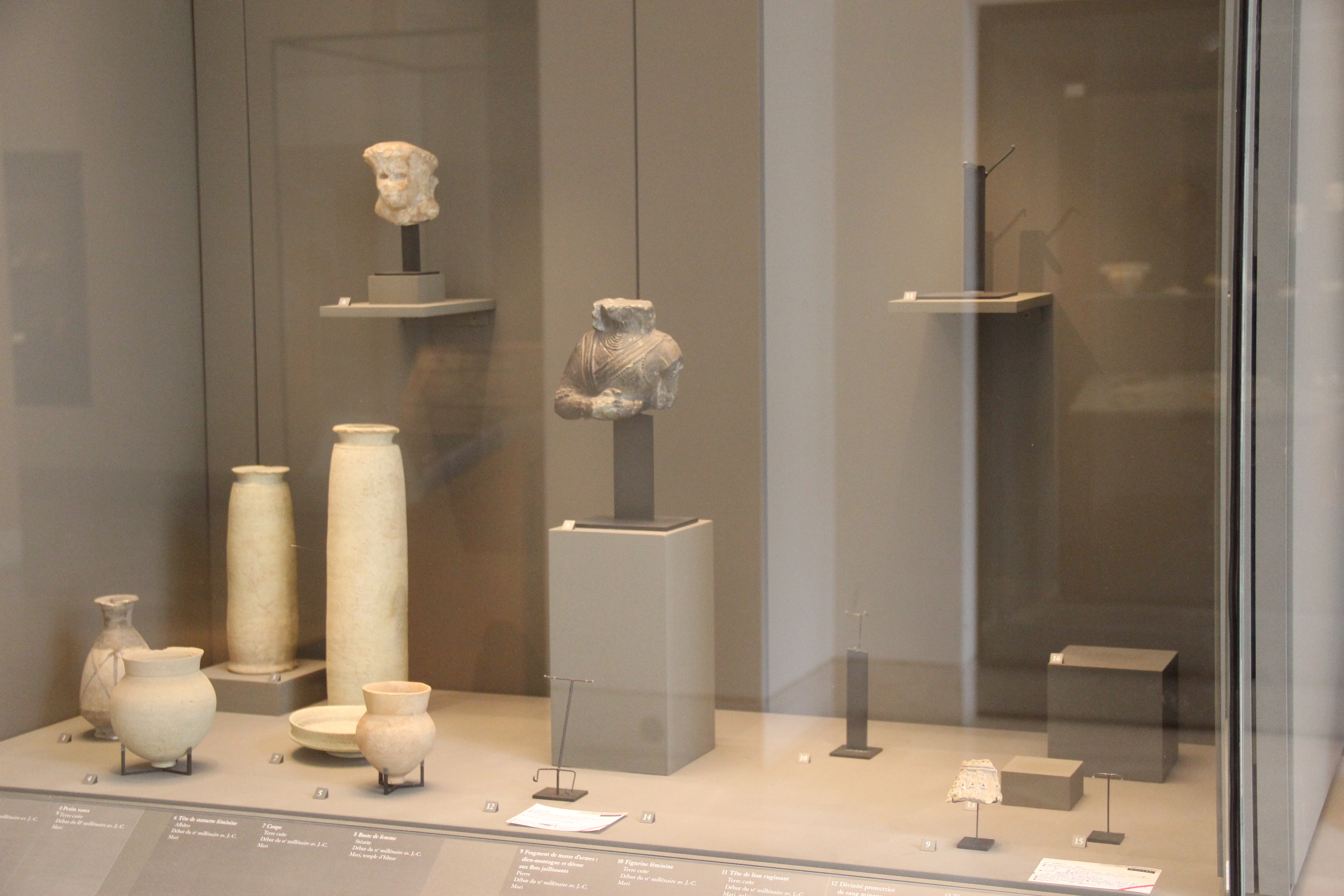
Artifacts from Amorite Kingdom of Mari, first half of 2nd millennium BC

By the time of the last days of the Third Dynasty of Ur, the immigrating Amorites had become such a force that kings such as Shu-Sin were obliged to construct a 270-kilometre (170 mi) wall from the Tigris to the Euphrates to hold them off. The Amorites are depicted in contemporary records as nomadic tribes under chiefs, who forced themselves into lands they needed to graze their herds. Some of the Akkadian literature of this era speaks disparagingly of the Amorites and implies that the Akkadian- and Sumerian-speakers of Mesopotamia viewed their nomadic and primitive way of life with disgust and contempt. In the Sumerian myth "Marriage of Martu", written early in the 2nd millennium BC, a goddess considering marriage to the god of the Amorites is warned:

Now listen, their hands are destructive and their features are those of monkeys; (An Amorite) is one who eats what (the Moon-god) Nanna forbids and does not show reverence. They never stop roaming about ..., they are an abomination to the gods' dwellings. Their ideas are confused; they cause only disturbance. (The Amorite) is clothed in sack-leather ... , lives in a tent, exposed to wind and rain, and cannot properly recite prayers. He lives in the mountains and ignores the places of gods, digs up truffles in the foothills, does not know how to bend the knee (in prayer), and eats raw flesh. He has no house during his life, and when he dies he will not be carried to a burial-place. My girlfriend, why would you marry Martu?

As the centralized structure of the Third Dynasty of Ur slowly collapsed, the city-states of the south such as Isin, Larsa and Eshnunna, began to reassert their former independence, and the areas in southern Mesopotamia with Amorites were no exception. Elsewhere, the armies of Elam were attacking and weakening the empire, making it vulnerable. Ur was eventually occupied by the Elamites. They remained until they were ejected by the Isin ruler Ishbi-Erra, which marked the beginning of the Isin-Larsa period.

=== 2nd millennium BC ===
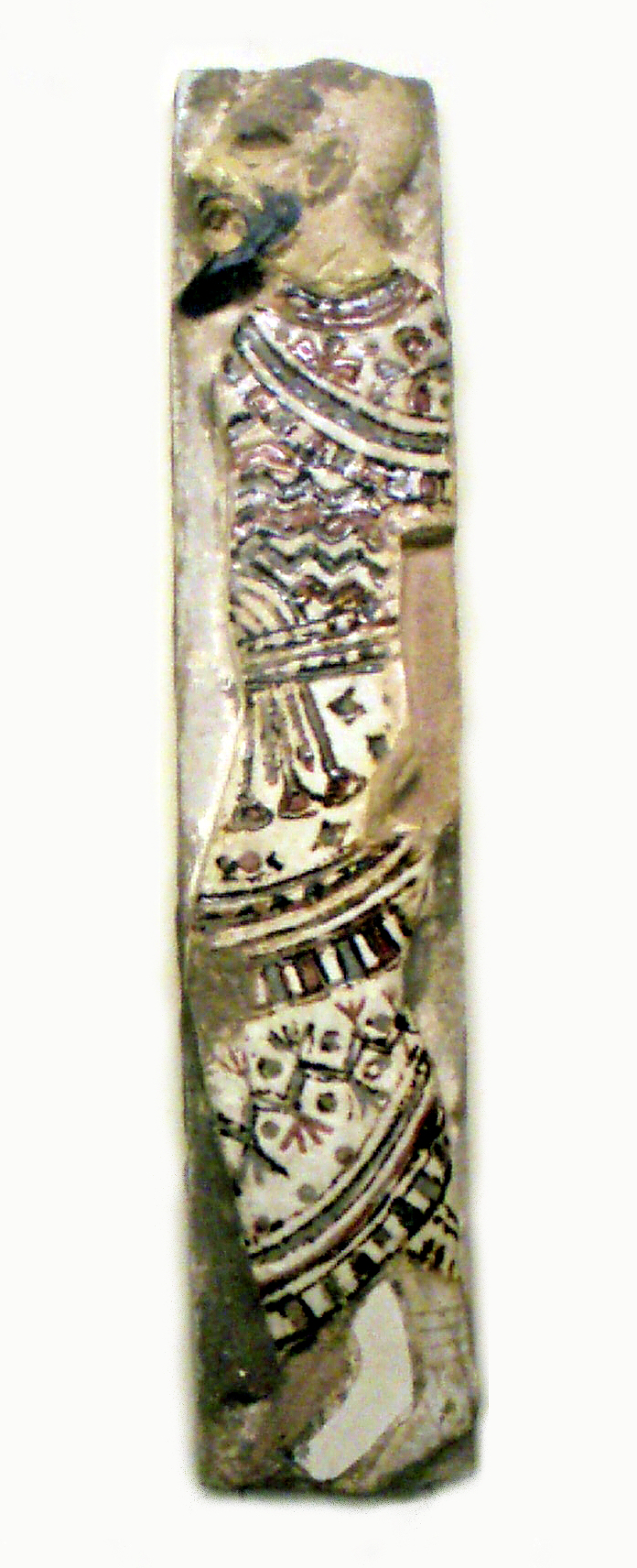
One of the Ramesses III prisoner tiles, which is speculated by some scholars to represent an Amorite man

After the decline of Ur III, Amorite rulers gained power in a number of Mesopotamian city-states beginning in the Isin-Larsa period and peaking in the Old Babylonian period. In the north, the Amorite ruler of Ekallatum, Shamshi-Adad I conquered Assur and formed the large, though short-lived Kingdom of Upper Mesopotamia. In the south, Babylon became the major power under the Amorite ruler Sumu-la-El and his successors, including the notable Hammurabi. Higher up the Euphrates, to the northwest, the Amorite kingdom of Mari arose, later to be destroyed by Hammurabi. Babylon itself would later be sacked by the Hittites, with its empire assumed by the Kassites. West of Mari, Yamhad ruled from its capital Halab, today's Aleppo, until it was destroyed by the Hittites in 16th century BC. The city of Ebla, under the control of Yamhad in this period, also had Amorite rulership.

There is thought to have been an Amorite presence in Egypt from the 19th century BC. The Fourteenth Dynasty of Egypt, centred in the Nile Delta, had rulers bearing Amorite names such as Yakbim. Furthermore, increasing evidence suggests that the succeeding Hyksos of Egypt were an amalgam of peoples from Syria of which the Amorites were also part. Based on temple architecture, Manfred Bietak argues for strong parallels between the religious practices of the Hyksos at Avaris with those of the area around Byblos, Ugarit, Alalakh and Tell Brak and defines the "spiritual home" of the Hyksos as "in northernmost Syria and northern Mesopotamia", areas typically associated with Amorites at the time.

In 1650 BC, the Hyksos established the Fifteenth Dynasty of Egypt and ruled most of Lower and Middle Egypt contemporaneously with the Sixteenth and Seventeenth dynasties of Thebes during the chaotic Second Intermediate Period.

=== Fall ===
In the 16th century BC, the Amorite era ended in Mesopotamia with the decline and fall of Babylon and other Amorite-ruled cities. The Kassites occupied Babylon and reconstituted it under the Kassite dynasty under the name of Karduniaš around 1595 BC. In far southern Mesopotamia, the native First Sealand dynasty had reigned over the Mesopotamian Marshes region until the Kassites brought the region under their control. In northern Mesopotamia, the power vacuum left by the Amorites brought the rise of the Mitanni (Ḫanigalbat) c. 1600 BC.

From the 15th century BC onward, the term Amurru is usually applied to the region extending north of Canaan as far as Kadesh on the Orontes River in northern Syria.

After the mid-2nd millennium BC, Syrian Amorites came under the domination of first the Hittites and, from the 14th century BC, the Middle Assyrian Empire. They then appear to have been displaced or absorbed by other semi-nomadic West Semitic-speaking peoples, known collectively as the Ahlamu during the Late Bronze Age collapse. The Arameans rose to be the prominent group amongst the Ahlamu. From c. 1200 BC onward, the Amorites disappeared from the pages of history, but the name reappeared in the Hebrew Bible.

== Language ==
The Amorite language was first attested in the 21st–20th centuries BC and was found to be closely related to the Canaanite, Aramaic and Sam'alian languages. In the 18th century BC at Mari Amorite scribes wrote in an Eshnunna dialect of the East Semitic Akkadian language. Since the texts contain Northwest Semitic forms, words and constructions, the Amorite language is thought to be a Northwest Semitic language. The main sources for the extremely limited extant knowledge of the Amorite language are the proper names and loanwords, not Akkadian in style, that are preserved in such texts. Amorite proper names were found throughout Mesopotamia in the Old Babylonian period, as well as places as far afield as Alalakh in Turkey and modern day Bahrain (Dilmun). They are also found in Egyptian records.

Ugaritic is also a Northwest Semitic language and is possibly an Amorite dialect.

== Religion ==
A bilingual list of the names of ten Amorite deities alongside Akkadian counterparts from the Old Babylonian period was translated in 2022. These deities are as follows:

- Dagan, who is identified with Enlil. Dagan was the supreme god in many cities in the Euphrates region of Upper Mesopotamia, especially at sites such as Mari, Tuttul, and Terqa. Babylonian texts refer to the chief god of the Amorites as Amurru (^{d}mar.tu, read as "ilu Amurru"), corresponding to their name for the ethnic group. They also identify his consort as the goddess Ašratum.
- Kamiš, an otherwise poorly attested deity largely known from Akkadian and Amorite theophoric names. He was significant at Ebla, where a month was named after him. The bilingual identifies him with the god Ea though other god lists identify him with Nergal.
- Ašratum, whose name is cognate with Asherah and is identified with Belet-ili.
- Yaraḫum, the moon god, who is named Yarikh at Ugarit. He is identified with the god Sīn.
- Rašapum, equated with Nergal and also known from Ebla.
- A god with an incompletely reconstructed name (possibly /ʔārum/) who is identified with Išum.
- Ḫalamu, identified with Šubula, a deity in the netherworld god's circle.
- Ḫanatum, who is here identified with Ištar.
- Pidray, previously known only from the Late Bronze Age Ugaritic texts and later. In the bilingual list she is identified with Nanaya.
- Aštiulḫālti, who is identified with Ištaran, the tutelary deity of the city of Der.

This list is not thought to represent a full Amorite pantheon, as it does not include important members such as the sun and weather deities.

== Biblical Amorites ==
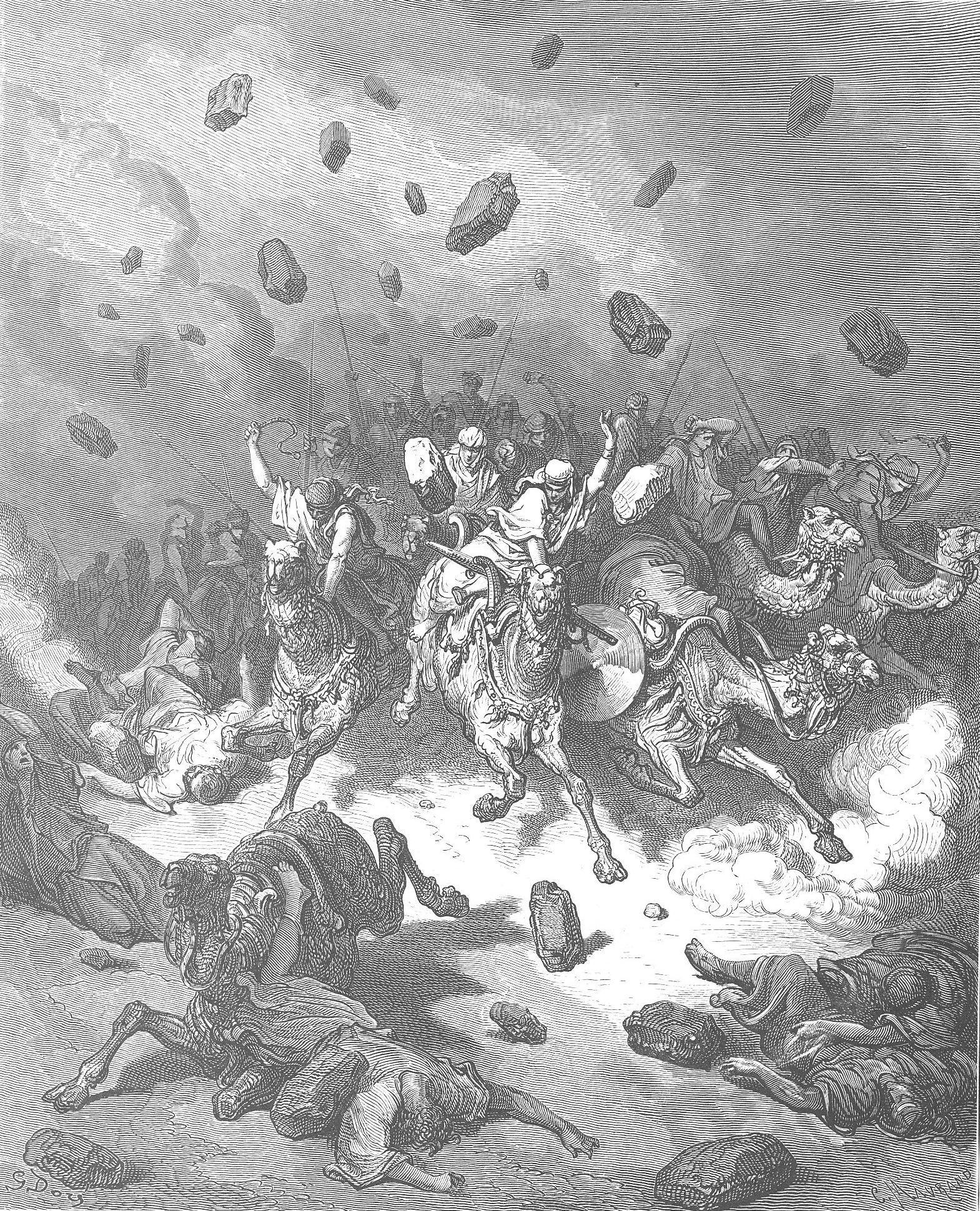
Destruction of the Army of the Amorites by Gustave Doré

The term Amorites is used in the Bible to refers to certain highlanders who inhabited the land of Canaan, described in Genesis as descendants of Canaan, the son of Ham (Gen. 10:16). This aligns with Akkadian and Babylonian traditions that equate the Levant with the "land of the Amorites". They are described as a powerful people of great stature "like the height of the cedars" (Amos 2:9) who had occupied the land east and west of the Jordan. The height and strength mentioned in Amos 2:9 has led some Christian scholars, including Orville J. Nave, who wrote the Nave's Topical Bible, to refer to the Amorites as "giants". In Deuteronomy, the Amorite king Og is described as the last "of the remnant of the Rephaim" (Deut 3:11). The terms Amorite and Canaanite seem to be used more or less interchangeably, but sometimes Amorite refers to a specific tribe living in Canaan.

The Biblical Amorites seem to have originally occupied the region stretching from the heights west of the Dead Sea (Gen. 14:7) to Hebron (Gen. 13:8; Deut. 3:8; 4:46–48), embracing "all Gilead and all Bashan" (Deut. 3:10), with the Jordan Valley on the east of the river (Deut. 4:49), the land of the "two kings of the Amorites", Sihon and Og (Deut. 31:4 and Joshua 2:10; 9:10). Sihon and Og were independent kings whose people were displaced from their land in battle with the Israelites (Numbers 21:21–35)—though in the case of the war led by Og/Bashan it appears none of them survived, and the land became part of Israel (Numbers 21:35). The Amorites seem to have been linked to the Jerusalem region, and the Jebusites may have been a subgroup of them (Ezek. 16:3). The southern slopes of the mountains of Judea are called the "mount of the Amorites" (Deut. 1:7, 19, 20).

The Book of Joshua states the five kings of the Amorites were first defeated with great slaughter by Joshua (Josh. 10:5). Then, more Amorite kings were defeated at the waters of Merom by Joshua (Josh. 11:8). It is mentioned that in the days of Samuel, there was peace between them and the Israelites (1 Sam. 7:14). The Gibeonites were said to be their descendants, being an offshoot of the Amorites who made a covenant with the Hebrews (2 Samuel 21:2). When Saul later broke that vow and killed some of the Gibeonites, God is said to have sent a famine to Israel (2 Samuel 21:1).

In 2017, Philippe Bohstrom of Haaretz observed similarities between the Amorites and modern-day Jews, since both may have originated from a single spot, spread around their regions and managed to stay distantly connected kinshipwise. He believes possibly either that Abraham was among the Amorites who migrated to the Land of Israel, around the same time of the destruction of the Sumerian capital Ur by Elamites in 1750 BCE, or suggests continuity between "the bible’s [sic] portrait of Israel’s tribal organization and mobile herding background" and that of the Amorites. Nonetheless, the Biblical writers only applied the Amorite ethnonym to Canaanite nations existing pre-Israelite conquest. According to biblical scholar Daniel E. Fleming, reasons for these biblical appearances include a polemical desire to use the stereotypes present in the Sumerian myth Marriage of Martu and explaining the acquisition of current territory, caveating both that the lack of evidence of biblical writers having access to contemporaneous texts describing the historical past of the Amorites may result in only an historical interest from their use of the ethnonym.

== Origin ==
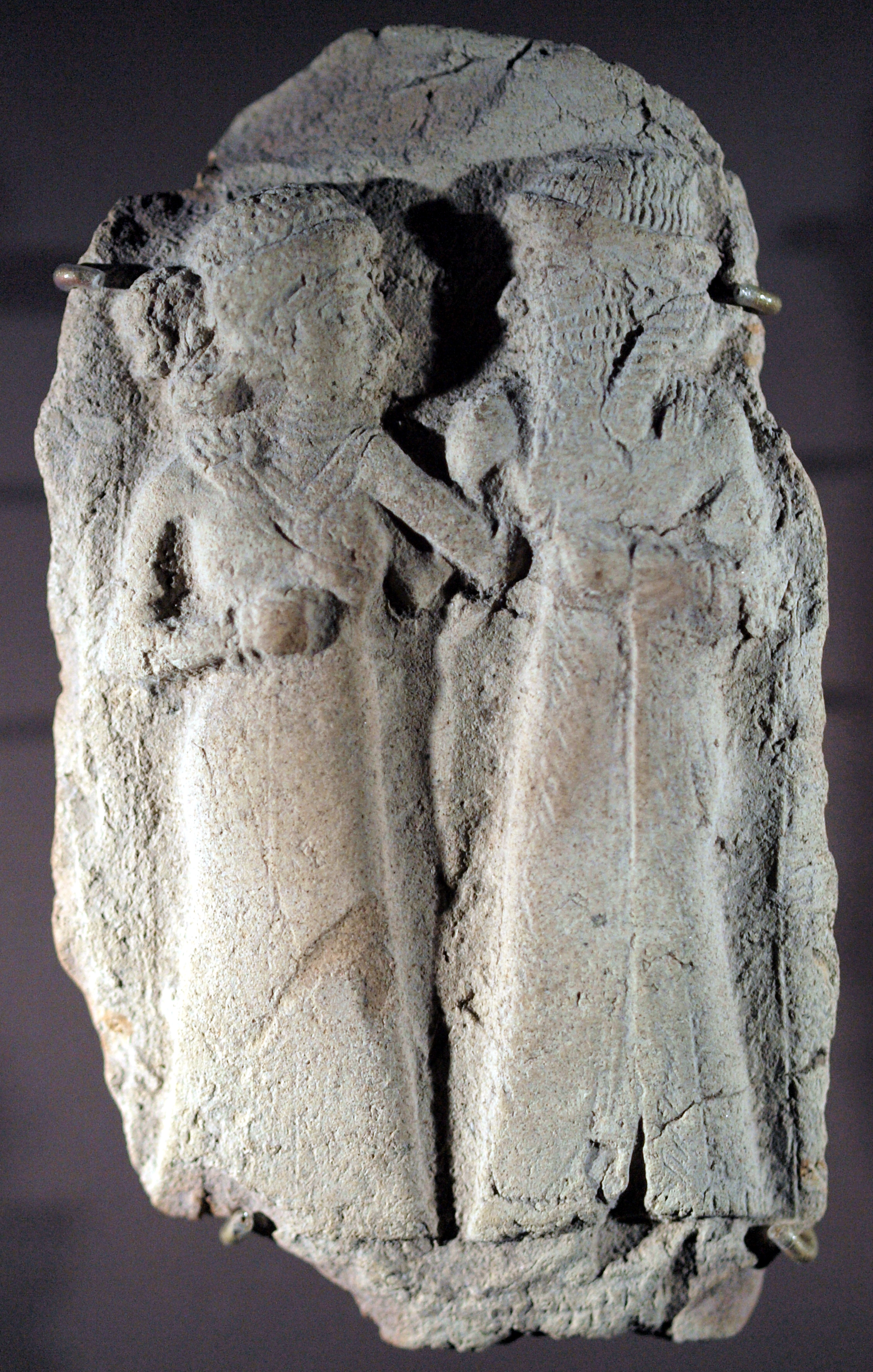
Terracotta of a couple, probably Inanna and Dumuzi, Girsu, Amorite period, 2000–1600 BC. Louvre Museum AO 16676.

There are a wide range of views regarding the Amorite homeland. One extreme is the view that kur mar.tu/māt amurrim covered the whole area between the Euphrates and the Mediterranean Sea, the Arabian Peninsula included. The most common view is that the "homeland" of the Amorites was a limited area in Western Mesopotamia, in what is now central Syria, identified with the mountainous region of Jebel Bishri or the Syrian steppe. The Amorites are regarded as one of the ancient Semitic-speaking peoples. According to ''Encyclopaedia Britannica'', the Amorites were linked with western regions in early cuneiform records, but their homeland was more likely Arabia than Syria.

== Genetics ==
Ancient DNA analysis on 28 human remains dating to the Middle and Late Bronze Age from ancient Alalakh, an Amorite city with a Hurrian minority, found that the inhabitants of Alalakh were a mixture of Copper age Levantines and Mesopotamians, and were genetically similar to contemporaneous Levantines. Paternal Y-DNA haplogroups among twelve male specimen were distributed as follows: J1a2a1a2-P58 (6), J2a1a1a2b2a-Z1847 (2), while the remaining four carried haplogroups J2b2-Z2454, H2-P96, L2-L595 and T1a1-CTS11451 each. Seven more male specimen were analyzed by Ingman et al. (2021): three carried haplogroup J2a1a1a2, while the remaining four carried J1a2a1a, T1a1a, E1b1b-V12 and L1b-M349 each.

== Obsolete racial theories ==
The view that Amorites were fierce and tall nomads led to an anachronistic theory among some racialist writers in the 19th century that they were a tribe of "Aryan" warriors, who at one point dominated the Israelites. This belief, which originated with Felix von Luschan, fit models of Indo-European migrations posited during his time, but Luschan later abandoned that theory. Houston Stewart Chamberlain claims that King David and Jesus were both Aryans of Amorite extraction. The argument was repeated by the Nazi ideologue Alfred Rosenberg. Archibald Sayce, a British Assyriologist and linguist, wrote on the appearance of the Amorites in comparison to the Hittites: "The Amorites, on the contrary, were a tall and handsome people. They are depicted with white skins, blue eyes, and reddish hair, all the characteristics, in fact, of the white race." According to Sayce, this depiction originates from the work of ancient Egyptian artists. The Egyptologist Dr. Max Burchardt regarded the blond-hair and blue-eyed depiction as a fantasy or fairy tale, which can be traced back to the inexact observations and errors of previous scientific illustrators.

== Amorite states ==
In the Levant:

- Amurru kingdom
- Ebla's Third Dynasty
- Emar
- Mukish
- Shaddai
- Qatna
- Ugarit
- Yamhad
- Zahiran

In Mesopotamia:

- Andarig
- Apum
- First Babylonian Dynasty
- Ekallatum
- Mari's Lim Dynasty
- Ṭābetu
- Kingdom of Upper Mesopotamia

In Egypt:

- Fourteenth Dynasty of Egypt
- Fifteenth Dynasty of Egypt?
