= Tell Taban =

Archaeological site in Syria

- Ṭābetu
- Location within Syria Location within Near East
- 36°20′10″N 40°47′16″E
- Type: settlement
- Location: Al-Hasakah Governorate, Syria
- Region: Upper Mesopotamia

Site notes
- Excavation dates: 1997-1999, 2005-2010
- Archaeologists: Katsuhiko Ohnuma, Hirotoshi Numoto

Tell Taban is an archaeological site in north-eastern Syria in the Al-Hasakah Governorate, near the Habur river. It is the site of the ancient city of Ṭābatum/Ṭābetu (rarely Ṭabēte).

== Archaeology ==
Map of the Khabur Basin during the Bronze Age showing the location of Tell Taban (at the bottom) in relation to other important sites

The site was first excavated by a Kokushikan University Archaeological Mission team led by Hirotoshi Numoto from 1997 until 1999 as a salvage operation in response to the effects of the Hassake dam. A number of inscribed objects, mostly building inscriptions, were found. The site was again excavated in 2005 through 2010. More inscriptions and an archive containing over 100 cuneiform tablets were found, dating to the Old Babylonian and Middle Assyrian Periods.

== History ==
=== Middle Bronze Age ===
The city was mentioned in 18th century BC as a regional center named Ṭābatum in the tablets of the kingdom of Mari, and was destroyed by Samsu-Iluna of Babylon. In a text from the time of ruler Zimri-Lim found at Mari an official was sent to Ṭābatum which was being incorporated into the province of Qattunan. He traveled through Saggarâtum and on arriving found that the city had been completely evacuated before some unstated menace. Although it was about 200 kilometers away from Mari it is known the Zimri-Lim maintained a large estate at Ṭābatum. Afterward the city come under the control of the Kingdom of Ḫana centered on Terqa for a time.

=== Late Bronze Age ===
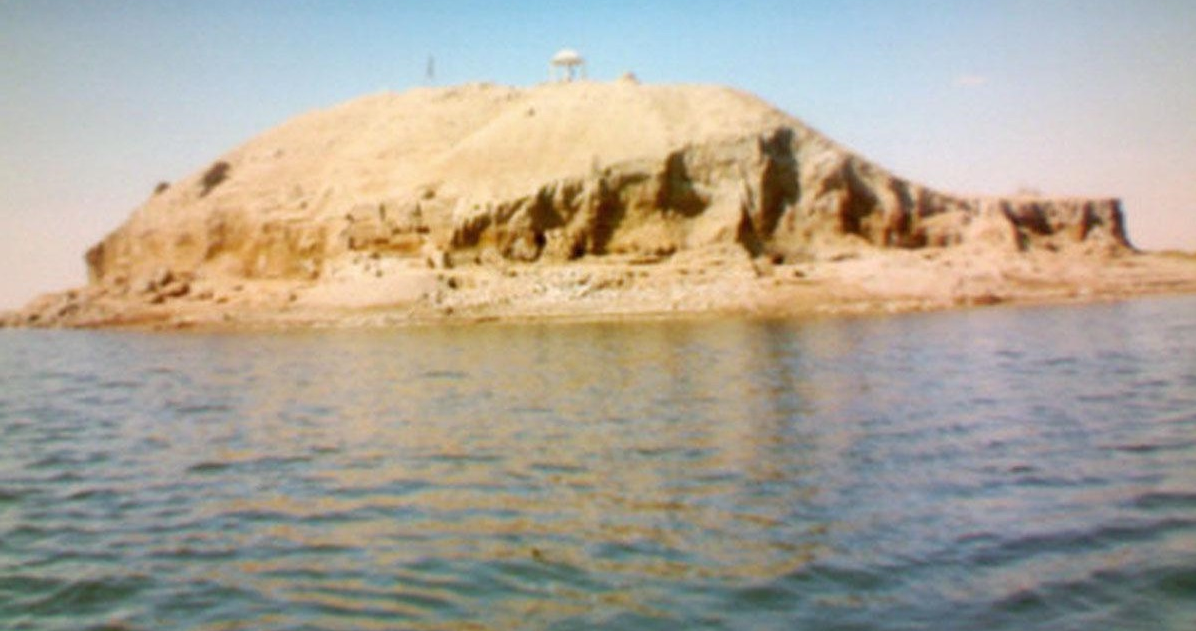
Tell Taban

A few centuries later, Ḫana was part of the Mitanni Empire. The Fall of Mitanni to Suppiluliuma I in 1345 BC, saw this area come under the Assyrians.

Ṭābetu had an autonomous dynasty ruled the city between the mid 14th and early 12th centuries BC as vassals of the Middle Assyrian kings; the rulers of Ṭābetu styled themselves "the kings of Ṭābetu and the Land of Mari". In this period, two places went by the name "Land of Mari", one in the area around Mãri (Tell Hariri) in the Middle Euphrates region and the other in the area around Tell Taban in the Middle Habur region.

By the time of middle-Assyrian period kingdom of Ṭābetu, the designation "Mari" was likely used to indicate the lands around Ṭābetu and did not refer to the ancient kingdom of Mari located on the Euphrates. Another possibility is that Mari from the Ṭābetu king's title correspond to "Marê"; a city mentioned c. 803 BC in the stele of Nergal-ereš, a Limmu of the neo-Assyrian king Adad-nirari III. Marê was mentioned in association with Raṣappu which was likely located in the southern and eastern slopes of the Sinjar Mountains.

It is thought that in this period there was a shrine of the goddess Gula at the site.

It has been proposed that there was a temple of Sebettu at the site in this period. During the reign of local ruler Aššur-Ketta-Lešir I a letter found at Tell Taban addressed to one Labeʾtu reads "Let me deliver 1 sūtu of fine oil, which my lady requested. It will enter the temple of the Sebettu, who protects you".

== King List ==
The origin of the dynasty is vague; the first known two rulers bore Hurrian names. However, "the land of Mari" is mentioned in the Hurrian Mitannian archive of Nuzi, and tablets dating to the 15th and 14th centuries BC from Tell Taban itself reveal that the inhabitants were Amorites. The dynasty could have been Amorite in origin but adopted Hurrian royal names to appease the Mitannian empire. The kings of Ṭābetu seems to have acknowledged the authority of Assyria as soon as the Assyrian conquest of Mitanni began; in return, the Assyrians approved the continuation of the local dynasty whose rulers were quickly Assyrianised and adopted Assyrian names replacing the Hurrian names. This is a list of the kings of Ṭābetu who belonged to the same dynasty.

Ruler	period	Notes
Akit-Teššup	Late 14th–early 13th century
Zumiya	Early 13th century	Son of Akit-Teššup
Adad-Bel-Gabbe I	Early 13th century BC	Son of predecessor
One or two unknown rulers	Mid 13th century BC
Aššur-Ketta-Lešir I	Mid 13th–late 13th century BC	Descendant of Adad-Bel-Gabbe I
Adad-Bel-Gabbe II	Late 13th–early 12th century BC	Son of Aššur-Ketta-Lešir I
Rīš-Nergal	Mid 12th century BC	Son of Adad-Bel-Gabbe II
Mannu-lū-yāʾu	Mid 12th century BC	Son of Adad-Bel-Gabbe II
Name not identified	Mid 12th century BC	Son of Mannu-lū-yāʾu
Etel-pî-Adad	Mid 12th century BC	Son of Adad-Bel-Gabbe II
Adad-bēl-apli	Mid–late 12th century BC	Son of Etel-pî-Adad
Adad-Bel-Gabbe III	Late 12th century BC	Son of Adad-bēl-apli
Aššur-Ketta-Lešir II	Late 12th–early 11th century BC	Son of Adad-Bel-Gabbe III
Enlil-šar-ilāni	Early 11th century BC	Son of Aššur-Ketta-Lešir II
Adad-apla-iddina	Unclear

== See also ==
- Chronology of the ancient Near East
- Cities of the ancient Near East
- List of Mesopotamian dynasties
- List of Mesopotamian deities
