= Qaṭṭunān =

Ancient Mesopotamian city

Qaṭṭunān was a city and area in the ancient Near East which is still unlocated though it is known to have been on the Habur River, a tributary of the Euphrates in Syria. It was mostly given over to pasture with some agriculture near the city and parts of the lower valley, primarily in barley and sesame. In the Hana period of control it was named Qaṭṭunā and it has been suggested that in the Middle Assyria period it was called Qaṭni and in the Neo-Assyrian period Qaṭnu (also Qaṭinê). A Neo-Assyrian governor Nergal-ēreš c. 800 BC was in charge of "Dūr-Katlimmu, Kār-Aššūr-nāṣir-apli, Sirqu, the lands Laqê, Ḫindānu, the city Anat, the land Suḫu (and) the city (Ana)-Aššūr-(utēr)-aṣbat".

== History ==
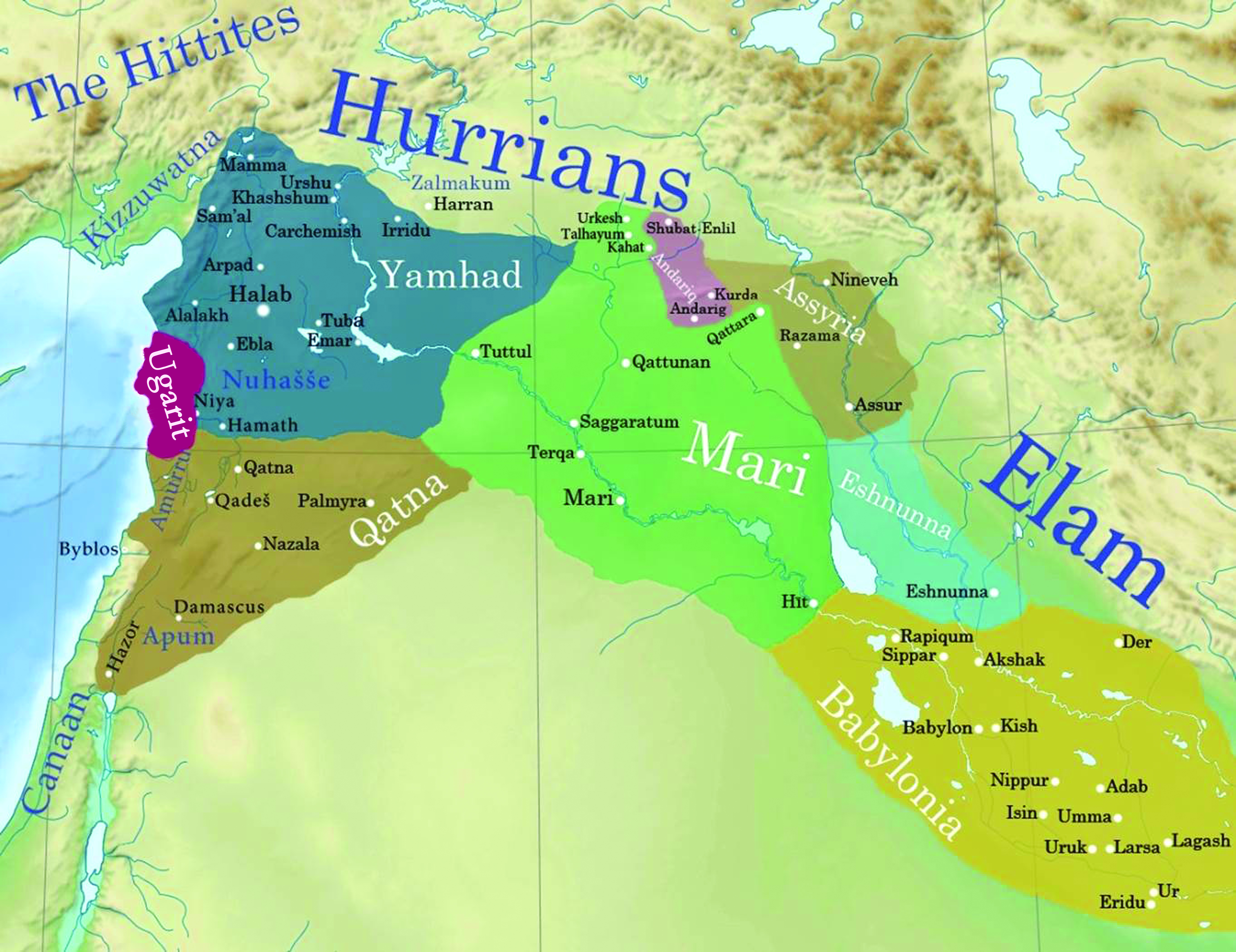
Map of Mari region - locations of Qaṭṭunān and Saggarâtum are approximate

Initially, the area of Mari, including Qaṭṭunān, came under the control of the Kingdom of Upper Mesopotamia ruled by Shamshi-Adad I of Ekallatum. Shamshi-Adad I assigned control of Mari to his second son Yasmah-Adad who placed Qaṭṭunān under a governor, Haqba-ahum. Little is known about the history or condition of Qaṭṭunān under Yasmah-Adad but the first representative of Zimri-Lim at the city reported that "I have to cope with a ruined palace".

After the collapse of the Kingdom of Upper Mesopotamia Mari, including Qaṭṭunān, came under the control of the Lim dynasty of Suprum beginning with Yaggid-Lim. The Old Babylonian period kingdom of Mari was made up of several parts, the central district of Mari, Terqa and Saggarâtum, Qaṭṭunān, and possibly Tuttul. Known towns in Qaṭṭunān during the Mari period were Magrisâ (possibly Tell Tnenir), Jâbatum, Zilhân, Tehrân, Dûr-sâbim, Latihum, Bît-Kapân (possibly Tell Fiden), and Râhatum (possibly Tell Abu Ha'it) all like Qaṭṭunān on the left bank of the Habur and were connected by a road. It is thought that Tâbatum (Tell Taban) was part of the province in the north. On taking power, Zimri-Lim launched a program to expand agriculture at Qaṭṭunān. There were 100 acres under cultivation in Zimri-Lim 1 but by Zimri-Lim 10 that had expanded to 1000 acres. As the population in Qaṭṭunān was largely nomadic with a relatively small sedentary population after the first few years reserve troops were sent in to help with the harvest. In Zimri-Lim years 4 and 8 there was no harvest due to an invasion of locusts. Troops from Hana were part of the Mari military and are reported in a text as being deployed from Tâbatum to Qaṭṭunān.

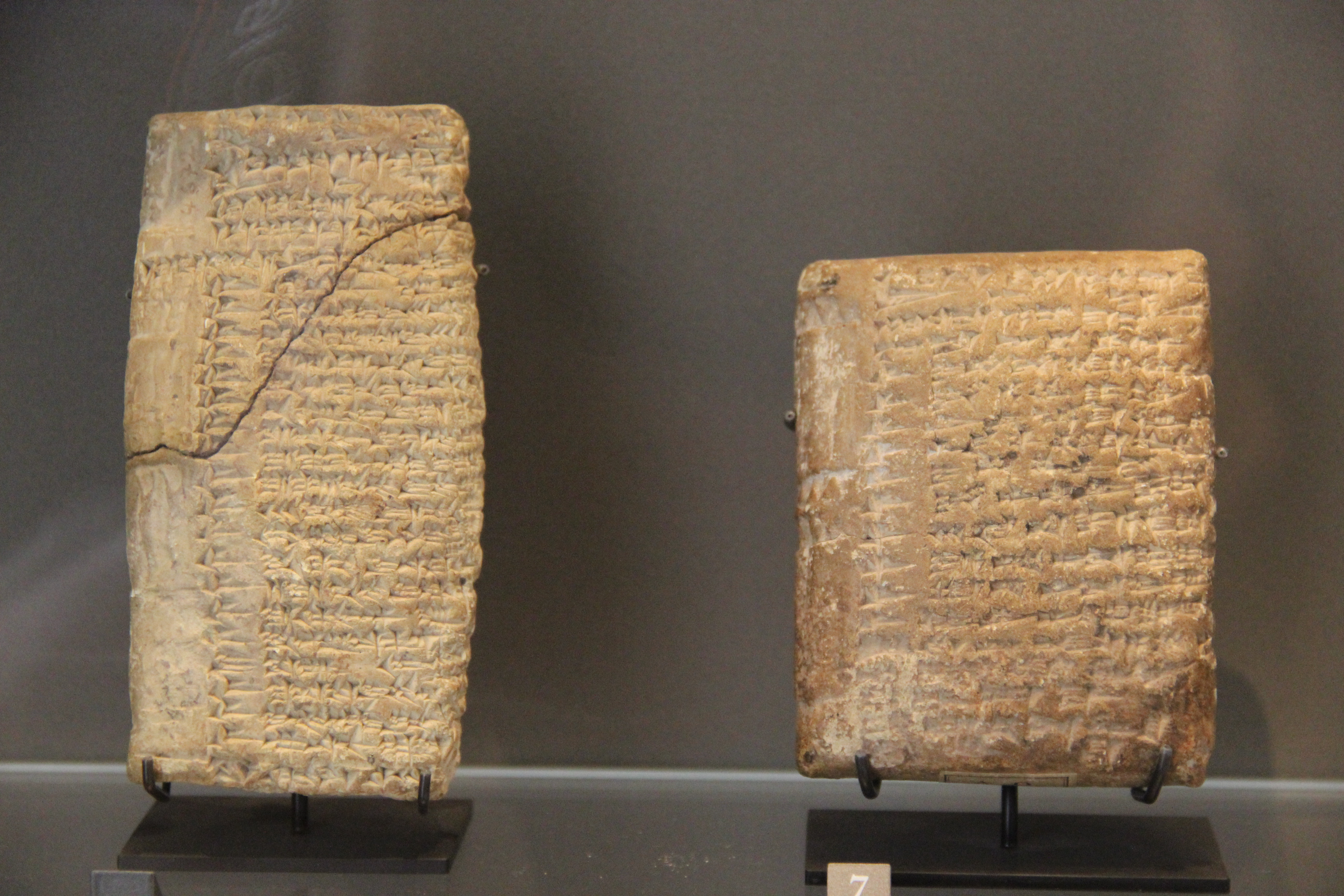
Cuneiform Tablets from Kingdom of Mari, 1st Half of 2nd Millennium BC

A governor of Qaṭṭunān under Zimri-Lim is known, Zakira-Ḫammû. Other known governors were Akîn-urubam, Iddin-Annu, Akšak-magir, Ilušu-naṣir, and Zimri-Addu (Zikri-Addu). In one text Zakira-Ḫammû refuses to give up a beautiful servant woman to a representative of the ruler.

"On the release of a maidservant to the envoy of Haya-sumu (of Ilanṣura), my lord wrote me the following, “Agree on a substitute for this maidservant and release his wife.” I have really looked into all these matters. This maidservant is one of the palace’s servants. When my lord captured Hazzakkannum, this servant was being raised; she is now a textile worker. Realising how beautiful is this maidservant and (in contrast) how aged is the one they are holding as replacement, I have decided not to release this maidservant to Haya-sumu’s envoy.’ It is not only because she had been trained as a weaver that the governor of Qaṭṭunān refused to transfer this woman – since the education of all girls included spinning and weaving – but mainly because she was beautiful"

Zimri-Lim was known to make unannounced visits to his various palaces. In one text Zimri-Addu complains "I have heard from my own sources about my lord's travel to Qattnunâ. If my lord is coming here, a note from my lord should promptly reach me so that I can prepare in advance of my lord."

After a long and successful reign which included an alliance with Babylon the kingdom of Mari, minus Mari itself which had been destroyed, fell under the control of Babylon during its expansionist phase under Hammurabi whose 33rd year name included "... overthrew in battle the army of Mari and Malgium and caused Mari and its territory and the various cities of Subartu to dwell under his authority in friendship ...".

After the fall of Babylon c. 1600 BC Qaṭṭunān along with Saggarâtum, became part of the Kingdom of Ḫana, with Terqa usually considered to be its capitol. This continued until c. 1400 BC when Hana became a vassal of the Mitanni Empire. At that point the capital of Hana became Qaṭṭunān. After that there are no records of Qaṭṭunān though it has been suggested that it existed under other names.

== Location ==
Saggarâtum is known to have been on the Habur River, a tributary of the Euphrates river south of Tell Taban and north of the unlocated city of Saggarâtum. The site of Tall Fadġamī (Tell Fagdami), 50 kilometers south of Tell Taban, has been suggested for Qaṭṭunān as has the 10 hectare site of Tell Ašamsâni which is about 5 kilometers from Tall Fadġamī.

Shamshi-Adad I of Ekallatum wrote to Yasmah-Adad about a planned visit to Mari from his capitol in Shubat-Enlil saying

"What you send to Shubat-Enlil in Saggaratum let them receive in boats. From Saggaratu[m] to Qattunan. From Qattunan in wagons let the Qattunaneans ta[ke] it. Let them carry it to Shubat-Enlil."

It is known that Qaṭṭunān was upstream of Saggarātum on the Habur river. On its southern border the unlocated town of Bīt-Kapān on the Habur a days march north of Saggarātum acted as a way station between the two provinces and appeared to be under joint control of the two governors. In a text the governor of Saggarātum complained, after a flood occurred:

"Already twice in the past, he [= the governor of Qaṭṭunān] has not announced the (flood of the) Ḫābūr! Now, here [= in Saggarātum], the rain did not fall: the place where the rain fell is far away. And the Ḫābūr […]"

== See also ==
- Chronology of the ancient Near East
- Cities of the Ancient Near East
- List of Mesopotamian dynasties
- List of Mesopotamian deities
