= El Shaddai =

One of the names of the god of Israel

El Shaddai (Hebrew: אֵל שַׁדַּי, romanized: ʾĒl Šadday; IPA: [el ʃadːaj]), or just Shaddai, is one of the names of God in Judaism. The Latin Vulgate rendered it as Deus Omnipotens, thus many English translations render it as God Almighty.

El means "God" in the Ugaritic and the Canaanite languages. However, the meaning of shaddai is the subject of much debate. Some scholars have argued that it is part from the Akkadian shadû (English: mountain), and Francesca Stavrakopoulou has suggested understanding the title as referring to unspecified fertility gods or wilderness gods. Others have suggested that the root (שָׁדַד) means 'ravager,' and various utterances amongst the Prophets seem to support this interpretation. One Jewish interpreter, Benjamin Blech, derives "a contraction of two words: שאמר די (She-amar Day), 'He who said enough, stop'."

The form of the phrase El Shaddai fits the pattern of the divine names in the Ancient Near East, exactly as is the case with names like ʾĒl ʿOlām, ʾĒl ʿElyon and ʾĒl Bēṯ-ʾĒl. As such, El Shaddai can convey several different semantic relations between the two words, including the deity of a place called Shaddai, a deity possessing the quality of shaddai, and a deity who is also known by the name Shaddai.

== Occurrences ==
The name Shaddai appears a total of 48 times in the Hebrew Bible and ranks third for frequency among divine titles.

It first appears in the Book of Genesis:

When Abram was ninety-nine years old, the Lᴏʀᴅ appeared to Abram and said to him, "I am [El Shaddai]; walk before me, and be blameless."

— Genesis 17:1 (NRSVue)

When Isaac blesses his son Jacob, his words invoke the blessing of "God Almighty" or El Shaddai, and later Jacob sees a vision of God at Bethel where he is told "I am El Shaddai. Be fruitful and multiply."

In the Book of Exodus, Yahweh says that he was known to the Patriarchs as El Shaddai but that his personal name was not known to them:

God also spoke to Moses and said to him, "I am [Yahweh]. I appeared to Abraham, Isaac, and Jacob as [El Shaddai], but by my name '[Yahweh]' I did not make myself known to them."

— Exodus 6:2-3 NRSVue

The vision of Balaam recorded in the Book of Numbers is stated to come from Shaddai.

... The oracle of Balaam son of Beor, the oracle of the man whose eye is clear, the oracle of the one who hears the words of [El], who sees the vision of [Shaddai], who falls down but with eyes uncovered ...

— Numbers 24:3-4 NRSVue

In the fragmentary inscriptions at Deir Alla, shaddayin, (Note: The word "שדין" appears in the ketiv of Job 19:29, where it is somewhat obscure ("גורו לכם מפני־חרב כי־חמה עונות חרב למען תדעון שדין"). Knauf suggests that this may mean "revenger gods" in his article on Shadday.) appear (Hebrew: שדין; the vowels are uncertain, as is the gemination of the d), perhaps lesser figurations of Shaddai. These have been tentatively identified with the šēdim "demons" (Hebrew: שדים) of Deuteronomy 32:17 (parashah Haazinu) and Psalm 106: 37–38, who are Canaanite deities.

The name Shaddai is used with El later in the Book of Job, which was once thought to be among the oldest books of the Hebrew Bible but is dated to a later period by most scholars.

The Septuagint often translates Shaddai or El Shaddai as simply "God" or "my God", but at least once also, in Ezekiel 10:5, transliterates Shaddai ("θεὸς σαδδαΐ"). In other places, it appears as "Almighty" (Greek: παντοκράτωρ), (Job 11:7, Job 22:17, Job 22:25, Job 23:16, Job 27:2, Job 34:12, Job 35:13) which is used in some translations like the King James Version.

== Etymology and meaning ==
=== Shaddai related to the wilderness ===
According to Ernst Knauf, El Shaddai means "God of the Wilderness" and did not originally have a doubled d. He argues that Shaddai is a loanword from Israelien Hebrew, where the word had a sh sound, into Judean Hebrew and hence, Biblical Hebrew, where it would have been śaday with the sound śin. In this theory, the word is related to śadé (Hebrew: שָׂדֶה, "[uncultivated] field, countryside"). He points out that the name is found in Thamudic inscriptions (ʾlšdy), in a personal name Śaday ʾammī used in Egypt from the Late Bronze Age until Achaemenid times, and even in the Punic language name ʿbdšd ("servant of Shadé/Shada").

=== Shaddai referring to a mountain ===
In a theory popularized by William F. Albright, Shaddai comes from a Semitic root found in shadû (Akkadian: 𒊭𒀜𒁺𒌑, "mountain") and in shaddāʾû/shaddûʾa ("mountain-dweller"), a name of Amurru. This theory was somewhat weakened when it was noticed that the doubling of the medial d is first documented only in the Neo-Assyrian Empire. However, the doubling in Hebrew might possibly be secondary. According to this theory, God is seen as inhabiting a holy mountain, a concept not unknown in ancient West Asian religion; Ephrem the Syrian places the Garden of Eden on an inaccessible mountaintop.

In a similar theory, El Shaddai means "God of the Mountains," in reference to the Mesopotamian divine mountain, though this could also refer to the biblical Mount Sinai where God gave Moses the Ten Commandments. According to Stephen L. Harris, the term was "one of the patriarchal names for the Mesopotamian tribal god." In the Book of Exodus, El Shaddai is identified explicitly with the God of Abraham and with Yahweh. The term El Shaddai appears chiefly in Genesis, only with a fertility association.

=== Shaddai meaning destroyer ===
Heath D. Dewrell argues that Shaddai must come from a root shadad (Hebrew: שדד) which means "to plunder, overpower, make desolate". Therefore, Dewrell concludes, Shaddai must mean "destroyer" as an epithet. This root could have descended from an original sense of "to be strong" as in the Arabic shadīd (Arabic: شديد; "strong"). The termination ai, usually the first-person possessive plural, functions as a pluralis excellentiae, such as in Adonai (Hebrew: אֲדֹנָי, "my lords") and other titles.

Some verses in the Hebrew Bible seem to play on this root shadad (Isaiah 13:6; Joel 1:15), but Knauf maintains that this is a re-etymologization.

=== Shaddai meaning breasts ===
The Hebrew noun shādayim (Hebrew: שָׁדַיִם) means "two breasts" and ultimately comes from a source meaning "to extend (lengthwise). This evolved into similar words in various Semitic languages. It has been speculated that the Tell in Syria called Tell eth-Thadeyn ("tell of the two breasts") was called Shaddai in the Amorite language.

== Shaddai in Jewish tradition ==
=== God that said "enough" ===
A popular interpretation of the name Shaddai is that it is composed of the Hebrew relative particle she- (Shin plus vowel segol followed by dagesh), or, as in this case, as sha- (Shin plus vowel patach followed by a dagesh). The noun containing the dagesh is the Hebrew word dai meaning "enough, sufficient, sufficiency". This is the same word used in the Passover Haggadah, Dayeinu, which means "It would have been enough for us". The song Dayeinu celebrates the various miracles God performed while liberating the Israelites from Egyptian servitude. The Talmud explains it this way, but says that Shaddai stands for Mi she'Amar Dai L'olamo (Hebrew: מי שאמר די לעולמו) – "He who said 'Enough' to His world." When he was forming the earth, he stopped the process at a certain point, withholding creation from reaching its full completion, and thus the name embodies God's power to stop creation. The passage appears in the tractate Hagigah 12a.

There is early support for this interpretation, in that the Septuagint translates Shadday in several places as ὁ ἱκανός, the "Sufficient One" (for example, Ruth 1:20, 21).

=== Apotropaic usage of the name Shaddai ===
The name Shaddai often appears on the devices such as amulets or dedicatory plaques. More importantly, however, it is associated with the traditional Jewish customs which could be understood as apotropaic: male circumcision, mezuzah, and tefillin. The connections of the first one with the name Shaddai are twofold: According to the biblical chronology it is El Shaddai who ordains the custom of circumcision in Genesis 17:1 and, as is apparent in midrash Tanhuma Tzav 14 (cf. a parallel passages in Tazri‘a 5 and Shemini 5) the brit milah itself is the inscription of the part of the name on the body:

The Holy One, blessed be He, has put His name on them so they would enter the garden of Eden. And what is the name and the seal that He had put on them? It is Shaddai. [The letter] shin He put in the nose, dalet – on the hand, whereas yod on the {circumcised} [membrum]. Accordingly, {when} He goes to {His eternal home} (Ecclesiastes 12:5), there is an angel {appointed} in the garden of Eden who picks up every son of which is circumcised and brings him {there}. And those who are not circumcised? Although there are two letters of the name Shaddai present on them, {namely} shin from the nose and dalet from the hand, the yod (...) is {missing}. Therefore it hints at a demon (Heb. shed), which brings him down to Gehenna.

Analogous is the case with mezuzah – a piece of parchment with two passages from the Book of Deuteronomy, curled up in a small encasement and affixed to a doorframe. At least since the Geonic times, the name Shaddai is often written on the back of the parchment containing the shema‘ and sometimes also on the casing itself. The name is traditionally interpreted as being an acronym of shomer daltot Yisrael ("the guardian of the doors of Israel") or shomer dirot Yisrael ("the guardian of the dwellings of Israel"). However, this notarikon itself has its source most probably in Zohar Va’ethanan where it explains the meaning of the word Shaddai and connects it to mezuzah.

The name Shadday can also be found on tefillin – a set of two black leather boxes strapped to head and arm during the prayers. The binding of particular knots of tefillin is supposed to resemble the shape of the letters: the leather strap of the tefillah shel rosh is knotted at the back of the head thus forming the letter dalet whereas the one that is passed through the tefillah shel yad forms a yod-shaped knot. In addition to this, the box itself is inscribed with the letter shin on two of its sides.

== Biblical translations ==
The Septuagint (and other early translations) translate Shaddai as "παντοκράτωρ", which means "ruler over everything", not "The Almighty". However, in the Greek of the Septuagint translation of Psalm 91:1 (90:1), Shaddai is translated as "the God of heaven".

The Latin translation of "παντοκράτωρ" in the Vulgate is "omnipotens", which literally translates as "Almighty" and this was later used in most modern English Bibles, including the popular New International Version and Good News Bible.

The translation team behind the New Jerusalem Bible (N.J.B.), however, maintains that the meaning is uncertain, and that translating El Shaddai as "Almighty God" is inaccurate. The N.J.B. leaves it untranslated as Shaddai, and makes footnote suggestions that it should perhaps be understood as "God of the Mountain" from the Akkadian shadu, or "God of the open wastes" from the Hebrew sadeh and the secondary meaning of the Akkadian word. The translation in the Concordant Old Testament is 'El Who-Suffices'.

== In Mandaeism ==
In Book 5, Chapter 2 of the Right Ginza, part of Mandaean holy scripture of the Ginza Rabba, El Shaddai is mentioned as ʿIl-Šidai.

== Bibliography ==
- "Names of God: Shaddai and 'Elyon". Jewish Encyclopedia.
- Day, John (2000). Yahweh and the Gods and Goddesses of Canaan. London: Burns & Oates. ISBN 1-85075-986-3.
- Lutzky, Harriet (1998). "Shadday as a Goddess Epithet". Vetus Testamentum. 48 (1). Brill: 15–36. doi:10.1163/1568533982721839. ISSN 0042-4935. JSTOR 1585459.
- MacLaurin, E. C. B. (1962). "YHWH, the Origin of the Tetragrammaton". Vetus Testamentum. 12 (4). Brill: 439–463. doi:10.2307/1516934. ISSN 0042-4935. JSTOR 1516934.
- Steins, G. (1974). "שדי šadday". In Botterweck, G. Johannes; Ringgren, Helmer; Fabry, Heinz-Josef (eds.). Theological Dictionary of the Old Testament. Vol. XIV. Wm. B. Eerdmans Publishing. pp. 418–446. ISBN 978-0-8028-2345-8.
