= Tell eth-Thadeyn =

Tell eth-Thadeyn is a tell in Syria. The name means "tell of the two breasts" in Arabic, and it has been speculated that in the Amorite language it was called "Shaddai". The word in Hebrew (closely related to Amorite) for "two breasts" is "shadaim", and "shadai" means "my breasts". Note that this word does not double the "d" (daleth).

It has been speculated that it is the site of the Bronze Age city of Tuttul because "Tuttul" means "two breasts" in the Sumerian language though this is not generally accepted.

== See also ==
- El Shaddai
