= Kingdom of Ḫana =

Ancient Syrian kingdom

Hana
- c. 1760 BC–c. 1420 BC
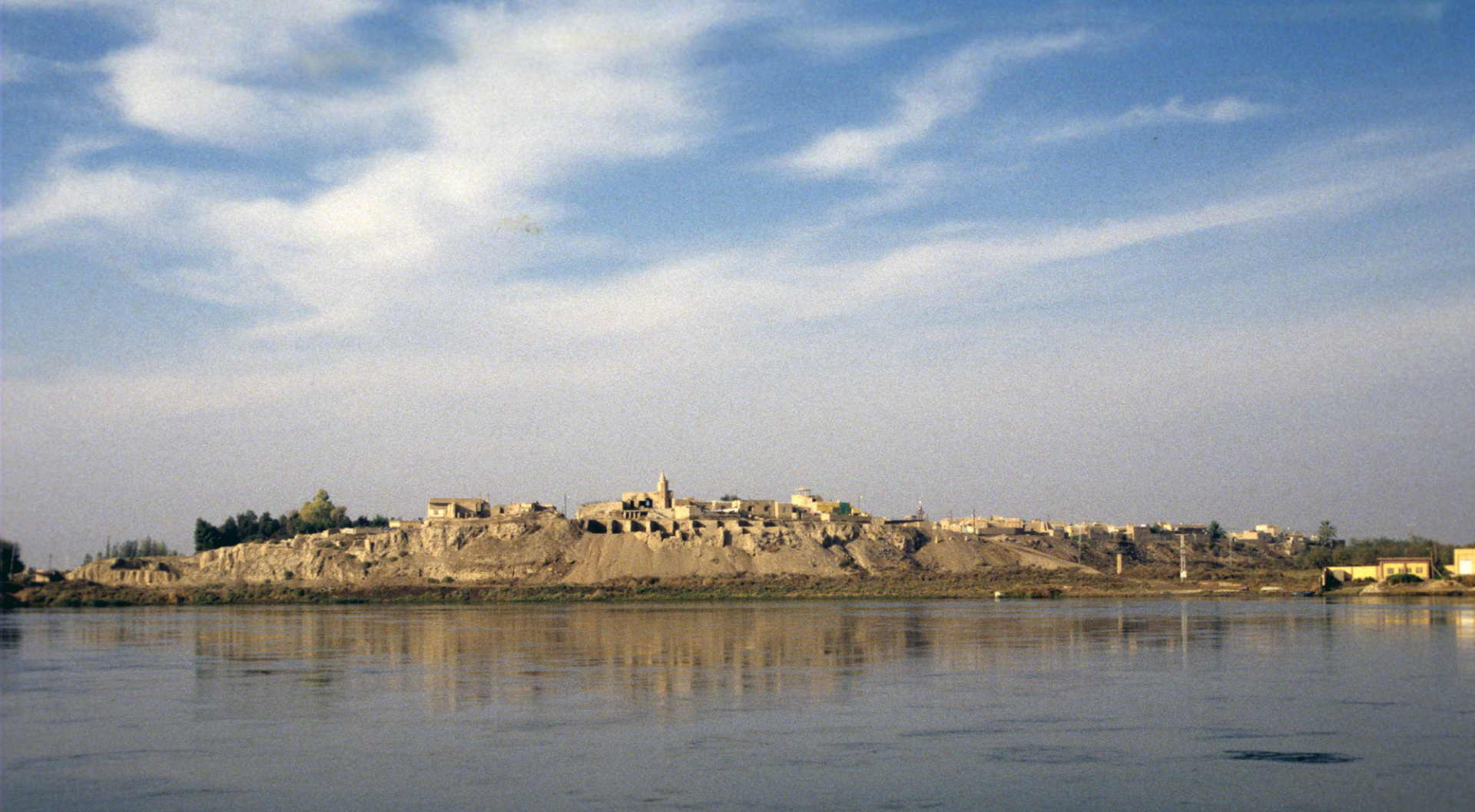
- Terqa might have been the capital of Hana
- Government: Absolute monarchy
- Monarch
  - c. 1755 BC (first): Iapah-sumu-abu
  - c. 1420 BC (last): Pagiru
- History
  - Established: c. 1760 BC
  - Disestablished: c. 1420 BC

The Kingdom of Ḫana (KUR ḫa-ni-i "Land of Ḫana"; Khana) was the Syrian kingdom from Hana Land in the middle Euphrates region north of Mari, which included the ancient city of Terqa. The kingdom was a successor to the Kingdom of Mari and emerged during the decline of the First Babylonian Dynasty. A newer view is that only the initial six rulers lived during that time and that after an interregnum, Ḫana re-emerged in the Middle Babylonian period under the last six kings. The Low Chronology dating scheme for Hana has gained much support. The kingdom was located on the Euphrates River close to the junction of the Khabur River. Its capital was the town of Terqa or Saggarâtum.

== Location ==
The kingdom of Hana was located on territories formerly ruled by the sovereigns of Mari. The rulers of Mari held the title "King of Mari, Tuttul and the land of Hana". Since Mari was abandoned after its destruction by Hammurabi around 1759 BC and Tuttul certainly was not part of the territories of the new state, the location of Hana is identified with the territories around Mari. Its capital Terqa was located 45 km north of Mari below the junction of Khabur River, roughly at the site of the modern Syrian town of Asharah.

== History ==
=== The Hanaeans ===
The Hanaeans were a nomadic tribal confederacy based around the Euphrates River on what is now the Syrian-Iraqi border. The Hanaean people led a semi-nomadic life characterized by seasonal movement of the sheep herds, never too far from the rivers and watering places, returning to their settlements for the harvest season. Based on onomastic evidence they were related to the other West Semitic peoples known as the Amorites, such as the Yaminites, Rabbians, and Habiru, originally coming from the deserts of Syria. The contact with the settled population leads to gradual transformation of the population into more settled rural communities.

The history of the Hanaeans is closely linked to the kingdom of Mari. They were strongly presented in the Euphrates and Khabur valleys. Records indicate that the area around Terqa could muster several thousand in times of need. The Hanaeans were widely used as soldiers by the rulers of Mari after their subduing by king Yahdun-Lim. Within the armed forces of Mari they were grouped by clans of which about 10 are known.

An independent kingdom under the leadership of Mari, the kingdom fell to Babylon when Hammurabi destroyed Mari.

Under Zimri-Lim of Mari, Hana was part of the Kingdom of Mari. In Year 33 of Hammurabi of Babylon (c. 1760 BC) he attacked and destroyed Mari. In Year 35 (c. 1758 BC) he returned to destroy the city walls.

==== 1st Kingdom of Hana ====
Following the fall of Mari around 1760 BC, the Kingdom of Hana formed establishing its capital at Terqa. Terqa had formerly been a provincial center in the Mari Kingdom. It came to control much of the territory formerly held by Mari, in the Middle Euphrates and Lower Khabur.

During the reign of the Babylonian king Abi-Eshuh, Babylon lost its territories on the middle Euphrates where the kingdom of Hana was formed. No direct evidence is available on the relationship of the new state and its kings with the last Babylonian rulers from the First Dynasty.

Mursili I of the Hittites marched from Hattusa through the Euphrates valley and Sacked Babylon around 1595 BC. The event brought to an end the Old Babylonian period. It implies he had support from the Haneans. In an anecdote, the Kassite ruler Agum II of Babylon brought back from Hana the Statue of Marduk. The statue had been in Hana since Mursili I of the Hittites sacked Babylon.

==== 2nd Kingdom of Hana ====
The kingdom was probably conquered around 1420 BC by the Hurrian kingdom of Mitanni.

== The Kassite domination ==
There is some evidence about a link between the Kingdom of Hana and the Kassites who came to dominate Babylonia in the following centuries. From the preserved list of rulers of Ḫana the name of one king, Khashtiliash, notably suggests a Kassite origin. There is also a Kassite element in the name of a canal dug by one of the other rulers.

One dedicatory inscription preserved in later copies records the return of Marduk’s statue from Hana by Agum II, a later Kassite king, most probably the first to rule over most of Babylon. The part of the inscription that mentions Hana reads:

I sent to the distant land, to the land of the Haneans and they conducted Marduk and Sarpanitu back to me. I returned Marduk and Sarpanitu, the ones who love my reign, to the Esagil and Babylon. I returned them to the temple that Shamash had confirmed to me in my investigation.

Even if the text does not convey clearly the relationship between the Kassite Agum II and "the Haneans" at that point, it nevertheless links Hana with the sack of Babylon by the Hittite king Mursili I around 1595 BC and the subsequent takeover by the Kassite dynasty in Babylonia. It is possible that after the initial clashes with Babylon's Samsu-iluna, the Kassites, originally coming from the Zagros Mountains, withdrew north occupying and imposing control over middle Euphrates including the lands of Hana. It is also reasonable to assume some sort of cooperation between Hittite and Hana as the invading armies of Mursili I must have passed through its territories. Such alliance may have facilitated the seizing of power in Babylon by the Kassites some years after the Hittite retreat.

This later Neo-Assyrian inscription copy, which purports to detail the return of cult statues of the city of Babylon, lost in the fall of that city, from Hana is generally considered to be a forgery.

== See also ==
- Chronology of the ancient Near East
- Cities of the Ancient Near East
- List of Mesopotamian dynasties
- List of Mesopotamian deities
- Qaṭṭunān
