= Tuttul =

Archaeological site in Syria

Tell Bi'a
- Tuttul
- Location within Syria Location within Near East
- 35°57′27″N 39°02′51″E
- Type: archaeological site
- Location: Raqqa Governorate, Syria
- Region: Upper Mesopotamia

Site notes
- Excavation dates: 1980-1995
- Archaeologists: Eva Strommenger

Tuttul (Akkadian: tu-ut-tu-ul^{ki}, Ugaritic: 𐎚𐎚𐎍 – TTL) was an ancient Near East city. Tuttul is identified with the archaeological site of Tell Bi'a (also Tall Bi'a) in Raqqa Governorate, Syria. Tell Bi'a is located near the modern city of Raqqa and at the confluence of the rivers Balikh and Euphrates.

== Archaeology ==
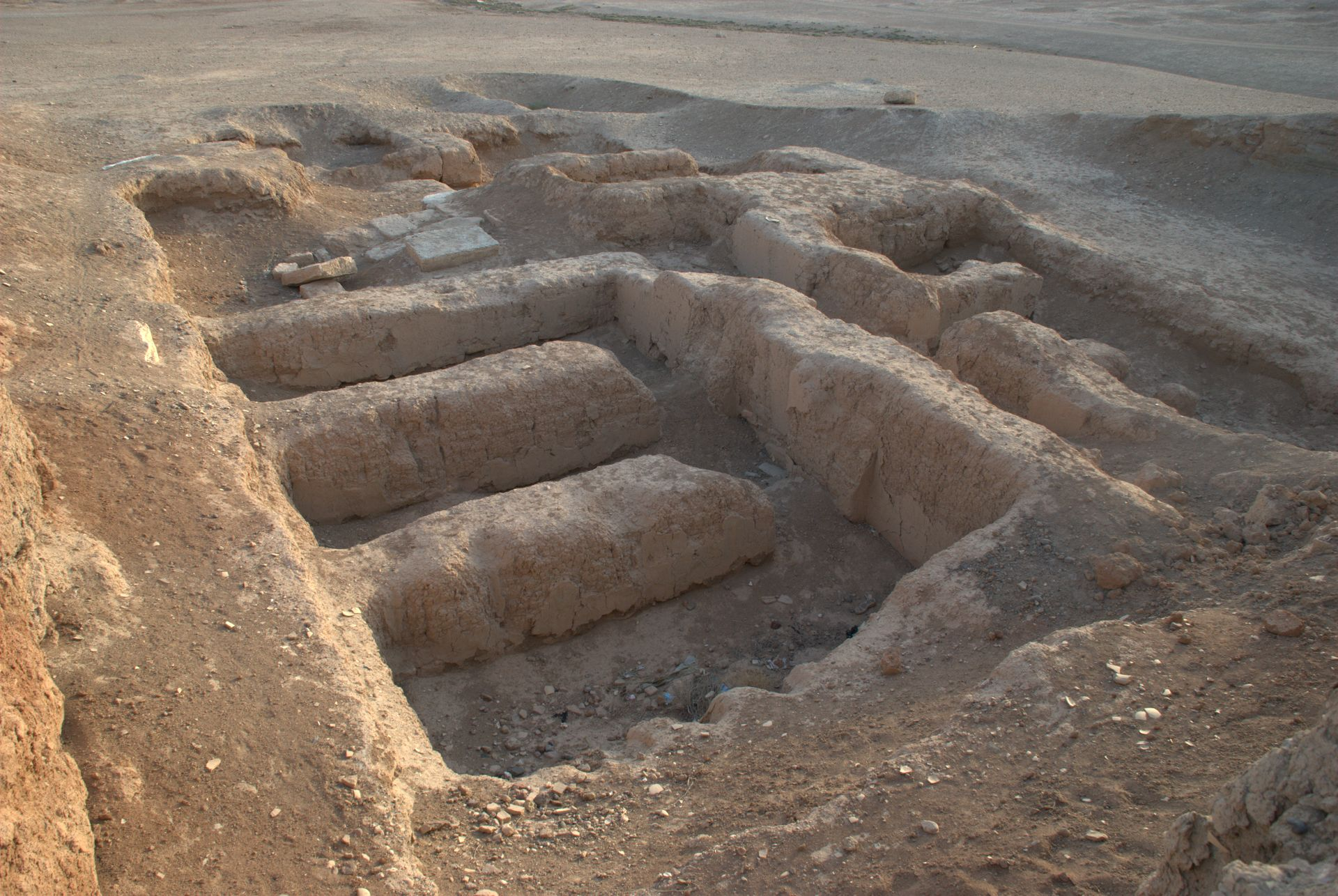
Early Dynastic tombs at Tuttul

The site has an area of about 40 hectares with the main mound and a few subsidiary mounds surrounded by small mounds which are the remains of a city wall. After studying texts at Mari, Georges Dossin traveled to a site he called "Tell Biya" and identified it as Tuttul, ending much speculation as to its location. Tuttul appeared often in the texts from Mari.

Excavation was conducted in twelve seasons between 1980 and 1995 by a team from the Deutsche Orient-Gesellschaft led by Eva Strommenger. The focus of the excavation has been on the central mound, Mound E. It was topped by the remains of a Byzantine-era monastery, including a church, with intact mosaic floors, and a refectory with omega-shaped benches.

The level below the monastery is Old Babylonian (early 2nd millennium BC) with a palace termed the "Young/New Palace". This was where cuneiform tablets dated to the last years of the Ekallatum ruler (later ruler of the Upper Kingdom of Mesopotamia) Shamshi-Adad I (c. 1800 BC) were found.

Below that level was an "Old Palace" of the Early Dynastic III Eblaite period and a large public building of the Akkadian Empire period. Some Early Dynastic I period remains were found below that and the water table was encountered before virgin soil was reached. A few private homes adjacent to the city wall on Mound B South were also excavated.

At the Early Dynastic level on the southern end of Mound E six above ground multichambered rectilinear royal tombs were found. The tombs had been looted in antiquity, but contained human and animal bones, jewelry, inlaid furniture, and a large array of pottery. Thirty two individuals (14 female, the rest adult and semi-adult males) were identified. One was intact and was accompanied by a flat axe, two shaft-hole axes, a quiver with a bronze base, and a dagger. An extramural cemetery from the same period was found 700 m (2,300 ft) away with graves of much poorer quality. In 2002 a geomagnetic prospection of the Early Bronze Age area of Mound D was conducted. It showed a 30 m (98 ft) square building near Palace A and remains of a wall around the palace complex.

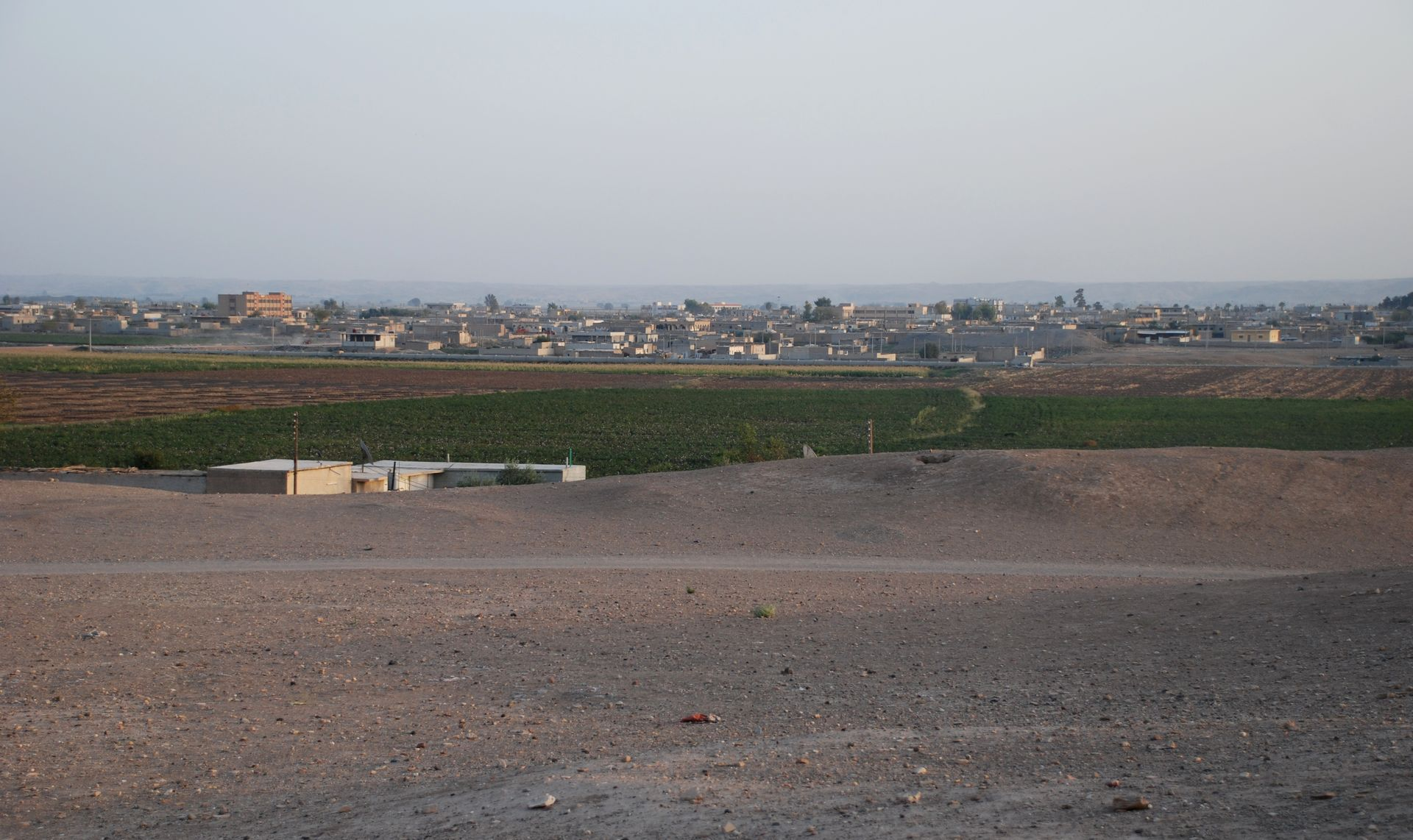
Tell Bi'a with Raqqa in the background

A satellite survey of site in Syria showed that the site had been heavily looted during the Syrian Civil War, which started in 2011. The site has also been heavily damaged by tunneling and creation of a detention camp. Based on remote sensing, the site has now been subject to mechanized looting.

== History ==
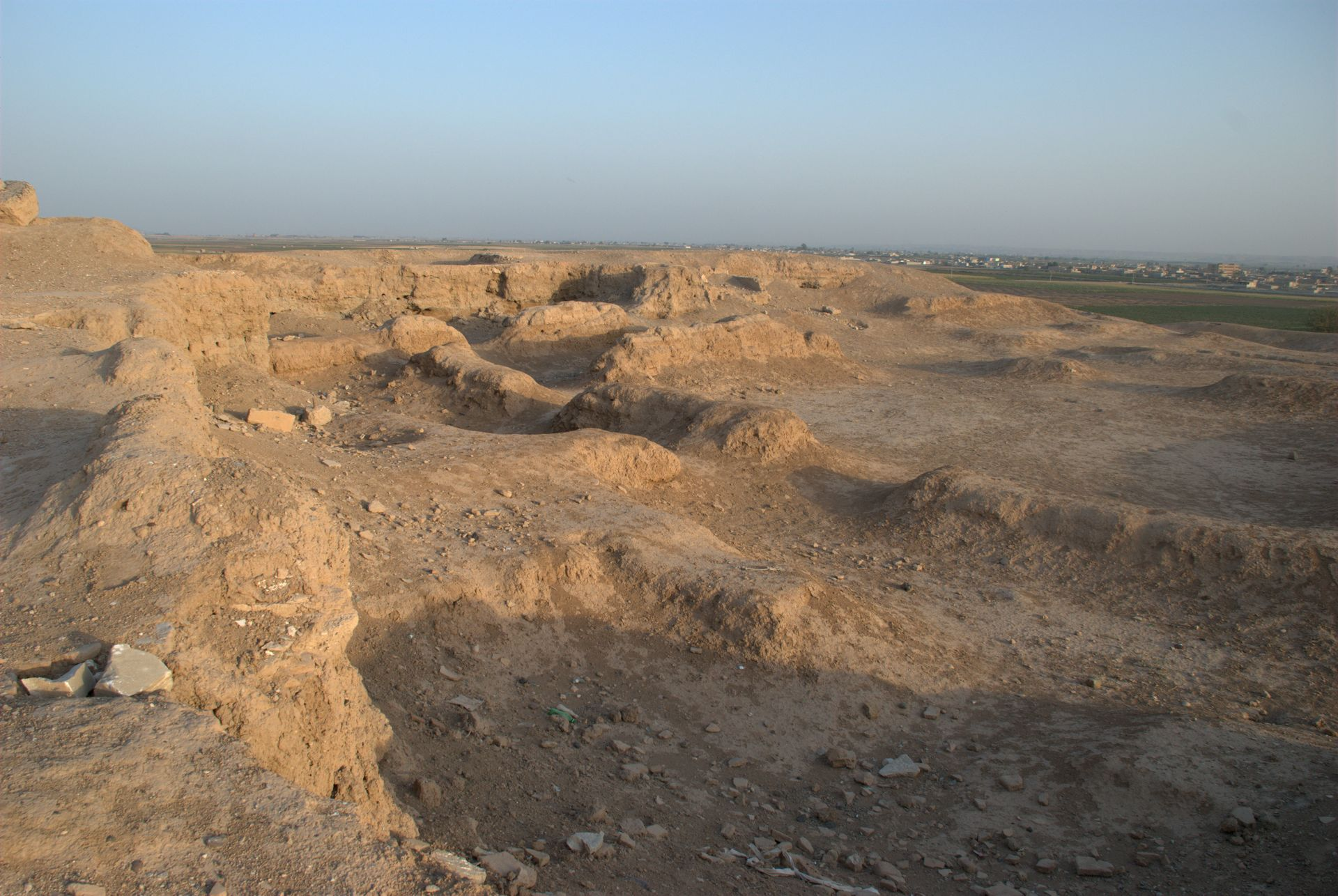
The site of Tuttul from center to the East

=== Chalcolithic ===
The site has been occupied since the Uruk period (late 4th millennium BC) based on pottery shards.

=== Early Bronze Age ===
In the Early Bronze IV (c. 2350-2020 BCE), Tuttul appears in records of the Early Bronze IVA (c. 2350-2150 BCE, Akkadian period).

==== Akkadian Period ====
Early Bronze IVA. The earliest written record of Tuttul was during the time of the Akkadian Empire when Sargon (2334–2279 BC), the first ruler of the empire, recorded in a text "Sargon, the king bowed down to the god Dagan in Tuttul. He (the god Dagan) gave to him (Sargon) the Upper Land: Mari, Iarmuti, and Ebla far as the Cedar Forest and the Silver Mountains.".

Tuttul was later mentioned by his Sargon's grandson Naram-Sin of Akkad (c. 2254–2218 BC), as one of the cities whose god was asked for him to become deified.

"In view of the fact that he protected the foundations of his city from danger, (the citizens of) his city requested from Astar in Eanna, Enlil in Nippur, Dagan in Tuttul, Ninhursag in Kes, Ea in Eridu, Sin in Ur, Samas in Sippar, (and) Nergal in Kutha, that (Naram-Sin) be (made) the god of their city, and they built within Agade a temple (dedicated) to him."

==== Ur III period ====
Early Bronze IVB. Tuttul is unrecorded during the Ur III period aside from a mention in one of the campaign records of the ruler Shu-Sin. It has been suggested that the Duduli encountered in Ur III texts on occasion is Tuttul.

=== Middle Bronze ===
During the Middle Bronze Age (c. 2000–1600 BC), Tuttul was a sacred city to the god Dagan, who was a storm god in the region of Mari, Terqa and Tuttul. His two main temples were at Tuttul and Terqa and his wife Shalash was also worshiped at Tuttul. The god Mullil (another name for Enlil) was also said to "dwell" in Tuttul. The Hurrian version of Dagan, Kumarbi, was also worshiped there. There was also a temple of the "River-god" at Tuttul, a poorly understood entity which has been suggested as the deified Euphrates, which was recorded as receiving sacrifices.

A number of cuneiform tablets were found at the site, mostly in the Old Babylonian palace. About 51 were used in fill and are somewhat older, thought to be from the Isin-Larsa period. The rest came from the time of Yasmah-Adad. Two tablets were somewhat later in date. There is also a bronze axe, from the antiquities market, inscribed ""Il'e-Lim, lord of Tuttul".

==== Middle Bronze IIA ====
Tuttul is then mentioned in a year name of Yahdun-Lim (c. 1800 BC) the Amorite ruler of Mari, "Year in which Yahdun-Lim was victorious against the Yaminites and ... at the gate of Tutul". In his royal tutelary he was named as "Yahdun-Lim, son of Iaggid-Lim, king of Mari, Tuttul, and the land of Hana, mighty king, who controls the banks of the Euphrates ...". In a brick inscription from the building of the Shamash temple in Mari he recorded a revolt against his rule that included Tuttul. This revolt was supported by Sumu-Epuh, ruler of Yamhad.

"... In that same year, — La'um, king of Samanum and the land of the Ubrabium, Bahlu-kullim, king of Tuttul and the land of the Amnanum, Aialum, king of Abattum and the land of the Rabbum — these kings rebelled against him. The troops of Sumu-Epuh of the land of Iamhad came as auxiliary troops (to rescue him) and in the city of Samanum the tribes gathered together against him, but by means of(his) mighty weapon he defeated these three kings of ... He vanquished their troops and their auxiliaries and inflicted a defeat on them. He heaped up their dead bodies. He tore down their walls and made them into mounds of rubble."

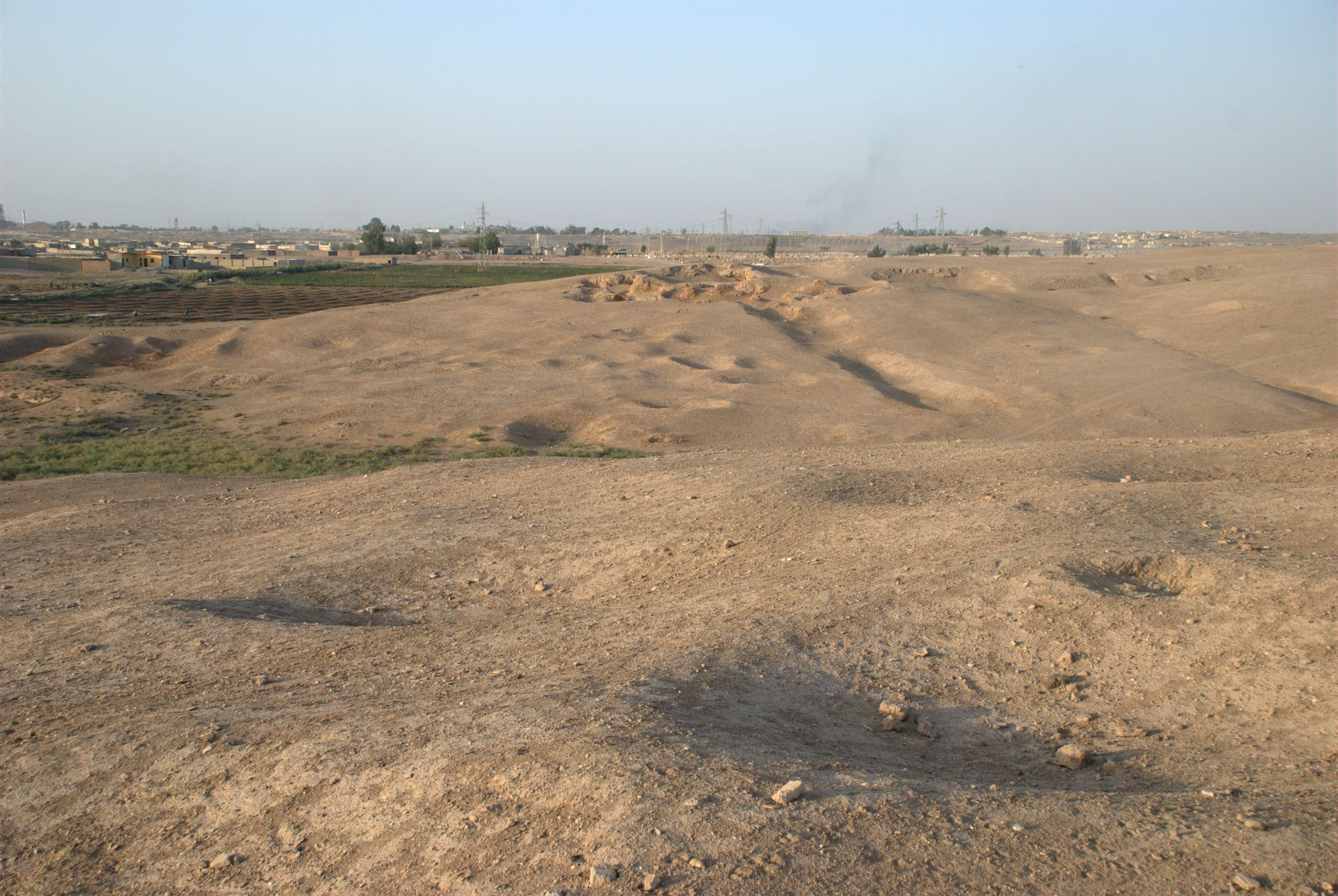
Site of Tuttul West to North

Zimri-Lim, ruler or Mari, son of Yahdun-Lim and contemporary of Hammurabi of the First Babylonian Empire also included Tuttul in his royal tutelary. Hammurabi defeated Mari and the surrounding region in the 33rd year of his reign, presumably including Tuttul.

=== Late Bronze ===
It appears that during the period, the Late Bronze Age, Tuttul served only as a small cultic center for Dagan.

This town has sometimes also been called the "Northern Tuttul" or "Tuttul on the Balih" with reference to an implied "Southern Tuttul", which was possibly located on the Middle Euphrates between the ancient cities of Mari and Babylon. However, this is a debated issue. The identification of the so-called "Southern Tuttul" with modern Hit is uncertain, as Hit is referenced to several times in the Mari archives via its modern name.

==== Late Bronze IIB ====
Though there is no archaeological evidence at the site, Tuttul is mentioned in late 2nd millennium BC New Kingdom Hittite and Middle Assyrian texts, as the two empires contested for that region.

=== Byzantine period ===
In the Byzantine period a large monastery was built. Its period of use is unknown, but one of the mosaics is dateable to the 6th century AD.

== See also ==
- Cities of the ancient Near East
- List of Mesopotamian dynasties
- List of Mesopotamian deities
- Qaṭṭunān
- Saggarâtum
