= Saggarâtum =

Ancient Mesopotamian city

Saggarâtum (sa-ga-ra-tum^{ki}) was a city in the ancient Near East which is still unlocated though it is known to have been on the Habur River, a tributary of the Euphrates. In texts from Ebla it is called "Sag-gar^{ki}". One proposal is that other readings of the name were "Sapiratum" or "Sapirete" though this is generally thought to be a different cities. Another suggestion is that by the 1st millennium BC it had become "Sangarite". Saggarâtum is also mentioned in the texts of Eshnunna ruler Ilūni.

Saggarâtum was a river port and known to have been the location of one of the kingdoms icehouses and a source of truffles. In a text from Yaqqim-Addu I, governor of Saggarâtum, to his king Zimri-Lim he wrote:

"Ever since I reached Saggaratum five days ago, I have continuously dispatched truffles to my lord. But my lord wrote me: 'You have sent me bad truffles!' But my lord ought not to condemn(?) with regards to the truffles. I have sent my lord what they have picked for me..."

The religion of Saggarâtum is unclear. A deity "Aštabi-Il" was mentioned in documents found at Mari. A deity, Aštabi, was known to have been worshiped at nearby Ebla in the 3rd millennium BC. It is known the cult statutes were held in Saggarâtum. It has been proposed that the Hurrian deities Teshub and Ḫepat were worshiped there though most of the personal names at Saggarâtum were Semitic.

== History ==
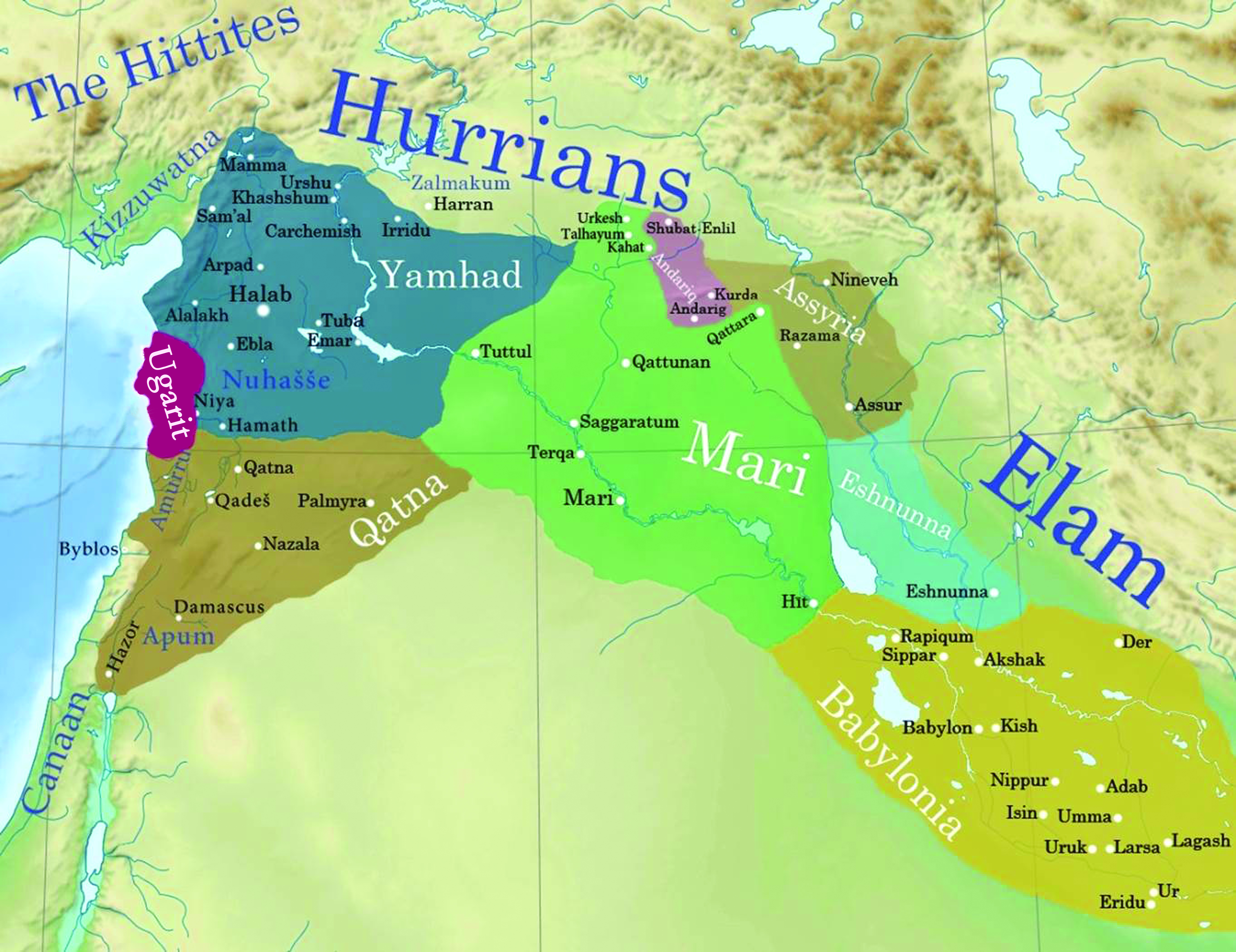
Map of Mari region - locations of Qaṭṭunān and Saggarâtum are approximate

Initially, the area of Mari, including Saggarâtum, came under the control of the Kingdom of Upper Mesopotamia ruled by Shamshi-Adad I of Ekallatum. Shamshi-Adad I assigned control of Mari to his second son Yasmah-Adad. In one text Isme-Dagan I, first son of Shamshi-Adad I, writes to Yasmah-Adad, governor of Saggarâtum: "In truth, because of the emigrees in Saggarâtum, there was rebellious activity, so that the king ordered executions there"

After the collapse of the Kingdom of Upper Mesopotamia Mari, including Saggarâtum, came under the control of the Lim dynasty of Suprum beginning with Yaggid-Lim. The 2nd ruler, Sumu-Yamam, is known from two year names one being "Year in which Sumu-Yamam built the city wall of Saggaratum". The Old Babylonian period kingdom of Mari was made up of several parts, the central districts of Mari, Terqa and Saggarâtum, Qaṭṭunān (a short distance upstream on the Habur from Saggarâtum), and Tuttul. Little is known of Qattunan (a location of Tell Fagdami has been suggested) though some of its governors were Akšak-magir, Ilušu-naṣir, Zakira-ḫammu, and Zimri-Addu. Known governors of Saggarâtum were Mášum, Itûr-Asdû (under Yasmah-Addu, also governor of Mari), (Ḫ)abduma-Dagan (died in Zimri-Lim year 1, also a governor of Tuttul), followed by Sumḫu-rabi (Zimri-Lim years 1 to 3), and Yaqqim-Addu I. Mášum, an Amorite, is notable for being contemporary to Hammurabi of Babylon in the period while Babylon was an ally/vassal of Shamshi-Adad I of Ekallatum.

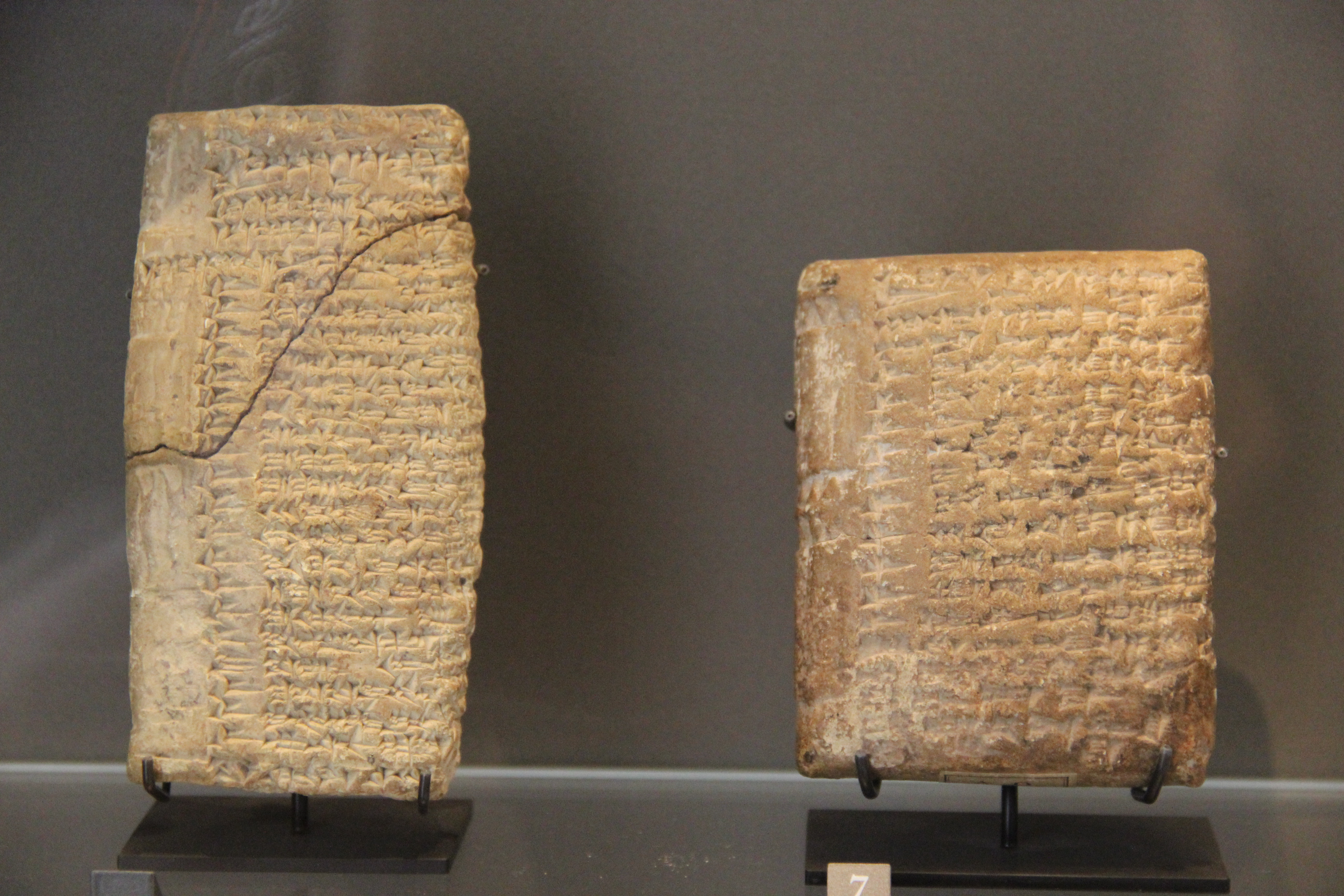
Cuneiform Tablets from Kingdom of Mari, 1st Half of 2nd Millennium BC

Under the next ruler, Zimri-Lim, Mari faced problems with incursions by tribal elements, especially the Yaminites. At one point there was a large Yaminite uprising which Zimri-Lim put down, reflected in his year name "Year in which Zimri-Lim was victorious against the Yaminites in Saggaratum and killed their kings". During the Mari period a prophet, Lupaḫumis is recorded as saying "As before, when the Yaminites came to me and settled in Saggaratum, I was the one who spoke to the king: “Do not make a treaty with the Yaminites" indicating that the Yaminites were a problem for the city. A Mari directive stated "record all of the Yaminites from Zimri-Lim’s districts of Mari, Terqa, and Saggaratum who are supposed to serve with the king’s armies". Zimri-Lim, ruler of Mari, had a palace at Saggarâtum.

After a long and successful reign which included an alliance with Babylon the kingdom of Mari, minus Mari itself which had been destroyed, fell under the control of Babylon during its expansionist phase under Hammurabi whose 33rd year name included "... overthrew in battle the army of Mari and Malgium and caused Mari and its territory and the various cities of Subartu to dwell under his authority in friendship ...". The last significant mention of Saggarâtum was in the Old Babylonian period during the reign of Samsu-iluna (c. 1749–1712 BC), seventh ruler of First Dynasty of Babylon and son of Hammurabi. His 33rd year name read "Year in which Samsu-iluna the king at the command of Shamash and Marduk restored completely all the brickwork of the city of Saggaratum".

After the fall of Babylon c. 1600 BC, Saggarâtum, along with Qaṭṭunān, became part of the Kingdom of Ḫana, with Terqa usually considered to be its capitol (though Saggarâtum has been proposed in that role as well). This continued until c. 1400 BC when Hana fell to the Mitanni Empire. After that there are no records of Saggarâtum.

== Location ==
Saggarâtum is known to have been on the Habur River, a tributary of the Euphrates river and is thought to have been near the confluence between these rivers. The site of Tell Feddeïn, 30 kilometers from the confluence, has been proposed as well as that of Tall Suwwar . A subsequent survey of the region indicated those proposals are not correct.

The town of Ziniyan (on the border with Terqa) is known to have been in the territory of Saggarâtum. Also Dur-Yasmaḫ-Addu / Dur-Yaḫdullim which has a suggested location of Tell Mohasan. And Niḫadu, Manuhatan, Zibnatum, and Dabis.

Shamshi-Adad I of Ekallatum wrote to Yasmah-Adad about a planned visit to Mari from his capitol in Shubat-Enlil saying

"What you send to Shubat-Enlil in Saggaratum let them receive in boats. From Saggaratu[m] to Qattunan. From Qattunan in wagons let the Qattunaneans ta[ke] it. Let them carry it to Shubat-Enlil."

An itinerary from the time of Shamshi-Adad I indicated that travel between his capitol at that time, Shubat-Enlil, and Saggāratum took 5 days (about 175 kilometers) and proceeded on the route Shubat-Enlil, Tilla, Aslhum, Iyatu(m), Lakusir and then Saggāratum.

Zimri-Lim took two "pilgrimages in his reign. The first proceeded to Ṣuprum, then to Terqa and then upstream of the Ḫabur, to Saggāratum, Raṣum, Tâdum, Ilānṣurā and Razamā ending at Ḫušlā where observances to Addu of Kummê were made.

It is known that there was a canal between Saggarâtum and Suprum. Suprum, upstream of Mari, was the home of the Lim dynasty and Tell Abu Hassan has been suggested for its location.

Saggarâtum has also been said to be near the Kingdom of Hana and possibly at Tell Abu Ha'it.

The site of Chagar Bazar has also been suggested.

== See also ==
- Cities of the Ancient Near East
