= Terqa =

Ancient city in Syria

- Location within Syria
- 34°55′24″N 40°34′10″E
- Location: Syria
- Region: Deir ez-Zor Governorate

Site notes
- Excavation dates: 1910, 1974-2010
- Archaeologists: Ernst Herzfeld, Giorgio Buccellati, Marilyn Kelly-Buccellati

Terqa is an ancient city discovered at the site of Tell Ashara on the banks of the middle Euphrates in Deir ez-Zor Governorate, Syria, approximately 80 kilometres (50 mi) from the modern border with Iraq and 64 kilometres (40 mi) north of the ancient site of Mari, Syria. Its name had become Sirqu by Neo-Assyrian times. In the early 2nd millennium BC Amorite period of the city the principal god of Terqa was Dagan.

Terqa was located near the mouth of the Khabur river, thus being a trade hub on the Euphrates and Khabur rivers. To the south was Mari. To the north was Tuttul (Tell Bi'a) near the mouth of the Balikh river. Terqa ruled a larger hinterland. Terqa was always second to Mari, as the valley could hold only one political main center. The region was dominated by arid/non-irrigable land, with a characteristic relationship to water resources and land exploitation.

There were two cities named Terqa, one to the east which lay on the Diyala River and the other in the west (the topic of this article) on the Euphrates River. This was not initially known which has caused some confusion on the reading of textual references to Terqa. The eastern Terqa was near Gutian territory.

== History ==
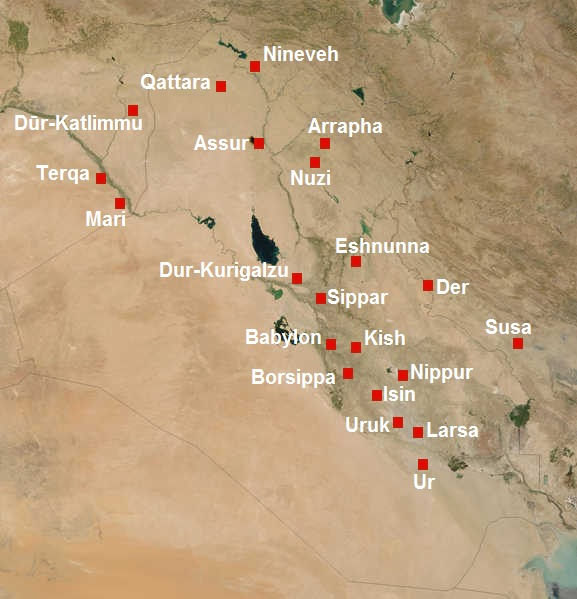
Mesopotamia in 2nd millennium BC

It is known that the site was occupied at least as early as the Halaf period.

=== Early Bronze ===
In the Early Bronze IIIB, Ebla and Mari competed for hegemony in the Euphrates region and Terqa became a contested town.

In EB IVA, the Akkadian Empire took control.

Terqa was an urban center with a massive defensive wall, but a provincial city under the political control of Mari.

In Early Bronze IVB, the Ur III dynasty had governors at Mari, which may have included Terqa as well.

=== Middle Bronze ===
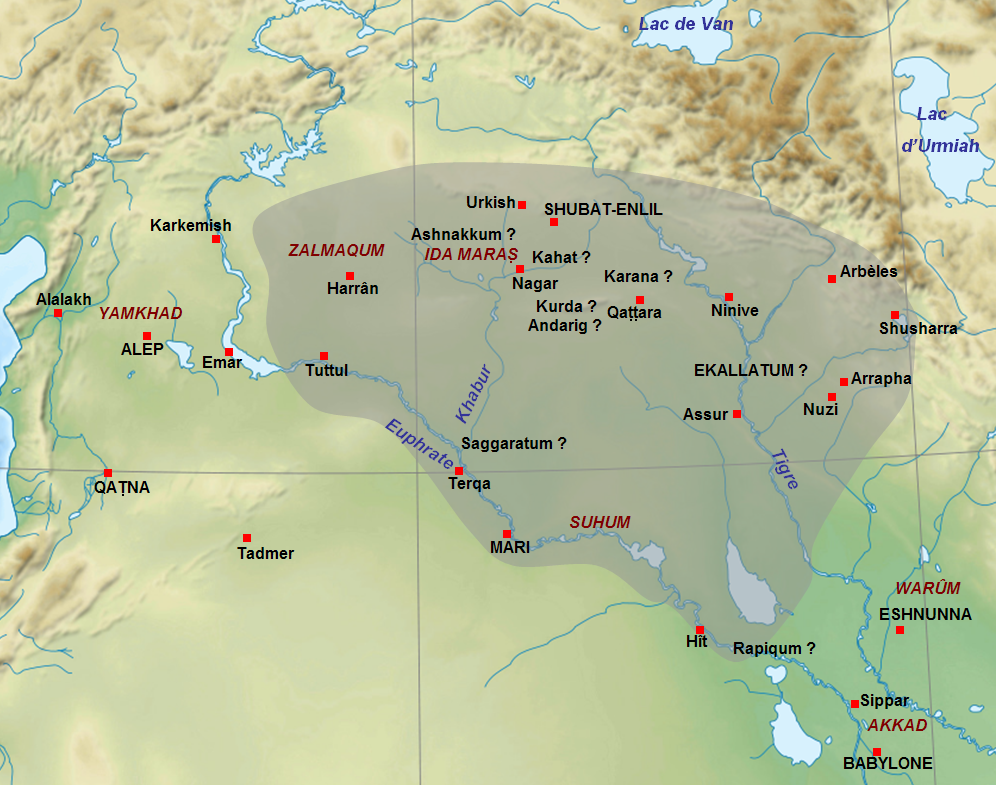
Map of Mesopotamia during the kingdom of Shamshi-Adad I showing the location of Suhum, the homeland of Suteans

During the Old Babylonian period the city was mostly in the sphere of influence of Mari. One ruler of Mari, Amorite Yahdun-Lim (c. 1820-1750 BC), commemorated it in one year-name: "Year in which Yahdun-Lim built the city walls of Mari and Terqa". It had contact other cites in the region. A pendant of a servant to Isin high official Kudur-Mabuk (19th century BC) was found at the site.

It came under the control of Shamshi-Adad (c. 1808–1776 BC) of the Amorite Kingdom of Upper Mesopotamia. In an inscription he reported building a temple of Dagan at Terqa. With the fall of the Kingdom of Upper Mesopotamia Mari regained control over the region under Zimri-Lim (c. 1775 to 1761 BC). One year name of Zimri-Lim was "Year in which Zimri-Lim offered a great throne to Dagan of Terqa". Terqa was a vassal city-state ruled by a governor subordinate to Mari. Kibri-Dagan, governor of Terqa, under Zimri-Lim.

In Mari Letter ARM 13.110 concerns the Temple of Dagan. Letter by Kibri-Dagan governor of Terqa to the king: "My lord wrote me about the 10 minas of silver that offenders settled to me: This is silver must arrive quickly to be processed for the works on the throne of Dagan.

In a major change of events, the 'Fall of Mari' came when Hammurabi of Babylon (r. 1792-1750 BC) attacked his former ally, Zimri-Lim of Mari (r. 1775 to 1761 BC) and sacked Mari. With Mari destroyed a power vacumn arose in the Middle Euphrates which came to be filled by the kingdom of Ḫana.

Terqa became a leading city, along wih Saggarâtum, of the kingdom of Ḫana and is generally though to have been its capital.

Ruler	Proposed reign	Notes
Yapah-Sumu	circa 1700	
Isi-Sumu-Abu		
Yadikh-Abu		Contemporary of Samsu-iluna of Babylon, 7 year names known
Kastiliyasu		4 year names known
Sunuhru-Ammu		4 year names known
Ammi-Madar	16th century	1 year name known
... several other kings omitted ...		

=== Late Bronze ===
In mid-15th century BC, Terqa came under the control of the Mitanni kingdom. Kings Sinia and Qiš-Addu ruled during the time of the Mitanni kings Sausadatra, Sa'itarna and Parattarna.

Ruler	Proposed reign	Notes
Sinia (Qiš-Addu served as governor)
Qiš-Addu (under Parattarna of Mitanni)	mid-15th century	
Iddin-Kakka	late 15th century	
Isar-Lim	late 15th century	1 year name known
Yaggid-Lim (Iggid-Lim, son of Isar-Lim)		
Isih-Dagan		1 year name known
Hammurapih		3 year names known
Parshatatar		Mitanni king

According to Podany (2014),

"The kings who called themselves "king of the land of Hana" and who were not associated with the names of Mittanian rulers (i.e., those other than Sinia and Qiš-Addu [both mid-15th century]) ruled for at least seven and perhaps as many as eight generations. The first four passed the throne from father to son: Iddin-Kakka [late 15th century] → Išar-Lim → Iggid-Lim → Isih-Dagan [early 14th century].

In her article, Eva von Dassow (2022) provides a chronological chart (p. 471) illustrating the time of Qis-Addu, and how his rule was contemporary to other monarchs of his time. His rule is shown to span the time of three Mitanni kings, named as "Saustatar, Saitarna, and Parattarna II".

=== Iron Age ===
Later, it fell into the sphere of the Neo-Assyrian Empire. A basalt stele was allegedly found by accident at Tell Ashara in 1940. An Akkadian cuneiform inscription had been added to the stele at a later date mentioning the Assyrian ruler Tukulti-Ninurta II (890 to 884 BC), his father Adad-nîrârî II and local Aramaean tribes of the Laqê people.

== Archaeology ==
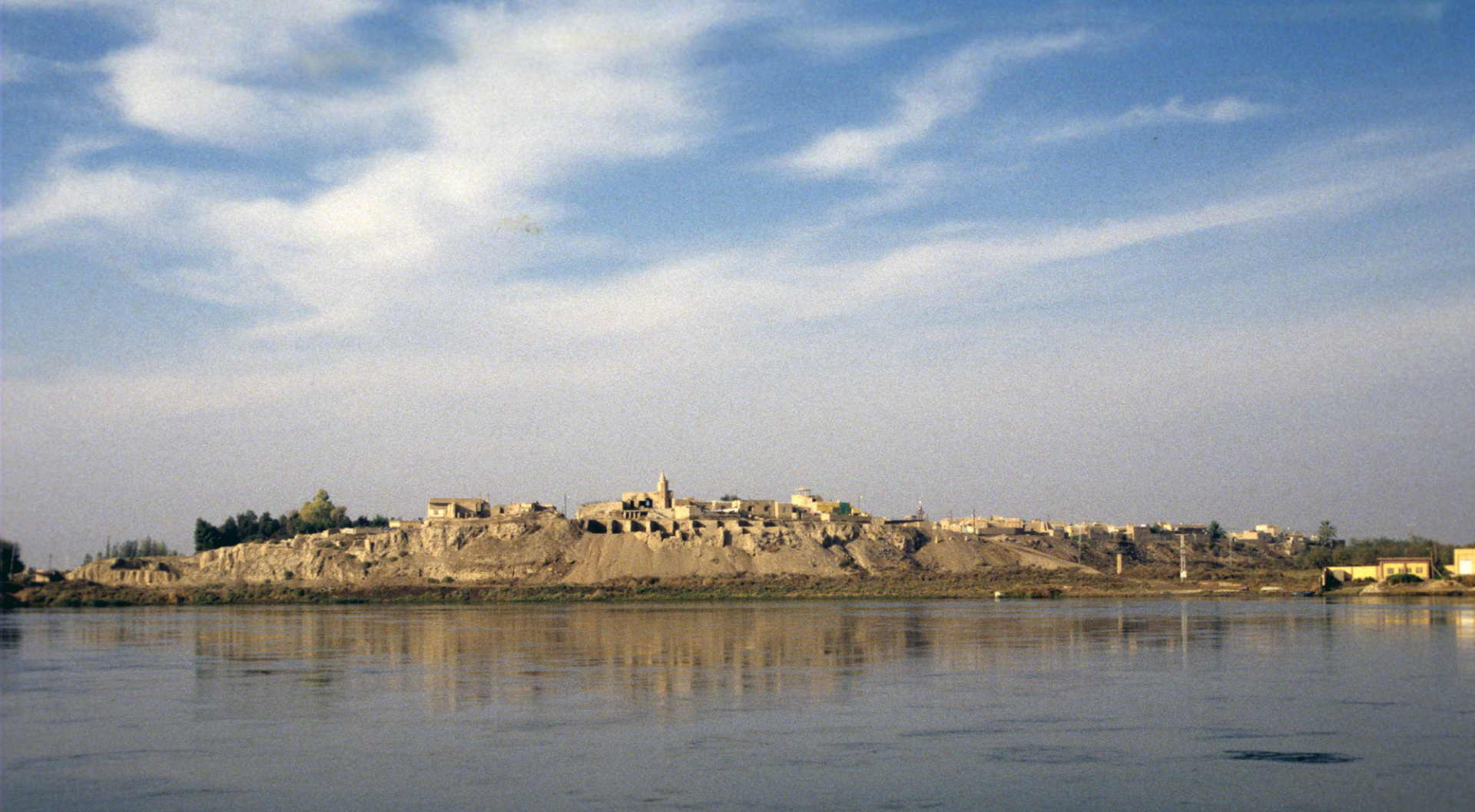
Terqa - Tell Ashara

The main site is around 20 acres (8.1 ha) in size and has a height of 60 feet (18 m). Two thirds of the remains of Terqa are covered by the modern town of Ashara, which limits the possibilities for excavation. It is estimated that about half of the original site has been eroded away by the Euphrates river as it slowly shifts its course.

The site was briefly excavated by Ernst Herzfeld in 1910. In 1923, 5 days of excavations were conducted by François Thureau-Dangin and P. Dhorrne.

From 1974 to 1986, Terqa was excavated for 10 seasons by a team from the International Institute for Mesopotamian Area Studies including the Institute of Archaeology at the University of California at Los Angeles, California State University at Los Angeles, Johns Hopkins University, the University of Arizona and the University of Poitiers in France. The team was led by Giorgio Buccellati and Marilyn Kelly-Buccellati. The final reports from these excavations have been released over time. The same team also excavated the nearby (5 kilometers north) 4th Millennium site of Tell Qraya which they viewed as the probably source for the settlement of Terqa. After 1987, a French team led by Olivier Rouault of Lyon University took over the dig and continued to work there until local conditions deteriorated around 2010.

There are 550 cuneiform tablets from Terqa held at the Deir ez-Zor Museum.

An Early Bronze Age (c. 2650–2450 BC) stone tomb with two chambers was found. The smaller chamber contained luxury grave goods (jars, plates, ostrich eggshells, pieces of ancient jewellery, etc) and the larger chamber two skeletons. One skeleton was of a 45–50 years old robust male and the other a 40–44 years old female (as well as an adult sheep). DNA analysis was conducted for both skeltons.

Notable features found at Terqa include

- A city wall, consisting of three concentric masonry walls, 20 feet (6.1 m) high and 60 feet (18 m) in width, fronted by a 60-foot-wide (18 m) moat. The walls encompass a total area of around 60 acres (24 ha) with a perimeter of around 1800 meters. Based on ceramic and radiocarbon dating the inner wall was built c. 2900 B.C., the middle wall c. 2800 BC and the outer wall c. 2700 BC and the fortifications were in use until at least 2000 BC.
- A temple to Ninkarrak dating at least as old as the 3rd millennium. The temple finds included Egyptian scarabs.
- The House of Puzurum, occupied roughly from 1750 BC to 1650 BC, where a large and important archive of Kingdom of Ḫana Period tablets, mostly contracts for purchases of land and houses in the Terqa area, were found. The location produced a number of sealing (on tablets, tags, and bullae). Many of the tablets are dated to the time of ruler Yadib-Abu. A few Mari Period sealings were found elsewhere at the site. A total of 149 vessels were found, primarily jars and goblets. The findspots were in the courtyard, storage room, central room, and archive room.

=== Temple to Ninkarrak ===
Ninkarrak was the ancient goddess of healing. Her temple, with excavated occupation levels dated to roughly 1700 BC to 1600 BC, was identified based on a tablet with a list of offerings which starts with her name, and by seals mentioned the goddess. It was not affected by the fire that destroyed the House of Puzurum though it was only a narrow street away. In the house of barber Gimil-Ninkarrak which lay next door a number of intramural burials were found, adults and children. Thousands of beads made out of precious materials such as agate, carnelian, and lapis lazuli were found here. Archaeologists also found a number of small bronze figurines of dogs inside the temple as well. Dogs were the animals sacred to Ninkarrak. A ceremonial axe and a scimitar with a devotional inscription mentioning Ninkarrak, both bronze, were also found. Early occupation of the structure has been dated to roughly the same period as the reigns of three kings of Terqa. The earliest of them was Yadikh-abu, a contemporary of Samsuiluna of Babylon, defeated by the latter in 1721 BCE. Kashtiliash, and Shunuhru-ammu also ruled during this period. The temple was remodeled multiple times.

The Egyptian scarabs found in the temple of Ninkarrak represent the easternmost known example of such objects in a sealed deposit dated to the Old Babylonian period. They are attributed to around 1650-1640 BC, or the Fifteenth Dynasty of Egypt. The hieroglyphs inscribed on them are regarded as "poorly executed and sometimes misunderstood," indicating Levantine, rather than Egyptian, origin. Similar scarabs are also known from Byblos, Sidon and Ugarit.

=== Temple to Lagamal ===
Lagamal was a Mesopotamian deity primarily worshiped in Dilbat, but worship was also prominently practiced in Terqa as well as Susa. This was a deity associated with the underworld.

In the majority of known sources Lagamal is a male deity, but it was regarded as a goddess rather than a god in Terqa.

=== Icehouse ===
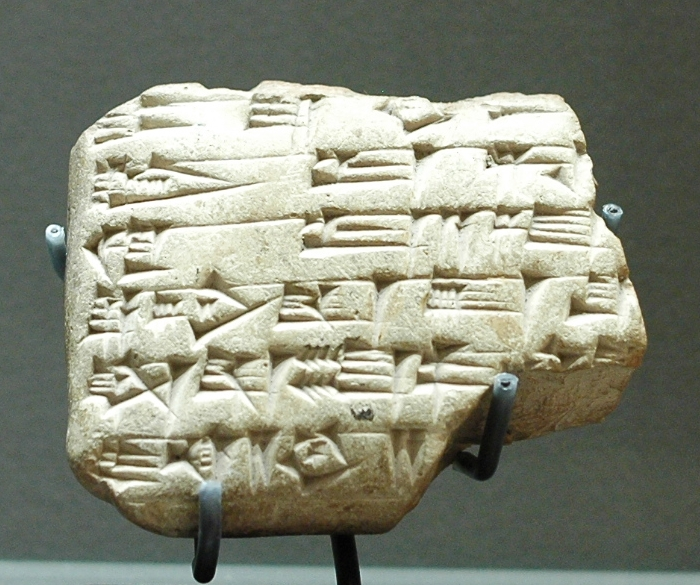
Tablet of Zimri-Lim, king of Mari, concerning the foundation of an ice-house in Terqa. Baked clay, ca. 1780 BC. Louvre Museum

The oldest attested ice house (building) in the world may have been built in Terqa. It is recorded in a cuneiform tablet from c. 1780 BC that Zimri-Lim, the King of Mari ordered such a construction in Terqa, "which never before had any king built."

=== Trade ===
Evidence of trade contacts with the Indus valley has been found here. Archaeologist Giorgio Buccellati found cloves, an important spice, in a burned-down house which was dated to 1720 BC.

"In the pantry of a house belonging to an individual named Puzurum, dated by tablets to c. 1700 BCE or slightly thereafter, were found 'a handful of cloves ... well preserved in a partly overturned jar of a medium size'."

Since this house was described as being of a medium size, it seems that, at that time, cloves were already accessible to the common people of Terqa.

Cloves are native to the Molucca Islands off the coast of Indonesia, and were extensively used in ancient India. This was the first evidence of cloves being used in the west before Roman times. The discovery was first reported in 1978.

=== Genetics ===
Skeltons found in a Early Bronze Age (c. 2650–2450 BC) stone tomb were found to have maternal (mtDNA) haplogroup K.

Classical era mitochondrial DNA from freshly unearthed 1st millennium BC to early 1st millennium AD (Roman period) remains (teeth) of 4 individuals origally deeply deposited in slightly alkaline soil of ancient Terqa and Tell Masaikh (ancient Kar-Assurnasirpal held in a museum, located on the Euphrates 5 kilometres (5,000 m) upstream from Terqa) was analysed in 2013. Dated to the period between 2.5 Kyrs BC and 0.5 Kyrs AD the studied individuals carried mtDNA haplotypes corresponding to the M4b1, M49 and M61 haplogroups, which are believed to have arisen in the area of the Indian subcontinent during the Upper Paleolithic and are absent in people living today in Syria. However, they are present in people inhabiting today's India, Pakistan, Tibet and Himalayas. A 2014 study expanding on the 2013 study and based on analysis of 15751 DNA samples arrives at the conclusion, that "M65a, M49 and/or M61 haplogroups carrying Roman period Mesopotamians might have been the merchants from India".

== See also ==
- Cities of the ancient Near East
- Saggarâtum
