= Ikšudum =

Mesopotamian god

- Deified ancestor
- Major cult center: Mari, Terqa

Ikšudum or Yakšudum was a Mesopotamian god worshiped in the kingdom of Mari, possibly a deified ancestor. He was closely associated with Lagamal. A possibly related deity is also listed among the hounds of Marduk in the god list An = Anum. Texts from Mari mention a ritual procession of Ikšudum and Lagamal. The pair was also invoked in oath formulas.

== Name and character ==
Ikšudum's name was spelled as ^{d}Ik-šu-du-um in cuneiform. A variant spelling attested in a text from Terqa is Yakšudum. Wilfred G. Lambert suggested it can be translated as "he seized". However, Karel van der Toorn instead translates it as "he has arrived", to be implicitly understood as "the god has arrived". Dietz Otto Edzard suggested Ikšudum might be a shortened form of a theophoric name (Ikšud + theonym), but according to Ichiro Nakata this is uncertain.( The name is also attested as an ordinary given name, not preceded by the "divine determinative", a cuneiform sign preceding theonyms, and on this basis it has been proposed that similarly to deities such as Itūr-Mēr, Yakrub-El and Ikūnum Ikšudum was a deified ancestor in origin. One individual bearing the name Ikšudum served as the governor of Puš during the reign of Amar-Sin.

Ikšudum was often paired with Lagamal, and together they could be invoked to settle disputes. For example, in a letter whose heading is not preserved an unnamed official implores king Zimri-Lim to send him this pair of deities, as well as trustworthy royal servants, to resolve a problem apparently involving grain.

=== In the god list An = Anum ===
A similarly named deity, ^{d}Ik-šu-du or ^{d}Ik-šu-da, occurs in the god list An = Anum (tablet II, line 273) as one of the four dogs of Marduk, the other three being Sukkulu ("thievish"), Ukkumu ("predatory") and Iltebu. Ichiro Nakata considers this to be a possible attestation of the Mariote Ikšudum. However, Wilfed G. Lambert noted that it would be implausible to view the latter as an underling of Marduk. In early scholarship attempts have been made to identify the four dogs as a representation of Io, Europa, Ganymede and Callisto, the Galilean moons of Jupiter, the planet associated with Marduk, but this view is no longer accepted in Assyriology, and the modern consensus is that the earliest possible reference to one of these celestial bodies being observed only occurs in a Chinese text dated to 364 BCE, attributed to the astronomer Gan De.

== Worship ==
Ikšudum was worshiped in Terqa in the kingdom of Mari. According to Dominique Charpin, it is possible that even though the city was associated with Dagan, Ikšudum and Lagamal might have been understood as its tutelary deities, analogously to how in Nippur Ninurta served as the city deity and was invoked in oaths, while Enlil, who was also associated with it, was more broadly the head of the pantheon. A legal text from Terqa dated to the reign of Zimri-Lim contains an oath sworn by Ikšudum and Lagamal. There is also evidence that the pair could travel in order to act as witnesses in similar contexts.

References to a possible festival procession of Ikšudum and Lagamal between Mari and Terqa are known. Analogous ceremonies are also attested for Dagan, Yakrub-El and Belet Nagar. Apparently the journey of Ikšudum between Terqa and Mari could only occur when the roads were safe. Kibri-Dagan, the local governor, in a letter explains that it required a peaceful atmosphere and an entourage of a hundred soldiers. Another document attributed to him describes the arrival of Ikšudum and his companion in Terqa. It has been suggested that the purpose of the celebrations was rainmaking, as a change in the weather is described in one of the letters mentioning it.
