= Belet-Šuḫnir and Belet-Terraban =

Pair of Mesopotamian goddesses

- Major cult center: Šuḫnir, Terraban, Ur, Eshnunna, Susa

Belet-Šuḫnir and Belet-Terraban were a pair of Mesopotamian goddesses best known from the archives of the Third Dynasty of Ur, but presumed to originate further north, possibility in the proximity of modern Kirkuk and ancient Eshnunna. Their names are usually assumed to be derived from cities where they were originally worshiped. Both in ancient sources, such as ritual texts, seal inscriptions and god lists, and in modern scholarship, they are typically treated as a pair. In addition to Ur and Eshnunna, both of them are also attested in texts from Susa in Elam. Their character remains poorly understood due to scarcity of sources, though it has been noted that the tone of many festivals dedicated to them was "lugubrious," which might point at an association with the underworld.

== Names ==
The names of Belet-Šuḫnir and Belet-Terraban, written conventionally as ^{d}Be-la-at-Šuḫ-nir and ^{d}Be-la-at-Dar-ra-ba-an, can be translated as, respectively, "lady of Šuḫnir" and "lady of Terraban." They are derived from the presumed cult centers of these goddesses whose precise location remains uncertain. In sources postdating the Ur III period, the first element could be represented logographically with the cuneiform sign NIN, though this alternate writing is only known from Eshnunna. Furthermore, the toponym Šuḫnir started to be written as Šuknir in later periods. According to Antonie Cavigneaux and Manfred Krebernik both of the discussed cities were likely located in the proximity of modern Kirkuk. They might have belonged to Simurrum. Douglas Frayne concluded that both cities were located next to each other on the road which lead from the intersection of Jebel Hamrin and the Diyala River to ancient Arrapḫa. He further suggests that Terraban might correspond to "Terqan opposite Gutium" known from Mesopotamian sources, and to modern Tawwuq. The city is attested already in Old Akkadian documents from Gasur (later Nuzi). In contrast, Šuḫnir is not well attested as a toponym in known sources. Markus Hilgert suggests that since its writing is not uniform, it might have originated in a language different from Sumerian or Akkadian. On this basis he concludes that seeking phonetically similar geographic terms is difficult. A less plausible proposal is that the name of Belet-Šuḫnir should instead be interpreted as "lady of the noble diadem" (Belet SUH.NIR).

== Character ==
In known sources, Belet-Šuḫnir and Belet-Terraban almost always appear together. This is well attested in the archives from the Ur III period, where only a handful of texts mention Belet-Šuḫnir on her own. In the texts of the Ur administration where the two are paired, Belet-Šuḫnir always precedes Belet-Terraban, though in inscriptions from two seals from Eshnunna (Tell Asmar) they are arranged in the opposite order. The reverse order is also present in an offering list from this city. They also occur one after another in the Weidner god list, where they precede Gazbaba, and in the Nippur god list. They are also commonly discussed together in modern publications, and share a single entry in the Reallexikon der Assyriologie und Vorderasiatischen Archäologie.

Available information about the nature of Belet-Šuḫnir and Belet-Terraban is scarce. The tone of festivals dedicated to them has been described as "lugubrious" by researchers. Examples include "place of disappearance" (níg-ki-zàḫ), a wailing ceremony (girranum) and the "festival of chains" (še-er-še-ru-um). Mark E. Cohen has proposed that they might have reflected a myth about their descent to the underworld, which involved them being restrained, but Tonia Sharlach notes that caution is necessary, as it is difficult to determine the individual character of deities only based on the names of festivals during which they were venerated.

== Worship ==
Belet-Šuḫnir and Belet-Terraban were worshiped in the court of the Third Dynasty of Ur. It is conventionally assumed that they were introduced to southern Mesopotamia due to a political marriage between a king of Ur and a princess from the north. Shulgi-simti, a wife of Shulgi, is commonly considered a plausible candidate for this role. However, according to Tonia Sharlach this proposal should be approached cautiously, even though many attestations of both goddesses are indeed tied to Shulgi-simti's religious activity. Geme-Sin, another wife of Shulgi, also made offerings to them on occasion. As of 2002, around seventy texts from the Puzrish-Dagan archives mentioning the pair were known. Sharlach states that this would place them far ahead of other foreign deities venerated in the royal court at the time, such as Allatum, Belet Nagar, Dagan, Ḫabūrītum or Šauška. However, she notes that whether they can be considered to belong to this category relies on the precise location of their cult centers. According to Douglas Frayne's proposal they would be located north of the border of the Ur state, but in a more recent publication Sharlach notes that since Eshnunna was a "core province," goddesses originating in its proximity were not necessarily understood as "foreign."

The royal worship of Belet-Šuḫnir and Belet-Terraban is best attested during the reign of Shulgi, with the first attestation coming from the twenty ninth year of his reign, but they still appear in documents connected to the subsequent kings, as late as during the second year of Ibbi-Sin's reign. Their popularity apparently diminished after Shulgi's death, and they seemingly were no longer worshiped in southern Mesopotamia after the fall of his dynasty. Most of the known texts indicate that they received offerings in Ur, with Nippur and Uruk mentioned less often in relation to them. A temple dedicated to both of them existed in the last of these cities. Babati, who was the brother of Abi-simti, a wife of Amar-Sin, was a temple administrator (sanga) of the pair. The existence of a guda_{4} priest (or priests) of both goddesses is also attested in a single document.

In documents pertaining to the activity of Shulgi-simti, Belet-Šuḫnir and Belet-Terraban typically appear alongside Annunitum and Ulmašītum, who both originated as warlike hypostases of Ishtar. In two texts dealing with distribution of sacrificial animals they are listed alongside Inanna of Uruk and the weather god Ishkur. In sources postdating the death of Shulgi-simti, they typically occur alongside deities associated with the underworld.

Both Belet-Šuḫnir and Belet-Terraban were also worshiped in Eshnunna. The former had a temple there. Šu-ilīya, a contemporary of Ibbi-Sin and Ishbi-Erra, called himself the "beloved" (na-ra-am) of both of these goddesses in a seal inscription in which he also invokes the local god Tishpak. It is assumed that they were major members of this city's pantheon in the Old Babylonian period. However, no attestations of Belet-Šuḫnir and Belet-Terraban from this city postdate the reign of Nur-ahum. They are mentioned in a document referring to the so-called "Great Offering" which was celebrated during particularly significant festivals. The only other deities mentioned are Tishpak, Inanna of Uruk, Sin, Adad, Belet Ekallim, a deity whose name starts with Bel- but is not fully preserved, and Ishtar ki-ti.

A certain Ammi-ištamar, an Amorite chief (ra-bi-a-an MAR.DU), dedicated an onyx vase to Belet-Šuḫnir at some point in the Old Baylonian period. Gianni Marchesi points out that he was apparently a Tidnean, and therefore likely resided in the east of Mesopotamia, as this term apparently designated an Amorite group dwelling in these areas in the Ur III period.

The pair continued to appear in god lists through the first millennium BCE.

=== In Susa ===
Belet-Terraban is also attested among the deities worshiped in Susa in Elam, though she only occurs in a single inscription from the reign of Puzur-Inšušinak, preserved on a statuette found during the excavations of the area referred to as the "Susa Acropole." It has been argued that this text might indicate that the Elamite ruler at some point controlled the Diyala area. Tonia Sharlach points out it is the only reference to this goddess predating the Ur III period.

According to Ran Zadok, the theonym ^{d}Šu-nir, known from texts from Susa, corresponds to Belet-Šuḫnir, and therefore she should be considered one of the Mesopotamian deities worshiped in the surrounding area, so-called Susiana, in the Old Akkadian period. Other well attested examples include Ilaba and Ningirsu. However, Piotr Steinkeller and Manfred Krebernik interpret ^{d}Šu-nir as a deified standard instead.
