= Belet Nagar =

Tutelary goddess of Nagar

- Tutelary goddess of Nagar
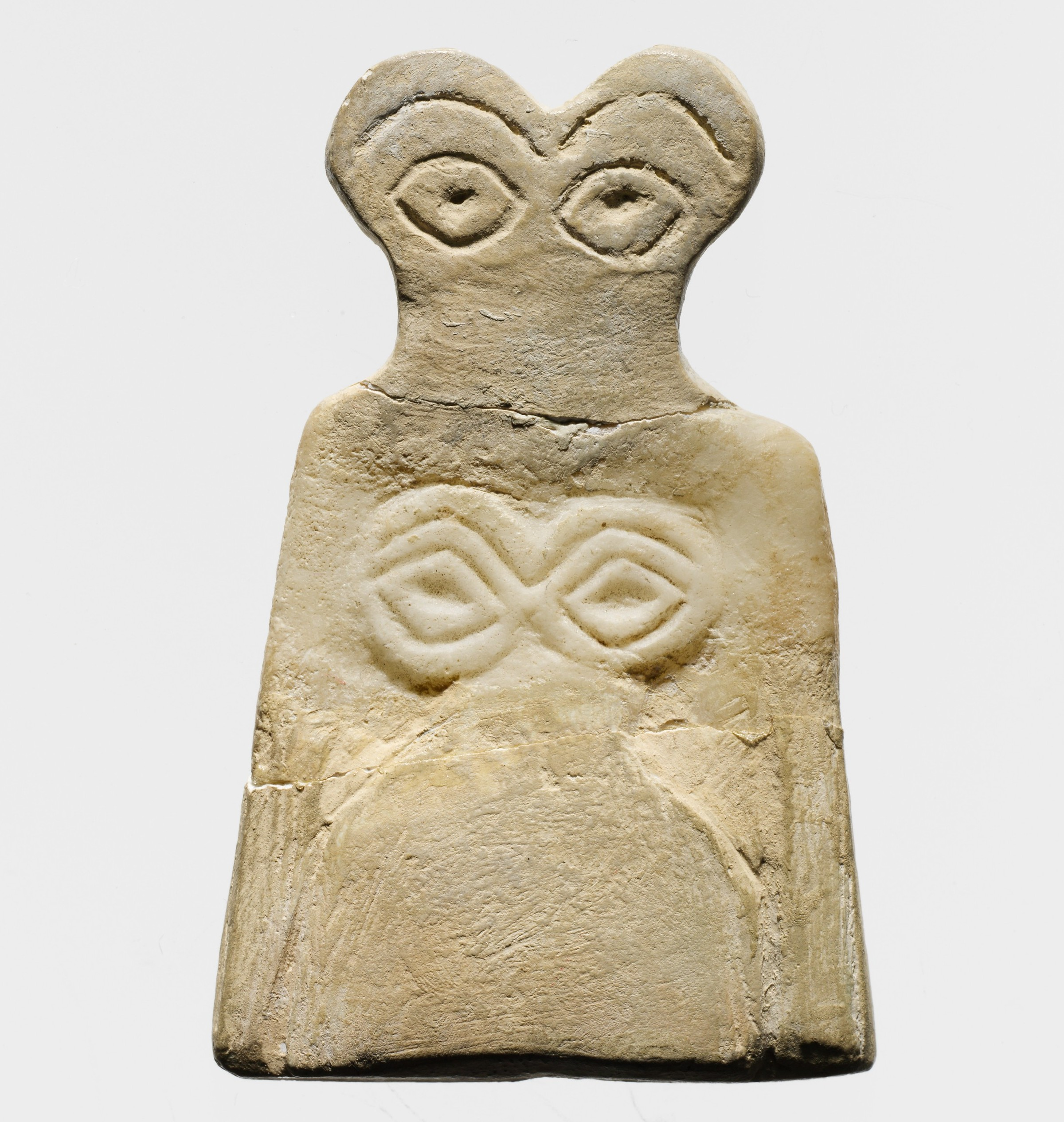
- A so-called "eye idol" from Tell Brak (ancient Nagar), possibly connected to a deity who was the forerunner of Belet Nagar.
- Major cult center: Nagar, Shekhna

Equivalents
- Hurrian: possibly Nabarbi

Belet Nagar ("Lady of Nagar") was the tutelary goddess of the ancient Syrian city Nagar (Tell Brak). She was also worshiped by the Hurrians and in Mesopotamia. She was connected with kingship, but much about her role in the religions of the ancient Near East remains uncertain.

== Character ==
Belet Nagar means "Lady of Nagar," and much like in the case of Ashur and its god, the name of the deity was the same as that of the corresponding city. Despite her status as one of the head deities of ancient Syria, much about her character and functions remains uncertain. It is assumed that she owed her position in the pantheon to the political importance of her cult center. While in the Old Babylonian period the political importance of Nagar declined, she remained a commonly worshiped deity.

In the second millennium BCE in Shekhna she was the tutelary goddess of the local dynasty. For example, in a letter from a certain Ea-Malik to Till-Abnu, ruler of a small kingdom in the Khabur Triangle centered around Shekhna, the former refers to Belet Nagar as the goddess to whose favor the latter owes his position as a king. Her role as a protector of kingship is also known from Mari. Another function fulfilled by Belet Nagar in Shekhna was that of a divine witness of commercial treaties. Beate Pongratz-Leisten proposes that her introduction in the areas under control of Third Dynasty of Ur was tied to these two roles. She points out that Nagar was not under the control of the Ur state itself, and it is therefore impossible to connect the introduction of its goddess to the pantheon of the southern cities to military conquests.

It has been proposed she was a mother goddess, though the sole piece of evidence for this theory is the fact that an Ur III period priest of Ninhursag bore the theophoric name Nawar-šen, Nawar possibly being a variant spelling of Nagar.

== Worship ==
While the city of Nagar is already attested in pre-Sargonic sources from Ebla and Mari, and in administrative tablets of the Sargonic administration, the oldest currently known attestation of Belet Nagar is an inscription of the Hurrian king Tish-Atal of Urkesh. In a curse formula of this ruler, she appears alongside Hurrian deities Lubadag (Nupatik), Šimige and Teshub, as well as the Mesopotamian Nergal, whose name might have served as a logographic representation of that belonging to a Hurrian deity, for example Kumarbi or Aštabi, though this possibility is disputed.

In Mesopotamia she appears for the first time in documents from the Ur III period, though it is unclear how large her role in Mesopotamian religion was. During the reign of Shulgi, Belet Nagar received offerings in Ur alongside Išḫara. They also had a joint temple in Uruk. The queen Shulgi-simti, one of Shulgi's wives, seemed to be a devotee of a number of foreign or minor deities, including Belet Nagar, Išḫara, Allatum, Annunitum, Nanaya, Belet-Šuḫnir and Belet-Terraban.

Many second millennium BCE texts from Mari and Shekhna (later Shubat Enlil, modern Tell Leilan) refer to Belet Nagar. King Zimri-Lim of Mari underwent a pilgrimage to her main sanctuary at one point in his reign.

There is a well documented tradition of cultic travels of the statue of Belet Nagar. A letter to king Till-Abnu alludes to a festival during which the goddess was believed to leave her main temple to visit a nearby town, seemingly so that new boundary markers could be set up. A letter from Mari refers to this celebration too, identifying the destination as Shehkhna/Shubat Enlil. Similar celebrations centered on deities such as Dagan and the pair Lagamal and Ikshudum are attested in the same region.

== Identification with other deities ==
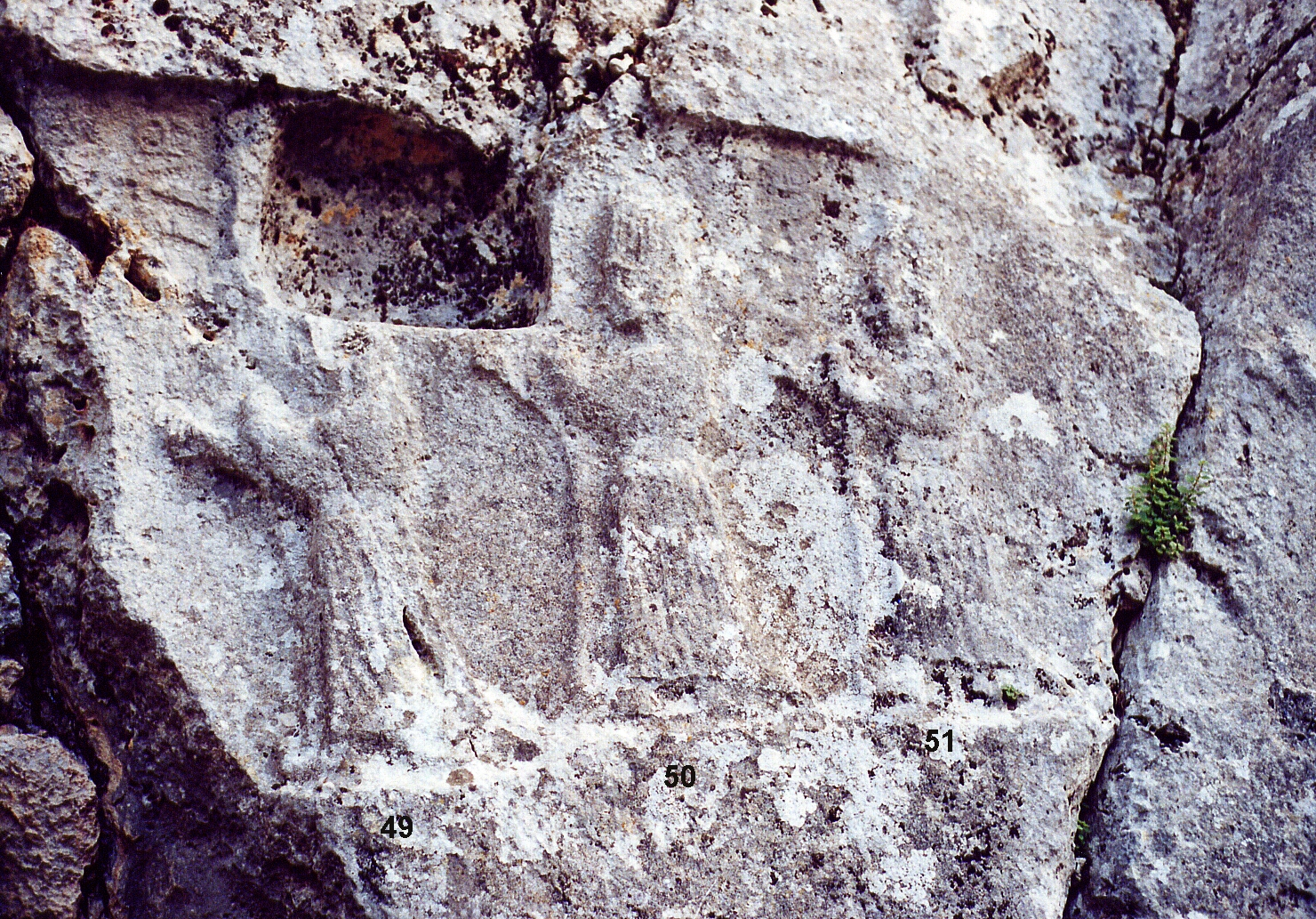
Nabarbi (first from the right) next to Išḫara and Allani on the Yazılıkaya reliefs

It has been proposed that ^{d}Na-wa-ar, a theophoric element known from personal names, should be understood as an alternate name of Belet Nagar.

Alfonso Archi assumes that Belet Nagar was identified with the Hurrian Nabarbi, though he thinks Nawar, the place name from which the latter name was derived, had to be a different place from Nagar. Piotr Taracha assumes that these two goddesses were one and the same, and as a result counts her among deities who were received by Hurrians from preexisting Syrian pantheons, unlike other researchers, who ascribe Hurrian origin to her. It has also been proposed that Nabarbi and Belet Nagar were both analogous to Ḫabūrītum, goddess of the river Khabur known from Mesopotamian sources from the Ur III period. One document directly refers to this goddess as "Inanna Ḫabūrītum," though this might be an instance of syncretism. Wilfred G. Lambert assumed that Ḫabūrītum and Išḫara were one and the same and should be understood as the spouse of Dagan, but this theory finds no support in more recent scholarship.

Daniel Schwemer argues that Belet Nagar (and other goddesses whose name was formed out of the word Belet and a place name) was an Ishtar-like figure ("Ishtar-gestalt"), possibly analogous to Shaushka. This view has been evaluated critically by Joan Goodnick Westenholz, who remarks that with the exception of their gender these deities do not appear to be similar to each other.

Piotr Steinkeller assumes that Belet Nagar was identical with Ninhursag, and assumes she was merely a name used to refer to the latter in Mari. However, Old Babylonian evidence from this city indicates that the logographic writing ^{d}NIN.HUR.SAG.GA was used to refer to Shalash, the wife of Dagan, associated with the cities of Tuttul and Bitin (located near Alalakh).

It has also been proposed that the deity worshiped in the so-called "eye temple," associated with figures known as "eye idols," which existed in Tell Brak in the Uruk period could be a forerunner of later Belet Nagar.
