= Lagamal =

Mesopotamian and Elamite deity

- Underworld deity
- Major cult center: Dilbat, Susa, Terqa
- Gender: male (in Dilbat); possibly female (in Terqa)
- Parents: Urash and Ninegal; possibly Dagan (in Terqa)

Lagamal or Lagamar (Akkadian: "no mercy") was a Mesopotamian deity associated chiefly with Dilbat (modern Tell al-Deylam). A female form of Lagamal was worshiped in Terqa on the Euphrates in Upper Mesopotamia. The male Lagamal was also at some point introduced to the pantheon of Susa in Elam.

Lagamal was regarded as an underworld deity, and in that capacity could be associated with Mesopotamian Nergal or Elamite Inshushinak. In Mesopotamian sources, his father was Urash, the tutelary god of Dilbat. In Susa, Lagamal formed a pair with Ishmekarab, a deity associated with law and justice, while documents from Mari indicate that in Terqa she was connected with the local god Ikšudum.

== Character ==
Lagamal's name means "no mercy" in Akkadian. According to Wilfred G. Lambert, grammatical analysis indicates it is a negated infinitive. Attested spellings include ^{d}La-ga-ma-al, ^{d}La-ga-mal, ^{d}La-qa-ma-al, ^{d}La-qa-mar, ^{d}La-ga-mar and ^{d}La-ga-ma-ru. The spellings ending with an r are exclusive to Neo-Assyrian sources. A further variant, ^{d}La-ga-mil, Lagamil, "merciless," is known from a single incantation from Der, a city whose scribal tradition is poorly documented. It has also been proposed that the name ^{d}Šu-nu-gi known from two seal inscriptions is a Sumerian translation of Lagamal. Lugal-šunugia (Akkadian: Bel-lagamal), "the merciless lord", who occurs in the god list An = Anum (tablet VI, line 70) without an explanatory note, might represent an etymologically related epithet.

Lagamal was associated with the underworld. Wouter Henkelman describes him as fulfilling the role of advocatus diaboli in the beliefs pertaining to judgment of souls in the afterlife documented in texts from Susa. The possibility that Lagamal served as an accuser in the judgment of the dead is also accepted by Manfred Krebernik.

Attempts were made to place Lagamal in the category of deities representing deified heroes or ancestors, to which Itūr-Mēr and Yakrub-El are often presumed to belong, but according to Jack M. Sasson similar as in the case of Latarak and Ilaba this assumption is incorrect.

=== Gender ===
In the majority of available sources Lagamal is treated a male deity. The only location where this name undisputably designated a goddess rather than a god was the upper Mesopotamian city of Terqa in modern Syria, as indicated by a text name is prefaced by a double determinative exclusive to feminine theonyms, resulting in the spelling ^{d.NIN}la-ga-ma-al. With regards to this, some Mari scholars, such as Durand and Sasson refer to Lagamal as a goddess in Terqa. Guichard however mentions that this determinative contradicts a theophoric name involving Lagamal, Lā-gamāl-abī, "Lagamal is my father" and also the Epic of Zimri-Lim which referred to Lagamal as the first son of Enlil. While earlier scholars on Elam such as Walther Hinz and König assumed Lagamal to be a goddess in Elam, this conclusion is regarded as incorrect by Wilfred G. Lambert and other researchers.

== Associations with other deities ==
Lagamal was regarded as the son of Urash, the tutelary god of Dilbat (not to be confused with the similarly named earth goddess). The relationship between them is confirmed by a passage from the god list An = Anum (tablet V, line 45). His mother was Ninegal. In a Neo-Babylonian god list from the temple of Nabu in Babylon Lagamal appears after Urash and Ninegal. In an incantation against field pests, Lagamal appears alongside Urash's sukkal (attendant deity) Ipte-bit.

The text AfK 2 and the god list An = Anum (tablet VI, line 8) equate Lagamal with Nergal.

In Susa Lagamal was associated with Ishmekarab and the underworld judge Inshushinak. Nathan Wasserman refers to Lagamal and Ishmekarab as a couple.

A late Assyrian copy of a Babylonian text refers to Lagamar as the "king of Mari" (LUGAL ša Mā-ri^{ki}), despite the deity being only rarely attested in documents from that city. Sources pertaining to travels of a statue of Lagamal from Terqa associate her with the god Ikšudum, whose name is possibly derived from the phrase "he seized". In An = Anum the same name refers to one of the dogs of Marduk, but it is regarded as implausible that the other Ikšudum should also be understood as a subordinate of the tutelary god of Babylon. Lagamal and Ikšudum appear together multiple times in other texts from Mari, seemingly traversing back and forth between Mari and Terqa. Durand suggests that Lagamal (who he views as a goddess) and Ikshudum were a couple. Guichard, who views Lagamal as a god, also suggests that Lagamal and Ikshudum were a couple, but also mentions that judging from the text relating to fashioning statues for both of them, it seems to imply that they have the same appearance and so they could also be twins. Charpin argues that the city gods of Terqa was the pair Lagamal and Ikshudum, whereas Dagan functioned as the lord of the entire region, in a similar fashion to Enlil and Ninurta for Nippur.

Lagamal was called the first-born son of Enlil in the Epic of Zimri-Lim, which Guichard suggests implies that Lagamal was the child of Dagan, and suggests that Lagamal's role in the epic was reminiscent of the traditional role of Ninurta. Guichard also connects a text inquiring whether or not to give the statues of Lagamal and Ikshudum lion heads was ideological influence from the character of Ninurta.

== Worship ==
The oldest attestation of worship of Lagamal is a seal inscription from the Sargonic period. Statues of this deity are attested in documents from Ur from the Ur III period. A temple dedicated to Lagamal was located in Dilbat, and displays of personal devotion, such as using the formula "servant of Lagamal," are common in documents from this location.

Terqa, located in modern Syria, was another city where the worship of this deity was widespread. A letter sent by Kibri-Dagan, the local governor, to the king of Mari records a cultic journey of a statues of Lagamal and another local god, Ikšudum, to Terqa, as well as sacrifices to both of these deities. Similar celebrations in honor of other deities, such as Dagan or Belet Nagar, are also known. Since the same letter mentions that it started to rain after the journey of the deities was completed, it has been proposed that its purpose was to influence the weather. A different letter from an unknown official requests the arrival of Lagamal and Ikšudum, while yet another states that these deities can only travel at a time of peace, and need to be accompanied by a hundred soldiers. A further document states that a verdict was pronounced by Kibri-Dagan and a "judge of the king" (dayyān šarrim) in front of Lagamal and Yakrub-El. An oracular inquiry from the Mari archives pertaining to the correct number of horns on Lagamal's crown is also known, with two, four and eight mentioned as possible answers. Two sealings from Tell al-Rimah indicate that a local ruler, Aškur-Addu, used a seal inscribed with Lagamal's name.

Theophoric names invoking Lagamal name are well attested in sources from Dilbat as early as in the Old Babylonian period, but were uncommon elsewhere in Mesopotamia, with the only known examples coming from Sippar (seven attestations, one of them likely referring to a man from Dilbat), Larsa (two attestations), Mari (three attestations, two of them likely referring to the same person) and Kisurra (a single attestation). One example of a name from Dilbat is Lagamal-gamil, "Lagamal is the one who spares". Objects which originally belonged to one man bearing it, a servant of the king Sumu-la-El, were also found during excavations in Tilmen Höyük in Turkey. It has been argued that names invoking Lagamal from cities other than Dilbat can be assumed to indicate emigration of its inhabitants to other parts to Mesopotamia, similar to Zababa names pointing at origin of the families of persons bearing them in Kish.

A late topographical text, composed no earlier than in the seventh century BCE, indicates that Lagamal was one of the many deities worshiped in the E-šarra temple complex in Assur. While it was dedicated to the god Ashur, as opposed to Enlil like its earlier namesake which was a part of the Ekur in Nippur, according to Andrew R. George it is possible that at least some of the shrines located in it were patterned on these which existed in the latter city, as evidenced by the presence of one dedicated to Ninimma among them. The reading of the name of the shrine dedicated to Lagamal, IM.ŠID-kurra, and by extension its meaning, are not fully certain.

=== Elamite reception ===
References to Lagamal have been identified in Elamite sources as well. He was introduced to Elam in the second millennium BCE. Like Adad, Shala, Pinikir, Manzat and Nahhunte, he was worshiped mostly in the western part of this area, in the proximity of Susa. One site associated particularly closely with him was Chogha Pahn West. Some of his temples were examples of so-called siyan husame, "temples in the grove", which possibly had funerary functions, though it has been pointed out that some of them belonged to deities with no such associations, such as Manzat or Simut. One of these structures, dedicated jointly to Lagamal and Inshushinak, was located in Bit Hulmi.

Multiple Elamite rulers mention structures dedicated to Lagamal in their inscriptions: Shilhak-Inshushinak according to his inscriptions restored a temple of Lagamal in Susa, as well as a siyan husame dedicated to him and Inshusinak at Chogha Pan West. He also mentions that he repaired one of such houses of worship and dedicated it anew to Lagamal and Inshushinak, addressed as his gods. Kutir-Nahhunte restored a hiel ("great gate") of Lagamal in Susa.

Theophoric names invoking Lagamal are known from Elamite sources. One has been identified in texts from Haft Tappeh, presumed to correspond to ancient Kabnak. Furthermore, an inscription of Shutruk-Nahhunte II, who reigned between 716 and 699 BCE, mentions an individual bearing the name Shilhana-hamru-Lagamal, likely the son of Shilhak-Inshushinak, the younger brother of Hutelutush-Inshushinak, and possibly an Elamite ruler in his own right, whose reign according to Daniel T. Potts should be dated to the early eleventh century BCE.

Ashurbanipal mentioned a statue of Lagamal among these he carried off from Susa as booty. It is presently unknown if he continued to be worshiped in Elam after that event.

== Later relevance ==
A well established theory connects the Elamite group of Inshushinak, Lagamal and Ishmekarab with the later Zoroastrian belief that after death souls are judged by Mithra, Sraosha and Rashnu. However, this view is not universally accepted, and it has been pointed out that while the names of both Sraosha and Ishmekarab are both etymologically connected to terms related to hearing, the functions of Rashnu and Lagamal in the respective traditions they belong to do not appear to be similar. Nathan Wasserman additionally questions if the three deities from Susa really did function as a triad in the same way as the Zoroastrian Yazatas, though he does accept that a close connection existed between Lagamal and Ishmekarab alone.

It has been proposed that the name of the biblical Elamite king Chedorlaomer, mentioned in Genesis 14:1–17, is a corrupted form of a hypothetical name in which Lagamal serves as a theophoric element. The possible original form of the name has been speculatively restored as Kudur-Lagamal or Kutir-Lagamal, with the first element meaning "protection" respectively in Akkadian or Elamite, but as early as in 1869 Theodor Nöldeke called the historicity of Chedorlaomer into question. No Elamite ruler bearing such a name has been identified in historical sources.
