= Ilaba =

Tutelary god of the kings of Akkad and Ḫana

- Tutelary god of the kings of the Akkadian Empire
- Major cult center: Akkad
- Weapon: mace

Equivalents
- Ugaritic: Ilib (disputed)

Ilaba was a Mesopotamian god. He is best attested as the tutelary deity of the kings of the Akkadian Empire, and functioned both as their personal god and as the city god of Akkad. Textual sources indicate he was a warlike deity, frequently described as armed with a mace. Whether he was understood as a fully independent deity or as a deified ancestor, as well as his proposed connection to the similarly named Ugaritic ancestral deity Ilib, remain a matter of dispute among researchers. He is not mentioned in any sources predating the reign of Sargon of Akkad. After the end of the Akkadian Empire, he continued to be worshiped in various cities in Mesopotamia, for example Mari, and in the Old Babylonian period he became the tutelary deity of the rulers of the Kingdom of Ḫana. He also continued to appear in literary texts describing the feats of Akkadian rulers and in god lists.

== Name and character ==
Ilaba's name was written in cuneiform as 𒀭𒀀𒂷 Ìl-a-ba_{4}, DINGIR.A.MAL. It is understood as a combination of the elements il, the generic word "god" or a distinct theonym, and aba, "father," attested in Semitic languages, and can be translated as "Il is the father" or "Il, the father." In the past Assyriologists were uncertain how to read it, and possibilities such as ^{d}A.MAL or ^{d}A.BA_{4} were proposed. Attempts were also made to identify the god meant as Zababa or Marduk. The correct reading has been first established in 1969 by Åke W. Sjöberg and found acceptance in Assyriology in subsequent decades.

Ilaba was the city god of Akkad. It is assumed that he functioned as a war deity. A mace is often mentioned in association with him. An inscription of Sargon known from an Old Babylonian copy states that Ilaba's weapon let him triumph over fifty other rulers. Another relays that Ilaba received his mace from the head of the pantheon, Enlil. In texts from the reign of Naram-Sin, he often appears alongside another warlike deity, Annunitum, who is designated as the one "leading the troops of the city of Ilaba" in one case. It has been argued that they were regarded as spouses, but this remains uncertain.

Manfred Krebernik notes that while it remains a matter of debate in scholarship if Ilaba was an individual deity or simply a generic term for a family god or a deified ancestor, the fact that his character is described consistently in known sources, his association with a specific city, and his presence in god lists seem to support the former view. Jack M. Sasson states that the view that he represented a deified ancestor, similar to deities such as Itūr-Mēr or Yakrub-El, is common in scholarship, though he considers it implausible himself. A connection between Ilaba and Ugaritic divine ancestral figure Ilib has been proposed by Wilfred G. Lambert. However, Dennis Pardee argues the character of Ilib cannot be considered identical with Ilaba's, and rules out the possibility that the former was derived from the latter. Krebernik notes that accepting that Ilib was derived from Ilaba would require assuming that the name of this god was translated after he was introduced into the Ugaritic pantheon.

== Worship ==
=== In the Sargonic period ===
Sargon of Akkad referred to Ilaba as his personal god. No evidence of the worship of Ilaba predates the period of this king's reign, including toponyms and theophoric names. One of his successors, Naram-Sin, referred to Ilaba as illat-śu, literally "his clan," perhaps to be understood metaphorically as "protector" or "family deity," though he called Enlil his personal god.

An inscription of Naram-Sin states that after extending his empire in the west he "smote the people whom the god Dagān had given to him for the first time, so that they perform service for the god Ilaba, his god." The mention of Dagan is typical for Sargonic inscriptions dealing with western conquests, as this god was believed to be responsible for bestowing kingship in the Upper Euphrates area, as also attested in later texts from Mari. It is not certain if the reference to the inhabitants of the northwestern territories having to serve Ilaba indicates that he was introduced to this area by the Sargonic dynasty, or if he was present in the local pantheon before already. The original of the discussed text was apparently inscribed on a monument located in Ur, but it is known to modern researchers from an Old Babylonian copy. A curse accompanying this inscription invokes Ilaba alongside a large number of other deities, such as Sin, Nergal, Ninkarrak, Ninhursag and Nisaba. Ilaba is also one of the five Mesopotamian deities mentioned in a treaty between Naram-Sin and an unknown ruler of Elam, the other four being Išḫara, Manzat, Ninkarrak and Ninurta. A text which is either a copy of an inscription of Naram-Sin or a later literary composition describing a rebellion against this king lists Ishtar, Ilaba, Shullat and Hanish, Shamash, and Umshu as the deities he reports the defeat of the rebels to.

A year name of Shar-Kali-Sharri states that he built a temple dedicated to Ilaba in Babylon before defeating a Gutian king named Sharlak. However, its ceremonial name is unknown. Andrew R. George argues that Ilaba shared it with Annunitum, but according to Paul-Alain Beaulieu, while the same year name mentions both of these deities, it commemorates the building of two separate temples. As of 2017, this year name remained the oldest known reference to the city of Babylon, in this case written as KÁ.DINGIR^{ki} (the first sign is read as babu in Akkadian, the second as ilu, the third is a determinative designating place names), a spelling also well attested in later times, seemingly reliant on a folk etymology reinterpreting the city's name as "gate of the gods." A temple of Ilaba might have also existed in Sippar, while an ereš-dingir priestess dedicated to him resided in Girsu. A reference to sanga clergy of Ilaba is known too.

Two texts from Susa mention offerings made to Ilaba and the deity ^{d}šu-nir, interpreted as a deified standard by Piotr Steinkeller and Manfred Krebernik, but as Bēlat-Šuhnir by Ran Zadok. Based on the content of the texts in mention, Steinkeller assumes the palatial administration of Susa was dedicated to Ilaba.

Ilaba is mentioned alongside Ishtar, Ninhursag and Ashgi in a letter of Adab sent by Ishkun-Dagan, who might have been an official residing in the Lagash area during the reign of Shar-Kali-Sharri, to a certain Puzur-Ishtar. The former pair of deities presumably represented the political center of the period, Akkad, while the latter two were the main deities Adab. Benjamin Foster notes that the style of this text is "unusual" and "flowery," and that it uses "language derived from magical formulae," which according to him might indicate its original intent was humorous, as its topic is a simple request to arrive quickly.

Various theophoric names invoking Ilaba are known from texts from the Sargonic period, including Ilaba-ālšu ("Ilaba is his city"), Ilaba-andul ("Ilaba is the protection"), Ilaba-ištakal ("Trust in Ilaba;" the name of one of Sargons's sons), Il-Ilaba ("Ilaba is the god"), Kašid-Ilaba ("Ilaba has come"), Rīssu-Ilaba ("Ilaba is his help") and Belī-Ilaba ("Ilaba is my lord"). Only a single possible toponym invoking him has been identified as of 2016, I-Dabal-Ilaba, though the reading of the name is not universally accepted.

=== Later periods ===
The Gutian ruler Erridupizir referred to Ilaba as illat-śu, similar as Naram-Sin.

Ilaba continued to be worshiped in later periods, as indicated by theophoric names invoking him, for example that of an ensi of Assur under the Third Dynasty of Ur, Ilaba-AN.DÙL. Many examples are known from Mari, where he appears in ten types of masculine theophoric names from an Old Babylonian period. They include Ana-Ilaba-taklāku ("I trust in Ilaba"), Idin-Ilaba ("Ilaba judged correctly"), Puzur-Ilaba ("under the protection of Ilaba") and Qīšti-Ilaba ("my gift of Ilaba"). An earlier attestation of Ilaba from this city is an offering list from the Šakkanakku period. An Old Babylonian seal from Me-Turan bears the name of a certain Puzur-Ilaba, son of Ilaba-nasir, who referred to himself as a servant of Naram-Sin of Eshnunna. A man bearing theophoric name invoking Ilaba, Ipqu-Ilaba, was the father of a certain Zikir-ilīšu, a servant of Nur-Adad of Larsa, and is known from an inscribed seal of his son.

Starting with the later part of the Old Babylonian period, rulers of the Kingdom of Ḫana came to worship Ilaba as their tutelary god. Multiple royal seals from this area are inscribed with a dedication to him and Dagan, though the formula varies, with known examples including "the beloved of Ilaba and Dagan," "ensi of Dagan and Ilaba," and "servant of Ilaba and Dagan."

A possible reference to Ilaba has been identified in an offering list from Emar, though the identity of the deity meant is uncertain in this case. Gary Beckman assumes the name is to be read as ^{d}A-ba in this case, and that it refers to a god of West Semitic origin. The Emariote deity is attested both in ritual texts and in theophoric names in the Emariote text corpus.

== Miscellaneous textual sources ==
The poorly preserved temple list from Khorsabad assigns the Edikumaḫ (Sumerian: "house of the exalted judge") to Ilaba, though its location is not preserved. According to Andrew R. George, most entries in this document appear to be otherwise unknown temples located in the north of Mesopotamia, for example in the Diyala area. Ilaba is also attested in various god lists, including the Nippur god list, An = Anum and the Weidner god list, where he appears after Zababa. Due to textual corruption, copies from Emar and Ugarit treat Ilaba and the deity DINGIR.A.BA_{4}.BA_{4} who follows him as goddesses and explain them as the Mesopotamian counterparts of Hurrian Hutena and Hutellura.

A fictitious letter attributed to Sargon in ancient Mesopotamian scholarship in which he summons his allies for a campaign against the city of Purushanda, located in Anatolia, implores them to respond to the call of Shamash, Ilaba, Zababa and Hanish, who urge them to partake. Another literary text, which deals with Naram-Sin's campaign against the city of Apishal, whose location is unknown, refers to Ilaba and Ishtar as the king's friends and mentions him and Zababa as the gods who accompany him during battles. A late Assyrian version of the so-called Cuthean Legend of Naram-Sin might mention Ilaba after Ishtar and before Zababa, Annunitum, the pair Shullat and Hanish and Shamash among the deities who were the target of the eponymous king's oracular inquiry before a battle.
