= Ḫabūrītum =

Goddess of the river Khabur

- Goddess of the river Khabur
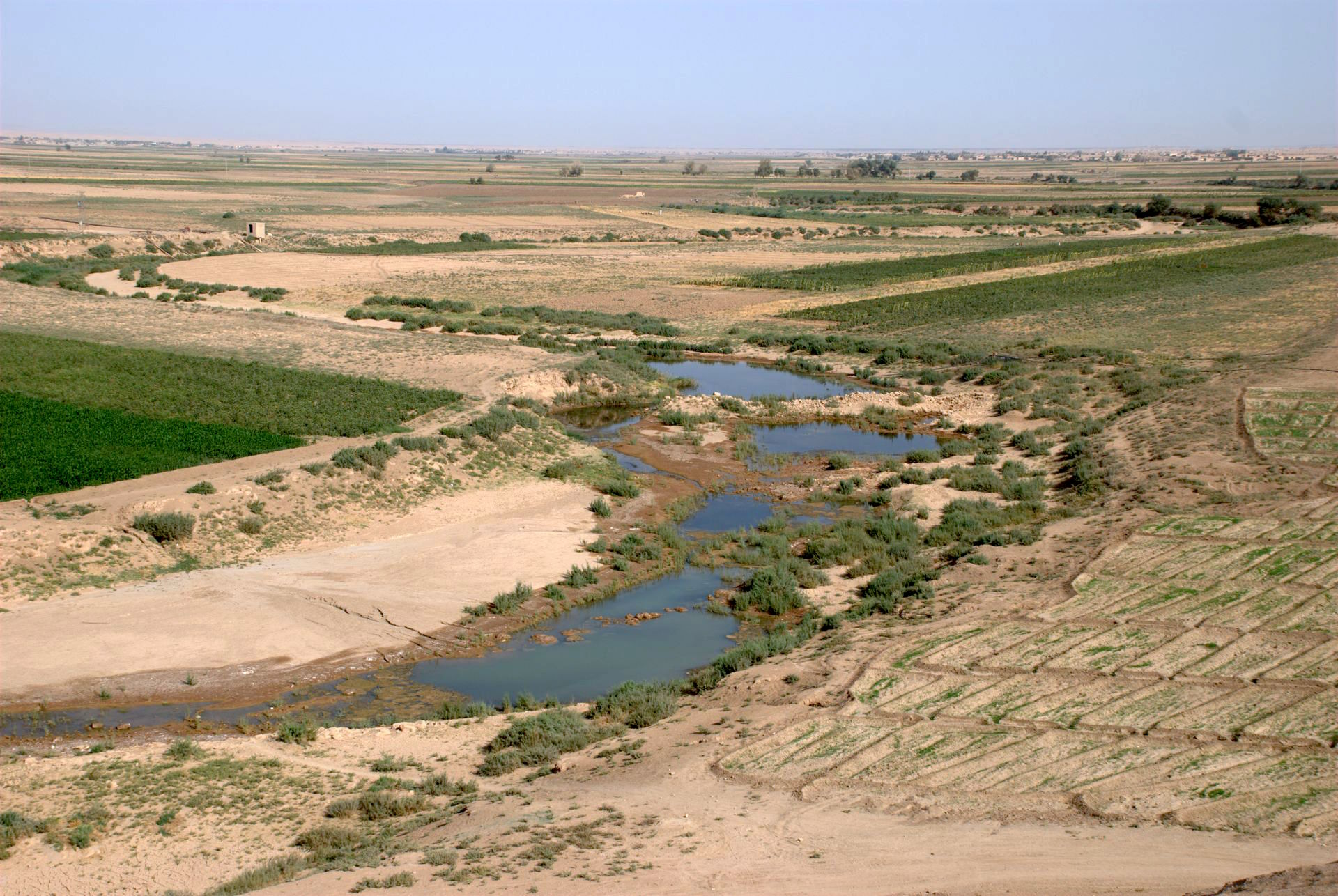
- A modern photo of the river Khabur in Syria.
- Major cult center: possibly Sikani

Ḫabūrītum (^{d}ḫa-bu-ri-tum) was a goddess of the river Khabur worshiped in ancient Syria. She was incorporated into the Mesopotamian pantheon in the Ur III period. Her original cult center was most likely Sikani, which in the early third millennium was located in an area ruled by Hurrians. Not much is known about her character. In Mesopotamian texts she appears chiefly in association with other deities worshiped in Syria, such as Dagan and Išḫara.

== Character ==
Tonia Sharlach notes that in the past, two possible explanations of the name Ḫabūrītum have been proposed: "the one from the Khabur river [region]" or "the one from [the city] Ḫabura." While individuals from the latter, most likely located in the proximity of modern Al-Hasakah, are attested in documents from the Ur III period, it is generally considered more likely that the goddess represented the river instead.

Nothing else is known about her character.

== Associations with other deities ==
In Mesopotamia Ḫabūrītum was associated with other deities of western origin, especially Dagan and Išḫara. Wilfred G. Lambert suggested that she should be outright identified with the latter, but this was subsequently proven to be implausible as in at least two documents they appear together as two distinct goddesses. In one case, Ḫabūrītum appears alongside Malkum, presumed to be an underworld deity, who might have originated in Syria like her. However, Tonia Sharlach notes that it is not impossible that he was a Mesopotamian deity in origin.

There is evidence that a degree of syncretism occurred between Ḫabūrītum and Inanna, as evidenced by occasional references to offerings made to "Inanna Ḫabūrītum."

Alfonso Archi proposes that Ḫabūrītum can be identified with Belet Nagar, the goddess of Tell Brak, and by extension possibly also with Hurrian Nabarbi ("she of Nawar").

== Worship ==
The cult center of Ḫabūrītum might have been Sikani (si-ga-an^{ki}), a city located in the proximity of the head of the river Khabur. It is attested in association with her in a document from the reign of Shu-Sin. It mentions a priest (sanga) of this goddess hailing from this settlement. Based on its assumed location, Tonia Sharlach argues that Ḫabūrītum was either a goddess belonging to the Hurrian pantheon or at least was worshiped in a "Hurrian-dominated" region.

In the Ur III period, Ḫabūrītum was introduced to lower Mesopotamia. Most of the evidence indicates offerings to her were made in the Nippur province of the kingdom of the Third Dynasty of Ur. Many other foreign deities entered the Mesopotamian pantheon at the same time, for example Allani, Šauška, Belet Nagar and Belet Dalatim. However, the exact circumstances of this phenomenon remain uncertain.

Documents from the Garšana archive from the indicate that Simat-Ištaran, a member of the royal family, performed an elūnum ceremony for Ḫabūrītum in Puzrish-Dagan during the reign of Amar-Sin. The same celebration dedicated to "Inanna-Ḫabūrītum" was held by Abi-simti in the same time period. One text records that she received various metal vessels meant to be used during it. The exact nature of the elūnum is presently unknown, but the name was applied in sources from the Ur III and Old Babylonian periods from various locations, including Ur, Umma, Mari and Tell Leilan, to celebrations related to many deities, for example Geshtinanna, Nergal, Nungal, Ishtar of Andarig and the pair Belet-Šuḫnir and Belet-Terraban.

Other texts also mention sacrifices made by Abī-simtī to Ḫabūrītum. One mentions that she sacrificed three fattened ewes, one for Ḫabūrītum, one for Dagan and one for Išḫara. Another mentions an offering of two ewes and one lamb alongside sacrifices to Dagan, Inanna, Ninniĝara and further deities whose names are not preserved. In yet another, a certain Sin-abušu, who served as a cup bearer, is designated as the "agent" responsible for a sacrifice of a fattened ewe to Ḫabūrītum and a lamb to Dagan. In one case, offerings to Ḫabūrītum are attested in Nippur in connection with a certain Lu-Nanna, a man from Zimudar.

A pair of deities representing the Khabur and possibly related to Ḫabūrītum, Ḫābūr and Ḫabūrtu, appear in a text listing the deities worshiped in Assur, conventionally referred to as the Divine Directory in Assyriological literature. It is assumed to date to the Neo-Assyrian period.
