= Ninniĝara =

Mesopotamian goddess

- Goddess of the niĝar
- Major cult center: Kullaba

Ninniĝara (also romanized as Ninnigar, Ninnigara and Ninnigarra) was a Mesopotamian goddess. She was associated with the niĝar, presumed to be a special part of certain temples dedicated to deities such as Ninisina and Inanna. It has also been proposed that she was associated with birth, healing, or both of these spheres. She is attested in sources from the Early Dynastic period, such as the Fara god list and the Zame Hymns. The latter indicate her cult center was Kullaba, a district of Uruk. She continued to be worshiped in the Ur III period. However, in the Old Babylonian period her name started to be used as an epithet of other deities rather than a distinct theonym.

== Name ==
Ninniĝara's name was written in cuneiform as ^{d}NIN.NÌGIN or ^{d}NIN.NÌGIN.ĝar-ra. Additionally, in two copies of the Zame Hymns the variants ^{d}nin-naĝar and ^{d}nin-SIG.E_{2} (according to Manfred Krebernik and Jan Lisman possibly a mistake for ^{d}nin-ŠU_{2}.UD.KID, to be read as ^{d}nin-NIĜIN_{3} or ^{d}nin-niĝar_{x}) occur. A gloss from a copy of the god list An = Anum indicates that the sign NIN might have been read as ereš or egi.

Despite phonetic similarity, Panigingarra's wife Ninpanigarra was most likely a distinct figure, and her name is unlikely to be a further variant of Ninniĝara's.

=== The term niĝar ===
The theonym Ninniĝara can be translated from Sumerian as "lady of the niĝar". It is assumed that this term designated a specific part of a temple. (Note: The interpretation of niĝar as a specific type of room might explain why in the Mari god list Ninniĝara occurs next to Ninnesaĝ, as the latter name was seemingly understood as "lady of the (gu)nesaĝ", a room used to perform libations in some Mesopotamian temples (for example the Ekišnugal in Ur).) It occurs as an epithet of the temple Ninisina in Isin in the Temple Hymns, and additionally in the names of three of temples dedicated to Inanna (in Akkad, Shuruppak and Zabalam). Martel Stol based on the occurrence of this term in a passage highlighting Ninisina's role as a divine midwife argues that the niĝar was associated with birth, and speculates the term might have been metaphorically understood as "womb". (Note: However, in one of the Temple Hymns, dedicated to Inanna of Ulmaš, the reference to the niĝar occurs before the goddess is described as a warlike figure.) Stol's interpretation is also supported by Grégoire Nicolet.

== Character ==
Based on the proposed association between the niĝar and birth, Grégoire Nicolet argues Ninniĝara was accordingly regarded as a goddess of birth. Antoine Cavigneaux and Manfred Krebernik instead propose that she was a healing deity, as she appears alongside Nintinugga in offering lists from Early Dynastic Fara and the Old Babylonian Isin god list, while an emesal lexical list and An = Anum (tablet V, line 135) equate her with goddesses such as Ninisina and Ninkarrak. Nicolet states that the two interpretations might both be correct, and points out Mesopotamian healing goddesses could be associated with midwifery. He additionally notes that in the Isin god list she appears between a section focused on healing goddesses and that listing servant deities who could be associated either with both Ninisina and Inanna (Ninshubur, Ninigizibara, Ninḫinuna) or with the latter goddess alone (for example Ninmeurur or Ninšenšena). He suggests that she might have been associated with Inanna, and that such a connection could reflect possible early assignment of maternal traits to the latter. However, as noted by Krebernik and Jan Lisman, Inanna was not regarded as a mother goddess.

== Worship ==
Ninniĝara is already attested in Early Dynastic texts from Fara. Grégoire Nicolet notes she appears in the proximity of two deities from the pantheon of Uruk (Ninirigal and Ningirima) in an early god list from this site, and on this basis assumes she might have originated in this city.

The penultimate of the Zame Hymns is dedicated to Ninniĝara. These texts have been discovered in Abu Salabikh, and it is presumed they are roughly contemporary with early texts from Fara, though more precise dating is not possible. Her cult center in this composition is Kullaba. In the late Uruk period this toponym referred to a separate settlement from Uruk, but at some point before the Early Dynastic period it became one of its districts. In addition to Ninniĝara, the hymn mentions three more deities, Utu, Ištaran and Nin-UM. According to Manfred Krebernik and Jan Lisman, this might constitute a reference to the presence of statues representing them in a temple dedicated to Ninniĝara.

An administrative text from the Ur III period mentions the offering of a fattened ewe to Ninniĝara on behalf of Abī-simtī alongside similar sacrifices made to Dagan, Inanna, Ḫabūrītum, and further deities whose names are not preserved. In the same period votive objects were dedicated to Ninniĝara by Kubātum, the wife of king Shu-Sin. Petr Charvát notes that this most likely reflects her high social position, as similar dedications were otherwise only made by kings and in one case by a princess.

The emesal form of Ninniĝara s name, Gašanniĝar, continued to appear in liturgical text through the Old Babylonian period and beyond, but it was reinterpreted as an epithet of other deities and was no longer written with the determinative designating it as a theonym.
