= Itūr-Mēr =

Tutelary god of Mari in ancient Mesopotamia

- Tutelary god of Mari
- Major cult center: Mari, later Terqa

Genealogy
- Spouse: possibly Tar’am-Mēr

Itūr-Mēr was a Mesopotamian god worshiped in the kingdom of Mari, and after its fall in the kingdom of Ḫana, especially in Terqa. His name is structured like a theophoric name rather than a typical theonym, which lead to the proposal that he was originally a deified hero or ancestral figure. An alternative theory considers him a hypostasis of the god Mēr, though unlike him he was not a weather deity.

The worship of Itūr-Mēr is best documented in sources from the reign of king Zimri-Lim, which include information about his temple, clergy and festivals. Based on available sources, it is assumed that in addition to serving as the tutelary god of the city of Mari he was also the divine protector of oaths, and could be invoked to heal the sick or to help with solving crimes.

== Origin ==
The name of Itūr-Mēr is structured like a theophoric name and can be translated as "(the god) Mēr has turned (to me)" or "Mēr has returned." The element Itūr- is attested in many Akkadian names, both from Mari and other locations, such as Itūr-Sin, Itūr-Addu and Itūr-Ea. Wilfred G. Lambert pointed out that similarly structured theonyms were common in Upper Mesopotamia and in various parts of Syria contemporarily with the Mari archives. Examples commonly recognized in scholarship include Yakrub-El and Tašqi-Mamma. Lambert also considered Ilaba (to be transcribed "Il-aba" according to his interpretation) a further example of such a name. However, according to Jack M. Sasson this view is incorrect, as are the occasional attempts to classify Lagamal and Latarak as similar deities.

Two main proposals regarding the original nature of Itūr-Mēr are present in scholarship: that he was a hypostasis of Mēr or a deified hero. Researchers supporting the latter view include Ichiro Nakata, Stephanie Dalley (who specifically sees him as a deified king) and Daniel Schwemer. A similar view has also been advanced by Jack M. Sasson, who argues that Itūr-Mēr and other similar deities represented a concept comparable to teraphim, and functioned as incarnations of deceased ancestral figures related to specific cities. Supporters of the former proposal, originally formulated by Dietz Otto Edzard and Herbert B. Huffmon, include Wilfred G. Lambert and Andrew R. George. According to Schwemer, an argument against identifying Itūr-Mēr and Mēr as two forms of one deity is the fact that the former was not a weather god.

== Character ==
Itūr-Mēr was one of the main gods of the local pantheon of Mari in the Old Babylonian period. He is particularly well attested in documents from the reign of Zimri-Lim (1775-1762 BCE). Daniel Schwemer suggests that he served as the ancestral deity of this ruler's dynasty. He could be referred to with the epithet "king of Mari" (lugal ma-ri^{ki}). The combination of the Sumerian word lugal and a city name was a standard form of names or epithets of tutelary deities of specific locations. Another attested epithet is "lord of expiation" (or "lord of absolution"), bēl pudîm. Nathan Wasserman compares the presence of Itūr-Mēr in texts from Mari to Babylonian propensity for Marduk, Assyrian for Ashur and to referencing Inshushinak in Akkadian texts from Susa, and considers all of them to belong to the same cultural milieu typical for the Old Babylonian period.

It is assumed that locally Itūr-Mēr was the second most important deity after Dagan, who was recognized as the supreme deity in the entire middle Euphrates area. A possible exception is a letter to Zimri-Lim from queen Šibtu, where Itūr-Mēr is third, and instead of him the sun god Shamash occupies the second position, right behind Dagan. These three gods are followed by Belet Ekallim and Addu (Adad). Jack M. Sasson has suggested that the deity Tar’am-Mēr, "beloved of Mēr," who appears alongside him in an offering list, was his spouse. According to Daniel Schwemer, no other attestations of this deity are presently known. The name Tar’am-Mēr belongs to the same category of theonyms as Itūr-Mēr.

Itūr-Mēr was commonly invoked in oaths, and functioned as their divine protector. This role is also attested for him in documents from the kingdom of Ḫana postdating the destruction of the city of Mari. A Mariote legal text mentions that a certain Pulsī-Addu from the land of Suhum had to swear an oath by Dagan, Itūr-Mēr, Ḫanat and king Zimri-Lim to guarantee that he will not try to pursue his claims in the future after losing in court. While oaths could be taken in the temple of Itūr-Mēr, sometimes due to distance the presence of his statue, emblem or another object associated with him was deemed sufficient.

A secondary, sparsely attested role of Itūr-Mēr was that of a healing deity. One letter to Zimri-Lim, sent by a certain Šu-nuḫra-Ḫalu, mentions that a boy from Aleppo was healed in Abbatum through this god's intervention.

Jack M. Sasson notes that two texts from Mari indicate that in some cases Itūr-Mēr was believed to be capable of helping with solving crimes. After the disappearance of two oxen, his statue was carried around the city, which supposedly lead to the discovery of their remains in one of the houses. In another case, it is said that he reclined over a city gate to determine if messengers from Babylon were responsible for the disappearance of a slave, and through unknown means showed the king that they were not guilty.

== Worship ==
Itūr-Mēr was the tutelary god of Mari, an ancient Mesopotamian city identified with the modern site of Tell Hariri in Syria, located close to the border with Iraq. He is first attested in documents from the šakkanakku period, roughly contemporary with the Third Dynasty of Ur. His importance outside Mari itself was minor. According to Ichiro Nakata it is possible he was initially worshiped in Idamaraz, and was later introduced to Suprum as well under either Yaggid-Lim or Yahdun-Lim. Multiple documents indicate that a temple dedicated to Itūr-Mēr existed in Mari. According to Cinzia Papi, depending on the interpretation of the so-called "Temple of the Lions" it is possible that a shrine dedicated to him has been excavated, though it has also been suggested that belonged to Dagan instead. Textual references to shrines might refer to locations within the royal palace, rather than to separate religious structures.

After conquering Mari, Shamshi-Adad dedicated a throne to Itūr-Mēr and in an accompanying inscription credited him for granting him the right to rule it. It has been noted that this text is unusual as it does not mention Dagan in any capacity, even though he was usually invoked in earlier periods by newly established rulers of western parts of Mesopotamia, and the local god instead occurs alongside Enlil and Ashur.

During the reign of Zimri-Lim, among the known members of clergy responsible for the rites of Itūr-Mēr were a šangû (a priest; attested in a letter of Addu-dūrī, the queen mother) and a muḫḫûm (translated as "prophet;" the single known holder of this office bore the name Ea-maṣi). Despite the existence of the latter, no prophetic messages attributed to Itūr-Mēr are known from the Mari corpus. Multiple references to laborers working in fields belonging to the temple of Itūr-Mēr are known too. They were presumably responsible for harvesting barley which in turn was supplied to the temple personnel.

The number of offerings to Itūr-Mēr mentioned in known documents indicates that he was one of the main deities of the pantheon of Mari. He was celebrated during a festival taking place on the twenty seventh day of the month Lilliātum in the local calendar. He received six sheep during it, the same number as other major deities, Addu, Annunitum, Belet Ekallim, Dagan, Ea, Nergal, Ninhursag (possibly to be understood as a stand-in for Dagan's wife Shalash in texts from Mari) and Shamash. Another document mentions the delivery of a small amount of gold to a certain Mukannišum so that he could fashion a necklace for Itūr-Mēr for a festival referred to as inūma zāmirī. Preparations of a palanquin are also mentioned in one of the administrative documents. It was apparently richly decorated, as the instructions mention that 6 pounds of gold were provided to fashion inlays including “1 Dagan figure, 1 royal figure, 1 Yakrub-El figure, 3 figures of mountain (gods), and diverse locals that face the chest; 2 uridu-genies and 2 lamassatum-genies; 1 middle mountain; 2 [...]. and 2 forelocks for the chest.”

Itūr-Mēr is well attested in theophoric names from Old Babylonian Mari. Examples include Ana-Itūr-Mēr-taklāku ("I trust in Itūr-Mēr"), Ḫatnī-Itūr-Mēr ("Itūr-Mēr is my male relative"), Ḫanna-Itūr-Mēr ("Itūr-Mēr is gracious"), Ipqu-Itūr-Mēr ("Itūr-Mēr is protection"), Itūr-Mēr-gamil ("Itūr-Mēr is merciful"), Itūr-Mēr-ḫīnāya ("Itūr-Mēr is the two eyes [possibly: of the country]"), Itūr-Mēr-šamaḫ ("Itūr-Mēr listens"), Itūr-Mēr-tillātī ("Itūr-Mēr is my ally"), and Itūr-Mēr-ḫiṣra (meaning unknown).

After Mari was destroyed by Hammurabi, Itūr-Mēr continued to be worshiped in the kingdom of Ḫana, whose main urban center was likely Terqa, through the rest of the Old Babylonian period. Since even during the reign of Zimri-Lim he was not worshiped in Terqa, Ichiro Nakata proposes that he might have been introduced there by former members of the Mariote administration who fled there after the city was sacked by Babylonians. Paul-Alain Beaulieu instead considers the presence of Itūr-Mēr in texts from Terqa to possibly indicate that Mari was not entirely abandoned in this period. Charpin especially uses the continued invocation of Itur-Mer in oaths from the kingdom of Hana to argue that Mari continued to function as a capital of the kingdom. Nakata additionally assumes that the disappearance of Yakrub-El from the local pantheon of Terqa was the result of introduction of Itūr-Mēr. One of the Ḫana texts mentions a house belonging to Itūr-Mēr, though he shared its nominal ownership with Dagan, Shamash and the local ruler, Išar-Lim. Kings of Ḫana continued to mention Itūr-Mēr in their documents as late as during the reign of Mitanni king Parattarna. A text from Ugarit that mentions “the great gods of the land of Mari” lists Addu, Dagan, and a third deity whose name is uncertain. One of the suggestions for the reading of the name is Utul-Miri (shepherd of the land of Mari) which could then possibly be a late interpretation of Itur-Mer.
