= Ninegal =

Mesopotamian goddess

- Goddess of palaces
- Other names: Belet Ekalli, Pentikalli
- Major cult center: Ur, Dilbat, Mari, Qatna

Genealogy
- Consort: Urash (in Mesopotamia); Teshub (in Hurrian sources)
- Children: possibly Nanaya and Lagamal

Equivalents
- Hittite: possibly Tešimi

Ninegal (also spelled Ninegalla) or Belat Ekalli (Belet-ekalli) was a Mesopotamian goddess associated with palaces. Both her Sumerian and Akkadian name mean "lady of the palace."

From Mesopotamia the worship of Ninegal spread to Elam in the east and to Syria and the Hittite Empire in the west. She was particularly venerated in Mari and Qatna, and due to her presence in the pantheon of ancient Syria she was also incorporated into Hurrian religion. The Hurrians transcribed her name as Pentikalli (Pendigalli).

Especially in literary works, Ninegal could function as an epithet of Inanna, and they could be also associated with each other in other contexts. However, it is now generally assumed that they were distinct deities in origin. Additionally, Ninegal could be associated with the goddess of prisons, Nungal.

== Character ==
While in the past it has been proposed that Ninegal was a form of Inanna in origin, or, as argued by Thorkild Jacobsen, that the name designated Inanna in a proposed hieros gamos ceremony, today it is considered more plausible that she originally developed as a distinct minor goddess, who served as the tutelary deity of palaces of kings and governors, and whose role was to guarantee their sovereignty. She only started to function as an epithet in literary works in the second and first millennia BCE. It has been pointed out that various cultic objects associated with Ninegal according to administrative texts, such as jewelry, are not identical with these dedicated to Inanna. The oldest source identifying Ninegal with Inanna might be a building inscription from the Isin-Larsa period which refers to her as a daughter of Sin. In god lists Ninegal usually appears near groupings of Inanna manifestations, though in the Nippur god list she and Ninsianna are placed together in a different section.

Belat Ekalli/Ninegal could be implored to act as an intermediary between a praying worshiper and her husband Urash, similar to other divine wives (Aya, Shala) in the case of their respective husbands or the attendant goddess Ninshubur in the case of Inanna.

== Worship ==
The oldest known attestation of Ninegal comes from a god list from Early Dynastic Tell Fara, in which she appears between two deities the reading of whose names is uncertain. Other early references include a dedicatory inscription of a servant of Nammaḫ-abzu, an ensi of Nippur, and a month name in the local calendar of Ur. During the reign of Gudea, Ninegal was worshiped in Lagash, where she had a temple. Evidence for popular devotion to her from that city includes two minor officials who referred to themselves as "servant (arad) of Ninegal."

Multiple attestations are known from the Ur III period, and it is assumed Ninegal was worshiped in all of the major cities of southern Mesopotamia at the time. There is evidence that the first kings of the Ur III dynasty, Ur-Namma and Shulgi, were active participants in the cult of Ninegal. She also appears in offering lists from Nippur and Puzrish-Dagan. A temple dedicated to her, Egalmah (Sumerian: "exalted palace"), possibly built by Ur-Namma, existed in Ur. It is possible that Warad-Sin later rebuilt it as a temple of the medicine goddess Ninisina. Another temple of Ninegal existed in Umma. In this city she was apparently closely associated with offerings for deceased ensis. Further evidence for worship of this goddess in the Ur III period is a detailed list of cultic paraphernalia dedicated to her from Eresh.

Her Akkadian name, Belet Ekalli, is attested for the first time in the Ur III period texts from Assur. She had a temple in this city, Ekinam (Sumerian: "house, place of destinies"), first mentioned in an inscription of Zariqum, a governor during the reign of Amar-Sin, who rebuilt it. In the Middle Assyrian period, it was repaired by Adad-Nirari I. A month named after her is mentioned in Old Assyrian texts from Kanesh.

It is unclear when Ninegal started to be worshiped in Dilbat, though it is possible she already belonged to the pantheon of this city in the Ur III period. Her temple in this city was Esapar (Sumerian: "house of the net"), possibly a part of E-ibbi-Anum, the temple of the local god Urash, rather than a fully separate building. However, in a document listing various temples Esapar is instead said to be the name of a temple of Nungal, with no location listed. As these two goddesses were associated, it is possible that there was only one Esapar.

Ninegal continued to be worshiped in the Old Babylonian period, especially in Ur and in Larsa, where a temple dedicated to her, E-a-ag-ga-kilib-ur-ur (Sumerian: "house which gathers all the instructions") was rebuilt by queen Simar-Eshtar, wife of Rim-Sîn I. She is however only sporadically mentioned in letters, compared to deities popular in the sphere of personal worship, such as Aya, Gula or Ishtar.

A late reference to Belet-Ekalli can be found in a letter from Babylon, in which a certain Mār-isar relays to the neo-Assyrian king Esarhaddon that a statue of Belet Ekallim meant for the Esagil temple complex was not yet finished.

Both the forms Ninegal and Belet Ekallim are attested in theophoric names.

=== Outside Mesopotamia ===
In the second millennium BCE the worship of Ninegal/Belet Ekallim spread from Mesopotamia to other areas in the ancient Near East. from the Hittite Empire in the west to Elam in the east.

Earliest attestations of Ninegal from outside Mesopotamia come from Mari, and indicate she might have been introduced to this city as early as in the Ur III period. It is possible that she was the tutelary deity of the ruling house in the Old Babylonian period. There is evidence that during Zimri-Lim's during some festivals she received the same number of sacrifices as the eight other most honored gods: the local tutelary god Itūr-Mēr, Dagan, Annunitum, Nergal, Shamash, Ea, Ninhursag and Addu. In a letter Zimri-Lim's wife Šibtu enumerated Dagan, Shamash, Itūr-Mēr, Belet Ekalli and Addu as "the allies for me" and the deities who "go by my lord's side." In offering lists she appears between Ninhursag and Ningal.

In addition to Mari, in Syria Belet Ekalli was also closely associated with Qatna, where the played the role of the city goddess. Some attestations are also known from Emar, where she was among the deities worshiped during the zukru festival. She is also attested in a god list, in which Belet Ekalli in the Akkadian column corresponds to ^{d}We_{e}-el-ti-ga-li in the Hurrian one.

According to Alfonso Archi, in Hurrian sources Ninegal was referred to as Pentikalli. The name is also sometimes transcribed as Pendigalli. Archi assumes that the Hurrians received her from Syria, and that her importance in Mari played a role in her spread. Marie-Claude Trémouille describes her as a goddess from the circle of Hebat from Halab (modern Aleppo). In Hurrian texts, she is designated as a concubine of Teshub. She was assimilated with Pithanu, described as a goddess who sits on Teshub's throne. The later name likely meant "daughter from Hanu," and should be understood as a sign of her association with the middle Euphrates area. Depictions of Pentikalli are mentioned in texts from Hattarina and Lawazantiya. She is also known from texts from Ugarit, where her name is spelled alphabetically as pdgl, and possibly appears in a personal name, annpdgl, theoretically reconstructed as Anani-Pendigalli. It has also been proposed that the Ugaritic goddess b'lt btm/nhtm, "lady of the house," was derived from Belet Ekalli.

A triad consisting of ^{d}NIN.E.GAL, Nergal and Ea is attested in economic texts from Susa. A dossier of texts dealing with the sale of sheep from the same city mentions a "scribe in the service of Ninegal." In Susa Ninegal also occurs in an inscription of Atta-hushu, written in Akkadian, though it has been proposed in this case the name might be a logogram representing Pinikir. Furthermore, a deity whose name was written logographically as ^{d}NIN.E.GAL was one of the many Mesopotamian and Elamite gods and goddesses worshiped at Chogha Zanbil, built by Untash-Napirisha.

While Volkert Haas assumed that Hittite references to ^{d}NIN.E.GAL can be understood as indication of presence of the Mesopotamian goddess in Anatolia, Piotr Taracha argues that the name was only a logographic representation of the goddess Tešimi, concubine of the Weather god of Nerik, in whose circle the presumed logogram occurs. In the treaty between Hittite king Šuppiluliuma I and Mitanni king Šattiwaza Ninegal appears after the couples Enlil and Ninlil and Anu and Antu in a list of "primeval gods" meant to serve as divine witnesses.

== Associations with other deities ==
It is presently uncertain which deities were worshiped with Ninegal in her earliest history. In a tradition originating in Dilbat, the local agricultural god Urash was regarded as her husband. In a god list from neo-Babylonian period they are followed by Lagamal, who was regarded as a son of Urash. In a ritual text, also from the neo-Babylonian period, Ninegal and Urash appear in a formula alongside Nanaya, a goddess referred to as "firstborn of the god Urash." A single inscription pairs Ninegal/Belet Ekalli with Amurru (^{d}MAR.TU). It is one of five similar Kassite period seals, which invoke either couples of deities (Marduk and Sarpanit, Ninurta and Gula) or individual deities (Ishtar or Marduk) to secure success and material wealth for the seal owner. According to Wilfred G. Lambert, unless an otherwise unknown tradition identified Amurru with Urash, he has nothing in common with Ninegal, making this specific inscription unusual.

According to the god list An = Anum, the sukkal (divine attendant) of Ninegal was the minor deity Dikum.

Wolfgang Heimpel proposes that in Mari, Ninegal was closely associated with Annunitum, possibly due to their shared connection with Inanna/Ishtar.

=== Ninegal as an epithet ===
The name Ninegal could function as an epithet of Inanna and other goddesses, sometimes impossible to identify. Examples of texts where the identification of Ninegal with Inanna explicit include the so-called Ninegalla hymn, in which the names occur in parallel.

In the Hymn to Nungal the eponymous goddess is apparently referred to as Ninegal. This association is also attested in a fragment of another, presently unidentified, hymn, and in two proverbs.

While the use of the name as an epithet was common in literary texts, the Shulgi hymns seem to be an exception, as they treat Ninegal as a distinct goddess.
