= Urash (god) =

Mesopotamian god

- Agricultural god
- Major cult center: Dilbat

Genealogy
- Parents: possibly Anu
- Consort: Ninegal
- Children: Nanaya, Lagamal

Equivalents
- Hittite: Šuwaliyat

Urash (Uraš) was a Mesopotamian god who was the tutelary deity of Dilbat. He was an agricultural god, and in that capacity he was frequently associated with Ninurta. His wife was the goddess Ninegal, while his children were the underworld deity Lagamal, who like him was associated with Dilbat, and the love goddess Nanaya.

Urash occasionally appears in myths, though they only survive in small, late fragments.

== Functions ==
Urash was the tutelary god of Dilbat, modern Tell al-Deylam in Iraq's Babil Governorate. His character was regarded as Ninurta-like, with an emphasis on the role of a farming deity, as evidenced by explanatory texts referring to him as "Ninurta of the hoe," "of the calendar" or "of the tenant farmer." In a late commentary (KAR 142), he is a member of a group labeled as "seven Ninurtas." Another late text describes him as "Marduk of planting."

== Associations with other deities ==
The god Urash worshiped in Dilbat was not the same as Urash, the spouse of Anu. Evidence for the worship of the latter is uncommon, and unlike the god of Dilbat she was chiefly a cosmogonic deity. A connection nonetheless existed between Anu and the male Urash, as exemplified by the reference to the former in the name of the latter's main temple, E-ibbi-Anum, and Wilfred G. Lambert assumes they were likely viewed as father and son.

Urash's wife was Ninegal, in Dilbat associated with Nungal. However, in the god list An = Anum (though not in any other sources) his spouse is instead Nin-uru, "lady of the city," perhaps to be identified with Belet-ali, whose name has the same meaning in Akkadian, though the latter name has also been interpreted as an epithet of the rainbow goddess Manzat, who was connected to the well-being of cities.

Deities regarded as his children include Nanaya, sometimes called his firstborn daughter, and Lagamal. A temple dedicated to Lagamal was located in Dilbat, and displays of personal devotion, such as using the formula "servant of Lagamal," are common in documents from this location. In a neo-Babylonian god list from the temple of Nabu in Babylon he appears right after Urash and Ninegal.

Urash's sukkal was Ipte-bit(am), whose name means "he opened the house." A deity bearing the name Ipte-bita also occurs as one of the two "Daughters of E-ibbi-Anum" in a late text, alongside Belet-Eanni. Based on the fact that analogous pairs of "Daughters of Esagil" and "Daughters of Ezida" are identified as members of courts of Sarpanit and of Nanaya respectively, specifically as their hairdressers, it has been proposed by Andrew R. George that these pairs of goddesses were imagined as maidservants in the household of the major deity or deities of a given temple.

In the Weidner and Nippur god lists Urash occurs in the proximity of deities such as Ninurta, Zababa, Ninegal and Lagamal.

In Hittite sources, the logogram ^{d}URAŠ designates the vegetation god Šuwaliyat, though his name could also be rendered as ^{d}NIN.URTA. By extension it could also designate the Hurrian Tashmishu, equated with him.

== Worship ==
Oldest attestations of Urash come from the Ur III period. His main temple was E-ibbi-Anum, "Anu has called it into being." Temple names labeling one deity as the creator of the temple of another are unusual, with only one more example attested in cuneiform texts, E-^{d}e-a-ba-ni ("house, Ea is its builder") whose location, as well as the deity it was dedicated to, remain unknown. He and his temple in Dilbat are mentioned in a year name of the Old Babylonian king Sabium. He is referenced in the prologue to the Code of Hammurabi as well.

One of the Kassite rulers bearing the name Kurigalzu left behind an inscription according to which he built E-ibbi-Anum, in which he addresses Urash as the "foremost lord" and "counselor of heaven and earth." It is presently difficult to determine why the king declared he built a new temple rather than repaired a preexisting one, as there is evidence Dilbat had a temple of Urash bearing the same name in the Old Babylonian period already. Haider Oraibi Almamori and Alexa Bartlemus assume that Kurigalzu I is more likely to be the ruler in mention than Kurigalzu II, based on similarities with his inscriptions from Nippur, where he built a new temple of Enlil, Ekurigibara.

Later rulers who left behind inscriptions pertaining to Urash's E-ibbi-Anum include Ashur-etil-ilani and Nebuchadnezzar II.

Urash was still worshiped in Dilbat in early Achaemenid times, though the inhabitants of the city lost any religiously motivated privileges (such as tax exemptions) they might have enjoyed earlier and one administrative document even mentions some of them were brought to former Elamite territory under Persian control as forced labourers.

In addition to Dilbat, Urash was also worshiped in Babylon, Kish, Sippar, Larsa, Assur, Nippur and Tell Egraineh.

== Mythology ==
A myth only known from a single poorly preserved tablet from Ur, Urash and Marduk, appears to describe how Marduk created plant life for Urash. It is possible that it was composed earlier, in the Old Babylonian or Kassite period, and that it had its origin in Dilbat.

In another late fragmentary myth, titled Enmesharra's Defeat by Wilfred G. Lambert, Urash is mentioned as one of the ten gods who received specific cities as their domains after Marduk's ascension to the throne of Anu.
