= Dilbat =

Archaeological site in Iraq

Coordinates: 32°17′44″N 44°27′58″E

- Location within Iraq
- Type: settlement
- Location: Babil Governorate, Iraq

Site notes
- Excavation dates: 1879, 1989, 2017-2023
- Archaeologists: Hormuzd Rassam, J. A. Armstrong, Maryam Omran, Haider Almamor
- Condition: Ruined
- Owner: Public
- Public access: Yes

Dilbat (modern Tell ed-Duleim or Tell al-Deylam) was an ancient Near Eastern city located 25 kilometers south of Babylon on the eastern bank of the Western Euphrates in modern-day Babil Governorate, Iraq. It lies 15 kilometers southeast of the ancient city of Borsippa. The site of Tell Muhattat (also Tell Mukhattat), 5 kilometers away, was earlier thought to be Dilbat. The ziggurat E-ibe-Anu, dedicated to Urash, a minor local deity distinct from the earth goddess Urash, was located in the center of the city and was mentioned in the Epic of Gilgamesh.

== History ==
Dilbat was founded during the Early Dynastic III period (middle 3rd Millennium BC). It is known to have been occupied, at least, during the Akkadian, Old Babylonian (after an occupation gap or several centuries), Late Kassite, Sasanian and Early Islamic periods. It is also known to have been involved in the various struggles of the middle 1st century BC involving the Neo-Babylonian, Neo-Assyrian, and Achaemenid interests. It was an early agricultural center cultivating einkorn wheat and producing reed products. It lay on the Arahtum canal.

An Old Babylonian period ruler of the city of Marad, roughly from the same time as Babylonian ruler Sumu-la-El was Alumbiumu. One of his year names was "Year Alumbiumu seized Dilbat".

== Archaeology ==
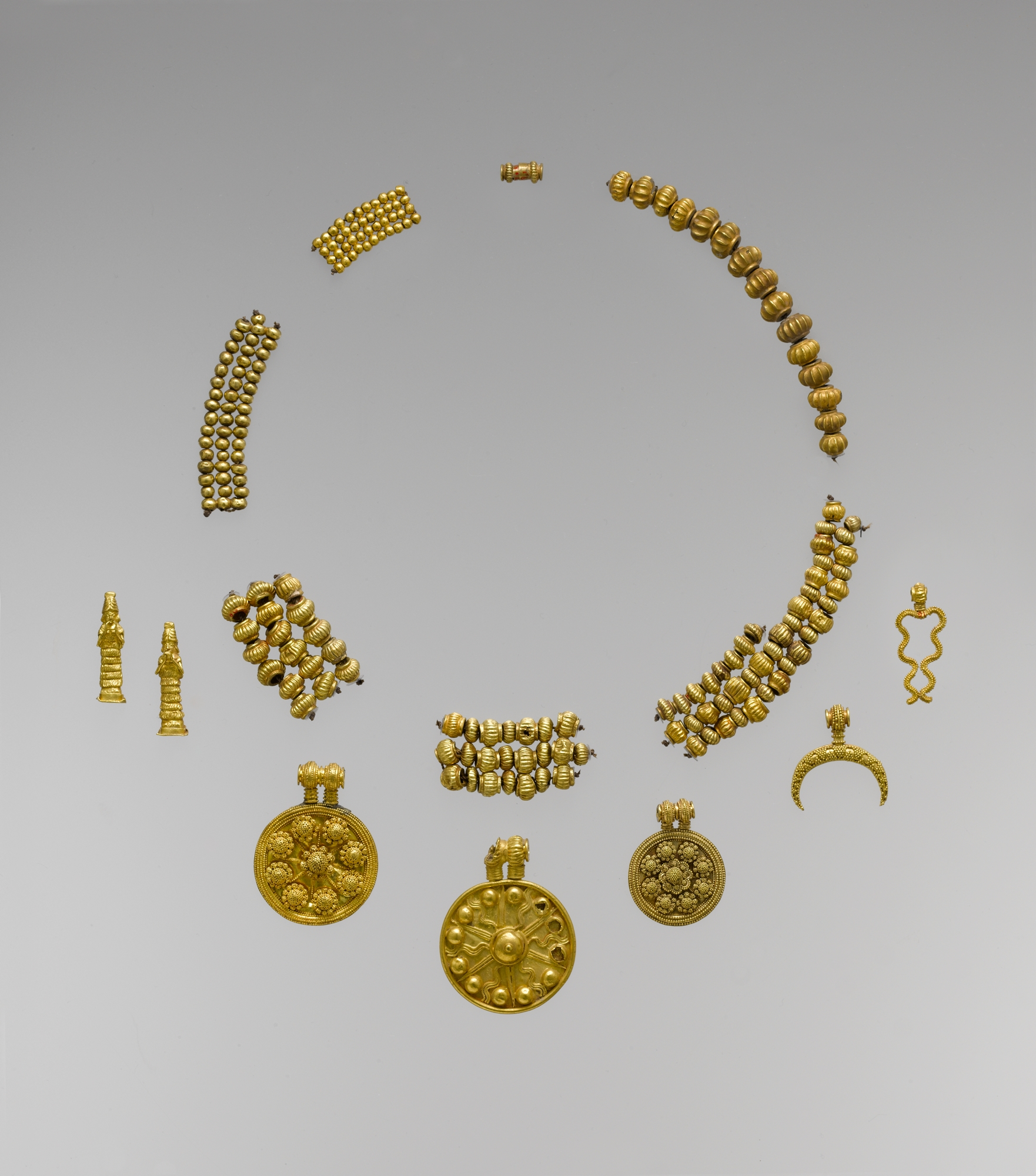
Dilbat hoard necklace

The site of Tell al-Deylam covers an area of about 15 hectares rising to a height of about 6.5 meters. The site is marked with robber pits, mainly at the northern end of the eastern mound. There is a Muslim shrine on the western edge of the site. It consists of two mounds, a small triangular western mound with 1st millennium BC and Early Islamic remains and a larger irregularly shaped east mound, roughly 500 meters in circumference, with remains from the 1st to 3rd millennium BC. In the 1850s a French team led by Jules Oppert visited the area and examined the nearby site of Tell Muhattat reporting that it consisted of the remains of a single large structure from the Parthian or Sassanian periods. Dilbat was excavated briefly in 1879 by Hormuzd Rassam (as Tel-Daillam), who recovered three minor cuneiform tablets at the site, mainly from the Neo-Babylonian period. Approximately 200 cuneiform texts from the Old Babylonian period were acquired by the Königliches Museum of Berlin from a dealer who represented them to be from Deylam and Muhattat; they were published in 1909.

The site was worked in 1989 by J. A. Armstrong of the Oriental Institute of Chicago beginning with a surface survey. Three sounding (A, B, and C) were opened. Soundings A and B revealed Old Babylonian period houses dug with later Kassite dynasty period pottery kilns. Sounding C showed Early Dynastic III and Akkadian period houses and burials. Two fragmentary cuneiform tablets were found and, in an Isin-Larsa context, an inscribed brick of Ur III ruler Amar-Sin.

Excavations, by the Department of Archaeology of the University of Babylon began in 2017 and extended at least until 2023. The first season wa led by Maryam Omran and the second by Haider Almamor. Work began on the eastern mound near the earlier Sounding C and a Kassite period temple to the city god was uncovered. The temple had inner and outer walls and multiple gates. In 2023 a magnetic gradiometry survey was conducted in the northwestern section of Tell al-Deylam. Ten inscribed bricks, found in situ, were of one of the two Kassite dynasty kings named Kurigalzu (Kurigalzu I, Kurigalzu II).

"For Uraš, foremost lord, counselor(?) of heaven and earth, his lord, Kurigalzu, the one called by the god An, who listens to Enlil, built the “E-Ibbi-Anum” (var. “E-ibi-Ana”), his beloved temple, in Dilbat."

Though Dilbat itself has only so far been lightly excavated by archaeologists, numerous tablets from there have made their way to the antiquities market over the years as the result of unauthorized digging.

== Tutelary god ==
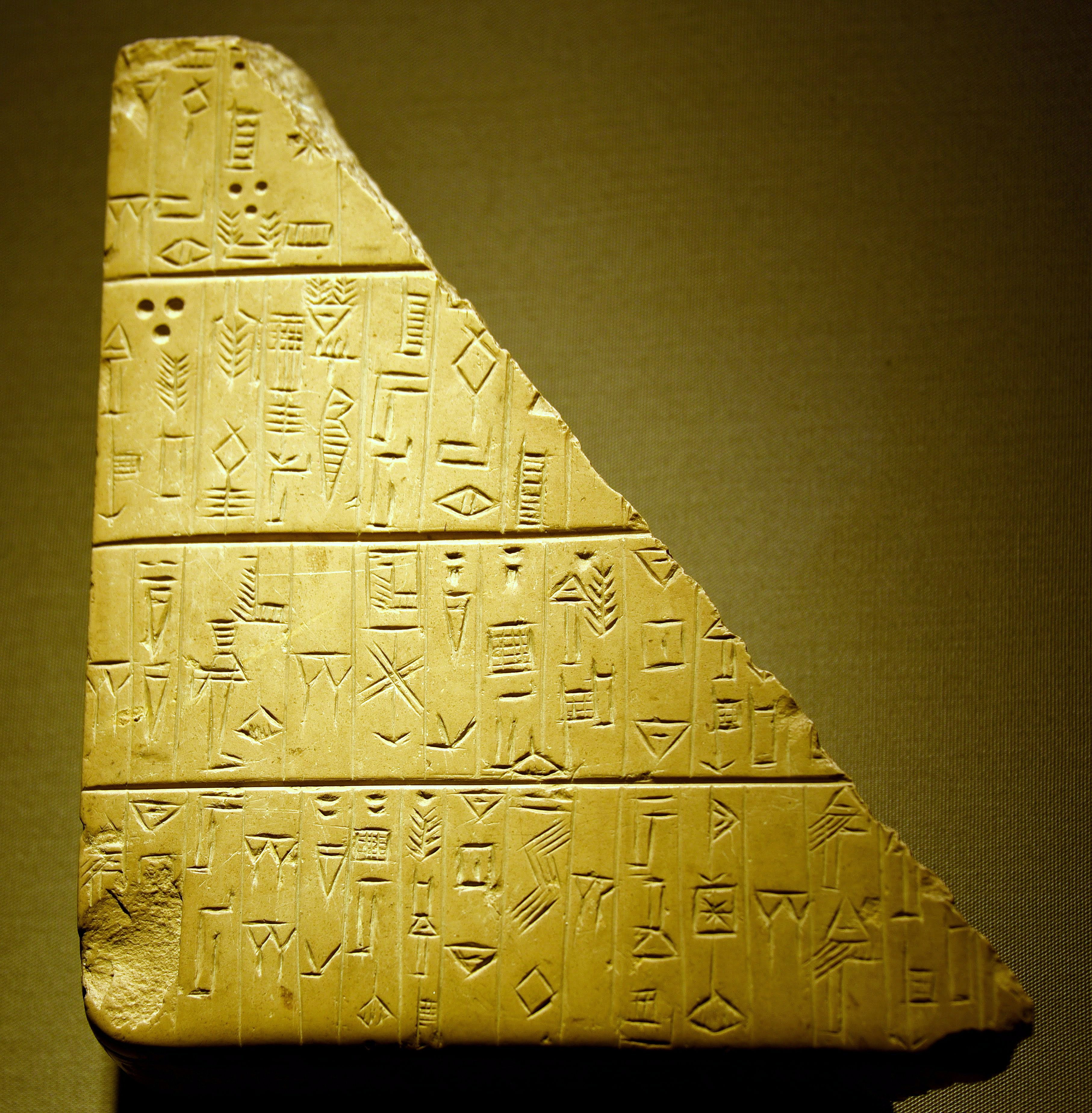
Stone tablet, land purchase, from Dilbat, Iraq. 2400-2200 BCE. Excavated by Hormuzd Rassam. British Museum

Dilbat, like many other Mesopotamian settlements had its own tutelary deity, Urash, a male deity distinct from the more well known goddess Urash associated with Anu. He was regarded as a farming god and a warrior, similar to Ninurta.

Urash was regarded as the father of Nanaya, a goddess of love from the entourage of Inanna, as well as the minor underworld deity Lagamal, worshiped in Susa as an attendant of Inshushinak moreso than in Mesopotamia. Urash was also the husband of Ninegal ("lady of the palace"), and they had a joint temple, as attested by an Assyrian account of its renovation undertaken on the orders of Ashur-etil-ilani.

One of the gates of Babylon, the one leading to Dilbat, was named after the god Urash. The ninth year name of Old Babylonian ruler Sabium reports the rebuilding of the Urash temple "Year (Sabium) restored the house / temple of Ibbi-Anum" (mu e2 i-bi2-a-nu-um mu-un-gibil). The Neo-Babylonian ruler Nebuchadnezzar II (605–562 BC) states in a text "I renovated the E’ibbi’Anum of Dilbat for my lord Uraš".

== See also ==
- Cities of the Ancient Near East
- Tell (archaeology)
