= Dagon =

Bronze Age god in ancient Syria

- God of Prosperity, Syrian Father of the gods
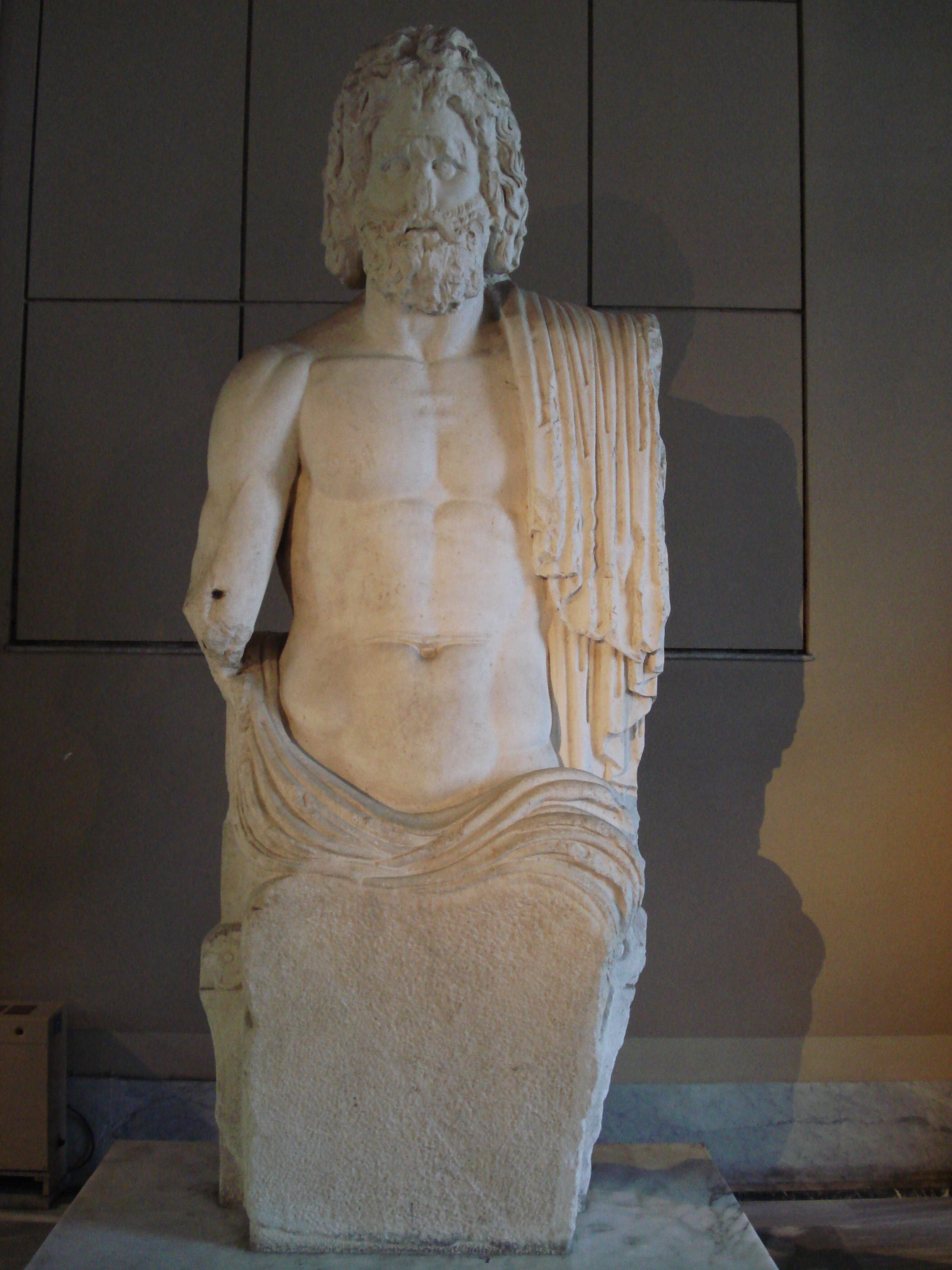
- Statue of Dagon/Marnas from Gaza portrayed in the style of Zeus. Roman period Dagon/Marnas was the chief divinity of Gaza (Istanbul Archaeology Museum).
- Major cult center: Tuttul, Terqa, Mari, Emar
- Planet: Saturn
- Symbol: Grain, fish

Genealogy
- Consort: Shalash
- Children: Hadad (Ugaritic Baal), possibly Hebat

Equivalents
- Mesopotamian: Enlil
- Hurrian: Kumarbi
- Ugaritic: El (tentative)

Dagon or Dagan (Sumerian: 𒀭𒁕𒃶, romanized: ^{d}da-gan; Phoenician: 𐤃𐤂𐤍, romanized: Dāgān) was a god worshipped in ancient Syria, across the middle of the Euphrates, with primary temples located in Tuttul and Terqa, though many attestations of his cult come from cities such as Mari and Emar as well. In settlements situated in the upper Euphrates area, he was regarded as the "father of gods" similar to Mesopotamian Enlil or Hurrian Kumarbi, as well as a lord of the land, a god of prosperity, and a source of royal legitimacy. A large number of theophoric names, both masculine and feminine, attests that he was a popular deity. He was also worshiped further east, in Mesopotamia, where many rulers regarded him as the god capable of granting them kingship over the western areas.

Attestation of Dagan from coastal areas are much less frequent and come mostly from the northern city of Ugarit, where Dagan's cult had a limited scope. According to the Hebrew Bible, Dagan was also the national god of the Philistines, with temples at Ashdod and Gaza, but there is no extrabiblical evidence confirming this. The extrasolar object designated Fomalhaut b is named after Dagon.

== Etymology ==
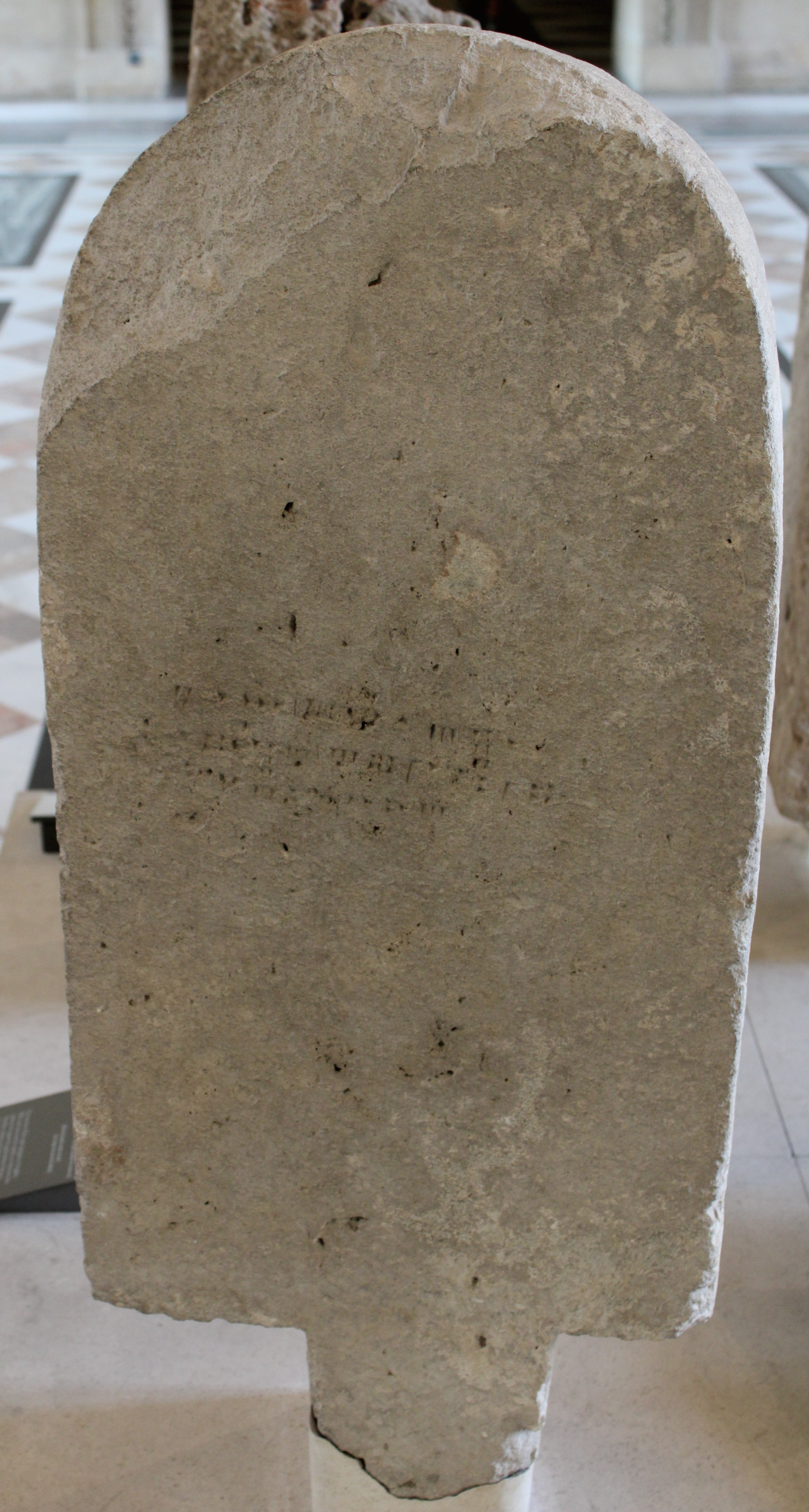
A Ugaritic stele detailing a sacrifice for Dagan, c. 13th century BCE

Multiple origins have been proposed for Dagan's name.

According to Philo of Byblos, the Phoenician author Sanchuniathon explained Dagon as a word for "grain" (siton). Historian Manfred Hutter considers it possible that the god's name derives from the root *dgn (to be cloudy), which he interprets as a sign that he was originally a weather god. However, the notion of Dagan being a weather god is rejected by most researchers of this deity (see the Dagan and weather gods section below).

Lluís Feliu in his monograph The God Dagan in Bronze Age Syria rejects both of these theories and concludes that Dagan's name originated in a pre-Semitic language spoken in inland Syria. This theory is supported by Alfonso Archi as well. Multiple other ancient Syrian deities are regarded as originating in such a substratum, including Aštabi, Ishara and Kubaba.

The association with a Hebrew word for "fish" (as in Hebrew: דג, Biblical Hebrew pronunciation: [/dɔːɣ/]) in medieval exegesis has led to an incorrect interpretation of Dagan as a water deity with fish-like features.

== Divine genealogy and syncretism ==
No known text deals with the parentage or creation of Dagan. His wife was Shalash; while well attested in Tuttul and elsewhere, she is seemingly absent in sources pertaining to Dagan's cult in Terqa. Their children were Hadad (analogous to Ugaritic Baal) and possibly Hebat, who is attested alongside Dagan and Shalash in a mourning ritual from ancient Aleppo. Daniel Schwemer considers it possible that Dagan, while always viewed as a "father of gods," only became the father of the weather god under Hurrian influence.

While Wilfred G. Lambert proposed in 1980 that Ishara was sometimes regarded as the wife of Dagan, and this theory is repeated as fact in older reference works such as Jeremy Black's and Anthony Green's Gods, Demons and Symbols of Ancient Mesopotamia, it is no longer considered the consensus. Lluís Feliu in his study of Dagan concludes that the association between these two deities was limited to sharing temples in Mesopotamia, and was most likely based on their origin in the western region and shared status as foreign deities in the eyes of Mesopotamian theologians. He also points out that there is no indication that they were closely connected outside of Babylonia, especially in parts of Syria where they were most commonly worshiped. He additionally remarks that Lambert mistakenly assumed Ishara is one and the same as Haburitum, goddess of the river Habur, who also appears in Mesopotamian texts in association with Dagan. Both Feliu and Alfonso Archi point out that Haburitum and Ishara could appear side by side in the same documents, and therefore cannot be two names of the same deity. Archi considers it more likely that Haburitum was analogous to Belet Nagar. Like Feliu, he considers it implausible that Dagan was ever regarded as Ishara's husband. He points out that the latter's character was similar to Ishtar's.

=== Dagan, Enlil and Kumarbi ===
In Mesopotamia, Dagan was equated with Enlil due to their shared role as "fathers of gods." This equation was eventually codified by the god list An = Anum, which additionally equated their spouses with each other. However, which of the two parts of this equation was viewed as the primary god varied. In Mari, it was Dagan who received Enlil's epithets, and in Emar the logographic writing ^{d}KUR, a shortened version of Enlil's epithet ^{d}Kur-gal (Great Mountain), stood for Dagan's name in the late Bronze Age. It is unclear if this equation was responsible for the logographic writing of the name of Emar's city god as ^{d}NIN.URTA, as the god of Emar is unlikely to be Dagan's primary son Hadad (whose name was written logographically as ^{d}IŠKUR), and in Hurrian sources from Syria ^{d}NIN.URTA is the war god Aštabi rather than a weather god.

In Hurrian tradition, Dagan was equated with Kumarbi, though only because of shared senior position in the respective pantheons. Kumarbi was nonetheless called "the Dagan of the Hurrians," and Shalash was viewed as his spouse due to this syncretic process. However, she is absent from Hurrian myths about Kumarbi.

=== Dagan and weather gods ===
Due to the similarity between the names of Dagan's wife Shalash and Shala, wife of Adad in Mesopotamia, some researches conclude that the two goddesses were the same and that Dagan was possibly a weather god himself. However, there is no clear proof that Dagan fulfilled such a function or that he was conflated with any weather gods.

=== Dagan and Nisaba ===
In some documents from Syrian cities, for example Halab and Ugarit, the logogram ^{d}NISABA designates Dagan. As noted by Alphonso Archi, in Western Semitic languages such as Ugaritic Dagan's name was homophonous with the word for grain (dgn in alphabetic Ugaritic texts), and the logographic writing of his name as ^{d}NISABA was likely a form of wordplay popular among scribes, relying on the fact that the name of Nisaba, the Mesopotamian goddess of writing, could simply be understood as "grain" too.

== Character ==
Dagan's character is difficult to study in comparison to that of gods who held a comparable position in Mesopotamia (such as Enlil or Marduk) due to the lack of mythical narratives or hymns about him and a comparatively small number of other document; nonetheless, researchers were able to determine some of his functions.

Sources from Emar, Aleppo and Mari attest that Dagan was an archetypal "father of gods" and a creator figure. This aspect of his character was likely exemplified by the epithet "lord of the offspring" connected to the zukru festival from Emar. His connection to funerary offerings was most likely an extension of his role as a divine ancestor, and modern theories regarding him as an underworld god are most likely erroneous.

One of Dagan's best documented functions was guaranteeing abundant harvests of grain. However, he was not an agricultural god but rather the source of prosperity in general.

In the 3rd millennium BCE, Tuttul Dagan was the god believed to bestow kingship upon rulers. He had a similar role in Mari. There is also some evidence that he could be invoked as a divine witness of oaths.

According to texts from Ebla, Dagan's attributes were a chariot and a mace.

== Worship ==
Dagan's primary cult centers were Tuttul, where his clergy was likely involved in the traditional form of governance, and Terqa (near Mari), where his temple E-kisiga ("the house, the silent place") was located. The worship of Dagan evidently spread over a large area from these cities, even though its principal centers were not a major political power in their own right, a situation which according to Alfonso Archi can be compared to that of Hadabal (a 3rd millennium BCE god of the upper Orontes valley) and Hadad of Halab. In addition to Tuttul and Terqa, settlements in which Dagan possessed a temple or shrine include Mari, Subatūm (located near Mari), Urah (on the left bank of the Euphrates), Hakkulân, Šaggarātum, Zarri-amnān, Dašrah, Ida-Maras (in the Habur triangle), Admatum (a village in the kingdom of Ašlakkā), as well as Emar and various difficult to locate villages in its proximity.

In Ebla, Dagan was usually referred to with titles such as "lord of Tuttul" (^{d}BAD Du-du-lu^{ki}) or "lord of the country" (^{d}BAD KALAM^{TIM}), but a phonetic spelling can be found in personal names. References to him as Bel Terqa – "Lord of Terqa" – are known from Eblaite sources too. Shalash was already regarded as his wife in this period. Representatives of the city of Nagar swore allegiance to the king of Ebla in the temple of Dagan in Tuttul, which was viewed as a neutral third party. While certain other gods known from the Eblaite texts, such as Hadabal and Kura, disappear from records after the fall of the city, Dagan's cult continued and retained its prestige.

In Mari, Dagan and Addu (Hadad) were protectors of the king and played a role in enthronement ceremony. Multiple kings of Mari regarded Dagan as the source of their authority. During the reign of Zimri-Lim, Dagan was one of the gods who received the most offerings during festivals, with other deities comparably celebrated in official offering lists including the local dynasty's tutelary deity Itūr-Mēr, Annunitum, Nergal, Shamash, Ea, Ninhursag, Addu (Hadad) and Belet Ekalli (Ninegal). In a letter Zimri-Lim's wife Šibtu enumerated Dagan, Shamash, Itūr-Mēr, Belet Ekalli and Addu as "the allies for me" and the deities who "go by my lord's side." The Terqa temple was closely associated with Zimri-Lim. A source from the period of his reign attests that to celebrate his coronation, a weapon was sent from Hadad's temple in Aleppo to Dagan's in Terqa, likely to legitimize his rule. It is possible that this ritual object represented the mace wielded by the weather god in his battle with the sea (analogous to the battle between Baal and Yam in the Ugaritic Baal cycle). Despite the close connection between the clergy of Dagan from Terqa and Zimri-Lim, he was viewed unfavorably by the population of Tuttul and the presence of his officials was in at least one case regarded as a disturbance of Dagan's rites.

In Emar, Dagan was the most senior god in offering lists, preceding the weather god (Baal/Hadad) and the city god, whose name was written logographically as NIN.URTA. An important celebration dedicated to him in this location was so-called erēb Dagan, "entry of Dagan." It took the form of a cultic journey of a statue, similar to celebrations of deities such as Lagamal or Belet Nagar attested in the same region. He was also celebrated during the zukru festival. Another festival dedicated to him known from documents from Emar was kissu, which most likely took place in Šatappi, a city possibly located further south. The precise meaning of the term kissu remains uncertain, making the nature of these celebrations, and roles of specific deities in them, difficult to ascertain. It has been proposed that the presence of underworld deities – Shuwala and Ugur – indicates that it represented the periodic death and return to life of a deity, possibly Dagan's spouse, but this remains speculative.

Ḫammu-rāpi, who, around 1400 BCE, ruled the area comprising the former independent Kingdom of Ḫana, used the title "governor of Ilaba and Dagan."

Due to the scarcity of sources, the later history of Dagan's cult remains unclear; however, it is evident that he was no longer the head god of the upper Euphrates area in later times. The head of the Aramean pantheon known from sources from the first millennium BCE was Hadad.

=== Mesopotamian reception ===
Mesopotamian rulers saw Dagan as the lord of the western lands (e.g., ancient Syria) and thanked him for enabling their conquests in that area. Inscriptions credit Dagan with granting Sargon of Akkad rule over the "Upper Land" and the cities of Ebla, Mari and Yarmuti in particular, as well as over areas as distant as the "cedar forest and silver mountains." To gain Dagan's favor, Sargon prayed to him in Tuttul. An inscription from the reign of Naram-Sin describes inhabitants of the western frontier of his empire "as far as (the city of) Ulišum" as "people whom the god Dagan had given to him."

In Mesopotamian sources, Dagan is sometimes regarded as equal in rank to the great city gods of Sumer and Akkad. One text uses the formula "Ishtar in Eanna, Enlil in Nippur, Dagan in Tuttul, Ninhursag in Kesh, Ea in Eridu."

In the Ur III period, marriages between rulers of Syrian and Mesopotamian politites likely contributed to the spread of the worship of Dagan, as well other western deities like Ishara and Haburitum, in the south of Mesopotamia. In Nippur, Dagan shared a temple with Ishara, first attested during the reign of Amar-Suen. Both deities were likely introduced from Mari and were linked only by their northwestern origin. Ishbi-Erra of Isin, assumed to be of Amorite origin and described by Ibbi-Sin of Ur as "man of Mari" and "traveling rubbish salesman of non-Sumerian origin" frequently mentioned Dagan in documents. Several of Ishbi-Erra's successors on the throne had theophoric names invoking Dagan, among them Iddin-Dagan and Ishme-Dagan. They were also involved in restoring his temples in Isin and in Ur. Some aspects of the syncretism between Dagan and Enlil seemingly can be attributed to this dynasty.

A few of the early Amorite kings of Assyria mention Dagan in their inscriptions, for example Shamshi-Adad I called himself "worshipper of Dagan" in a document describing the expansion of the god's temple in Terqa. Elsewhere he referred to himself as "beloved of Dagan." An inscription of his son Yasmah-Adad, however, refers to "Mullil [Enlil] (...) who dwells in Tuttul."

A šubtu (a type of shrine) of Dagan was located near Ka-ude-babbar, one of the gates of the Esagil temple complex in Babylon.

Itti-Marduk-balatu, a king from the Second Dynasty of Isin (middle Babylonian period), called himself Dagan's regent.

The stele of the 9th century BC Assyrian emperor Ashurnasirpal II refers to Ashurnasirpal as the favorite of Anu and of Dagan. This phrase might, however, be simply a literary relic.

==== Mythology ====
In the Mesopotamian god list, An = Anum, Dagan was placed in the circle of Enlil; this is similar to another western deity, Ishara. The same document equates him with Enlil and his wife Shalash with Ninlil.

There is some evidence that in Mesopotamia Dagan was connected with the poorly known tradition about conflict between the gods and Enmesharra, for example a passage stating that "with Dagan's authority [gods] have been guarding Enmešarra from time immemorial" is known; Dagan might however be a synonym of Enlil rather than a distinct deity in this context according to Wilfred G. Lambert.

The fragmentary myth Uraš and Marduk (here the male god from Dilbat, not the earth goddess) mentions Dagan, similarly most likely fully equated in this context with Enlil.

A legendary king of Purushanda who serves as an opponent of Sargon of Akkad in the epic King of Battle bears the name Nūr-Dagan.

=== Ugarit ===
Evidence from the coastal city of Ugarit is inconclusive. Whether a temple initially often identified as Dagan's was dedicated to him rather than El is a matter of scholarly debate.

In lists of gods and offerings from Ugarit, Dagan sometimes follows El but precedes Baal. Two such examples are known, but in six Dagan follows El and Baal. An incantation against snakebite mentions Dagan alongside Baal, while El is paired with Horon.

Dagan appears in six theophoric names known from Ugarit, and possibly in a seventh under the logographic spelling ^{d}KUR; for comparison Baal appears in 201, with further 36 using the form Haddu. For comparison, in known documents from Mari Hadad appears in 159 names, while Dagan in 138. However, only 17% of known names from Ugarit are theophoric, which makes it difficult to tell how representative are they when it comes to estimating the popularity of some deities. Additionally, many gods prominent in texts from Ugarit, including Anat, are uncommon in personal names, while the Mesopotamian god Ea (under a phonetic spelling of the name, which makes it impossible he was a logographic stand-in for local god Kothar-wa-Khasis) appeared frequently in them.

==== Dagan, El, and Baal's parentage ====
Dagan plays no active role in Ugaritic myths (such as the Baal cycle), though Baal is frequently referred to as his "son" or "lineage." In the poem Marriage of Nikkal and Yarikh he is referred to as "Dagan of Tuttul," possibly indicating that he was viewed as a foreign god by Ugaritic scribes.

It has been argued by Joseph Fontenrose in an article from 1957 that, whatever their deep origins, at Ugarit, Dagan was sometimes identified with El, explaining why Dagan, who possibly had an important temple at Ugarit is so neglected in the Ras Shamra mythological texts, where he is merely the father of Baal, but Anat, El's daughter, is Baal's sister, and why no temple of El has appeared at Ugarit. More recent research shows that evidence for identification of Dagan with El is at best indirect. In god lists El was equated with Hurrian Kumarbi and Mesopotamian Enlil rather than directly with Dagan. Alfonso Archi notes in some texts both appear separately, but also that Dagan was extraneous to the theology of Ugarit.

Other recent studies provide various other approaches to the problem of Baal's parentage in mythical texts. Daniel Schwemer proposes that the epithet "Son of Dagan" applied to Baal in Ugaritic texts was influenced by Syrian and Hurrian tradition. Noga Ayali-Darshan states that the portrayal of the relationship between El and Baal in the Baal cycle is similar to that between Kumarbi and Teshub in the Kumarbi cycle, and that in the Hellenized Phoenician tradition recorded by Philo of Byblos Demarous (Baal) has both a biological father ("Ouranos") and a step-father (Dagon) - both of them distinct from Elos (El; in this Phoenician myth a brother of Dagon). She also notes that due to the circumstances of his birth, Teshub had two fathers: one opposing him and one who supported his rise to power. She suggests that therefore it is not necessarily contradictory that two separate gods were regarded as Baal's fathers, though she assumes both in Ugarit and in Phoenician beliefs Dagan/Dagon was merely an element introduced from the culture of inland Syria and played no significant role himself. Aaron Tugendhaft considers Baal an outsider who is not a member of the family of El and Athirat in the beginning of the narrative and thus not their son by birth, but merely a brother of their children in the sense known from Bronze Age diplomatic texts. He argues that much as allied kings referred to each other as "brothers", so did the gods in Ugaritic myths.

=== Iron Age Phoenicia ===
The Phoenician inscription on the sarcophagus of King Eshmunʿazar of Sidon (5th century BC) relates: "Furthermore, the Lord of Kings gave us Dor and Joppa, the mighty lands of Dagon, which are in the Plain of Sharon, in accordance with the important deeds which I did." However, said king built no temples dedicated to Dagon in his city, and this god appears only in an insignificant role in the treaty between Esarhaddon and king Baal I of Tyre. It is therefore doubtful if he was prominent in Phoenician religion.

== Later relevance ==
According to Philo of Byblos, Sanchuniathon reportedly made Dagon the brother of Cronus, both sons of the Sky (Uranus) and Earth (Gaia), but not Hadad's biological father. Hadad (Demarus) was begotten by "Sky" on a concubine before Sky was castrated by his son Ēl, whereupon the pregnant concubine was given to Dagon. Accordingly, Dagon in this version is Hadad's half-brother and stepfather. The Byzantine Etymologicon Magnum lists Dagon as the "Phoenician Cronus."

The first-century Jewish historian Josephus mentions a place named Dagon above Jericho. It has however been argued that some of the locations possibly named after Dagon were in reality named after the Canaanite word for grain.

=== Jewish and Christian scriptures ===
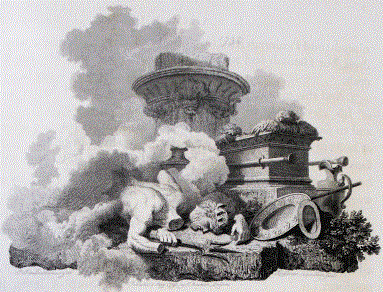
Depiction of the destruction of Dagon by Philip James de Loutherbourg, 1793.

In the Hebrew Bible, Dagon is referenced three times as the head god of the Philistines; however, there are no references to Dagon as a Canaanite god. According to the Bible, his temples were located at Beth-dagon in the territory of the tribe of Asher (Joshua 19.27), and in Gaza (see Judges 16.23, which tells soon after how the temple is destroyed by Samson as his last act). Another temple, located in Ashdod, was mentioned in 1 Samuel 5:2–7 and again as late as 1 Maccabees 10.83 and 11.4. King Saul's head was displayed in a temple of Dagon after his death (1 Chronicles 10:8–10). There was also a second place known as Beth-Dagon in Judah (Joshua 15.41).

The account in 1 Samuel 5.2–7 relates how the Ark of the Covenant was captured by the Philistines and taken to Dagon's temple in Ashdod. The following morning the Ashdodites found the image of Dagon lying prostrate before the ark. They set the image upright, but again on the morning of the following day they found it prostrate before the ark, but this time with head and hands severed, lying on the miptān translated as "threshold" or "podium". The account continues with the puzzling words raq dāgōn nišʾar ʿālāyw, which means literally "only Dagon was left to him." (The Septuagint, Peshitta, and Targums render "Dagon" here as "trunk of Dagon" or "body of Dagon", presumably referring to the lower part of his image.

Dagon is also mentioned in the First Book of Ethiopian Maccabees (12:12), which was composed sometime in the 4th century AD.

==== Fish-god interpretation ====
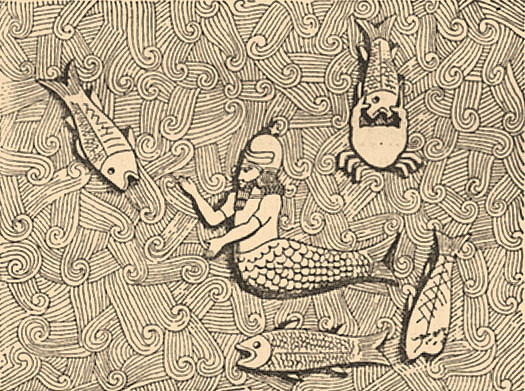
"Apkallu" relief from Khorsabad

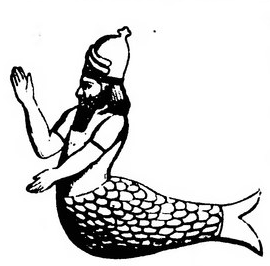
Relief of a Mesopotamian fishman (Kulullû) identified in accordance with early 20th century scholarship as Dagan in "A Practical Commentary on Holy Scripture" (1910)

The earliest known reference to the "fish" etymology appears in a 4th-century glossary of biblical names attributed to the Christian theologian and translator Jerome, where he interprets the hebrew name Dagon as "the fish of sorrow" (latin piscis tristitiae, hebrew dag yāgôn). That interpretation was followed by 11th-century Jewish Bible commentator Rashi, who wrote "The idol was made in the form of a fish" on Samuel 5.2 . In the 13th century, David Kimhi interpreted the odd sentence in 1 Samuel 5.2–7 that "only Dagon was left to him" to mean "only the form of a fish was left", adding: "It is said that Dagon, from his navel down, had the form of a fish (whence his name, Dagon), and from his navel up, the form of a man, as it is said, his two hands were cut off." The Septuagint text of 1 Samuel 5.2–7 says that both the hands and the head of the image of Dagon were broken off.

The "fish" etymology, while late and incorrect, was accepted in 19th and early 20th century scholarship. It led to an erroneous association between Dagan and Odakon, a half-fish being mentioned by Berossus, and with "fishman" motifs in Mesopotamian art, in reality depictions of Kulullû, an apotropaic creature associated with the god Ea.

The first to cast doubt on the "fish" etymology was Hartmut Schmökel in his 1928 study of Dagan, though he initially nonetheless suggested that while Dagon was not in origin a "fish god", the association with dâg "fish" among the maritime Canaanites (Phoenicians) would have affected the god's iconography. However, later he correctly identified it as a medieval invention. Modern researchers not only do not accept it, but even question if Dagan/Dagon was worshiped in coastal areas in any significant capacity at all.

=== Dagon and Marnas ===
In the Classical period, the central temple of Gaza was dedicated to a god named Marnas (from Aramaic marnā, "lord"). Itamar Singer considered it a possibility that this name was a title of the hypothetical Philistine Dagon, though he notes he was equated not with a Levantine or Syrian deity but with Cretan Zeus, Zeus Krētagenēs. However, Gerard Mussies considers Marnas and Dagan to be two separate deities. According to Taco Terpstra, Marnas' origins are "nebulous," and while his name can be plausibly assumed to be Aramaic, his iconography follows Hellenistic conventions. At times he is shown naked, similar to a naked and bearded Zeus, either seated on a throne or standing while holding a lightning bolt. Other images show him in a form similar to Apollo, holding a bow and standing on a pedestal in front of a female deity. Regardless of the variety of depictions, the abundance of them on coins indicates that the inhabitants of Gaza held him in high esteem and associated this god with their city. Textual sources portray him as a "sky god who also performed oracles." An indirect reference to Marnas occurs in an inscription from Roman Portus from the reign of Gordian III (238-244 CE), which relays that the city of Gaza honored this ruler "at the prompting of its ancestral god."

Marnas is mentioned in the works of the fourth century scholar and theologian Jerome, in several stories from his Life of St. Hilarion, written around 390 CE, in which he condemns his adherents as idolatrous and as "enemies of God." Violent sentiments against the cult of Marnas and the destruction of his temple in Gaza, the Marneion, are described by Mark the Deacon in his account of the life of the early fifth-century saint Porphyry of Gaza (Vita Porphyri). After the destruction of Marnas's temple, Mark petitioned the emperor Arcadius through his wife Eudoxia to grant a request to have all pagan temples in Gaza destroyed. Terpstra notes there is no direct evidence for the historicity of this account, as Porphyry is not mentioned by other contemporary authors and is entirely absent from inscriptions. However, it does indeed appear that, in the early fifth century, the temple of Marnas was replaced by a Christian church. However, the majority of Gazans were not Christians in the fifth century CE, and likely continued to worship their city's tutelary deity.

== In popular culture ==
Dagon has appeared or is referenced in many works of popular culture.

Notable examples include John Milton's epic poems Samson Agonistes and Paradise Lost, "Dagon" and "The Shadow Over Innsmouth" by H. P. Lovecraft, Dagon by Fred Chappell, Middlemarch by George Eliot, King of Kings by Malachi Martin, and Good Omens by Terry Pratchett and Neil Gaiman.

Also, the extinct prehistoric beaked whale species, Dagonodum mojnum, is named after Dagon.

== General and cited references ==
- Archi, Alfonso (1997). "Studies in the Ebla Pantheon, II". Orientalia. 66 (4): 414–425. ISSN 0030-5367. JSTOR 43078145.
- Archi, Alfonso (2002). "Formation of the West Hurrian Pantheon: The Case of Išḫara". Recent Developments in Hittite Archaeology and History. Penn State University Press. pp. 21–34. doi:10.1515/9781575065267-003. ISBN 978-1-57506-526-7.
- Archi, Alfonso (2004). "Translation of Gods: Kumarpi, Enlil, Dagan/NISABA, Ḫalki". Orientalia. 73 (4): 319–336. ISSN 0030-5367. JSTOR 43078173.
- Archi, Alfonso (2010). "Hadda of Halab and his Temple in the Ebla Period". Iraq. 72: 3–17. doi:10.1017/S0021088900000565. ISSN 0021-0889. JSTOR 20779017. S2CID 191962310.
- Archi, Alfonso (2013). "The West Hurrian Pantheon and Its Background". In Collins, B. J.; Michalowski, P. (eds.). Beyond Hatti: a tribute to Gary Beckman. Atlanta: Lockwood Press. ISBN 978-1-937040-11-6. OCLC 882106763.
- Archi, Alfonso (2015). Ebla and Its Archives. De Gruyter. doi:10.1515/9781614517887. ISBN 978-1-61451-716-0.
- Ayali-Darshan, Noga (2013). "Baal, Son of Dagan: In Search of Baal's Double Paternity". Journal of the American Oriental Society. 133 (4): 651. doi:10.7817/jameroriesoci.133.4.0651. ISSN 0003-0279.
- Ayali-Darshan, Noga (2015). "The Other Version of the Story of the Storm-god's Combat with the Sea in the Light of Egyptian, Ugaritic, and Hurro-Hittite Texts". Journal of Ancient Near Eastern Religions. 15 (1): 20–51. doi:10.1163/15692124-12341268. ISSN 1569-2116.
- Black, Jeremy; Green, Anthony (1992). Gods, Demons and Symbols of Ancient Mesopotamia: An Illustrated Dictionary. The British Museum Press. ISBN 978-0-7141-1705-8.
- Curtin, D.P. (2019-01-08). The First Book of Ethiopian Maccabees: with additional commentary. Dalcassian Publishing Company. ISBN 978-88-295-9233-3.
- Feliu, Lluís (1999). "The lord of the offspring". Aula orientalis: Revista de estudios del Próximo Oriente Antiguo. 17 (18): 197–200. ISSN 0212-5730.
- Feliu, Lluís (2003). The god Dagan in Bronze Age Syria. Leiden Boston, MA: Brill. ISBN 90-04-13158-2. OCLC 52107444.
- Feliu, Lluís (2007). "Two brides for two gods. The case of Šala and Šalaš". He unfurrowed his brow and laughed. Münster: Ugarit-Verlag. ISBN 978-3-934628-32-8. OCLC 191759910.
- Fontenrose, Joseph (1957). "Dagon and El". Oriens. 10 (2): 277–279. doi:10.2307/1579640. ISSN 0078-6527. JSTOR 1579640.
- Frantz-Szabó, Gabriella; Lambert, Wilfred G. (1980). "Išḫara". Reallexikon der Assyriologie.
- George, Andrew R. (1992). Babylonian topographical texts. Leuven: Departement Oriëntalistiek Peeters. ISBN 978-90-6831-410-6. OCLC 27918563.
- Güterbock, Hans Gustav (1983). "Kumarbi". Reallexikon der Assyriologie.
- Hutter, Manfred (1996). Religionen in der Umwelt des Alten Testaments I. Köln: Kohlhammer. ISBN 3-17-012041-7.
- Lambert, Wilfred G. (2013). Babylonian Creation Myths. Winona Lake, Indiana: Eisenbrauns. ISBN 978-1-57506-861-9. OCLC 861537250.
- Montalbano, Frank J. (1951). "Canaanite Dagan: Origin, Nature". The Catholic Biblical Quarterly. 13 (4): 381–397. ISSN 0008-7912. JSTOR 43720336.
- Mussies, Gerard (1990). "Marnas God of Gaza". In Haase, Wolfgang (ed.). Aufstieg und Niedergang der römischen Welt (ANRW). Religion. Berlin, Boston: De Gruyter. doi:10.1515/9783110877274-007. ISBN 978-3-11-087727-4.
- Nakata, Ichiro (1995). "A Study of Women's Theophoric Personal Names in Old Babylonian Texts from Mari". Orient. 30and31: 234–253. doi:10.5356/orient1960.30and31.234. ISSN 1884-1392.
- Nakata, Ichiro (2011). "The god Itur-Mer in the middle Euphrates region during the Old Babylonian period". Revue d'assyriologie et d'archéologie orientale. 105 (1): 129. doi:10.3917/assy.105.0129. ISSN 0373-6032. S2CID 194094468.
- Nowicki, Stefan (2016). "Sargon of Akkade and his god" (PDF). Acta Orientalia Academiae Scientiarum Hungaricae. 69 (1): 63–82. doi:10.1556/062.2016.69.1.4. ISSN 0001-6446.
- del Olmo Lete, Gregorio (2013). "2013-KTU 1.107: A miscellany of incantations against snakebite". Ritual, religion and reason: studies in the ancient world in honour of Paolo Xella. Münster: Ugarit-Verlag. ISBN 978-3-86835-087-6. OCLC 849900282.
- Pongratz-Leisten, Beate (2011). "Assyrian Royal Discourse Between Local and Imperial Traditions at the Hābūr". Revue d'Assyriologie et d'archéologie orientale. 105: 109–128. doi:10.3917/assy.105.0109. ISSN 0373-6032. JSTOR 42580243.
- Pongratz-Leisten, Beate (2012). "Comments on the Translatability of Divinity: Cultic and Theological Responses to the Presence of the Other in the Ancient near East". In Bonnet, Corinne (ed.). Les représentations des dieux des autres. Caltanissetta: Sciascia. ISBN 978-88-8241-388-0. OCLC 850438175.
- Pritchard, James (1969). Ancient Near Eastern texts relating to the Old Testament. Princeton, N.J: Princeton University Press. ISBN 978-0-691-03503-1. OCLC 382005.
- Sallaberger, Walther (2007). "From Urban Culture to Nomadism: A History of Upper Mesopotamia in the Late Third Millennium". Sociétés humaines et changement climatique à la fin du troisième millénaire: une crise a-t-elle eu lieu en haute Mésopotamie?: actes du colloque de Lyon, 5-8 décembre 2005. Istanbul: Institut français d'études anatolienne Georges-Dumézil. ISBN 978-2-906053-94-6. OCLC 181359300.
- Schmökel, Hartmut (1928). Der Gott Dagan: Ursprung, Verbreitung und Wesen seines Kultes. Inaugural-Dissertation zur Erlangung der Doktorwürde der Hohen Philosophischen Fakultät der Ruprecht-Karls-Universität zu Heidelberg (in German). Universitätsverlag von Robert Noske.
- Schmökel, Hartmut (1938). "Dagan". Reallexikon der Assyriologie.
- Schwemer, Daniel (2007). "The Storm-Gods of the Ancient Near East: Summary, Synthesis, Recent Studies Part I" (PDF). Journal of Ancient Near Eastern Religions. 7 (2): 121–168. doi:10.1163/156921207783876404. ISSN 1569-2116.
- Schwemer, Daniel (2008). "The Storm-Gods of the Ancient Near East: Summary, Synthesis, Recent Studies: Part II" (PDF). Journal of Ancient Near Eastern Religions. 8 (1): 1–44. doi:10.1163/156921208786182428. ISSN 1569-2116. Archived from the original (PDF) on 2023-01-05.
- Singer, Itamar (1992). "Towards the image of Dagon, the god of the Philistines". Syria. 69 (3): 431–450. doi:10.3406/syria.1992.7297. ISSN 0039-7946.
- van Soldt, Wilfred H. (2016). "Divinities in Personal Names at Ugarit, Ras Shamra". Etudes ougaritiques IV. Paris Leuven Walpole MA: Editions recherche sur les civilisations, Peeters. ISBN 978-90-429-3439-9. OCLC 51010262.
- Steinkeller, Piotr (1982). "The Mesopotamian God Kakka". Journal of Near Eastern Studies. 41 (4): 289–294. doi:10.1086/372968. ISSN 0022-2968. JSTOR 544089. S2CID 161219123.
- Stone, Adam (2013). "Dagan (god)". Ancient Mesopotamian Gods and Goddesses. Ancient Mesopotamian Gods and Goddesses. Open Richly Annotated Cuneiform Corpus, UK Higher Education Academy.
- Taracha, Piotr (2009). Religions of Second Millennium Anatolia. Harrassowitz. ISBN 978-3-447-05885-8.
- Terpstra, Taco (2019). Trade in the ancient Mediterranean: private order and public institutions. Princeton, New Jersey Oxford: Princeton University Press. ISBN 978-0-691-17208-8. OCLC 1086610515.
- Tugendhaft, Aaron (2012). "How to Become a Brother in the Bronze Age: An Inquiry into the Representation of Politics in Ugaritic Myth". Fragments: Interdisciplinary Approaches to the Study of Ancient and Medieval Pasts. 2. ISSN 2161-8585.
- Wiggermann, Frans A. M. (1992). Mesopotamian protective spirits: the ritual texts. Groningen: STYX & PP Publications. ISBN 978-90-72371-52-2. OCLC 27914917.
- Wilhelm, Gernot (1989). The Hurrians. Warminster, England: Aris & Phillips. ISBN 978-0-85668-442-5. OCLC 21036268.
- Yamada, Masamichi (2011). "The Zukru Festival and Its Preparatory Rituals in Emar VI 373". Orient. 46: 141–160. doi:10.5356/orient.46.141. ISSN 0473-3851.
- Zadok, Ran (1989). "On the Onomastic Material from Emar". Die Welt des Orients. 20/21: 45–61. ISSN 0043-2547. JSTOR 25683328.
