= Yakrub-El =

Mesopotamian god worshiped in Terqa

- Deified hero or ancestor
- Major cult center: Terqa

Yakrub-El or Ikrub-El was a Mesopotamian god worshiped in Terqa in the kingdom of Mari in the early Old Babylonian period. Since his name is structured as if it were a theophoric personal name, is commonly assumed that he was a deified hero or ancestral figure in origin. He is absent from the sources postdating the destruction of Mari.

== Name and character ==
Yakrub-El's name is structured like a theophoric name, and can be translated as "the god blesses." While Icihiro Nakata in an early study of this deity concluded that it should be understood as a reference a deity identical with Ugaritic El, Alfonso Archi argues that the elements el and il in Akkadian, Eblaite and Amorite names do not designate a specific deity, and considers the emergence of the god El to be an Ugaritic religious innovation. Variants of the name Yakrub-El already occur in the oldest Akkadian documents as given names. A single ordinary person bearing the name Yakrub-El is attested even in the corpus of Mari texts.

Multiple spellings are attested in known cuneiform texts, including ^{d}Ik-ru-ub-El, ^{d}Ik-ru-ub-Il, ^{d}Ik-ru-ub-AN, ^{d}Ik-ru-bé-El, ^{d}Ik-ru-bé-AN, ^{d}Ya-ak-ru-ub-El, ^{d}Ya-ak-ru-ub-Il and ^{d}Ya-ak-ru-ub-AN. The alternation between El and Il might indicate lack of differentiation between the phonemes e and i, a possibility also supported by other examples of Mariote scribal conventions. AN (the dingir cuneiform sign) was a logographic representation of the same word. These writings are all attested in a single type of texts, namely the letters sent by Kibri-Dagan, a governor of Terqa, which makes the high number of variants unusual.

Deities whose names mirror ordinary theophoric names, such as Yakrub-El, Itūr-Mēr, Tašqi-Mama and Tar’am-Mēr are often assumed to represent deified ancestors. Lluís Feliu proposes that Yakrub-El was specifically a deified chief of an Amorite clan, while Ichiro Nakata in an earlier publication more cautiously refers to him and similar deities as "originally heroes of one type or another."

== Worship ==
In texts from Old Babylonian Mari, Yakrub-El appears exclusively in association with Terqa and its immediate surroundings. Ichiro Nakata has suggested that he could be referred to as the "lord" (lugal) of this city, though other researchers, including Jean-Marie Durand and Amanda Podany, generally presume that the deity designated this way would instead be Dagan. Lluís Feliu assumes that Dagan was the god of the city of Terqa, while Yakrub-El represented the surrounding district (ḫalṣum) and its population, both permanently settled and nomadic, and suggested it might have been an example of a broader pattern of local pantheons combining gods already known from the third millennium BCE, worshiped chiefly in the urban centers of the region, with ones brought through population movements. He considers Itūr-Mēr to be another example of a deity belonging to the latter group. Yakrub-El was commonly associated with Dagan in religious texts. They appear together in greeting formulas from Terqa. One example can be found in a letter to Zimri-Lim from Kibri-Dagan, the governor of this city: "Dagan and Yakrub-El are well. The city of Terqa and the district are well".

Multiple texts from the so-called "archive of Asqudum" (for example MA:T 22, MA:T 23, MA:T 24 ) mention sacrifices of sheep to Yakrub-El made in Terqa alongside the offerings to many other deities, such as Shamash, Nergal and Annunitum. He is attested in theophoric names as well, with examples including Yakrub-El-andullī ("Yakrub-El is my protection") and Yakrub-El-tillalī ("Yakrub-El is my help"). Despite being a theophoric name itself, the theonym is evidently treated as if it were a single word in these cases. A legal text mentions that Kibri-Dagan and a "judge of the king" (dayyān šarrim) pronounced a verdict in front of Yakrub-El and Lagamal.

A letter to Zimri-Lim from Šamaš-nasir, an official stationed in Terqa, relays an oracle of Dagan in which Yakrub-El is mentioned. While the main topic is a verdict pronounced by Dagan for Tishpak, Yakrub-El also plays an active role and brings him the words of the goddess Ḫanat from Suhum, presumably endangered by the actions of the Eshnunnean god. It has been pointed out that this text is most likely using the gods to describe the political situation at the time of the Mari archives, with Dagan standing for the kingdom of Mari, Yakrub-El for Terqa, Ḫanat for Suhum, and Tishpak for Eshnunna, whose troops were presumably threatening the latter of the aforementioned areas within the orbit of Mari.

As of 2011, no published documents from Terqa from the later part of the Old Babylonian period mentioning Yakrub-El were known. Ichiro Nakata suggests that he might have ceased to be worshiped after Itūr-Mēr was introduced to the city's pantheon, possibly by members of the administration or clergy from Mari who fled there after the destruction of that city during the campaigns of Hammurabi of Babylon.
