= Shulgi-simti =

Shulgi-simti (also Šulgi-simti or Šulgi-simtum) (fl. c. 2070 BC) was the wife or concubine of Shulgi, second king of the Third Dynasty of Ur. She is known from a large number of cuneiform texts coming from her household at Puzrish-Dagan new Nippur. Her name is Akkadian, but the exact meaning is uncertain; evidently the name refers to her husband Shulgi and might be translated as Shulgi is my glory, although this is only a guess. The name was given to her when she came to Shulgi. Nothing is known about her former life and her family. There is some debate about her position. Many scholars regard her as queen, but others argue that there are only very few texts referring to her as queen and that those are open to different interpretations. Therefore, it seems most likely that she was just a concubine.

Shulgi-simti is mainly known from the archive of her household providing much evidence for people working for her and her economic power. Her secretary was Maš-gu-la. Several messengers are known. Several men looked after her livestock. Although most of her texts come from Puzrish-Dagan, it seems that she actually lived in Ur.

The cuneiform text archive of Shulgi-simti was found by illegal excavations around 1909. The cuneiform tablets are now mainly in the Oriental Institute of the University of Chicago and in the Montserrat Abbey in Spain. The texts in the archive mainly deal with a transaction in a religious foundation most likely made by Shulgi-simti. The archive stops with her death. The texts can be divided into two groups: incomes and expenditures. The texts provide the names of people working for Shulgi-simti and many further details about economic transactions. However, in comparison to other households, her estate seems to be rather modest.

It has been suggested that on the death of Shulgi she changed her name to Abi-simti, a name known during the reigns of the following rulers of Ur.

== Literature ==
- Sharlach, Tonia M. (2017). An Ox of One's Own, Royal Wives and Religion at the Court of the Third Dynasty of Ur. Berlin/Boston: Walter de Gruyter GmbH. ISBN 978-1-5015-1447-0.
