= Wilfred G. Lambert =

British assyriologist (1926–2011)

Wilfred George Lambert FBA
- Born: 26 February 1926; Chudleigh Road, Erdington, Birmingham, United Kingdom
- Died: 9 November 2011 (aged 85)

Academic background
- Education: King Edward's School, Birmingham; Christ's College, Cambridge

Academic work
- Discipline: Assyriology
- Institutions: Westminster School; University of Toronto; Johns Hopkins University; Birmingham University; École pratique des hautes études British Museum
- Doctoral students: Irving Finkel

Wilfred George Lambert FBA (26 February 1926 – 9 November 2011) was a British historian and archaeologist, a specialist in Assyriology and Near Eastern Archaeology.

== Early life ==
Lambert was born in Birmingham, and, having won a scholarship, he was educated at King Edward's School, Birmingham. He obtained two degrees, in Classics and Oriental Languages, at Christ's College, University of Cambridge.

== Academic career ==
Lambert taught and researched at the University of Birmingham for thirty years, during which period he made weekly trips to work on deciphering cuneiform tablets in the British Museum. After retirement, he worked with the Museum on their Catalogue of the Western Asiatic Seals Project, dealing with the inscriptions on the seals. In January 2010, Professor Lambert and Irving Finkel identified pieces from a cuneiform tablet that was inscribed with the same text as the Cyrus Cylinder.

Lambert was an external consultant for the Chicago Assyrian Dictionary. His work, 'Introduction: the transmission of the literary and scholarly texts', in Cuneiform Texts in the Metropolitan Museum of Art II: Literary and scholastic texts of the first millennium BC, was used as background material for The Higher Education Academy's project, Knowledge and Power in the Neo-Assyrian Empire. He was also noted for his new discoveries in relation to the Gilgamesh text.

== Contributions to Assyriology ==
Lambert was widely regarded as one of the foremost Assyriologists of the 20th century, known for his meticulous philological work and contributions to the decipherment and interpretation of cuneiform texts. His scholarship significantly advanced the understanding of Mesopotamian religion, wisdom literature, and mythology. Among his most influential works is Babylonian Wisdom Literature (1960), which brought new attention to ancient Near Eastern didactic and philosophical texts, including dialogues, fables, and instructions. He also played a critical role in the study and reconstruction of the Enūma Eliš, the Babylonian creation epic, and provided authoritative editions of Akkadian texts that remain standard references in the field.

Beyond his publications, Lambert contributed to the field through decades of teaching at the University of Birmingham and active participation in major international research projects, including work with the Chicago Assyrian Dictionary and the State Archives of Assyria. His expertise in Sumerian and Akkadian lexicography, as well as his comparative approach to Mesopotamian and biblical traditions, earned him widespread respect. Lambert was elected a Fellow of the British Academy in 1971, a recognition of his scholarly impact and intellectual leadership in ancient Near Eastern studies.

== Criticism ==
Wilfred G. Lambert has been criticized by later scholars for minimizing the role of goddesses in ancient Mesopotamian religion and for interpreting divine hierarchies through a patriarchal framework. Critics argue that Lambert's scholarship often prioritized male deities such as Enlil and Marduk while presenting goddesses—such as Inanna, Ninhursag, and Ereshkigal—as subordinate figures, typically defined by their relationships to male gods. This interpretive approach has been viewed as reflective of mid-20th-century academic norms rather than the religious realities of the ancient Near East, where female divinities frequently occupied positions of independent theological authority.

Scholars such as Julia M. Asher-Greve, Joan Goodnick Westenholz, and Ilona Zsolnay have argued that Lambert's work reinforced androcentric interpretations by privileging texts such as the Enūma Eliš, which foreground male ascendancy, while overlooking earlier or parallel traditions where goddesses like Inanna exerted cosmic, political, and cultic authority. As a result, Lambert's approach is said to have contributed to a broader underrepresentation of female divinities in Assyriological literature. Feminist and gender-critical frameworks developed in more recent decades have sought to reassess the prominence of goddesses within their original sociocultural and theological contexts, in many cases challenging conclusions drawn in Lambert's interpretations.

While Lambert's philological contributions to the study of Mesopotamian literature and religion remain highly influential, these criticisms have led to a more critical reassessment of his legacy. Contemporary scholarship in Assyriology increasingly emphasizes the importance of evaluating divine figures—especially goddesses—outside the constraints of modern patriarchal assumptions.

== Personal life ==
Lambert was a Christadelphian, and a conscientious objector. From 1944, he worked in a horticultural nursery north of Birmingham in lieu of military service and supervised Italian prisoners of war in their work. Later, in his spare time, he was editor of one of his church's quarterly magazines. Lambert was a lifelong vegetarian.

== Appointments and memberships ==
- 1959–64: Associate Professor and Chair of Oriental Seminary, Johns Hopkins University
- 1970–93: Professor of Assyriology, University of Birmingham.
- 1984: President of the Society for Old Testament Study.

Lambert was elected a Fellow of the British Academy in 1971. He was also a presenting member of the Rencontre Assyriologique Internationale (International Congress of Assyriology and Near Eastern Archaeology).

== Bibliography ==
This is a partial bibliography:

=== Books ===
- Morals in ancient Mesopotamia Jaarbericht 15. Ex Oriente Lux. (1957–58) pp184–196.
- Babylonian Wisdom Literature 1960. (221.849.2 L222)
- A new Babylonian Theogony and Hesiod W. G. Lambert and Peter Walcot (1931–2009). Kadmos 4 (1965) pp64–72.
- Ancient Near Eastern seals in Birmingham Collections (1966)
- Atra-Hasis: The Babylonian Story of the Flood by W. G. Lambert, A. R. Millard, and Miguel Civil. (Oxford 1969).
- Catalogue of the Cuneiform Tablets in the Kouyunjik Collection of the British Museum (Jan. 1992)
- Art of the Eastern World by Geza Fehérvári, W. G. Lambert, Ralph H. Pinder-Wilson, and Marian Wenzel (1996)
- The Qualifications of Babylonian Diviners W.G. Lambert in Festschrift für Rykle Borger (1998).
- Cuneiform Texts in the Metropolitan Museum of Art. Volume II: Literary and Scholastic Texts of the First Millennium BC edited by Ira Spar and W. G. Lambert. (2005)
- Babylonian Oracle Questions Eisenbrauns, 2007 (ISBN 9781575061368)
- Babylonian Creation Myths Eisenbrauns, 2013

=== In honour of ===
- Wisdom, Gods and literature: studies in Assyriology in honour of W.G. Lambert By Wilfred G. Lambert, A. R. George, Irving L. Finkel 2002 462pp

=== Conference papers ===
- Babylonian Siege Equipment. 52e Rencontre Assyriologique Internationale. Krieg und Frieden im Alten Vorderasien, Münster, 17–21 July 2006

=== Book reviews ===
- Review of Erica Reiner Astral Magic in Babylonia in The Journal of the American Oriental Society 1999
- Review of Charles Penglase Greek Myths and Mesopotamia: Parallels and Influence in the Homeric Hymns and Hesiod. 1997 in The Journal of the American Oriental Society
