= Hammurabi =

Sixth king of Babylon (r. 1792–1750 BC)

Hammurabi 𒄩𒄠𒈬𒊏𒁉
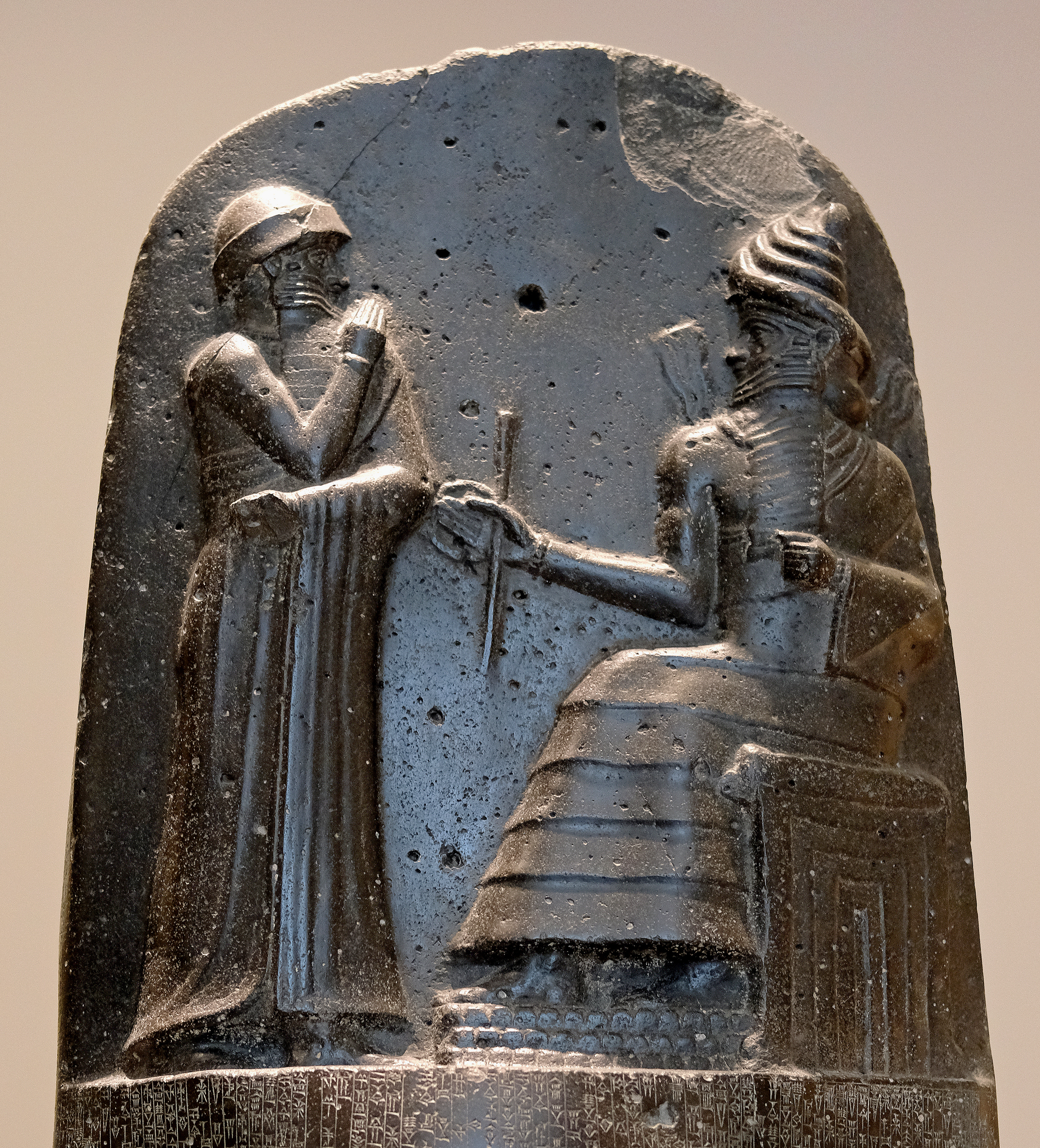
- Hammurabi (left) receiving his royal insignia from Shamash.

King of Babylon
- Reign: c. 1792 – c. 1750 BC
- Predecessor: Sin-Muballit
- Successor: Samsu-iluna
- Born: c. 1810 BC; City of Babylon, Babylon
- Died: c. 1750 BC (aged c. 60); City of Babylon, Babylon
- Issue: Sumu-ditana; Mutu-Numaha; Samsu-iluna; 1 daughter

Hammurabi (/ˌhæmʊˈrɑːbi/; Old Babylonian Akkadian: 𒄩𒄠𒈬𒊏𒁉, romanized: Ḫammu-rāpi; Akkadian: [xammuˈraːpʰi]; c. 1810 BC – c. 1750 BC), also spelled Hammurapi, was an Amorite king of Babylon, reigning from c. 1792 BC to c. 1750 BC. He was preceded by his father, Sin-muballit.

During his reign, he conquered the powerful kingdoms of Larsa, Eshnunna, and Mari, bringing almost all of Mesopotamia under Babylonian rule. It was under his rule that Babylon rose to the status of a leading kingdom on the political stage of the Middle East, and that the foundations were laid for it to become one of the major cities of ancient history.

Hammurabi is best known for having issued his law code, said to have been inspired by Shamash, the Babylonian god of Justice. It is one of the oldest legal texts ever discovered, and the longest to have survived from the ancient Near East. His reign is also one of the Mesopotamian reigns best documented by written records, particularly thanks to the correspondence unearthed in two of the cities he subjugated, Larsa and Mari, which sheds light on various facets of how he exercised power during the second half of his reign.

His son Samsu-iluna succeeded him but failed to maintain the empire he had built. After his death, Hammurabi was revered as a great conqueror, but later his military accomplishments became de-emphasized and his role as the ideal lawgiver became the primary aspect of his legacy. Hammurabi was rediscovered by archaeologists in the late 19th century and has since been seen as an important figure in the history of law.

== Name ==
The name of Hammurabi written in cuneiform script (ḫa-am-mu-ra-bi) in documents from his reign: copies of a foundation inscription from Larsa (top, archaizing script) and one of his letters from Larsa (bottom, common script).

The meaning of the name Hammurabi is a matter of debate. The most common translation is, in Amorite or Akkadian, “the ancestor is great,” Ḫammu-rabi, divided in two parts: ḫammu(m) or ‘ammu, meaning “ancestor,” and rabi, meaning “great” or “to be great.” An alternative reading, in Amorite, translates the name as “the ancestor heals,” ‘Ammu-rāpi. M. Streck, for his part, translates ‘ammu as “paternal uncle,” which he interprets as a reference to a protective deity.

This name was borne by kings contemporary with Hammurabi, the most important being Hammurabi I of Yamhad (Aleppo), as well as by other Amorite kings of Syria who reigned subsequently. It was common among the Amorites for a man holding the rank of chieftain to bear a name referring to his ancestors, as connection to a lineage and dynastic continuity were essential to his legitimacy.

== Sources ==
=== Written sources ===
The sources documenting Hammurabi’s reign are primarily written. These texts have been unearthed at archaeological sites in present-day Iraq and Syria. Some come from official excavations (notably the tablets from Mari), while many are the result of clandestine excavations, which deprives historians of precise information about the context of their discovery.

These are cuneiform texts written on clay tablets, and also on stone, in two different languages: Babylonian, a dialect of Akkadian belonging to the Semitic languages family, which constituted the local language of the time; and in Sumerian, a language with no known relatives, spoken in Babylonia until the end of the 3rd millennium BC and which, during Hammurabi’s time, retained a certain prestige among the literate and scholarly classes (much like Latin in medieval and modern Europe). During the reigns of Hammurabi and his successors, however, Babylonian gradually supplanted Sumerian, acquiring the status of a scholarly language.

Cuneiform inscriptions from the Hammurabi period can be divided into three categories: commemorative inscriptions, archival texts, and educational texts. The first two, in particular, provide insight into Hammurabi’s reign. These written sources offer a relatively clear picture of the events that took place during the years covered by the Mari archives, corresponding to the period from the eighteenth to the thirty-second year of Hammurabi’s reign (from 1774 to 1761 BC), with the documentation being particularly extensive for the years preceding the fall of Mari. This means that political life during the second third of his reign is the best understood. As for the Babylonian kingdom, the first three decades of the reign are very poorly documented, whereas for the subsequent years, written records are more abundant and diverse (notably through royal inscriptions and texts from Larsa).

==== Commemorative texts ====
Commemorative texts are issued by the royal authority and therefore reflect the official view of events. These are primarily royal inscriptions, texts celebrating the king himself, often relatively short. Hammurabi was the first king of the First Dynasty of Babylon for whom this type of text, though common in ancient Mesopotamia, has survived, and yet they all appear to date from the period following the conquest of Larsa (after 1763 BC), that is, the last third of his reign.

His inscriptions primarily commemorate the construction or restoration of sanctuaries: these are so-called “foundation” inscriptions, buried beneath the monument that was the subject of the work. This would allow them to be rediscovered by later kings who, in turn, undertook to restore the building, thereby rediscovering Hammurabi’s achievements. Nevertheless, the best-known is the Code of Hammurabi, which takes the form of a lengthy inscription celebrating Hammurabi as a just king and guarantor of equity in his kingdom, and includes legal provisions.

Another type of commemorative text consists of the sovereign’s regnal years, which also celebrate memorable events of his reign, whether pious deeds or military victories. They are essential for reconstructing the relative chronology of Hammurabi’s reign (see below)

Finally, a few hymns in Sumerian and Akkadian celebrate Hammurabi.

==== Archives ====
The archival documents take the form of cuneiform tablets written in a style that is less literary than the previous ones, and thus closer to the spoken language. Many economic and legal texts date from the reign of Hammurabi: these are extremely rich sources for reconstructing the social and economic life of the period, and can also provide some information on political history. There are far more of these texts than those from his predecessors due to the expansion of the kingdom? But no archives of the Babylonian royal court have been unearthed for this period.

Far richer in information are the letters dating from Hammurabi’s reign, which directly concern his activities. Two collections provide documentation of great importance: one from the city of Mari in Syria, destroyed by Hammurabi in 1761 BC, where the Babylonians left behind part of the diplomatic correspondence from previous years, documenting in particular the rise to power of their kingdom; one from Larsa, following its conquest by Hammurabi in 1764 BC, which documents the activities of Babylonian officials who were in constant contact with Hammurabi to organize this province after its conquest. In total, just over 200 letters were written by Hammurabi, making him the Mesopotamian king with the largest number of known sent letters.

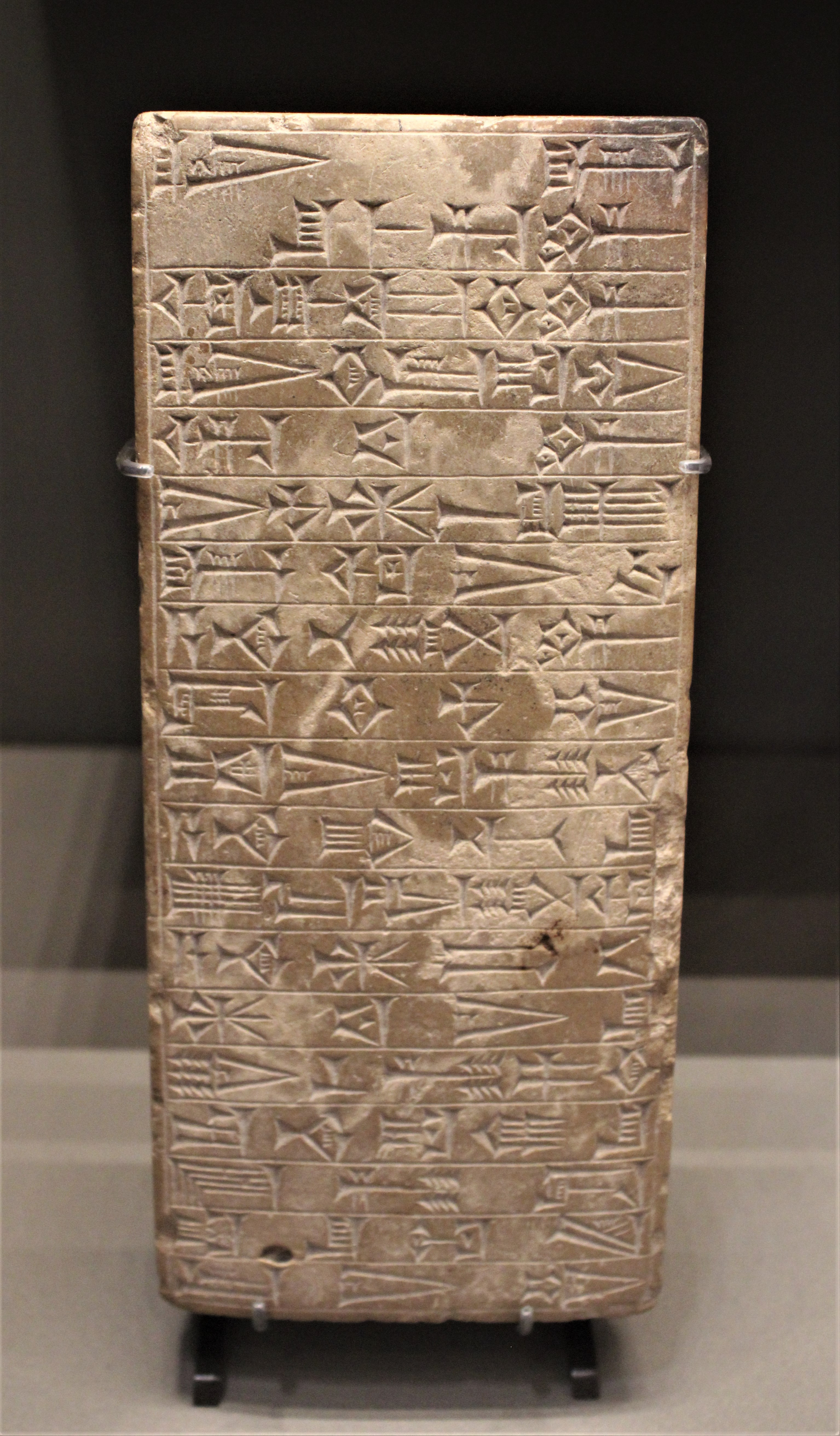
Limestone tablet, inscription by Hammurabi commemorating the restoration of the Ezida, the temple of Borsippa, for the god Marduk. Louvre Museum.

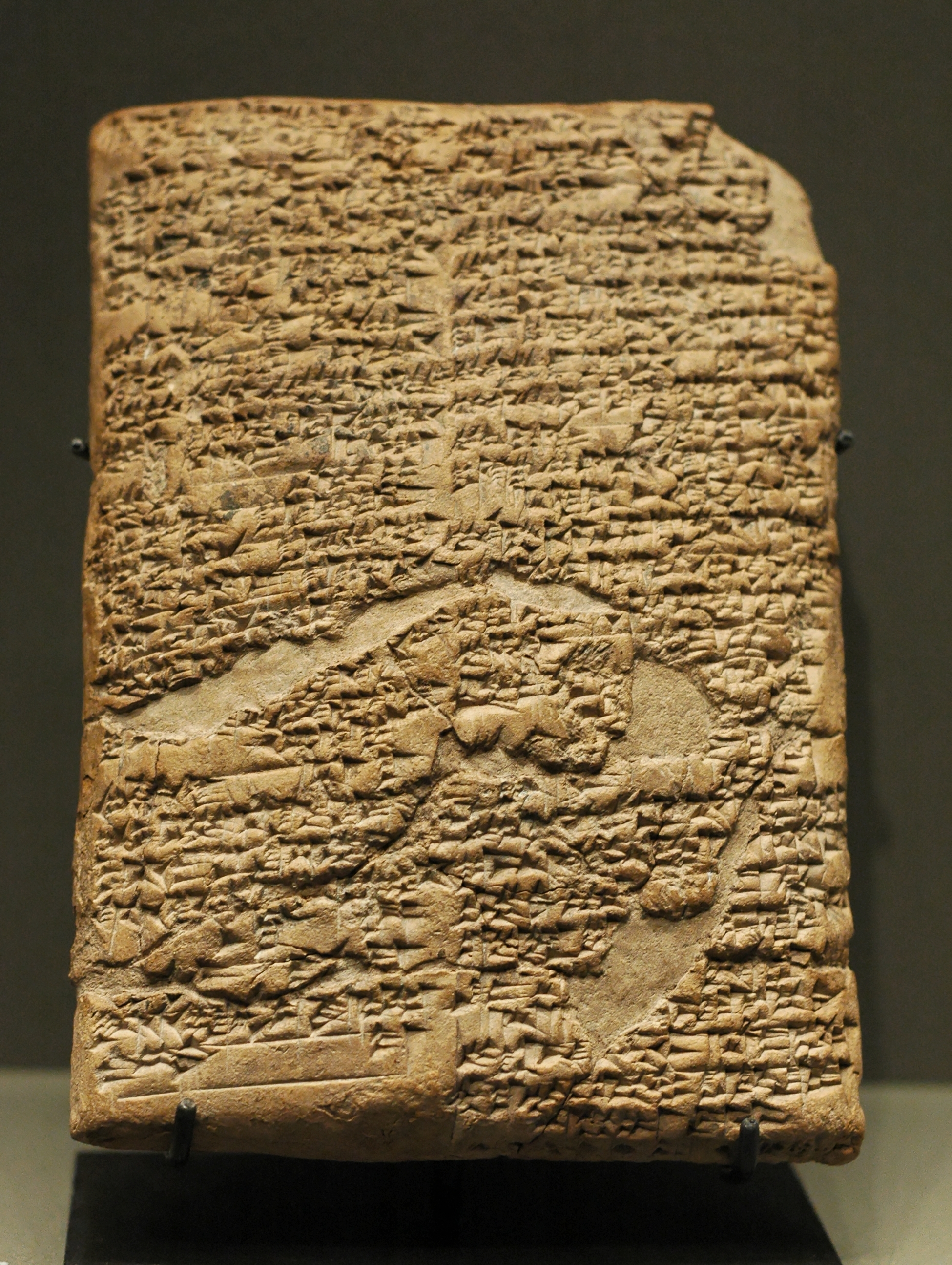
Tablet containing the prologue to the Code of Hammurabi, first half of the 18th century BC (likely predating the drafting of the stele). Louvre Museum.

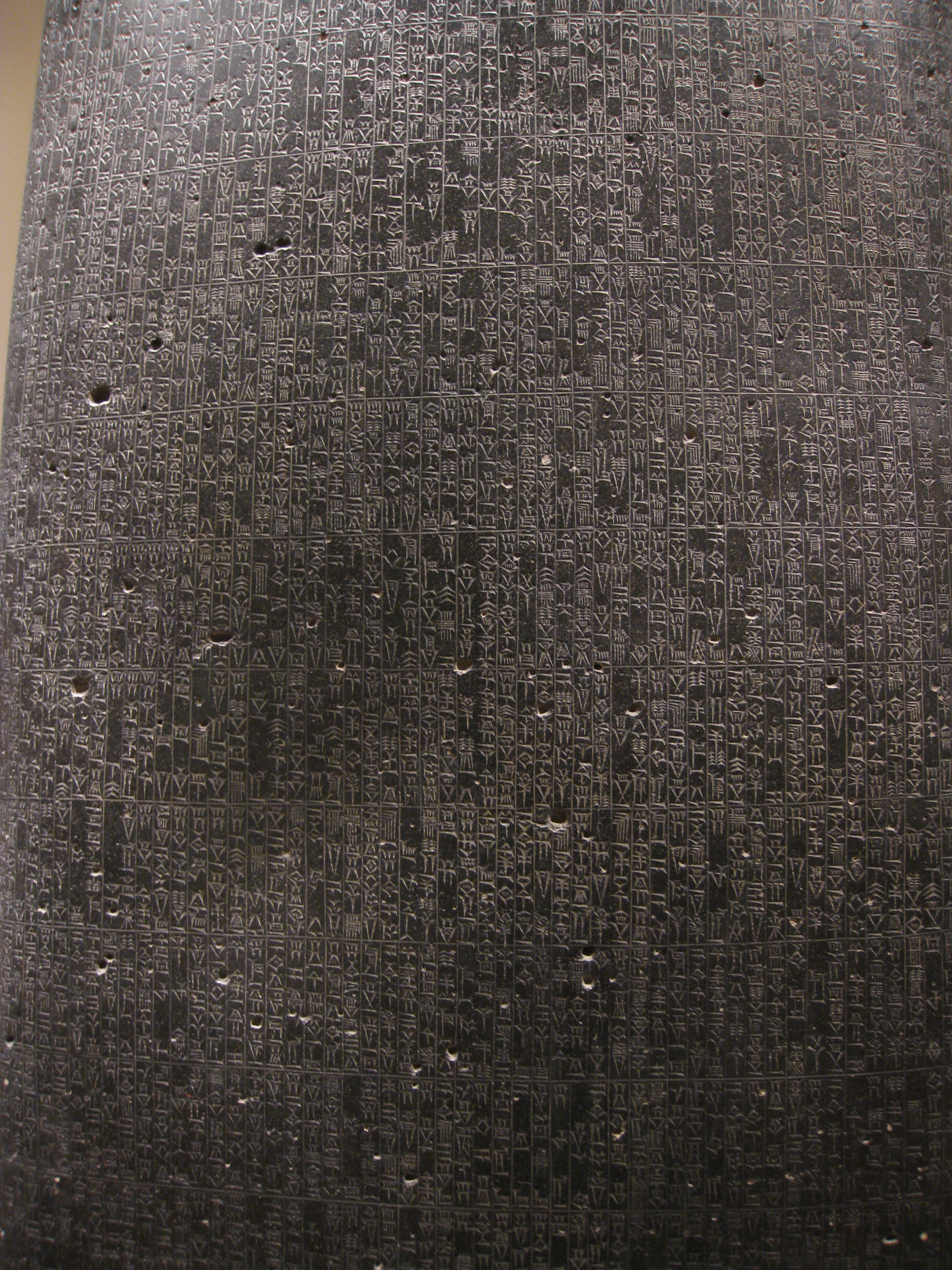
Detail of the inscription on the Code of Hammurabi stele. Louvre Museum.

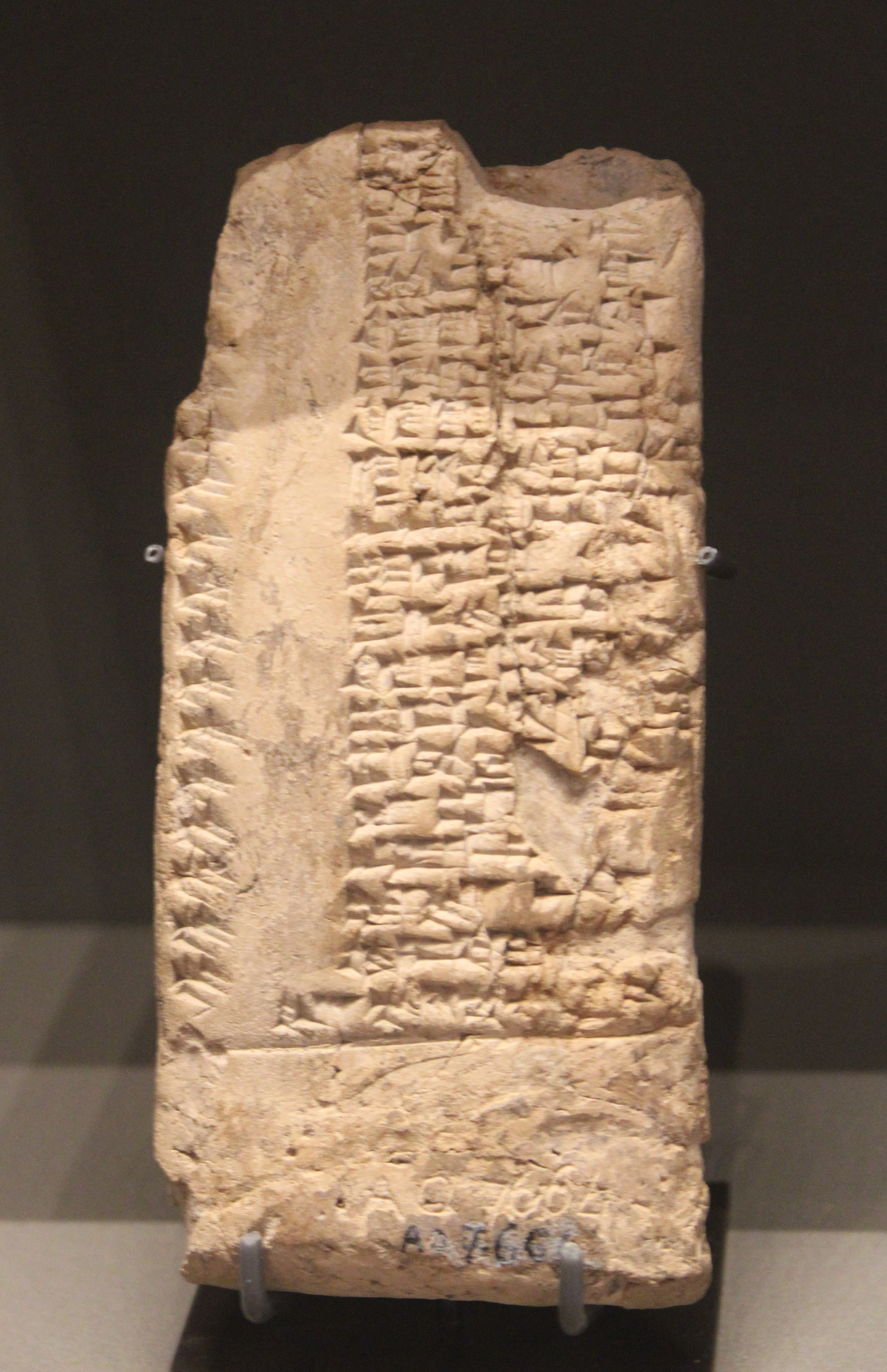
List of Hammurabi's year names. Louvre Museum.

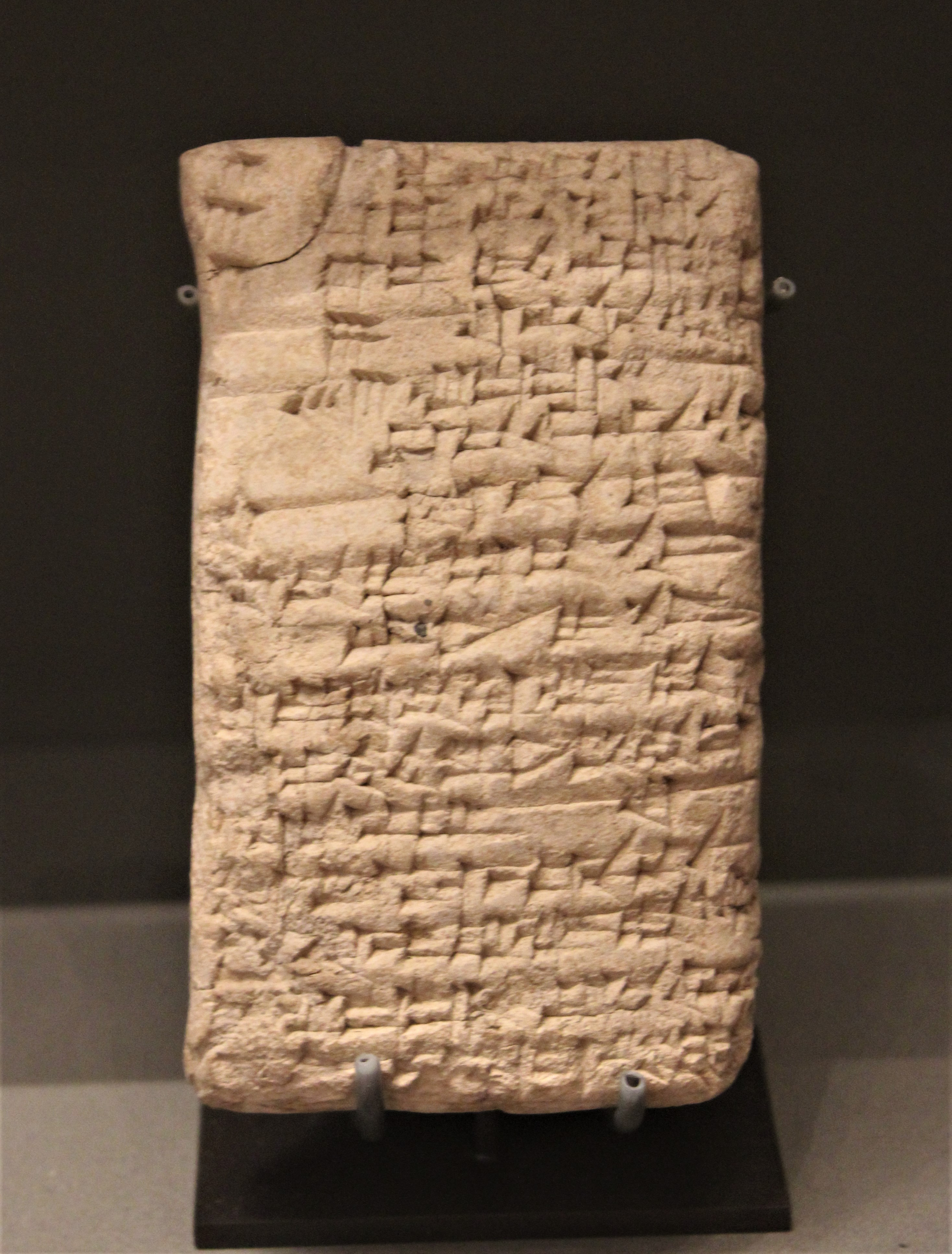
Letter from Hammurabi to Sin-iddinam, Babylonian official in Larsa, asking him to gather boatmen and send them to Babylon. Louvre Museum.

=== Non-written sources ===
In comparison to the written ones, there are far fewer non-written sources regarding Hammurabi's reign. Official sculpture from this period is poorly documented. Art is known primarily in the form of terracotta plaques or cylinder seals and impressions of cylinder seals on tablets. There are relatively few royal depictions dating from his reign, and from the First Dynasty of Babylon in general. The only confirmed depiction of Hammurabi is the one on the stele of his Code; others are disputed.

Hammurabi’s royal palace has not been identified in Babylon, and, in general, the archaeological strata of the First Dynasty of Babylon are very poorly understood in Babylon itself, as they are covered by the water table and thus beyond the reach of excavations.

== Dating ==
Several factors combine to make reconstructing the chronology of Hammurabi’s reign an approximate endeavor. The dates given in the rest of this article are established by convention but are clearly inaccurate; the question is to what extent they are so.

Babylonian sources indicate that Hammurabi reigned for 43 years. The dating system used at the time was based on year names: each year was named after a significant event that had taken place during the previous year, typically a religious act (work on a temple, the offering of a divine throne, etc.), a military victory, or the digging of a canal. The new name for the year was chosen at the end of each year.

Year names of Hammurabi’s reign are all known, which makes it possible to reconstruct the major events of his reign and place them in chronological order relative to one another.

Ancient texts also make it possible to synchronize Hammurabi’s reign with those of other contemporary rulers well-documented by sources: his accession occurred while Rim-Sin of Larsa and Samsi-Addu of Ekallatum and Upper Mesopotamia were in power, and the reign of Zimri-Lim of Mari took place during Hammurabi’s reign. This makes it possible to establish a relative chronology of his reign, although such synchronizations are often approximate.

Establishing an absolute chronology—that is, assigning dates to Hammurabi's reign within the conventional system of year-based dating (BC)—is an even more complex matter. Several dating systems have been proposed, "chronologies" that place Hammurabi's reign at different points in time within a span of nearly two centuries, ranging from the mid-19th to the mid-17th century BC. The most commonly used system, favored both out of habit and because it is generally considered the most accurate, is the "Middle" chronology; this places the reign in the middle of that range, from 1792 to 1750 BC (or, according to a proposed revision, from 1784 to 1742 BC). Under the "high" or "long" chronology, which has few remaining proponents, the reign is placed about half a century earlier, whereas under the "ultra-low" chronology, the most widely advocated alternative since the late 1990s, Hammurabi's reign would have occurred approximately a century after the conventionally accepted date.

Dating of Hammurabi's reign according to the various chronologies.
| Long or High | Middle | Short or Low | Ultra-Low |
|---|---|---|---|
| 1848-1806 BC | 1792-1750 BC | 1728-1686 BC | 1696-1654 BC |

== Reign ==
Map showing the Babylonian territory upon Hammurabi's ascension c. 1792 BC and upon his death c. 1750 BC

Location of the main sites in Mesopotamia and Syria dating from the Old Babylonian period.

=== Background ===
Hammurabi’s reign occurred at a pivotal moment in Mesopotamian history. Since the fall of the powerful empire of the Third Dynasty of Ur (or Ur III) in 2004 BC, Mesopotamia had been divided among several kingdoms ruled by Amorite dynasties. In the south, the most powerful were first Isin, then Larsa, which attempted to carry on the tradition of the kings of Ur, but without imposing their hegemony.

Babylon was then merely a secondary city, situated away from the major centers and lacking a notable history, where an Amorite dynasty took root around 1880 with the accession of Sumu-la-El (1880–1845). He succeeded in carving out a kingdom that dominated several important neighboring cities (Borsippa, Kish, Kutha, Dilbat, Marad, Sippar). His successors consolidated the kingdom and thus emerged as increasingly serious rivals to Larsa.

Hammurabi succeeded his father, Sin-muballit, to the throne in 1792 BC. Larsa was in a position of strength during the early part of the long reign of Rim-Sin (1822-1763 BC), who succeeded in annexing the kingdoms of Isin and Uruk. Babylon was his most threatening direct rival for hegemony over southern Mesopotamia. In addition to this southern rival, Babylon had to contend on its northeastern border with the expansionist ambitions of the kingdom of Eshnunna, whose center was located in the Diyala River Valley. On the other hand, it enjoyed good relations with the strongman of northern Mesopotamia and rival of Eshnunna, Samsi-Addu (or Shamshi-Adad; 1815-1775 BC), a member of the same Amorite clan as the kings of Babylon. After spending some time as a refugee in Babylon following a period of unrest, he settled in the city of Ekallatum, on the Tigris, and within a few years established a powerful kingdom that historians refer to as the “Kingdom of Upper Mesopotamia.” As its name suggests, it dominated the entire northern part of Mesopotamia, notably incorporating the city of Assur and overshadowing the kings of the Khabur region; then, in 1792 BC, the powerful kingdom of Mari.

=== Early years ===
Hammurabi's date of birth is unknown, as is the age at which he ascended the throne. Given the length of his reign (43 years), he may have been very young at the time, although it is also possible that he was already in his twenties or even thirties.

The first two decades of his reign are poorly documented. Hammurabi's date of birth is unknown, as is the age at which he ascended the throne. The names given to the early years of his reign primarily refer to public works and offerings to deities. His seventh year commemorates a military victory, the capture of Isin and Uruk, territories held by Larsa, but this was clearly a short-lived raid, as both cities remained under Larsean control. His tenth year commemorates a victory over Malgium, located east of Babylon, with the support of Samsi-Addu and the king of Eshnunna; but that city remained independent.

The death of Samsi-Addu in 1775 BC was followed by the rapid disintegration of his kingdom and a struggle for dominance in Northern Mesopotamia. This competition primarily involved Eshnunna and the new king of Mari, Zimri-Lim, with whom Hammurabi ultimately formed an alliance.

=== The war against Elam ===
It is from this point on that the letters unearthed at Mari provide a relatively detailed account of international relations, including those of Babylon. The kingdom of Elam, whose heartland lies in the southwest of present-day Iran (notably at Susa), and which controlled major trade routes crossing the Iranian Plateau and the Zagros Mountains, decided to expand into the Mesopotamian plain. It sought to attack the first kingdom in its path, Eshnunna, and easily secured the support of various kingdoms hostile to Eshnunna, foremost among them Babylon and Mari. Elam attacked and subjugated the kingdom of Eshnunna. It established its rule over a significant portion of the Mesopotamian plain for the first time. But Elam did not wish to stop there, which ultimately led to war against Babylon, Mari, and several other kingdoms in southern and northern Mesopotamia, as well as Syria, which formed a coalition to stop it. The Elamites then played a double game, in order to sow discord between Rim-Sin of Larsa and Hammurabi of Babylon, just as these two eternal rivals were trying to reconcile. But the two kings uncovered the ruse, and ultimately formed an alliance, though the latter contributed little to nothing to the coalition. The Elamites, who were threatening the northern part of the Babylonian kingdom, were eventually repelled with great difficulty, thanks to the support of troops from Mari and other kingdoms of northern Mesopotamia.

=== Major conquests ===
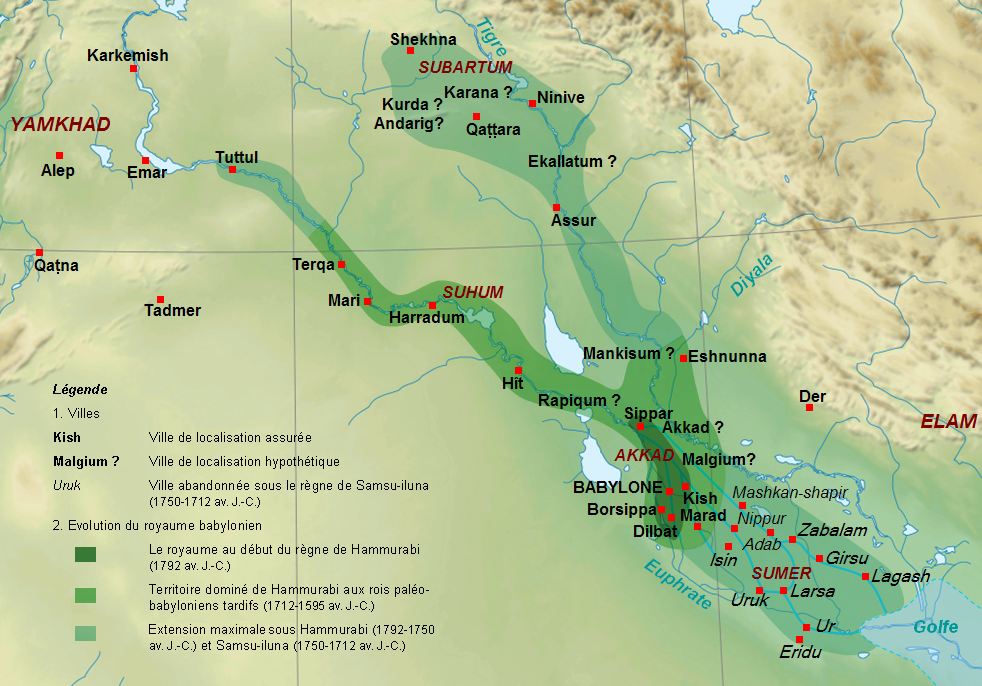
The expansion of the Babylonian kingdom during the reign of Hammurabi and his successors.

Bolstered by this triumph and his alliance with Mari, Hammurabi adopted a more ambitious stance. In the wake of the withdrawal of the Elamite troops from Eshnunna, he sought to bring that kingdom under his control. A letter from Mari indicates that he then had the option of either simply annexing the kingdom outright or installing a member of the local royal family as a puppet ruler (with the approval of the king of Mari). But the elites of Eshnunna made the unexpected choice to enthrone a section chief—that is, a mere commoner—named Silli-Sin. This led to a year of difficult negotiations between Babylon and Eshnunna to conclude a peace agreement.

At the same time, Hammurabi launched a lightning war against him with the help of Zimri-Lim of Mari, citing Rim-Sin’s meager support provided against Elam and his alleged attacks by his troops on his territory, and also taking advantage of the weakening of his kingdom. He annexed his kingdom in 1763 BC. He thus gained control of the entire lower Mesopotamian plain. This was a major turning point in the history of the period, as Hammurabi succeeded where many kings had failed before him for more than two centuries. The fall of the Kingdom of Larsa is recounted in several letters from Mari soldiers addressed to their king, including this one, written as the final assault was imminent and then carried out:

Regarding the besieged city of Larsa, I have already written to my lord: “All the refugees who now fall into our hands say, ‘There is no more grain in the city,’” when in fact there is grain, but without their knowledge. Instead of grain, they are receiving straw, bran, and chaff… […] After the arrival of reinforcements, the Babylonian troops entered [Larsa] and seized the walls. This morning, all the men entered. As for Rim-Sin, they brought him out alive.

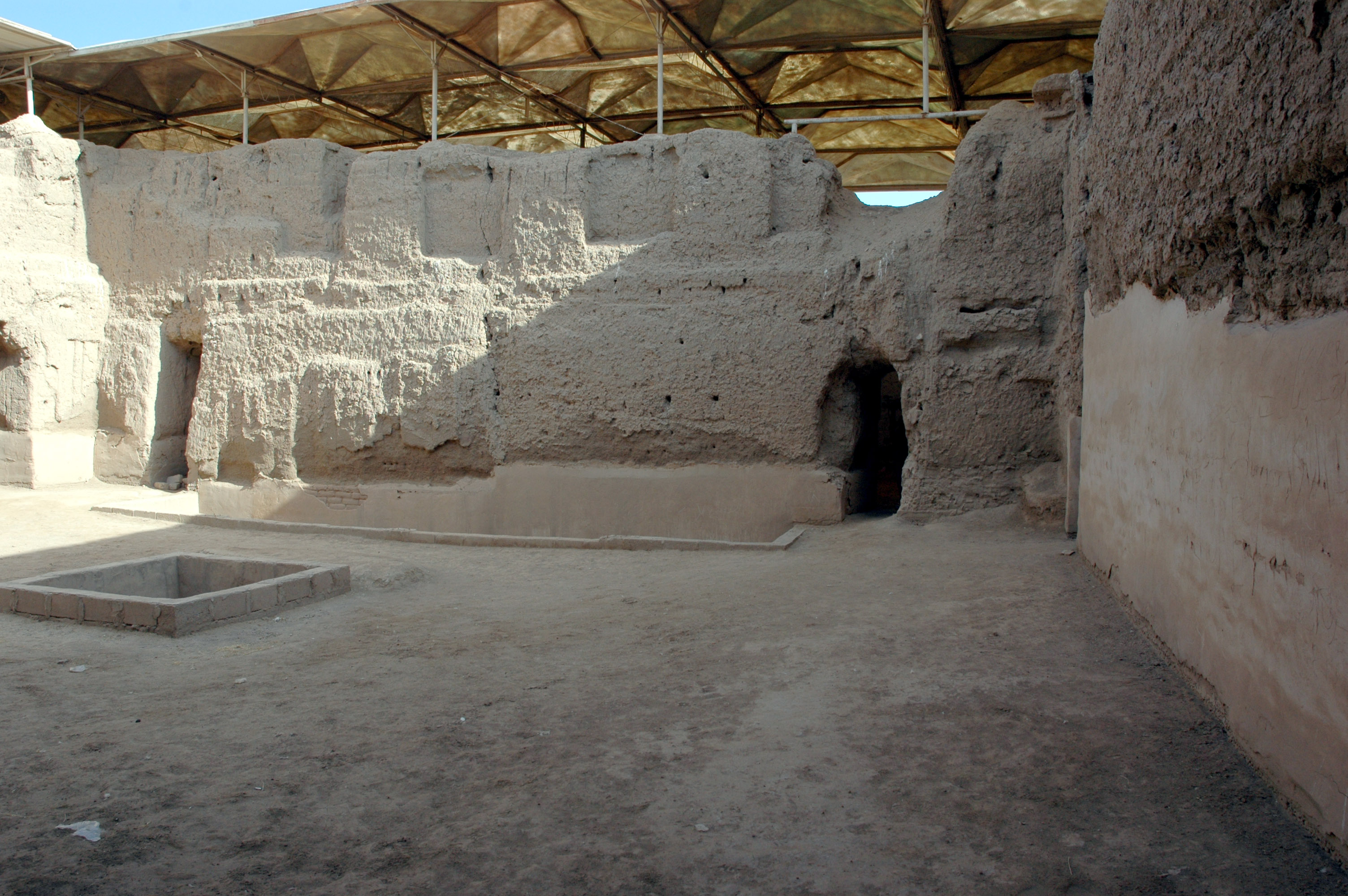
The ruins of the Royal Palace of Mari, destroyed by Babylonian troops.

Continuing his expansion, Hammurabi turned his attention northward. He had resolved to form an alliance with Eshnunna immediately after his victory over Larsa, and one of his daughters had married its king Silli-Sin. However, shortly thereafter, he won a victory over Eshnunna, commemorated by the name given to his 32nd regnal year, which indicates that other neighboring entities (Shubartum and Gutium) were also defeated. The exact circumstances that triggered this conflict remain unknown, as does the fate of the defeated kingdom.

He then went to war against the region’s other major power, his former ally Zimri-Lim of Mari. The rift between the two appears to have occurred rapidly, due to Hammurabi’s ambitions in the Jebel Sinjar region, which was under Mari’s influence. As a result, Zimri-Lim does not appear to have supported him in his conflict against Eshnunna; on the contrary, he seemed to favor his adversary. The course of the conflict is not documented, but the outcome is clear: Mari was captured and then destroyed between 1761 BC and 1759 BC. Malgium suffered a similar fate during those same years.

This led to the end of the Mari archives, and the military history for the remainder of Hammurabi's reign is poorly documented. The king's year names provide insight into the events deemed most significant by the Babylonian chancery during the final decade of Hammurabi's reign. Part of the name for the 33rd year (which primarily refers to the digging of a long canal in the southern part of the kingdom) recounts Hammurabi's new military successes:

The year: Hammu-rabi, the king, […] restored Sumer and Akkad which had been scattered; overthrew in battle the army of Mari and Malgium; subjugated Mari and its villages and the many cities (of the mountain land) of Subartu, (Ekallatum, (all of) Burunda and the land of Zalmaqum on the bank of the Tigris up to the Euphrates); and caused <them> to dwell at his command in friendship.

Hammurabi subsequently consolidated his hold on the north, where he defeated a coalition of kings, including those of Shubartum, Turukkum, and Gutium (Year Name 37), and then deported people from the conquered lands. In the process, he established his rule over the city of Assur. The name of Year 39 commemorates another victory in Shubartum.

According to D. Charpin, the last major potential rival in his neighborhood that had remained independent, Eshnunna, already greatly weakened, appears to have suffered destruction due to floods (mentioned in the name of the year 38) and a shift in the course of the Diyala River, which led to its abandonment. During those years, Hammurabi primarily commemorated several major construction projects, some of which may have been intended to prevent flooding.

=== Final years ===
Within a few years, Hammurabi had thus succeeded in uniting Mesopotamia under his rule. One can therefore speak of an “empire”.

The prologue to the Code of Hammurabi, dated to the end of Hammurabi’s reign, includes a list of major cities under Babylonian control at that time, which is often used to illustrate the extent of the kingdom after this ruler’s forty-year reign. Its logic is largely religious, as it first lists city-deity pairs arranged according to a politico-theological objective: first, the deities who bestowed kingship—Enlil of Nippur, Ea of Eridu, and Marduk of Babylon; then the celestial deities Sîn of Ur, Shamash of Sippar and Larsa, An and Ishtar of Uruk. The rest follow a more geographical order: cities of central Babylonia (Isin, Kish, Kutha, Borsippa, Dilbat, Kesh), then cities along the Tigris (Lagash-Girsu, Zabalam, Karkar, Adab, Mashkan-shapir, Malgium), and finally the major cities of northern Mesopotamia that Hammurabi conquered toward the end of his reign, namely Mari, Tuttul, Eshnunna, Akkad, Assur, and Nineveh.

Hammurabi died around 1750 BC, in the forty-third year of his reign. His son Samsu-iluna succeeded him. One text allows us to date the change of reign fairly precisely within the Babylonian calendar, on the tenth day of the fifth month of the year.

It appears that Hammurabi died of illness, or perhaps of old age, following a period during which he was physically weakened, beginning in his fortieth year of reign. R. Pientka-Hinz has suggested interpreting the commemorative works associated with his 40th year, carried out at the sanctuary of Nergal, god of the Underworld, as an indication that he was already ill at that time and that, sensing his end was near, he wished to curry favor with the lord of the afterlife, who would soon welcome him.

A letter from his son Samsu-iluna addressed to the governor of Sippar and dated to the final moments of his reign seems to indicate that Hammurabi was seriously ill at that time and that his death was imminent, but a break in the tablet prevents the sentence from being fully reconstructed. In any case, his son appears to have been ruling the kingdom at that time (perhaps as regent) and preparing for his own accession to the throne by remitting debts owed to servants of the crown, soldiers, and private citizens (muškēnum), measures typically taken upon the ascension of a new monarch. He also summoned the governor and the Elders, local political authorities, from his province to the capital.

== Family ==
Hammurabi's family is very poorly known.

None of his wives are documented, but based on the customs of his time, he must have had at least one (or even two) principal wife(s), secondary wives, and numerous concubines, with a harem, which was enlarged, notably following his military conquests.

One of Hammurabi's sisters is known: Iltani, who became a nun (nadītum) devoted to the god Shamash at Sippar, a common practice among royal families of the time, serving to strengthen the bonds between kings and the gods. None of his brothers are known, but a text from Larsa seems to mention an unnamed "daughter of the king's brother," therefore a niece of a brother, perhaps who became a priestess of the god Shamash in that city. From known examples in other kingdoms of his time, the sovereign's brothers were often involved at the highest level in the affairs of the kingdom.

Two of his sons are attested in the archives of Mari: Sumu-ditana (the eldest son?) and Mutu-Numaha, whose names referred to ancestors of his dynasty. They were both sent to Mari for a time as part of educational journeys, which appear to have been a custom at the time. They may also have served as hostages when the king of Mari was lending troops to Babylon. The son destined to succeed Hammurabi, Samsu-iluna, is not attested during his reign. It is not known whether he is the eldest of the siblings, as he was to proclaim in one of his own royal inscriptions.

Among his daughters, at least one in turn becomes a nun devoted to Shamash, perhaps called Lamassani, and another is married to the king Silli-Sin of Eshnunna.

== Government ==
=== Ideology of kingship ===
Toward the end of his reign, the prologue to the Code of Hammurabi extols the greatness of the ruler, who had reached the height of his glory following his great conquests. It notably encompasses the two aspects of Mesopotamian royal legitimacy: divine election, particularly through references to the deities who bestow sovereignty (Enlil, Marduk, Ishtar); and descent from a royal dynasty, through reference to the founder of Hammurabi’s dynasty, Sumu-la-El (1880–1845), and to his father and immediate predecessor, Sin-muballit (1812–1793 BC)..

I am Hammurabi, the shepherd, selected by the god Enlil, he who heaps abundance and plenty, who perfects every possible thing for the city Nippur, (the city known as) bond-of-heaven-and-earth, the pious provider of the Ekur temple; [...] the onslaught of the four regions of the world, who magnifies the reputation of the city Babylon, who gladdens the heart of his divine lord Marduk, whose days are devoted to the Esagil temple; [...]

the pious one, who prays ceaselessly for the great gods, scion of Sumu-la-El, mighty heir of Sin-muballit, eternal seed of royalty, mighty king, solar disk of the city of Babylon, who spreads light over the lands of Sumer and Akkad, king who makes the four regions obedient, favored of the goddess Ishtar, am I.

The official inscriptions celebrating Hammurabi emphasize his personal qualities—that he was a “strong king,” an “accomplished king,” and a “hero.” Hammurabi’s titles refer more simply to his status, which grew increasingly imposing as his conquests progressed: he was initially defined simply as “king of Babylon,” and after the conquest of Larsa and his assumption of control over all of southern Mesopotamia, he adopted the prestigious title of “king of the lands of Sumer and Akkad,” which had been borne by the kings of the Third Dynasty of Ur. After the conquest of Mari, he added “king of the entire Amorite land” to his titles, and by the end of his reign he was “king of the four regions/quarters” of the world—that is, he claimed universal dominion.

Hammurabi even attained a form of divinization following the conquest of the Kingdom of Larsa and the incorporation of the ancient land of Sumer, where the tradition of divine kingship was more deeply rooted than in the region of Babylon. The king's name is sometimes written in cuneiform preceded by the sign indicating divine nature, and an inscription defines him as the "god of his land," while also noting his obedience and devotion to the great gods.

Several hymns in Sumerian, or in both Sumerian and Akkadian, focus on Hammurabi, singing the king's praises. They often take the form of hymns addressed to a deity (Enki, Asarluhi, Inanna) that conclude with a prayer for the king's well-being.

The subjects of the kingdom were expected to offer prayers and gifts to the gods and goddess so as to secure their protection and favor for the king, or, according to the established formula, “for his life.” This was, therefore, a way of demonstrating allegiance to the king. Votive objects were also offered to the gods by the subjects of Babylon on behalf of their king: the Worshipper of Larsa, a statue bearing an inscription requesting the intercession of the god Amurrum on behalf of Hammurabi, as well as in a fragment of a sculpture likely from Sippar, which invokes the goddess Ashratum (Amurrum’s wife).

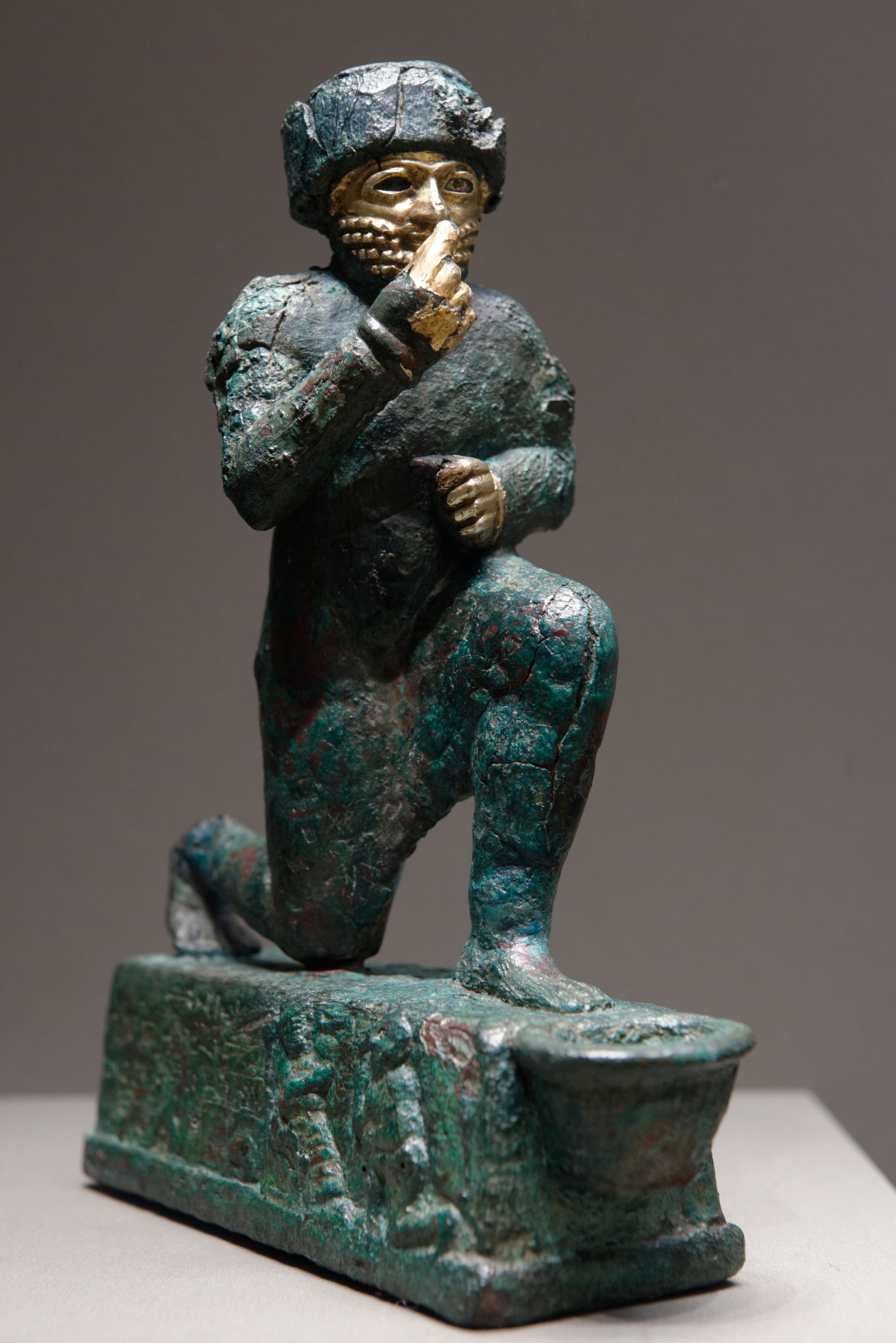
The "Worshipper of Larsa", a copper statuette of a man (likely the dedicator) in a posture of prayer, offered to the god Amurrum for the life of Hammurabi. Louvre Museum..

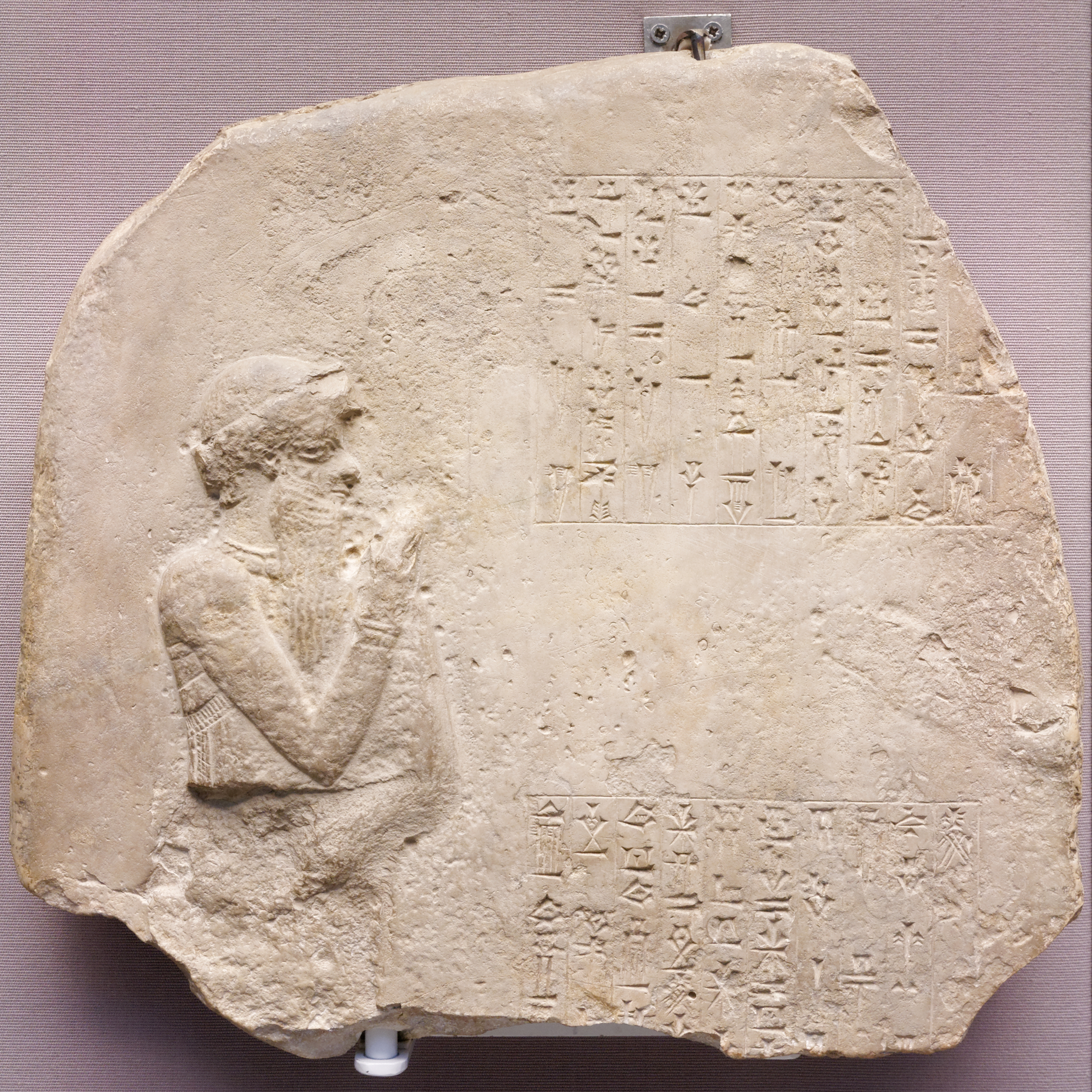
Fragment of a bas-relief dedicated to the goddess Ashratum for the life of Hammurabi. The figure depicted may be the king, or perhaps the dedicator Itur-Ashdum. British Museum.

=== Hammurabi's court ===
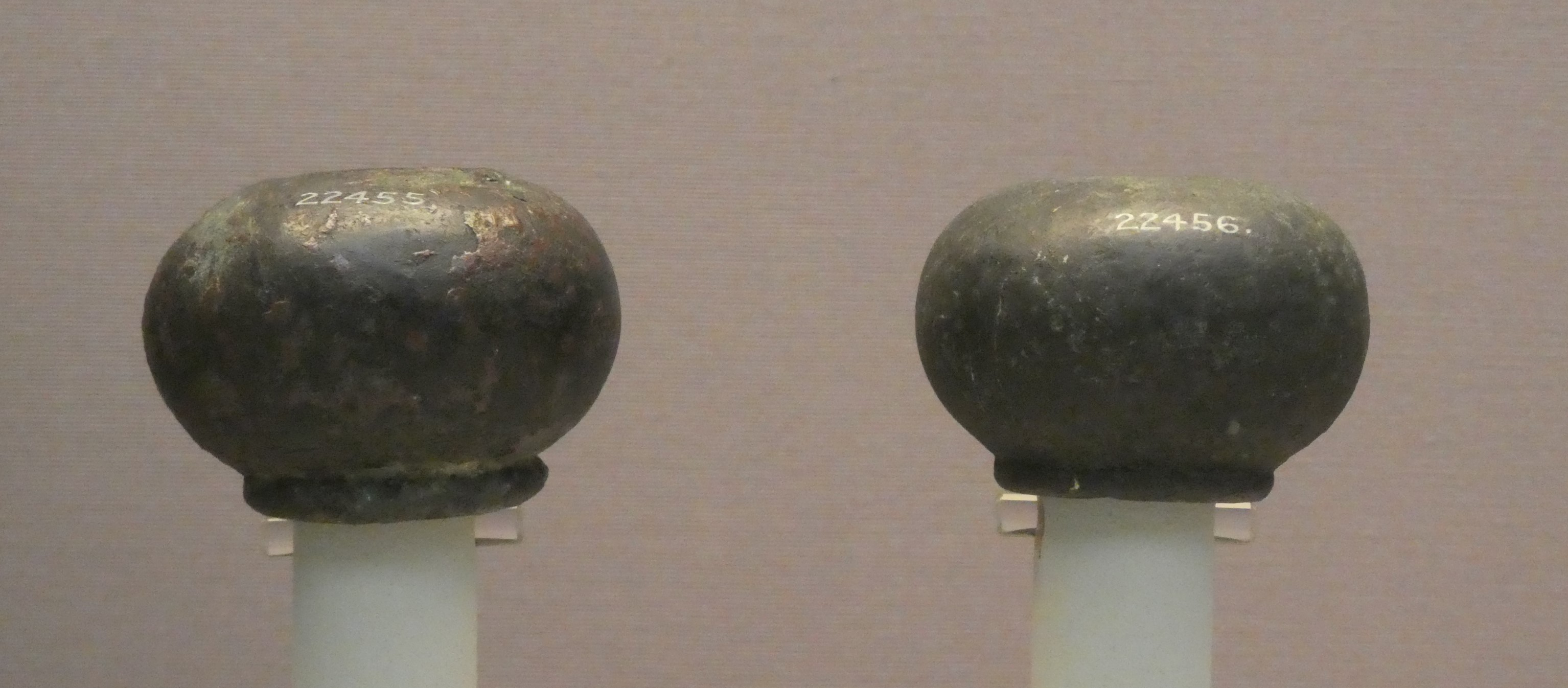
Pair of copper-alloy mace heads found at Tell Muhammad (Baghdad) bearing the inscription "Palace of Hammurabi." British Museum.

In principle, the king resides in a "palace" (ekallum), a term denoting not only the building itself but also the royal institution and its estates. While Hammurabi certainly had a palace in Babylon (which was not uncovered during excavations of the city), he also resided in other cities within his kingdom where he maintained provincial palaces, notably in the vicinity of Babylon (Sippar, Borsippa, Kish), and, following the conquest of Larsa, in the former royal palaces of the Amorite dynasties of Sumer (Larsa, Uruk, Isin). A palace of Hammurabi has been identified by an inscription at the site of Tell Muhammad (near Baghdad), within the territories seized from Eshnunna.

Hammurabi governed while surrounded by figures akin to "ministers." While each held a specific portfolio, they could also, depending on the king's will, carry out distinct, ad hoc assignments as needed. The Mari letters reveal two of Hammurabi's key ministers who held the title of šukkallum (often translated as "vizier"): Erra-nada and Sin-bel-aplim, the latter being specifically responsible for receiving foreign embassies. He also had private secretaries, responsible for his correspondence, who were privy to the highest levels of state secrets; letters from Mari identify Sin-iddinam (who later became governor of Larsa; see below) and Marduk-nasir as holders of this position. Other high-ranking figures with less clearly defined roles are attested in texts as belonging to Hammurabi's inner circle.

Seals also provide a valuable source for understanding the Babylonian administration: a cylinder seal and several cylinder seal impressions found on tablets bear inscriptions identifying individuals who describe themselves as "servant of Hammurabi," a designation generally interpreted as indicating that they were palace officials.

In any case, it appears that personal ties to the king were the primary factor in the selection of the ruling elite. The king made decisions with the support of a council, literally the "secret" (pirištum). He admitted whomever he chose to this body and could therefore alter its composition at will. A letter from Mari reveals that, during the war against Elam, Hammurabi brought three high-ranking officials who had served Ishme-Dagan of Ekallatum (son of Samsi-Addu) into his council; these men sidelined officials natives of Babylonia and held the privilege of learning the results of oracular consultations.

=== Major public works ===
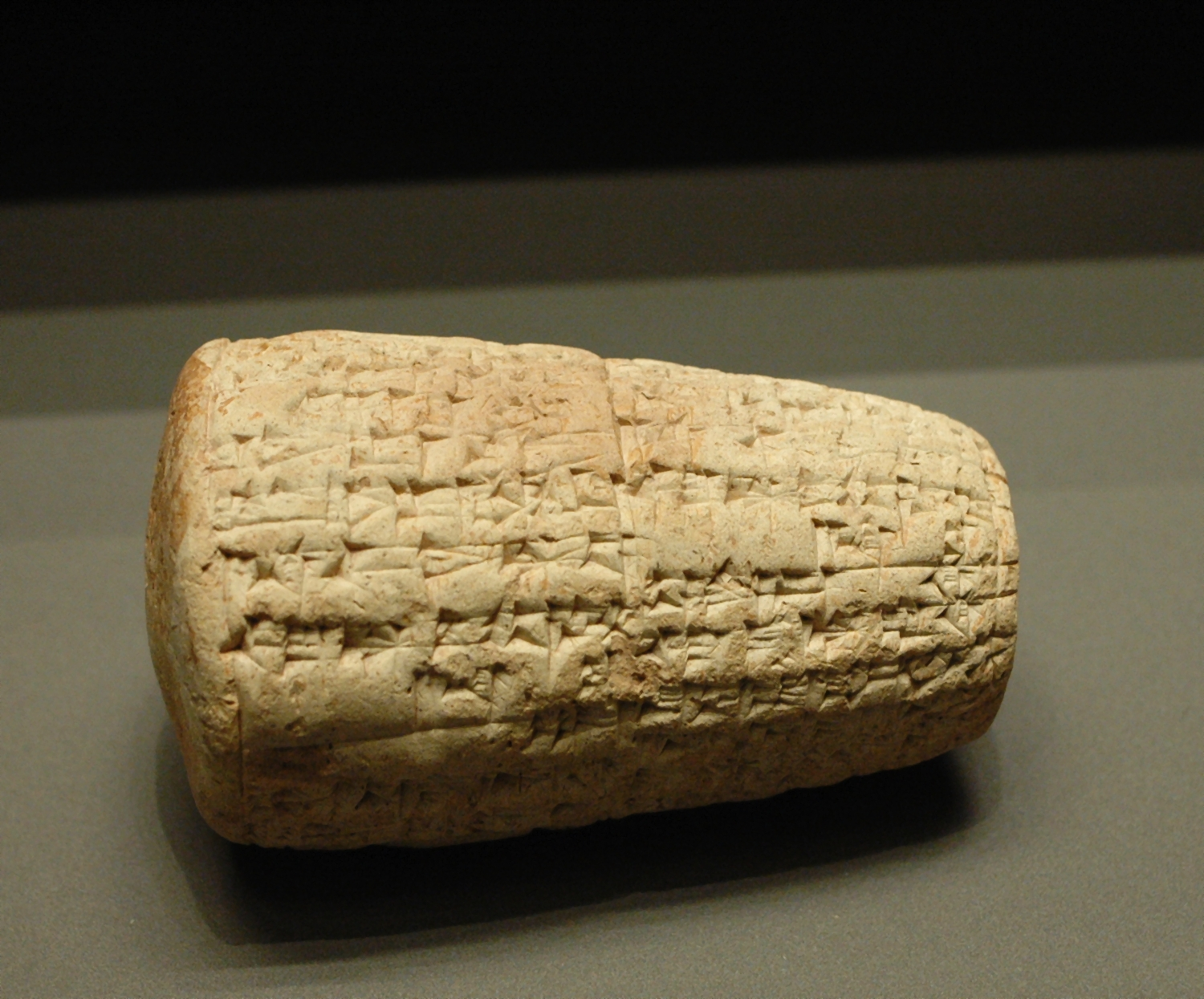
Clay cone documenting the construction of the wall of Sippar by Hammurabi. Louvre Museum.

Another essential characteristic of the Mesopotamian royal office that Hammurabi undertook was large-scale public works projects, which involved both the countryside and the cities.

The digging of canals for irrigation and transportation frequently appears in the regnal years of the kings of the Amorite period, and Hammurabi was no exception. Thus, the 33rd year of his reign commemorates the completion of a canal named in his honor, “Hammurabi (brings) abundance to the people” (in Akkadian Ḫammu-rabi nuḫuš nishī):

The year: Hammu-rabi, the king, dug the canal “Hammu-rabi (brings) abundance to the people, the beloved of (An) and Enlil”; provided perennial water of abundance for Nippur, Eridu, Ur, Larsa, Uruk and Isin; […]

This construction should be viewed in the context of the various projects undertaken in the territories of the former kingdom of Larsa following its conquest. As the canal’s name suggests, in royal ideology this reflects the ability of a good ruler to ensure the prosperity of his people. Two other year names, several commemorative inscriptions, and the prologue to the Code of Hammurabi mention similar undertakings.

Mesopotamian rulers also frequently undertook the construction or repair of city walls, thereby ensuring the protection of the people. Several of Hammurabi’s inscriptions refer to the reconstruction of the city walls of Sippar, which is also the subject of the name of the year Hammurabi 23. Once again, the structure bears a name in honor of the king, "By the decree of the god Shamash, may Hammurabi have no rival," invoking the protection granted to him by the local god.

=== Larsa after its conquest ===
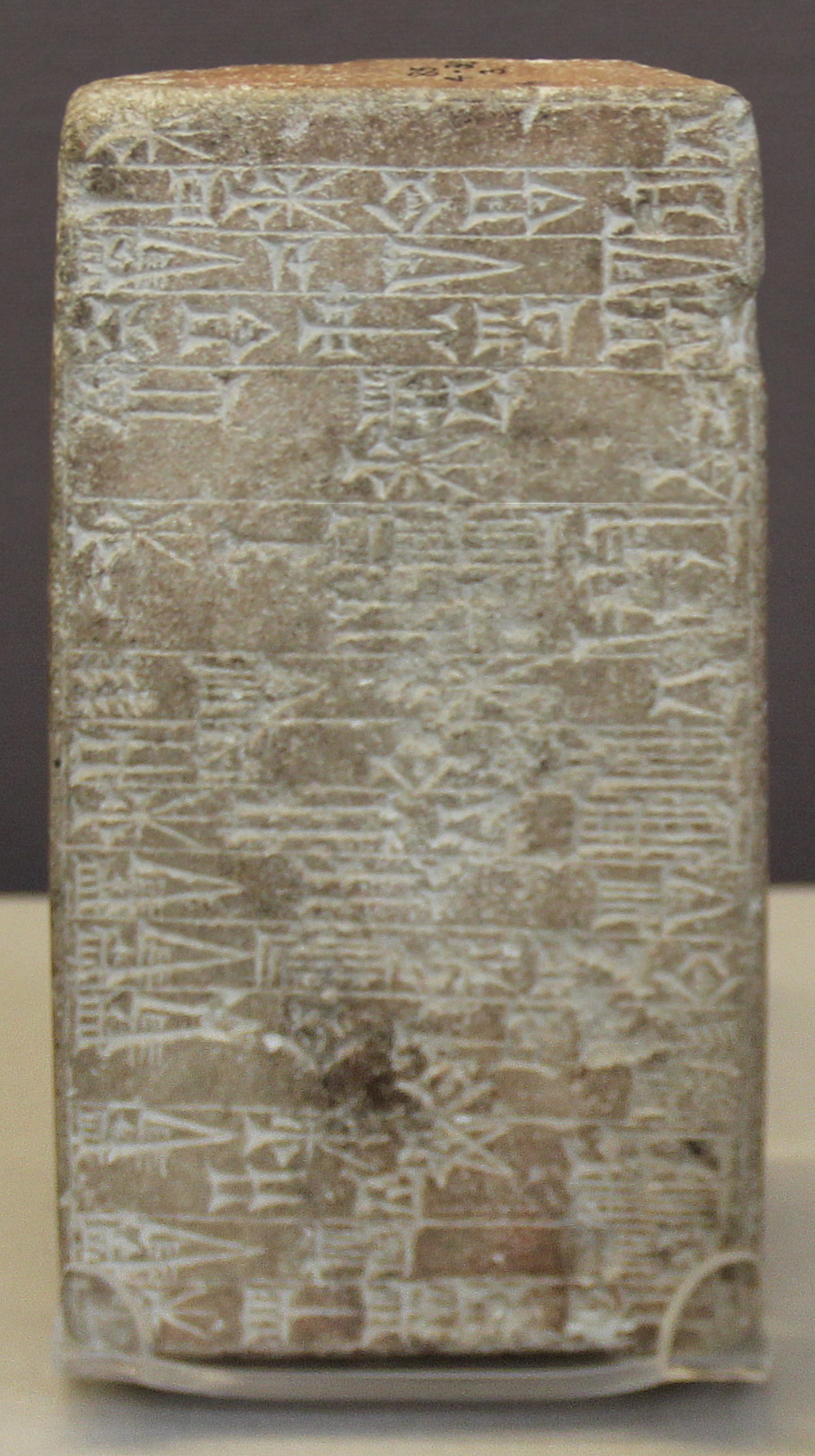
Foundation inscription in Sumerian commemorating the restoration of the temple of the sun-god Shamash at Larsa by Hammurabi. British Museum.

Hammurabi's administrative actions are primarily documented by a corpus of over 200 letters found at Larsa that he addressed to subordinates stationed in the city. Their exact provenance is unknown, as they come from illicit excavations carried out in the early 20th century.

Following the conquest of the kingdom in 1764/63 BC, its royal domain was incorporated into Hammurabi's, and its resources were subsequently redirected to Babylon at the sovereign's behest.. However, there appear to have been no significant land confiscations at that time; landholders generally remained the same as before. The province of the city of Larsa was entrusted to a certain Sin-iddinam, who oversaw the transition from Larsa's control to Babylonian rule, specifically by enforcing Babylonian law in place of the traditional law of the region. The approximately one hundred letters addressed to him by Hammurabi cover a variety of subjects: the management of the irrigation system and military troops, tax collection, the organization of corvée labor and the workforce, the shipment of goods and animals to Babylon, various legal matters, and even police activities. For instance, in the following letter, Hammurabi asks him to handle a case of corruption:

Shumman-la-ilum told me this: “A case of bribery occurred in Bad-tibira. There are men who took bribes and witnesses who know about it.” That is what he told me. I am sending you Shumman-la-ilum with a mounted messenger and a soldier. As soon as you read this tablet, investigate the matter. If there was indeed bribery, put a seal on the silver and all that was taken as bribes, and send it to me. Also send me the men who took the bribes and the witnesses who know about it, whom Shumman-la-ilum will identify.

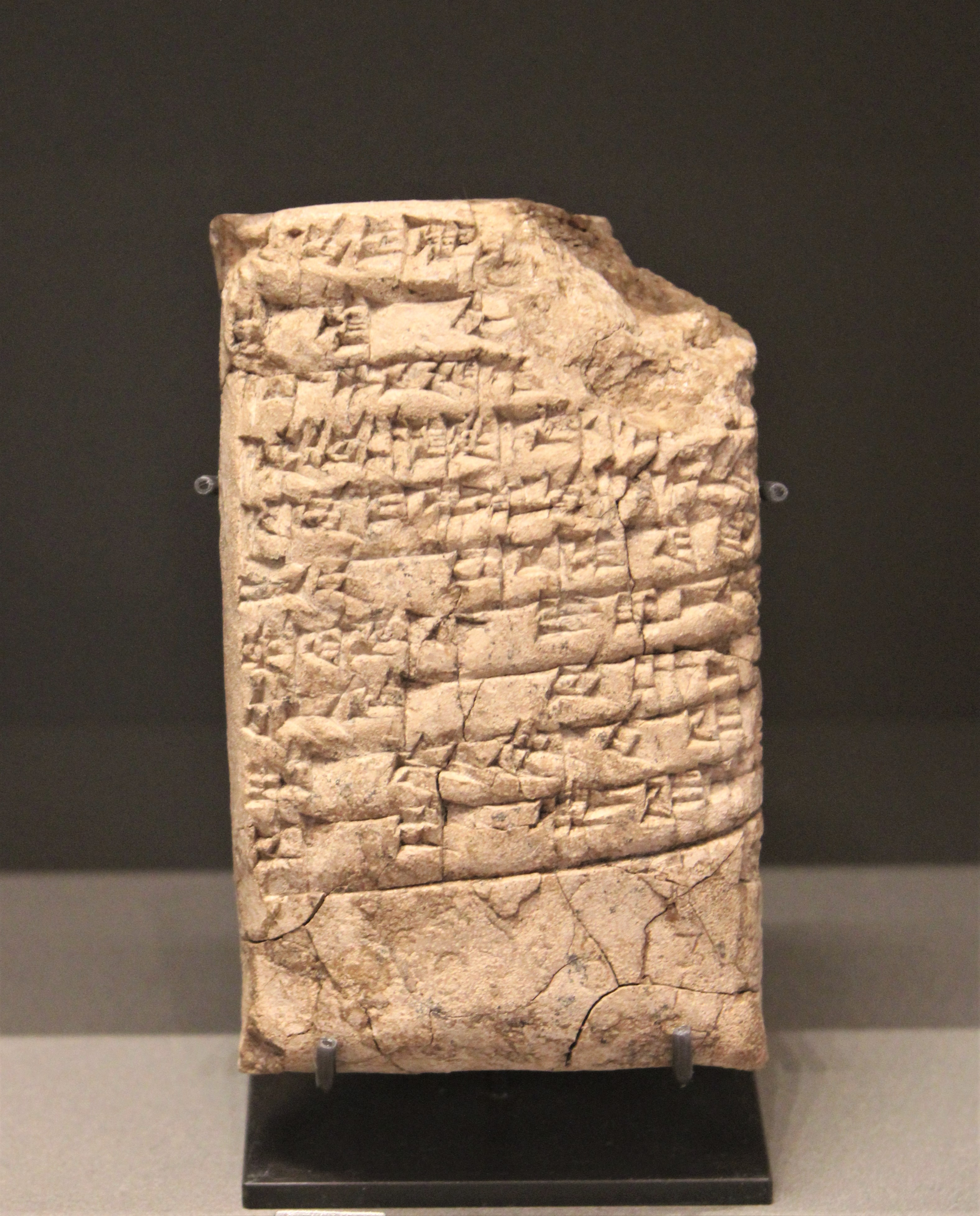
Letter from Hammurabi to Shamash-hazir, instructing him to allocate crown land to an individual. Louvre Museum.

The other primary recipient of the letters from Hammurabi discovered at Larsa was Shamash-hazir, the "head of the land registry" and administrator of palace estates in the Larsa region. The letters addressed to him deal primarily with the allocation of service lands (ilkum), which were granted to individuals in exchange for services rendered to the crown (military, crafts, etc.). These allocations frequently gave rise to disputes, as the lands were often appropriated by unauthorized parties, necessitating field investigations conducted by Shamash-hazir himself.

Correspondence sent by Hammurabi to his administrators reveals that the king often involved himself personally and directly in provincial affairs. He was frequently petitioned by his subjects regarding legal disputes and issues concerning land allocation, and he would order his subordinates to investigate and report back to him in detail. It mattered little to him whether the matter was significant or not.

The annexation of Larsa also appears to have had a significant cultural impact on the Kingdom of Babylon, resulting from the integration of members of the former kingdom's educated elite, particularly those versed in Sumerian texts. This is notably evident in royal inscriptions, which were composed in Sumerian following the conquest of Larsa, whereas they had previously been in Akkadian. This influx appears to have profoundly influenced the political and religious ideology, literature, religious practice, and statecraft of the Babylonian kingdom, which had previously held a somewhat secondary cultural position.

=== Divine cults ===
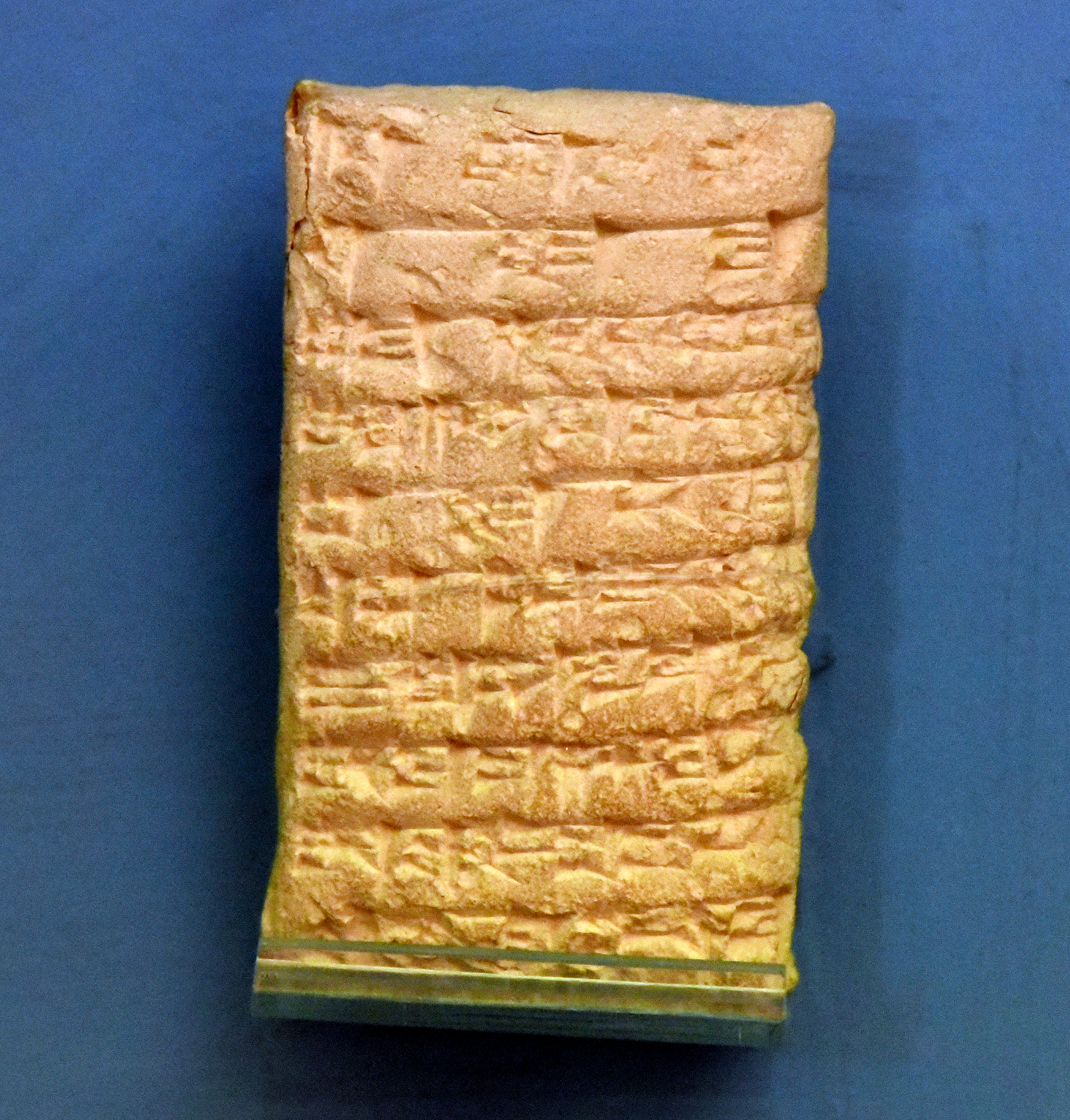
Letter written by Hammurabi to the governor of Larsa, Sin-iddinam, regarding the relocation of statues of goddesses. Istanbul Museum of the Ancient Orient.

As the chosen one of the gods, Hammurabi must also ensure that the worship of the gods proceeds smoothly; in turn, they guaranteed the prosperity of his kingdom. Consequently, the construction or restoration of sanctuaries features prominently in commemorative texts. For instance, the reconstruction of the ziggurat (a stepped tower) at the sanctuary of the warrior god Zababa in Kish (where the goddess Inanna/Ishtar was also venerated) is commemorated by several inscriptions in two variants (the longer of which is translated here) and by a year name (Hammurabi 36).

Furthermore, several of his year names commemorate votive offerings, such as the fourteenth year: "Year in which Hammu rabi the king made for Inanna of Babylon a magnificent throne dais, adorned with gold, silver, eye-hulalu-stone, muszszaru-stone and lapis-lazuli flashing like rays and made her chariot complete in everything."

A few letters from Larsa also document concerns regarding cultic matters: the organization of the transport of statues of goddesses, and the collection of silver for a temple.

A sister and a daughter of Hammurabi were also nadītum priestesses dedicated to another major deity, Shamash of Sippar, yet another manifestation of the ties between the king and the gods, which is part of an older tradition of strong ties between the Babylonian dynasty and the great sanctuary of Sippar.

The king consulted the gods through divination. This could involve the appointment of an official, the advisability of an alliance, or, quite frequently, military matters, and more generally, anything concerning the kingdom and the king. The most common form of divination practiced at the royal courts of this period was hepatoscopy, divination using the liver of a lamb, a practice best attested in the archives of Mari. A tablet dating to the 1st millennium BC records several oracular consultations from the reign of Hammurabi regarding military campaigns, notably the capture of the city of Kazallu. Despite the late date of the tablet itself, its authenticity appears to be established. An instance of prophecy at the Babylonian court is also attested in a letter from Mari: a prophet of the god Marduk appeared at the palace gate to berate Ishme-Dagan of Ekallatum, who was present there, accusing him of preferring to hand over his possessions to the king of Elam rather than consecrating them to the god.

== Justice and law ==
=== The king of justice ===
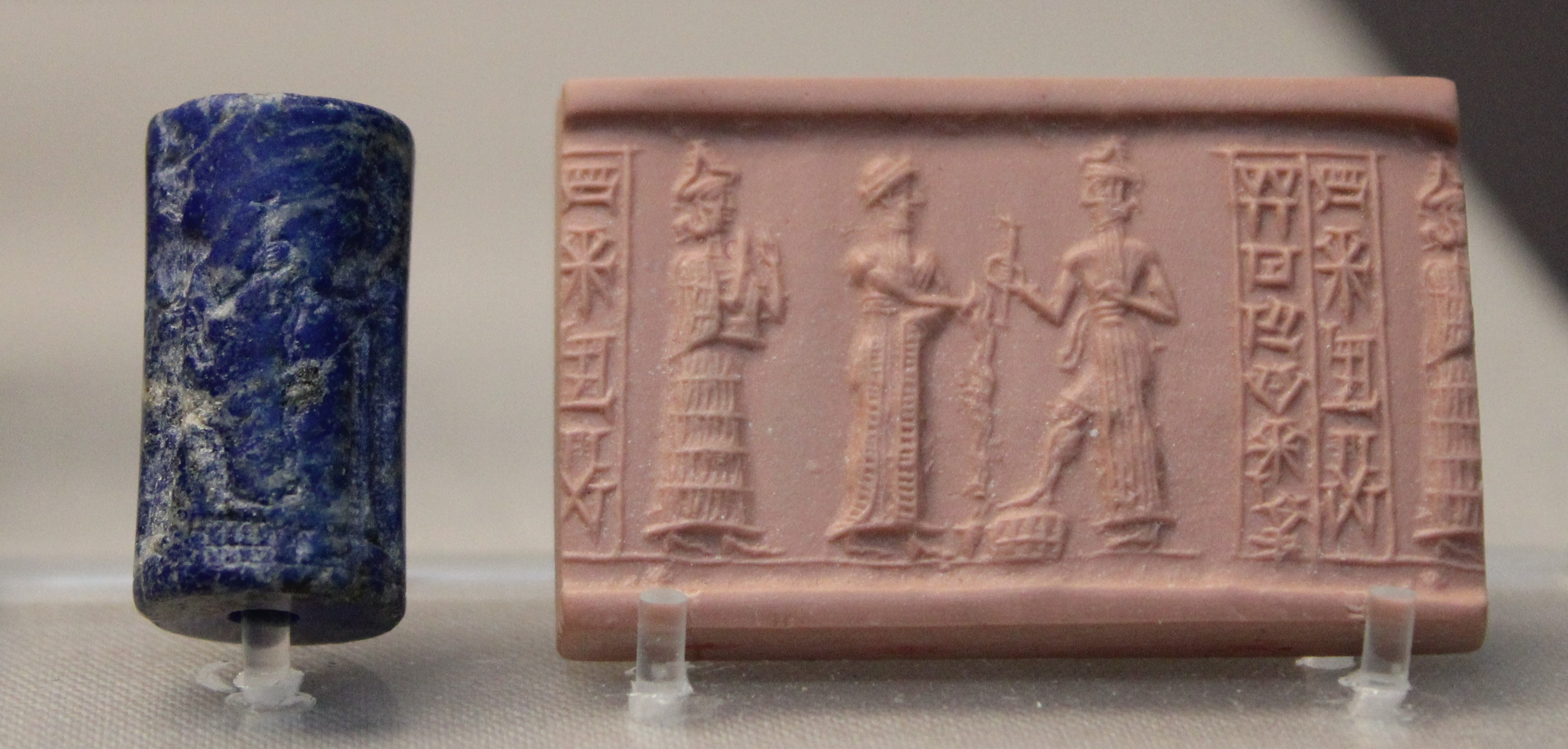
Cylinder seal with impression, depicting a king pouring a libation before the sun god Shamash, the deity who guarantees justice, holding the ring and staff symbolizing equity. Ur, ca. 1900 BC. British Museum.

The ideal Mesopotamian king's role is to administer justice and protect the weak against the powerful. In the case of Hammurabi, this is eloquently illustrated in his famous Code of Hammurabi. The top of the stele depicts the king facing the sun god Shamash, the deity of justice, who inspires the judgments he passes and which are recorded on the stele. The monarch is presented in the stele's epilogue as a recourse against injustices, including those arising from the routine administration of justice. Several laws of the Code of Hammurabi deal with the probity of judges, which again refers to the role of the king as guarantor of justice and protector of those subject to the law. The king is also invoked in the oaths taken during trials, alongside deities.

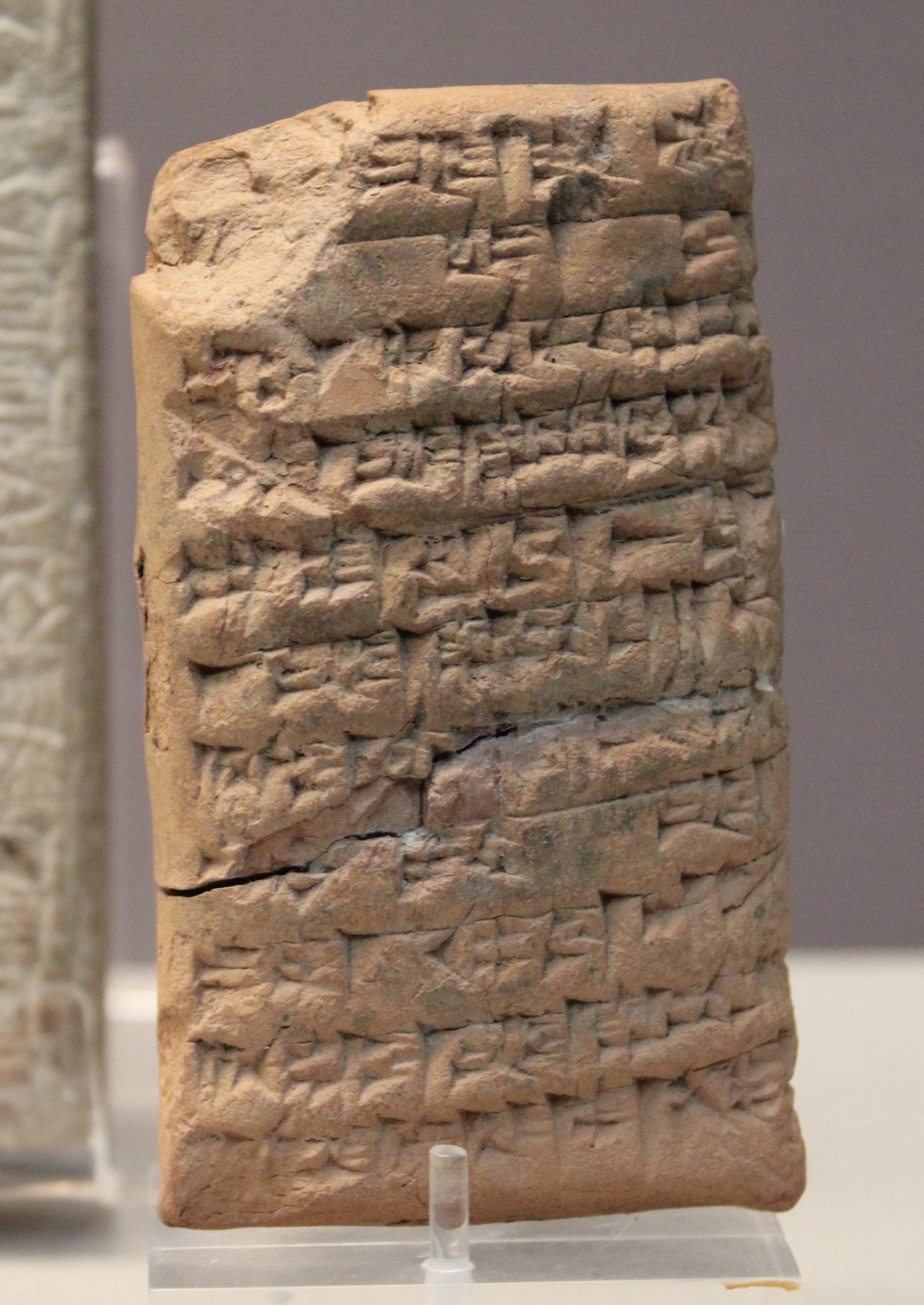
Letter from Hammurabi to Sin-iddinam, ordering men to come to Babylon so that he can judge a case. British Museum.

In practice, the king could intervene directly in the judicial life of his kingdom. The letters from Larsa thus indicate that he was involved in matters concerning the royal domain, and more generally its administration. Governor Sin-iddinam was often called upon to find witnesses and evidence so that the king could make a decision. Hammurabi intervened at the request of those involved in the case, and the matter could then be decided in different ways: either the king himself rendered the verdict; either the king issues a ruling on a point of law, which the local judges then enforce; or he refers the case back to the local judges, requesting to be kept informed of its progress. Letters from Larsa indicate that the king is not necessarily the one who passes judgments in Babylon, since in several cases this task falls to a certain Awil-Ninurta, perhaps a "minister".

The king also has a role in social justice, that is, a responsibility to ensure fairness. He is expected to put an end to situations of glaring inequality—particularly during economic crises—by issuing edicts of debt remission known as andurarum and mišarum (which appear to have primarily targeted loans for necessities, not commercial loans). Hammurabi issued one during his first year of reign (1792/1791 BCE) and commemorated this in the name of his second year of reign, “Year in which King Hammurabi established law and justice in his land.” He then promulgated another one in the land of Larsa after its conquest (1763 BC). This goal of "economic justice" is also reflected in various articles of the Code of Hammurabi, which specify prices for various types of services; these appear to correspond to the idea of a “fair price”—a threshold below which the situation was considered unjust for the person being paid.

=== The Code of Hammurabi ===
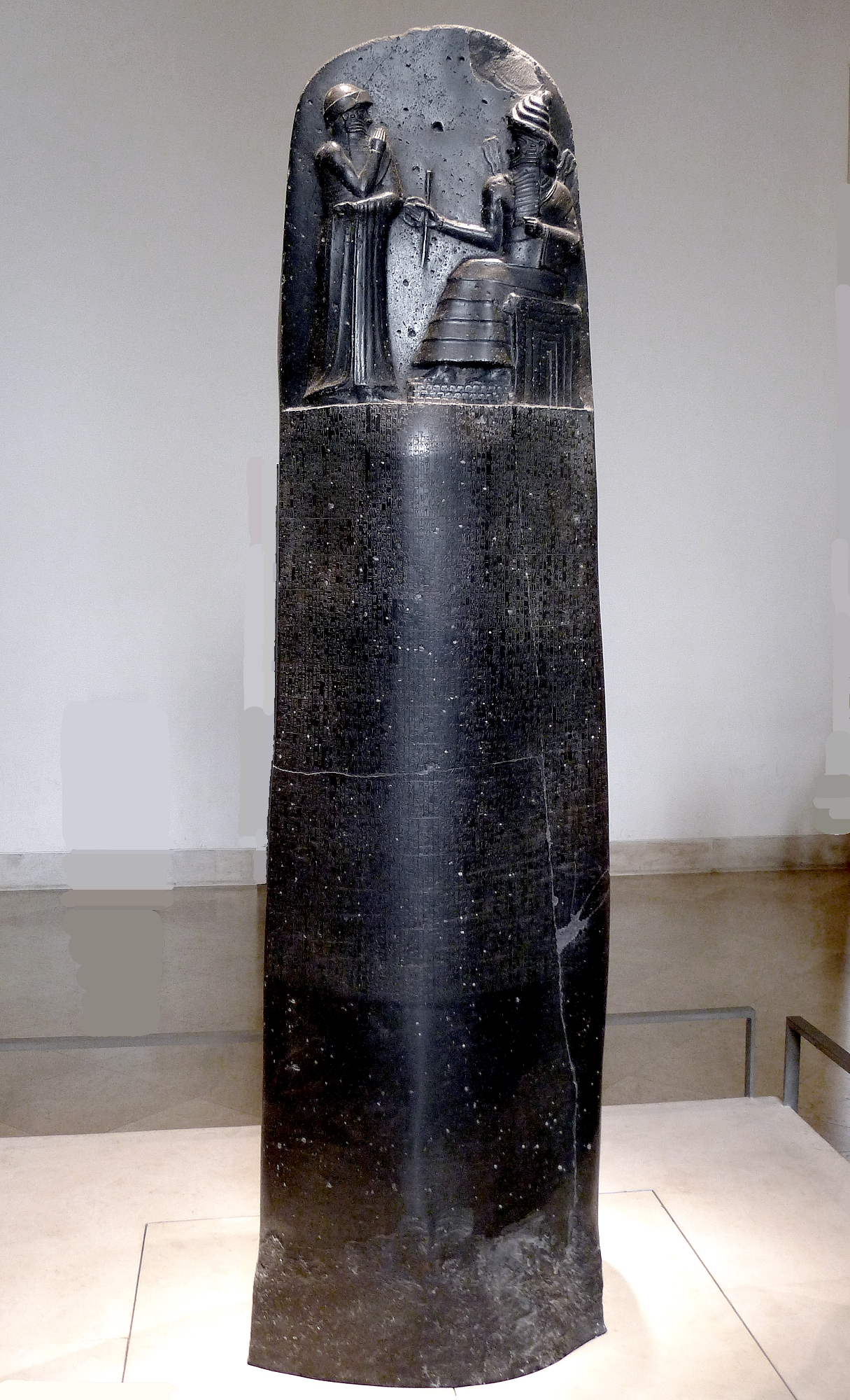
Front face of the stele of the Code of Hammurabi. Louvre Museum. It was probably originally housed in a temple (that of the god Shamash at Sippar?), then it was taken in the mid-12th century to Susa (Iran) as war booty, where it was unearthed in several fragments by French archaeologists between 1901 and 1902.

The Code of Hammurabi derives directly from this function of the king as guardian of justice and equity. It is divided into three parts: a prologue, a set of law provisions, and an epilogue. Written towards the end of Hammurabi's reign and known primarily from a large stela on which it was inscribed (tablets also document parts of the text), its status is debated. This is certainly not the only known Mesopotamian legislative collection, nor the oldest, but it is the longest known. In many respects, especially as expressed in the prologue and epilogue, it presents itself as a commemorative inscription celebrating Hammurabi's sense of justice and intended to preserve his memory for posterity.

These are the just decisions which Hammurabi, the able king, has established and therevy has directed the land along the course of truth and the correct way of life. [...] In order that the mighty not wrong the weak, to provide just ways for the waif and the widow, I have inscribed my precious prononcements upon my stela and set it up before the statue of me, the king of justice, in the city of Babylon [...] Let any wronged man whi has a lawsuit come before the statue of me, the king of justice, and let him have my inscribed stela read aloud to him, thus may he hear my precious prononcements and let my stela reveal the lawsuit for him; may he examine his case, may he calm his (troubled) heart [...]

The "laws" are thus a manifestation of the qualities of the just king. Divided by modern historians into 282 "law provisions" (or rules), they are arranged thematically, addressing various subjects: judicial practices, infringements on property rights, agrarian structures, financial matters, family law, assault and battery, provisions concerning various professions, and the ownership of slaves.

The nature and function of these laws are debated. Many see them as a scholarly and technical exercise, carried out by scribes, certainly based on the legal practices of the time, and therefore more a description of the law and a reflection on just decisions than prescriptions on the norms to be applied. It is possible that a number of these laws were written based on cases actually judged by Hammurabi. Some specialists believe that they may have served, at the very least, as examples, as models, for those who had to administer justice. However, without conclusive proof of their application in the judgments known from other cuneiform texts of the same period, they do not go further. But others do, analyzing them as a kind of rescript, general solutions derived from particular cases, which could (should?) indeed be applied by judges.

Hammurabi's legislative action may have aimed to modify and unify the various customs existing in the territories he brought under his control, at least in certain areas of greatest concern to the monarch, since the Laws does not cover all aspects of legal life, far from it. Moreover, these objectives remain largely theoretical. In general, the purpose of the laws seems to be at least to define the practices of a written law, with sealed tablets authenticable by witnesses; to establish obligations of social responsibility on the part of the kingdom's subjects; and to define the role of local institutions in relation to individuals by more strictly regulating their actions, particularly in the administration of justice, perhaps to weaken them.

== War and diplomacy ==
=== The king of war ===
War held an important place in the ideology of Mesopotamian kingship. According to the prevailing ideology of the time, the support of the gods was necessary for victory, and Hammurabi sought their advice through divination before undertaking a battle. A hymn for the king, formulated as an oracular text, urged him to take action and extend his kingdom and renown throughout the world, for he had received the approval of the major gods and goddesses.

But was Hammurabi a warlike king? His reign was marked by numerous conflicts, but his inscriptions do not portray him as a warmonger; on the contrary, he comes across as someone who is forced to take part in military conflicts, against his will. In any case, Hammurabi seems to have achieved his conquests primarily by seizing opportunities that presented themselves, without a pre-conceived imperialist project.

During wars, the king kept himself informed of the progress of operations, commanded the movements of the troops, and communicated with his allies. Some of the rare letters from Hammurabi found in Mari inform his ally Zimri-Lim and his subordinates of the latest news of the campaign against the Elamite army, so as to coordinate the actions of the coalition troops. It also seems that it was expected that the king would review his troops before battle, war being one of the main occasions during which a ruler was in contact with his people. A letter from Mari reports the speech delivered by Hammurabi to his soldiers before the assault on Mashkan-shapir, in which he proclaims that he is in the right when facing his enemy, Rim-Sin of Larsa, which has been confirmed by oracular consultations with Marduk and Shamash, and at the same time asks for clemency if the city capitulates:

“Now, the king of Larsa has outraged my land through repeated raids. Ever since the great gods have ripped out the claw of the Elamite ruler from this land and have rewarded the Larsa ruler with many benefits, he has not returned the(ir) favor. I have now appealed to Šamaš and Marduk and they have answered me positively. I would certainly not have risen to this attack without (consulting) God.”
To his troops [Hammurabi] said this, “Go and may God go before you. If on your arrival, the city opens (its gate) at your approach, accept its surrender. (Although Rim-Sin) has scorned an oath by Šamaš and Marduk, do not do harm to this city. If, however, the city does not open ... write to me.”

In the light of the numerous conflicts that marked Hammurabi's reign, it is hardly surprising that concerns about military resources (recruitment, financing of equipment, aid from allied kingdoms) appear repeatedly in the documentation. A large section of the Code of Hammurabi (§ 26-41) is devoted to the status of soldiers. They are divided into two categories: the rēdum, literally 'the one who follows', a kind of infantryman, and the bā'irum, literally 'fisherman', a soldier who patrols on boats (on waterways). Desertion is punishable by death. The Larsa tablets reflect the same concerns: military records indicate that after the annexation of the territory, Hammurabi ordered a census, seemingly intended to determine who could be mobilized for his army. Governor Sin-iddinam was regularly called upon to raise troops. Shamash-hazir, for his part, was responsible for allocating land from the royal domain to soldiers.

=== Diplomatic communications ===
Hammurabi was among the most powerful kings of his time, who dominated the international stage, alongside the kings of Mari, Yamhad (Aleppo), Qatna, Larsa, Eshnunna, and Elam (the latter apparently ranking even higher than the others, at least before his defeat). In the diplomatic vocabulary of the time, they regarded themselves as “brothers”, i.e. equals. In contrast, kings of secondary rank were their “sons,” and they were expected to regard them as their “fathers.”

Normal relations between royal courts involved the exchange of messengers representing a king, who would send them to the court of another ruler (there were no permanent embassies). They might be tasked with delivering the gifts that kings exchanged with one another, or even negotiations between the two courts. The letters report various royal audiences, sometimes marred by incidents, as in this case where the Mariotes sent at the Babylonian court complain of not being treated with the same deference as the representatives of the kingdom of Yamhad:

We entered to take a meal in Ḫammurabi’s presence, moving into the Palace Court. Just the three of us—Zimri-Addu, I, and Yarim-Addu—were provided with garments, whereas the Yamḫad (delegates) that entered with us were all outfitted. As all the Yamḫadians were outfitted but they did not outfit the attachés (ša sikkim), my lord’s servants, I told Sin-bel-aplim (Ḫammurabi’s chief-of-staff) on their behalf, “Why do you segregate us as if the brood of a sow? Whose servants are we, and whose servants are these attachés? We are all the servants [of the same king], so why would you pit the right against the left?” This is what I stressed to Sin-bel-aplim. While I was arguing with Sin-bel-aplim, my lord’s servants, the attachés, got angry and stormed out of the Palace Court. Hammurabi was told of the matter, and subsequently they were outfitted. Once they were outfitted, Ṭab-eli-matim and Sin-bel-aplim (summoned me) and told me (what) Hammurabi had said, “Since early morning, you keep obstructing me with provocative words. Do you now dictate to my palace about garment (distribution)? Whoever pleases me, I outfit; whoever does not, I don’t. I won’t come back (on this): I will not outfit messengers at banquets!” This is what Hammurabi told me; my lord should know this.

We know from other examples that Hammurabi treated foreign messengers according to the nature of his relations with their ruler: Elamite messengers were thus given small portions of food when the two countries were at war, but were treated more favorably once the Elamite troops had left Mesopotamia.

=== Alliances ===
Diplomatic agreements were commonplace in the Amorite Middle East, and the period of coalition formation against Elam saw several agreements negotiated and concluded by Hammurabi. The essential element of the alliance ritual was the taking of an oath, for which the two kings did not need to meet in person. Instead of a peace treaty, a protocol of oath containing the clauses of the agreement was drawn up and recited before divine symbols, accompanied by ritual gestures. A letter from Mari recounts the proceedings of the alliance between Hammurabi and Silli-Sin of Eshnunna. The negotiations concerning the diplomatic agreement between Hammurabi and Zimri-Lim against Elam are documented by several tablets. For a time, the dispute between the two kingdoms over the control of the city of Hit posed an obstacle, but it was set aside so as not to hinder the alliance. Then came issues related to the ritual gestures and timing of the oath-taking. One letter indicates that Hammurabi was alarmed by the severity of the curses included in the agreement, divine punishments meant to befall anyone who broke the contract. Another shows that the Babylonian king refused to commit on the 25th of the month, apparently a day considered unlucky for invoking the name of the moon god Sin, and instead took the oath three days later before his council. The oath protocol sworn by Hammurabi was preserved by his partner, Zimri-Lim, and found in the archives of Mari. Similarly, Hammurabi must have kept the oath protocol of Zimri-Lim in his own archives:

Swear by Šamaš of heaven! Swear by Addu of heaven! These are the gods that Hammurabi, son of Sin-muballiṭ, king of Babylon, invoked (when taking this oath)," “From now on, as long as I live, I shall indeed be enemy of Ṣiwa-palar-ḫuḫpak."

I shall not let my servants or my messengers mingle with his servants, and I shall not dispatch them to him. I shall not make peace with Ṣiwa-palar-ḫuḫpak without the approval of Zimri-Lim, king of Mari and the Tribal-land. If I plan to make peace with Ṣiwa-palar-ḫuḫpak, I shall certainly consult with Zimri-Lim, son of Yaḫdun-Lim, king of Mari and the Tribal-land. If it is not a peaceful situation, we shall make peace with Ṣiwa-palar-ḫuḫpak (only) jointly.

The oath sworn by my gods, Šamaš and Addu, to Zimri-Lim, son of Yaḫdun-Lim, king of Mari and the Tribal Land, I have bound and committed myself to him, joyfully and with complete sincerity..

Interdynastic marriages are another important aspect of diplomatic alliances. Regarding Hammurabi, only the marriage between one of his daughters and the king Silli-Sin of Eshnunna is known, which must take place when the alliance between the two was concluded.

== Personality and political skills ==
Letters from Mari, which are the only documents that depict Hammurabi through his daily actions and words, reveal him to be a skilled negotiator, reluctant to yield to the wishes of his allies, even when he needed their support. While he clearly commanded an effective army, he was also a shrewd diplomat. This is particularly evident in the negotiations surrounding the city of Hit, which was disputed between Babylon and Mari; these negotiations temporarily hindered an alliance between the two, despite the Elamite invasion, which directly threatened Babylon and in the face of which Babylon needed Mari’s support. The issue was left unresolved in order to allow the alliance to proceed. But this did not prevent Hammurabi from rejecting Mari’s demands and reiterating his claims to the city and their justification, namely, the fact that the city possessed the naphtha necessary for caulking ships, a crucial means of transportation in southern Mesopotamia due to its numerous waterways. This further highlights the Babylonian king's keen awareness of the importance of securing access to raw materials necessary for his country.

Hammurabi thus knows how to use his allies to his advantage, while giving them as little as possible, a fact that Mari learned the hard way. He also ensures that his status is respected and does not allow kings of lower rank to take advantage of him. For example, a letter recounts a tense audience between Hammurabi and emissaries from Ishme-Dagan of Ekallatum, a longtime ally and distant relative of Hammurabi. The exchange concerns various complaints by Ishme-Dagan, first regarding the fact that he had not received troops from Hammurabi—unlike other kings in northern Mesopotamia—despite the aid he had provided to Hammurabi in the past. This is followed by recriminations regarding Mari, which the messengers from Ekallatum apparently sought to gloss over. All of this provoked several outbursts of anger from Hammurabi:

Hammurabi answered them thus: “To whom have I given troops? Tell me, tell me!” Approaching them, he repeated his question five or six times, obliging them to answer: “You gave troops to Atamrum (a king of northern Mesopotamia)!” And Hammurabi answered them: “What troops did I give to Atamrum? It was a troop of 300 or 400 men (only) that I sent to Atamrum, and the troop […] (Gap).
Hammurabi replied: “Why are you withholding the rest of your report? Tell me your full report.” They said: “[…]”… He said: “Surely there is other news you carry.” They said, “No, [we have not concealed] a secret report that your servant (Ishme-Dagan) sent you. Do not force us: our lord is spread out beneath your feet like a rug. Even if there is another king who reveres you, he does not write such messages of submission to you.”
When Ishme-Dagan’s messengers said this, Hammurabi replied to them, “Since you do not wish to complete your report, let my servant who came with you complete it!” Hammurabi summoned his servant who had come with them and said to him, “Since they do not wish to complete the report they were charged with, it is your turn! You, complete their report!”
Hammurabi’s servant who had come with them [came]; after repeating the report delivered by the messengers of Ishme-Dagan, he added to it, saying: “Zimri-Lim, to whom you have me writing as a son, is he not my servant? He does not dwell on a high throne; therefore, I have not written exalted greetings.”
When he heard these words, Hammurabi cried out, “What a scandal!” The messengers of Ishme-Dagan denied this report. […]

We thus gain a rare glimpse into Hammurabi’s personality, which is portrayed here as hot-tempered, impatient, and threatening toward the envoys from Ekallatum, “a volatile and at times rather threatening personality,” according to K. Radner.

Beyond the image of a just king that he wished to project, Hammurabi caused widespread devastation during his conquests. For this reason, P. Michalowski points out that he can be viewed as a “tyrant.” On several occasions, Hammurabi ordered acts of destruction, such as the destruction of the palace at Mari, as well as the deportation of the defeated, as after the Mutiabal revolt. On the other hand, however, these were not unusual acts for his own time, and there is no indication that he was any more brutal than other kings of his era.

The letters addressed to his subordinates in Larsa portray him as a king deeply involved in the affairs of his realm and close to his subjects, according to M. Van De Mieroop: "Hammurabi’s management style was very direct and the letters indicate that anyone could turn to him when facing a problem. He either rendered a verdict and directed his officials to carry out his orders, or he asked them to investigate the matter further. Nothing seems to have been too trivial for his attention. He asked about small lots of land, single servants, and so on. Some scholars have seen this as a sign that he was a petty ruler, but that is a mistaken judgment. Hammurabi properly fulfilled his functions as king. He was there for his people and all were allowed to approach him. This created a personal bond between the king and his people."

According to P.-A. Beaulieu, this level of involvement may indicate that he sought to combat corruption and the formation of fiefdoms that would threaten the integrity of his state, which would then explain his success as a kingdom-builder.

Did Hammurabi intend to build an empire modeled on those of the Akkadian and Ur III dynasties? It is impossible to say for certain, but judging by the course of the conquests, the existence of a carefully crafted plan from the very beginning of his reign seems unlikely. According to D. Charpin, "it is likely that the empire was the result not so much of a deliberate policy as of the skillful exploitation of successive opportunities." The sequence of conquests gives the impression of a single, unplanned military campaign. The kingdom's expansion took place over just a few years, beginning with a defensive response to the Elamite invasion and continuing through a series of conflicts against major rival powers—all apparently without demobilizing his army.

At the very least, this credits Hammurabi with great political acumen and the ability to make the most of opportunities presented by the highly fluid international landscape of the time. According to P.-A. Beaulieu: "It is tempting for historians to explain retrospectively the success of Babylon by highlighting economic, geographic, or environmental conditions that would have made its rise inevitable. Such factors always play a role in history, but none should be considered decisive and Hammurabi must also receive some individual credit. A less capable and astute leader might easily have failed, letting other cities make their bid to unify Mesopotamia under a single administration."

== Legacy ==
=== Aftermath ===
Hammurabi's conquests were considerable: in just a few years, he eliminated the major kingdoms of Larsa, Mari, and Eshnunna. Babylon, at the beginning of his reign, was a kingdom with limited territory, facing numerous rivals. By his death, it was the dominant power in Mesopotamia, and the two other major powers of the Middle East, Yamhad (Aleppo) and Elam, being further away, were no longer a threat. Hammurabi's victories had the lasting consequence of disrupting the balance of power that had existed since the fall of the Third Dynasty of Ur, and which had allowed the Amorite dynasties to flourish.

After Hammurabi's death, his son and successor Samsu-iluna (1749-1712 BC) failed to preserve the empire he inherited: several revolts led to the loss of the southern part of the kingdom (the former territories of Larsa), which became depopulated, while his attempts to extend and strengthen Babylonian rule in the north did not achieve lasting success. Nevertheless, Hammurabi's dynasty survived for several more decades. The 17th century BC saw the following Babylonian kings maintain their control over the heart of the kingdom, however precariously. But their power declined inexorably in the face of the emergence of the First Sealand dynasty in the south, and Kassite dynasties in the north. Hammurabi's dynasty was brought to an end by a Hittite attack in 1595 BC.

Hammurabi's conquests and empire were therefore short-lived. The revolts faced by Samsu-iluna, followed by the rise of the Sealand, indicate that the defeated cities and regions had not fully accepted the loss of their independence. The unification of Mesopotamia under Babylonian rule was thus a brief phenomenon: it began in the second half of his reign, and his successor lost it. The conquered regions north of Babylonia were never held permanently. It can nevertheless be considered that Hammurabi laid the foundations for a unification of Lower Mesopotamia, relegating the capitals of the ancient kingdoms to the status of provincial towns, and that his reign was an important part of a broader long-term dynamic which saw the affirmation of territorial states in the Middle East.

=== Ancient commemorations ===
Hammurabi was honored above all other kings of the second millennium BC and he received the unique honor of being declared to be a god within his own lifetime. The personal name "Hammurabi-ili" meaning "Hammurabi is my god" became common during and after his reign. In writings from shortly after his death, Hammurabi is commemorated mainly for three achievements: bringing victory in war, bringing peace, and bringing justice. Hammurabi's conquests came to be regarded as part of a sacred mission to spread civilization to all nations. A stele from Ur glorifies him in his own voice as a mighty ruler who forces evil into submission and compels all peoples to worship Marduk. The stele declares: "The people of Elam, Gutium, Subartu, and Tukrish, whose mountains are distant and whose languages are obscure, I placed into [Marduk's] hand. I myself continued to put straight their confused minds." A later hymn also written in Hammurabi's own voice extols him as a powerful, supernatural force for Marduk:

I am the king, the brace that grasps wrongdoers, that makes people of one mind,
I am the great dragon among kings, who throws their counsel in disarray,
I am the net that is stretched over the enemy,
I am the fear-inspiring, who, when lifting his fierce eyes, gives the disobedient the death sentence,
I am the great net that covers evil intent,
I am the young lion, who breaks nets and scepters,
I am the battle net that catches him who offends me.

After extolling Hammurabi's military accomplishments, the hymn finally declares: "I am Hammurabi, the king of justice." In later commemorations, Hammurabi's role as a great lawgiver came to be emphasized above all his other accomplishments and his military achievements became de-emphasized. Hammurabi's reign became the point of reference for all events in the distant past. A hymn to the goddess Ishtar, whose language suggests it was written during the reign of Ammi-Saduqa, Hammurabi's fourth successor, declares: "The king who first heard this song as a song of your heroism is Hammurabi. This song for you was composed in his reign. May he be given life forever!" For centuries after his death, Hammurabi's laws continued to be copied by scribes as part of their writing exercises and they were even partially translated into Sumerian.

Over a thousand years after Hammurabi's death, the kings of Suhum, a land along the Euphrates River, just northwest of Babylon, claimed him as their ancestor.

A Neo-Babylonian royal inscription, which was intended for display on a stele, commemorates a royal grant of tax exemptions to nine Babylonian cities and presents the royal protagonist as a second Hammurabi.

=== Modern receptions ===
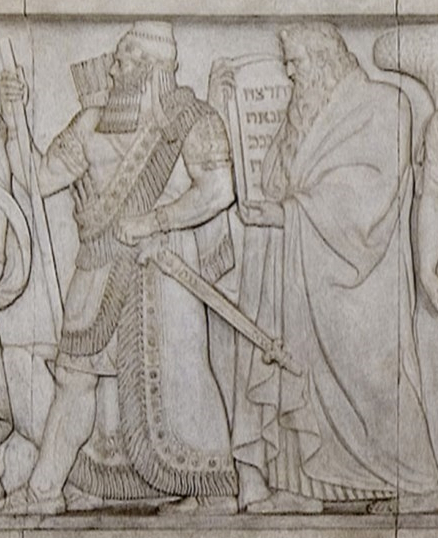
Hammurabi next to Moses on the south frieze of the United States Supreme Court Building

The name of Hammurabi re-emerges from the mists of history in the mid-19th century, when excavations of ancient Mesopotamian sites began and cuneiform writing was deciphered. Two bronze pommels excavated in 1850 at Tell Muhammad bear an inscription referring to the "Palace of Hammurabi," which was not properly deciphered until later. Following the rediscovery of other inscriptions bearing the name of this king, the French assyriologist Joachim Menant published in 1863 the first collection of texts entirely devoted to the king. The stature of this king reached a major level in 1901–1902, when the stela of his Code of Hammurabi was unearthed at Susa. Discovered by a French archaeological team, its long inscription was translated and immediately published by Jean-Vincent Scheil.

In the early twentieth century, many scholars believed that Hammurabi was Amraphel, the King of Shinar in the Book of Genesis 14:1. This view has now been largely rejected, and Amraphel's existence is not attested in any writings from outside the Bible.

Because of Hammurabi's reputation as a lawgiver, his depiction can be found in law buildings throughout the world. Hammurabi is one of the 23 lawgivers depicted in marble bas-reliefs in the chamber of the U.S. House of Representatives in the United States Capitol. A frieze by Adolph Weinman depicting the "great lawgivers of history", including Hammurabi, is on the south wall of the U.S. Supreme Court building.

Hammurabi's legacy was also claimed by Saddam Hussein, who sought to reappropriate the great figures of ancient Mesopotamia to consolidate his power. He had a bronze statue of the king, measuring over 4 meters, placed at the entrance to the Iraqi Parliament, in reference to his role as a legislator.

== Bibliography ==
- Beaulieu, Paul-Alain (2018). A History of Babylon, 2200 BC - AD 75. Malden: Wiley-Blackwell.
- Boivin, Odette (2020). "The Kingdom of Babylon and the Kingdom of the Sealand". In Karen Radner, Nadine Moeller and Daniel T. Potts (ed.). The Oxford History of the Ancient Near East, Volume 2: From the End of the Third Millennium BC to the Fall of Babylon. New York: Oxford University Press. pp. 566–655.
- Charpin, Dominique (2003). Hammu-rabi de Babylone (in French). Paris: Presses Universitaires de France.
- Charpin, Dominique (2004). "Histoire politique du Proche-Orient amorrite (2002-1595)". Mesopotamien: die altbabylonische Zeit (PDF) (in French). Freiburg and Göttingen: Academic Press Fribourg and Vandenhoeck & Ruprecht. pp. 25–480.
- Charpin, Dominique (2012). Hammurabi of Babylon. London: I.B. Tauris. (translation of Charpin (2003))
- Frayne, Douglas (1990). The Royal Inscriptions of Mesopotamia: Early Periods, vol. 4: Old Babylonian Period (2003–1595 BC). Toronto: University of Toronto Press.
- Horsnell, Malcolm J. A. (1999). The Year Names of the First Dynasty of Babylon, vol. 2: The Year-Names reconstructed and Critically Annotated in Light of their Exemplars. Hamilton: McMaster University Press.
- Liverani, Mario (2014). "Hammurabi of Babylon". The Ancient Near East: History, society and economy. London and New York: Routledge. pp. 240–255.
- Michalowski, Piotr; Streck, Michael P. (2017). "Hammurapi". Reallexikon der Assyriologie und Vorderasiatischen Archäologie. Vol. 15. pp. 380–390.
- Radner, Karen (2020). A Short History of Babylon. Londres and New York: Bloomsbury Academic.
- Roth, Martha T. (1995). Law Collections from Mesopotamia and Asia Minor. Atlanta: Society of Biblical Literature. ISBN 978-0-7885-0104-3. Archived from the original on 5 October 2022.
- Sasson, Jack M. (2015). From the Mari Archives: An Anthology of Old Babylonian Letters. University Park, USA: Penn State University Press.
- Van De Mieroop, Marc (2005). King Hammurabi of Babylon: A Biography. Blackwell Publishing. ISBN 978-1-4051-2660-1. OCLC 255676990.

Regnal titles
| Preceded by Sin-Muballit | King of Babylon c. 1792 – c. 1750 BC | Succeeded by Samsu-iluna |
