= Worshipper of Larsa =

Archaeological artifact from Mesopotamia

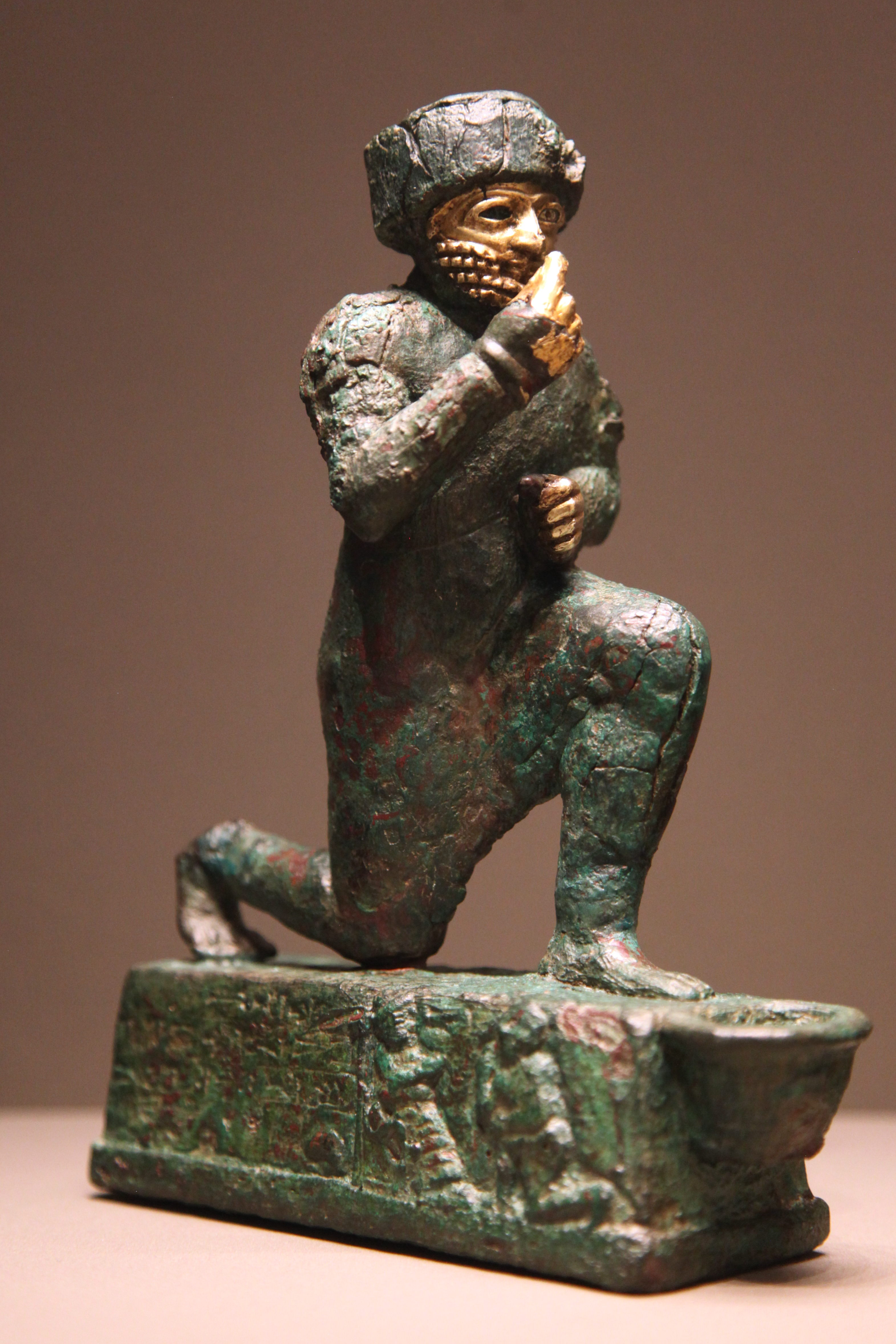
- Dimensions: 19.6 cm (7.7 in) × 7.0 cm (2.8 in) × 14.8 cm (5.8 in)

The Worshipper of Larsa is a Mesopotamian statuette on display in Room 227 at the Louvre Museum, of the paleo-Babylonian era (2004-1595 BCE). It depicts a bearded man, kneeling and performing a ritual gesture with his hand to his mouth. The statuette was dedicated to the god Amurru by an inhabitant of Larsa, in order to safeguard the life of King Hammurabi (reigned c. 1792 BC-1750 BC).

== Description ==
The statuette is made of copper and is 19.6 centimetres (7.7 in) high, 14.8 centimetres (5.8 in) long and 7.0 centimetres (2.8 in) wide. The face, beard and hands of the orant were gilded with gold leaf. The character wears a hat similar to those of royal attires and is putting his hand to his mouth, a gesture of prayer. The right side of the pedestal depicts the same character in the same position in front of a deity, which a long inscription identifies as Amurru, patron god of the Amorrites. The left side features an ox. The front has a small vase used for offerings.

The statuette is exceptionally well-preserved, with a very finely depicted face. It was purchased in 1931, following archaeological excavations at Larsa.

Its Louvre inventory number is AO 15704.

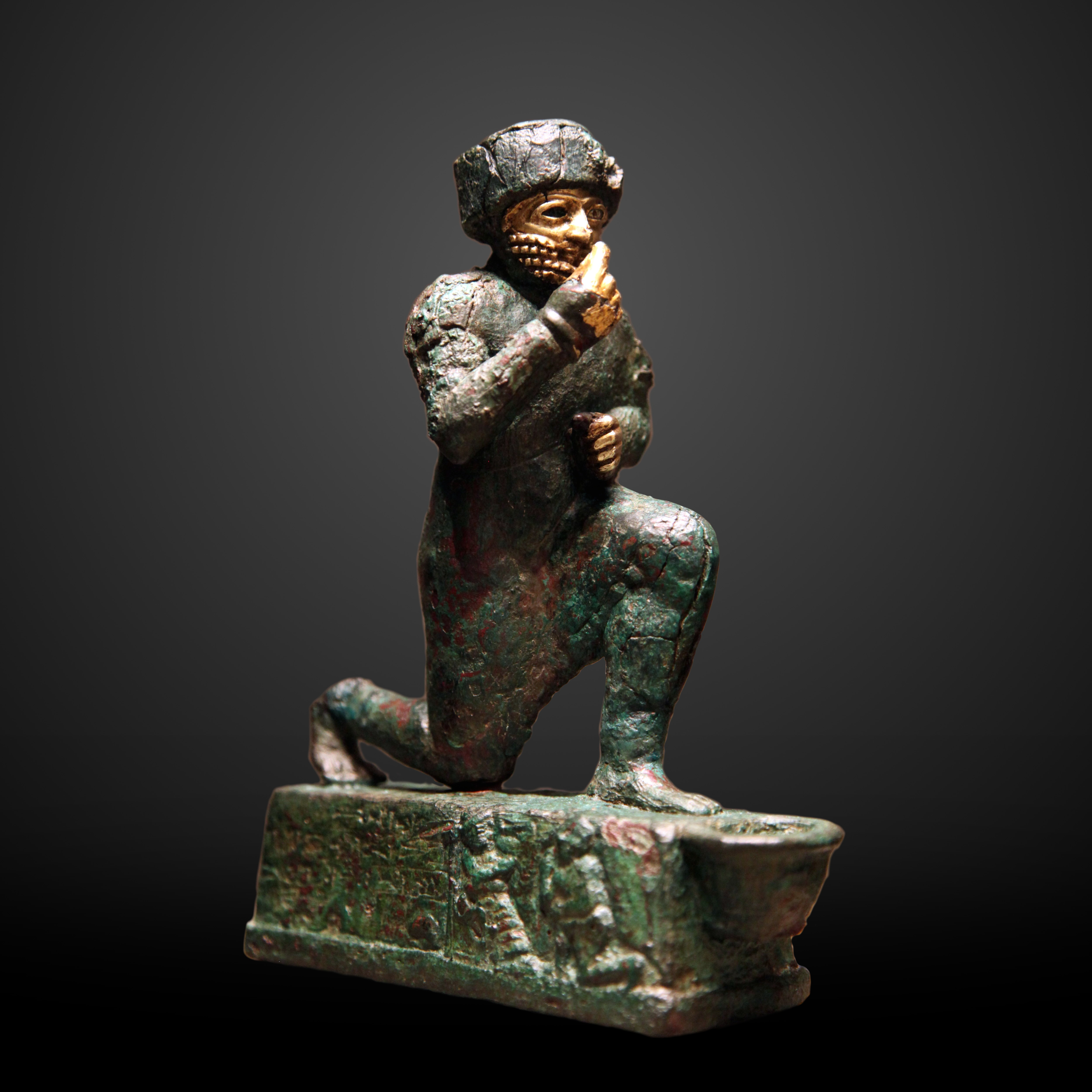

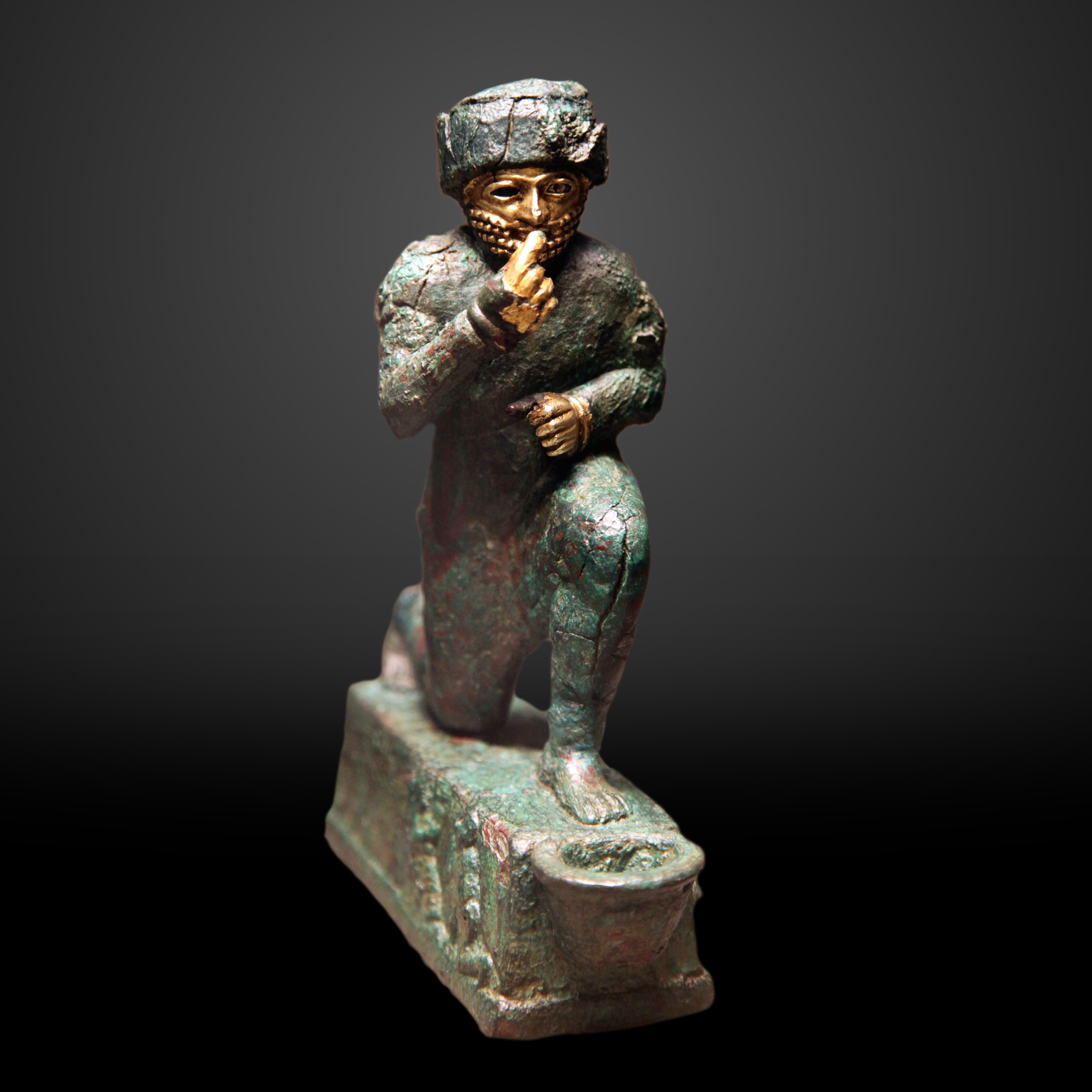

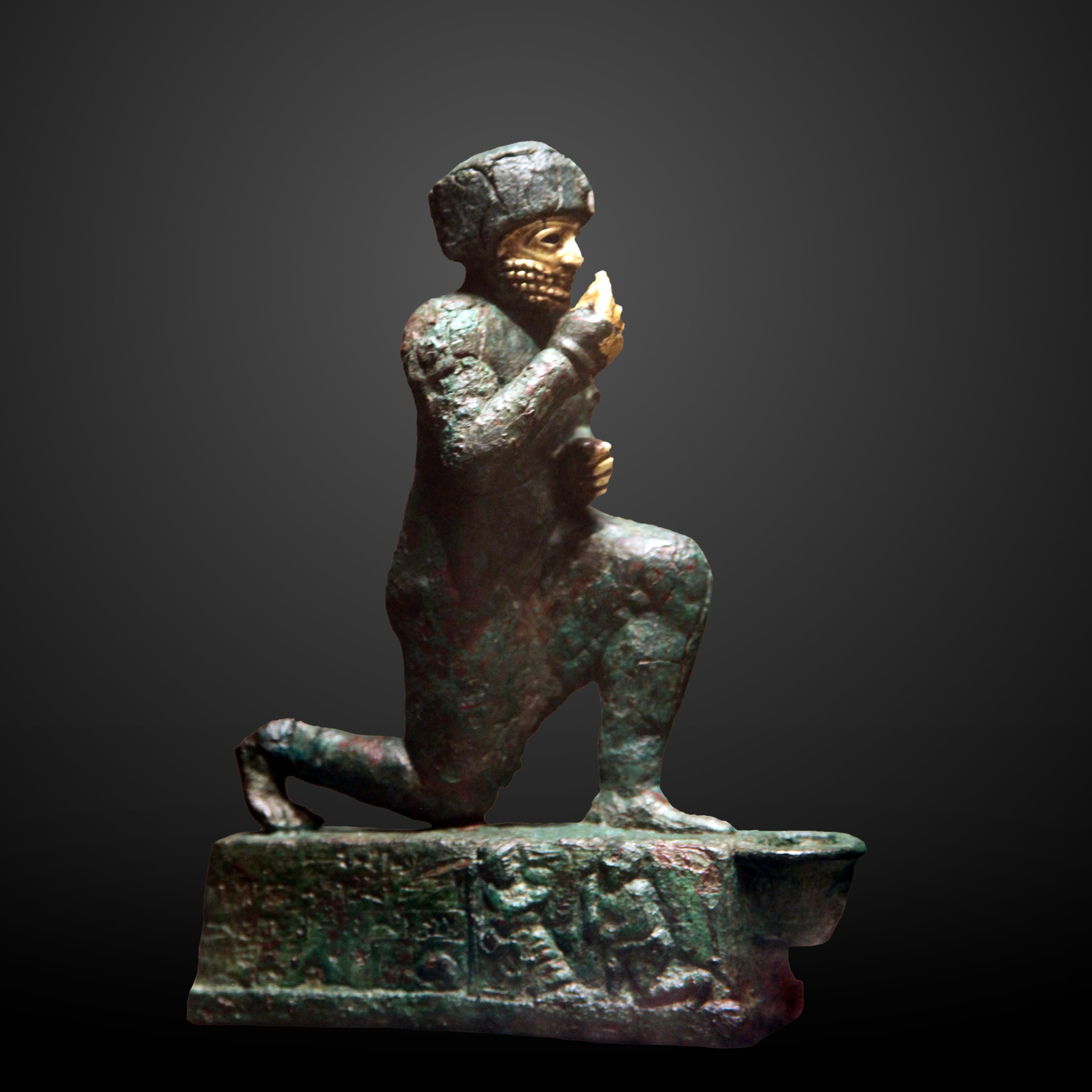

== Inscription ==
The pedestal bears the inscription:

to Amurrum, his god, for the life of Hammurabi, king of Babylon, and for his own life, Lu-Nanna, [(title)], son of Sîn-le'i, made this copper statuette (in position of) begging, with gilded face, and dedicated it to him so it would depict his servant
