= Instructions of Shuruppak =

Sumerian wisdom literature

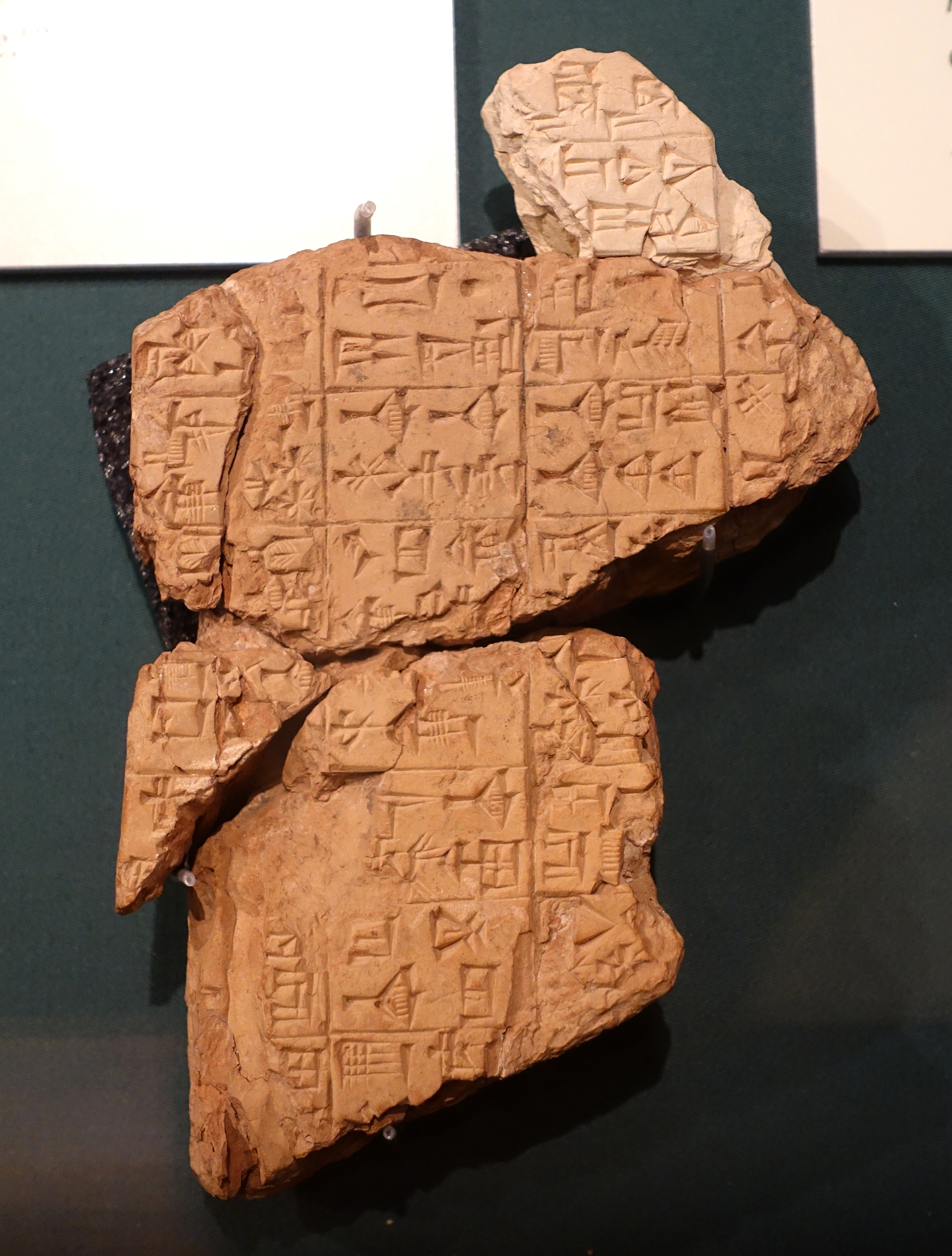
Fragments of the Instructions of Shuruppak: "Shurrupak gave instructions to his son: Do not buy an ass which brays too much. Do not commit rape upon a man's daughter, do not announce it to the courtyard. Do not answer back against your father, do not raise a 'heavy eye.'". From Adab, c. 2600 – c. 2500 BCE

The Instructions of Shuruppak (or, Instructions of Šuruppak) are a significant example of Sumerian wisdom literature. Wisdom literature, intended to teach proper piety, instill virtue, and preserve community standards, was common throughout the ancient Near East. Its incipit sets the text in great antiquity: "In those days, in those far remote times, in those nights, in those faraway nights, in those years, in those far remote years." The precepts are placed in the mouth of a king Šuruppak (SU.KUR.RU^{ki}), son of Ubara-Tutu. Ubara-Tutu is recorded in most extant copies of the Sumerian King List as being the final king of Sumer prior to the deluge. Ubara-tutu is briefly mentioned in tablet XI of the Epic of Gilgamesh, where he is identified as the father of Utnapishtim, a character who is instructed by the god Ea to build a boat in order to survive the coming flood. Grouped with the other cuneiform tablets from Abu Salabikh, the Instructions date to the early third millennium BCE, being among the oldest surviving literature.

The text consists of admonitory sayings of Šuruppak addressed to his son and eventual flood hero Ziusudra (Akkadian: Utnapishtin). Otherwise named as one of the five antediluvian cities in the Sumerian tradition, the name "Šuruppak" appears in one manuscript of the Sumerian King List (WB-62, written SU.KUR.LAM) where it is interpolated as an additional generation between Ubara-Tutu and Ziusudra, who are in every other instance father and son. Lambert reports that it has been suggested the interpolation may have arisen through an epithet of the father ("man of Shuruppak") having been taken wrongly for a proper name. However, this epithet, found in the Gilgamesh XI tablet, is a designation applied to Utnapishtim, not his father.

The Abu Salabikh tablet, dated to the mid–third millennium BCE, is the oldest extant copy, and the numerous surviving copies attest to its continued popularity within the Sumerian/Akkadian literary canons.

Counsels in the three conjoined lists are pithy, occupying one to three lines of cuneiform. Some counsel is purely practical: You should not locate a field on a road; ... You should not make a well in your field: people will cause damage on it for you (lines 15–18). Moral precepts are followed by the negative practical results of transgression: You should not play around with a married young woman: the slander could be serious (lines 32–34). Community opinion and the possibility of slander (line 35) play a major role, whether the valued opinion of "the courtyard" (line 62) or the less valued opinion of the marketplace, where insults and stupid speaking receive the attention of the land (line 142).

The Instructions contain precepts similar to those later included in the Ten Commandments, and other sayings that are reflected in the biblical Book of Proverbs.

== See also ==
- Sumerian literature
