= Noah's Ark =

Vessel in the Genesis flood narrative

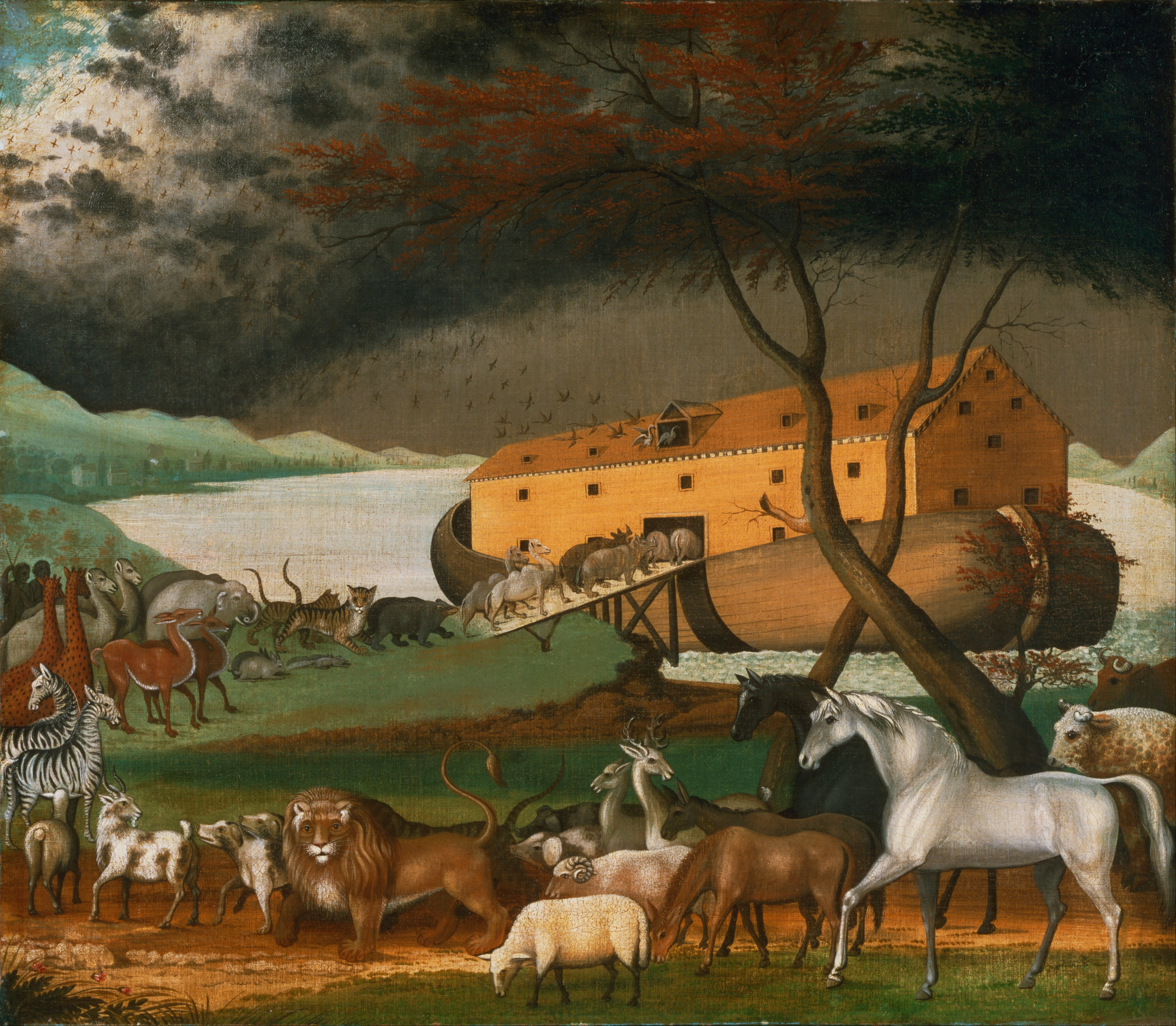
Noah's Ark (1846), by the American folk painter Edward Hicks

Noah's Ark (Hebrew: תיבת נח; Biblical Hebrew: Tevat Noaḥ) (Note: The word ark in modern English comes from Old English earc, meaning a chest or box. (See Cresswell 2010, p.22) The Hebrew word for the vessel, teva, occurs twice in the Torah, in the flood narrative (Book of Genesis 6–9) and in the Book of Exodus, where it refers to the basket in which Jochebed places the infant Moses. (The word for the Ark of the Covenant, aron, is quite different.) The Ark is built to save Noah, his family, and representatives of all animals from a divinely-sent flood intended to wipe out all life, and in both cases, the teva has a connection with salvation from waters. (See Levenson 2014, p.21)) is the boat in the Genesis flood narrative through which God spares Noah, his family, and pairs of each land animal in the world from a global deluge.

The story in Genesis is based on earlier Mesopotamian flood myths. The myth of the global flood that destroys all life begins to appear in the Old Babylonian Empire period (20th–16th centuries BCE). The version closest to the biblical story of Noah, as well as its most likely source, is that of Utnapishtim in the Epic of Gilgamesh. Scholars note shared themes, dimensions, and language but different causes for the flood. Scholars also link its structure to the Jewish Temple.

Religious traditions from Judaism, Christianity, Islam, Gnosticism, Mandaeism, and the Baháʼí Faith each developed distinct interpretations, often assigning spiritual symbolism to the Ark, its construction, or its occupants. Early Christian and Jewish writers, such as Flavius Josephus, believed that Noah's Ark existed. Unsuccessful searches for Noah's Ark have been made from at least the time of Eusebius (c. 275 – c. 339 CE). The story is repeated, with variations, in the Quran, where the Ark appears as Safinat Nūḥ (Arabic: سَفِينَةُ نُوحٍ 'Noah's ship') and al-fulk (الفُلْك). Its cultural legacy endures in literature, theology, art, and large-scale modern reconstructions.

Believers in the Ark continue to search for it in modern times, but no scientific evidence that the Ark existed has ever been found, nor is there scientific evidence for a global flood. According to Robert Moore, the boat and the natural disaster as described in the Bible would have been contingent upon physical impossibilities. Some researchers believe that a real (though localized) flood event in West Asia could potentially have inspired the oral and later written narratives; a Persian Gulf flood, or a Black Sea Deluge 7,500 years ago, alongside the recurring river floods of ancient Mesopotamia has been proposed as such a historical candidate.

== Description ==
The structure of the Ark (and the chronology of the flood) is homologous with the Jewish Temple and with Temple worship. Accordingly, Noah's instructions are given to him by God (Genesis 6:14–16): the ark is to be 300 cubits long, 50 cubits wide, and 30 cubits high (approximately 134×22×13 m or 440×72×43 ft). These dimensions are thought by some to be based on a numerological preoccupation with the number 60, the same number characterizing the vessel of the Babylonian flood hero.

Its three internal divisions reflect the three-part universe imagined by the ancient Israelites: heaven, the earth, and the underworld. Each deck is the same height as the Temple in Jerusalem, itself a microcosmic model of the universe, and each is three times the area of the court of the tabernacle, leading to the suggestion that the author saw both Ark and tabernacle as serving for the preservation of human life. It has a door in the side, and a tsohar, which may be either a roof or a skylight. It is to be made of gopher wood "goper", a word which appears nowhere else in the Bible, but thought to be a loan word from the Akkadian gupru – and divided into qinnim, a word which always refers to birds' nests elsewhere in the Bible, leading some scholars to emend this to qanim, reeds. The finished vessel is to be smeared with koper, meaning pitch or bitumen; in Hebrew the two words are closely related, kaparta ("smeared") ... bakopper. Bitumen is the more likely option, as "koper" is thought to be a loanword from the Akkadian "kupru", meaning bitumen.

The shape of the Ark is described in Genesis with the Hebrew word tevah, whose meaning is unclear and whose only other use in the Bible is to describe the rush basket of Moses; the King James Version of the Bible accordingly describes the Ark as the "ark of bulrushes". The third-century scholar Origen imagined the Ark to have been a square pyramid floating on a raft. What is now the standard visual depiction of the Ark, a ship's hull with a sloped roof and a side door, originates with Hugh of Saint Victor, an 11th century Saxon theologian, who dedicated a treatise to a description of the Ark.

== Origins ==
=== Mesopotamian precursors ===
For well over a century, scholars have said that the Bible's story of Noah's Ark is based on older Mesopotamian models. Because all these flood stories deal with events that allegedly happened at the dawn of history, they give the impression that the myths themselves must come from very primitive origins, but the myth of a global flood that destroys all life does not appear until the Old Babylonian period (20th–16th centuries BCE). The reasons for this emergence of the typical Mesopotamian flood myth may have been bound up with the specific circumstances of the end of the Third Dynasty of Ur around 2004 BCE and the restoration of order by the First Dynasty of Isin.

Nine versions of the Mesopotamian flood story are known, each more or less adapted from an earlier version. In the oldest version, inscribed in the Sumerian city of Nippur around 1600 BCE, the hero is King Ziusudra. This story, the Sumerian flood myth, probably derives from an earlier version. The Ziusudra version tells how he builds a boat and rescues life when the gods decide to destroy it. This basic plot is common in several subsequent flood stories and heroes, including Noah. Ziusudra's Sumerian name means "he of long life." In Babylonian versions, his name is Atrahasis, but the meaning is the same. In the Atrahasis version, the flood is a river flood.

The version closest to the biblical story of Noah is that of Utnapishtim in the Epic of Gilgamesh. A complete text of Utnapishtim's story is contained on a clay tablet dating from the seventh century BCE, but fragments of the story have been found from as far back as the 19th century BCE. The last known version of the Mesopotamian flood story was written in Greek in the third century BCE by a Babylonian priest named Berossus. From the fragments that survive, it seems little changed from the versions of 2,000 years before.

The parallels between Noah's Ark and the arks of Babylonian flood heroes Atrahasis and Utnapishtim have often been noted. Atrahasis's Ark was circular, resembling an enormous quffa, with one or two decks. Utnapishtim's ark was a cube with six decks of seven compartments, each divided into nine subcompartments (63 subcompartments per deck, 378 total). Noah's Ark was rectangular with three decks. A progression is believed to exist from a circular to a cubic or square to rectangular. The most striking similarity is the near-identical deck areas of the three arks: 14,400 cubits^{2}, 14,400 cubits^{2}, and 15,000 cubits^{2} for Atrahasis, Utnapishtim, and Noah, only 4% different. Irving Finkel concluded, "the iconic story of the Flood, Noah, and the Ark as we know it today certainly originated in the landscape of ancient Mesopotamia, modern Iraq."

Linguistic parallels between Noah's and Atrahasis' arks have also been noted. The word used for "pitch" (sealing tar or resin) in Genesis is not the normal Hebrew word, but is closely related to the word used in the Babylonian story. Likewise, the Hebrew word for "ark" (tēvāh) is nearly identical to the Babylonian word for an oblong boat (ṭubbû), especially given that "v" and "b" are the same letter in Hebrew: bet (ב).

However, the causes for God or the gods sending the flood differ in the various stories. In the Hebrew myth, the flood inflicts God's judgment on wicked humanity. The Babylonian Epic of Gilgamesh gives no reasons, and the flood appears to be the result of divine caprice. In the Babylonian Atrahasis version, the flood is sent to reduce human overpopulation, and after the flood, other measures were introduced to limit humanity.

=== Composition ===
A consensus among scholars indicates that the Torah (the first five books of the Bible, beginning with Genesis) was the product of a long and complicated process that was not completed until after the Babylonian exile. Since the 18th century, the flood narrative has been analysed as a paradigm example of the combination of two different versions of a story into a single text, with one marker for the different versions being a consistent preference for different names "Elohim" and "Yahweh" to denote God.

== Religious views ==
=== Rabbinic Judaism ===
The Talmudic tractates Sanhedrin, Avodah Zarah, and Zevahim relate that, while Noah was building the Ark, he attempted to warn his neighbors of the coming deluge, but was ignored or mocked. God placed lions and other ferocious animals to protect Noah and his family from the wicked who tried to keep them from the Ark. According to one Midrash, it was God, or the angels, who gathered the animals and their food to the Ark. As no need existed to distinguish between clean and unclean animals before this time, the clean animals made themselves known by kneeling before Noah as they entered the Ark. A differing opinion is that the Ark itself distinguished clean animals from unclean, admitting seven pairs each of the former and one pair each of the latter.

According to Sanhedrin 108b, Noah was engaged both day and night in feeding and caring for the animals, and did not sleep for the entire year aboard the Ark. The animals were the best of their kind and behaved with utmost goodness. They did not procreate, so the number of creatures that disembarked was exactly equal to the number that embarked. The raven created problems, refusing to leave the Ark when Noah sent it forth, and accusing the patriarch of wishing to destroy its race, but as the commentators pointed out, God wished to save the raven, for its descendants were destined to feed the prophet Elijah.

According to one tradition, refuse was stored on the lowest of the Ark's three decks, humans and clean beasts on the second, and the unclean animals and birds on the top. A differing interpretation described the refuse as being stored on the topmost deck, from where it was shoveled into the sea through a trapdoor. Precious stones, as bright as the noon sun, provided light, and God ensured the food remained fresh. In an unorthodox interpretation, the 12th-century Jewish commentator Abraham ibn Ezra interpreted the ark as a vessel that remained underwater for 40 days, after which it floated to the surface.

=== Christianity ===
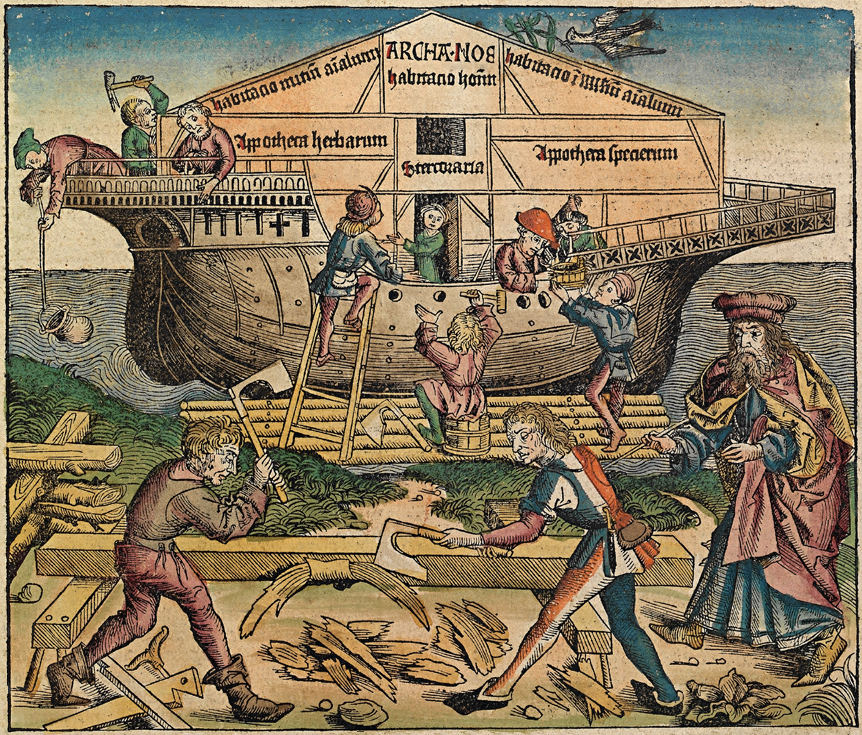
An artist's depiction of the construction of the Ark, from the Nuremberg Chronicle (1493)

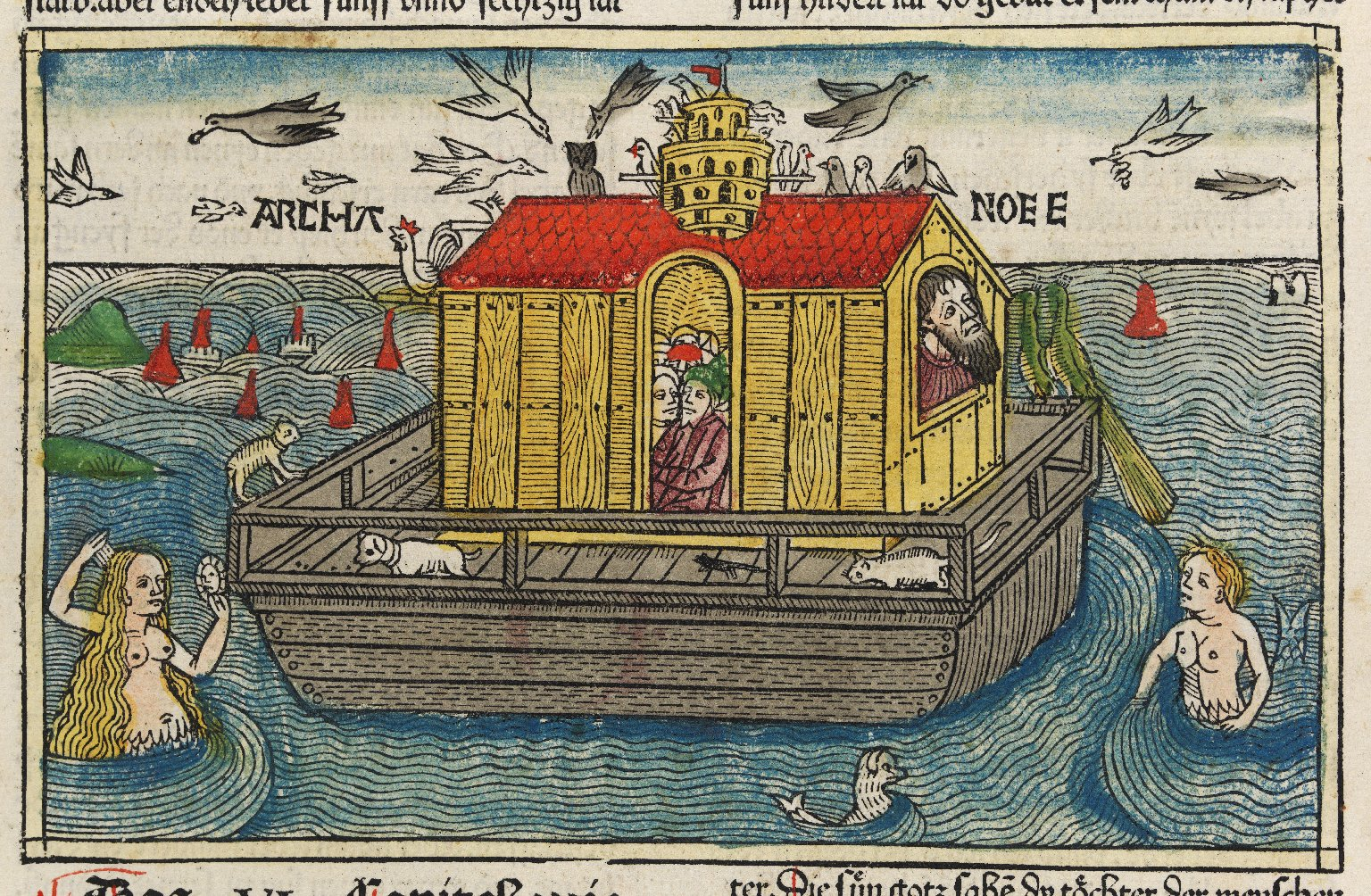
A woodcut of Noah's Ark from Anton Koberger's German Bible

The First Epistle of Peter (composed around the end of the first century AD) compared Noah's salvation through water to Christian salvation through baptism. Hippolytus of Rome (died 235) sought to demonstrate that "the Ark was a symbol of the Christ who was expected", stating that the vessel had its door on the east side—the direction from which Christ would appear at the Second Coming—and that the bones of Adam were brought aboard, together with gold, frankincense, and myrrh (the symbols of the Nativity of Christ). Hippolytus furthermore stated that the Ark floated to and fro in the four directions on the waters, making the sign of the cross, before eventually landing on Mount Kardu "in the east, in the land of the sons of Raban, and the Orientals call it Mount Godash; the Armenians call it Ararat". On a more practical plane, Hippolytus explained that the lowest of the three decks was for wild beasts, the middle for birds and domestic animals, and the top for humans. He says male animals were separated from females by sharp stakes to prevent breeding.

The early Church Father and theologian Origen (c. 182 – c. 251 AD), in response to a critic who doubted that the Ark could contain all the animals in the world, argued that Moses, the traditional author of the book of Genesis, had been brought up in Egypt and would therefore have used the larger Egyptian cubit.

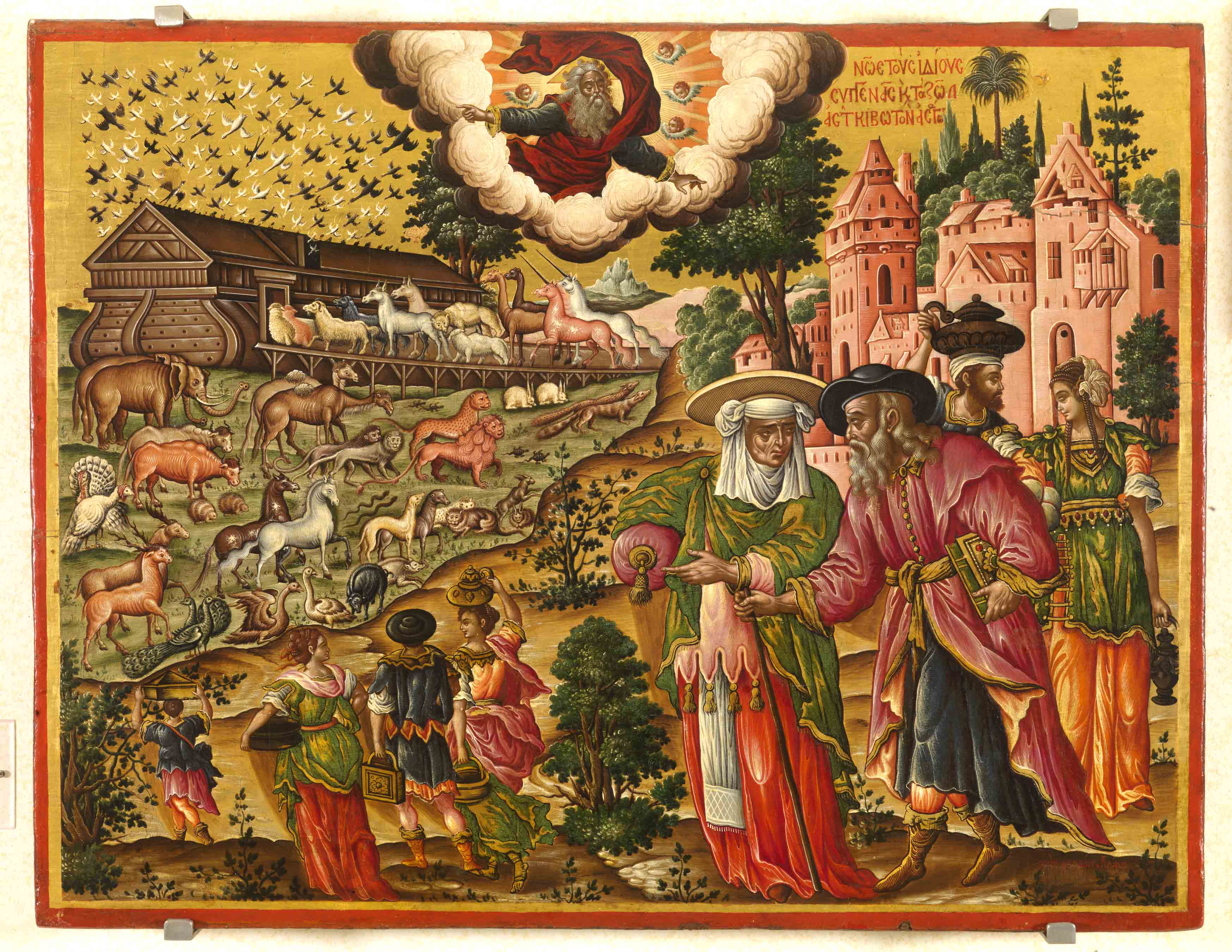
Noah's Ark by Theodore Poulakis, 1650-1692, depicting animals traveling to an ark.

He also fixed the shape of the Ark as a truncated pyramid, square at its base, and tapering to a square peak one cubit on a side; only in the 12th century did it come to be thought of as a rectangular box with a sloping roof.

Early Christian artists depicted Noah standing in a small box on the waves, symbolizing God saving the Christian Church in its turbulent early years. Augustine of Hippo (354–430), in his work City of God, demonstrated that the dimensions of the Ark corresponded to the dimensions of the human body, which according to Christian doctrine is the body of Christ and in turn the body of the Church. Jerome (c. 347 – c. 420) identified the raven, which was sent forth and did not return, as the "foul bird of wickedness" expelled by baptism; more enduringly, the dove and olive branch came to symbolize the Holy Spirit and the hope of salvation and eventually, peace. The olive branch remains a secular and religious symbol of peace today.

=== Gnosticism ===
According to the Hypostasis of the Archons, a 3rd-century Gnostic text, Noah is chosen to be spared by the evil Archons when they try to destroy the other inhabitants of the Earth with the great flood. He is told to create the ark then board it at a location called Mount Sir, but when Norea wants to board it as well, Noah attempts to not let her. So she decides to use her divine power to blow upon the ark and set it ablaze, therefore Noah is forced to rebuild it.

=== Mandaeism ===
In Book 18 of the Right Ginza, a Mandaean text, Noah and his family are saved from the Great Flood because they were able to build an ark or kawila (or kauila, a Mandaic term; it is cognate with Syriac kēʾwilā, which is attested in the Peshitta New Testament, such as Matthew 24:38 and Luke 17:27).

=== Islam ===
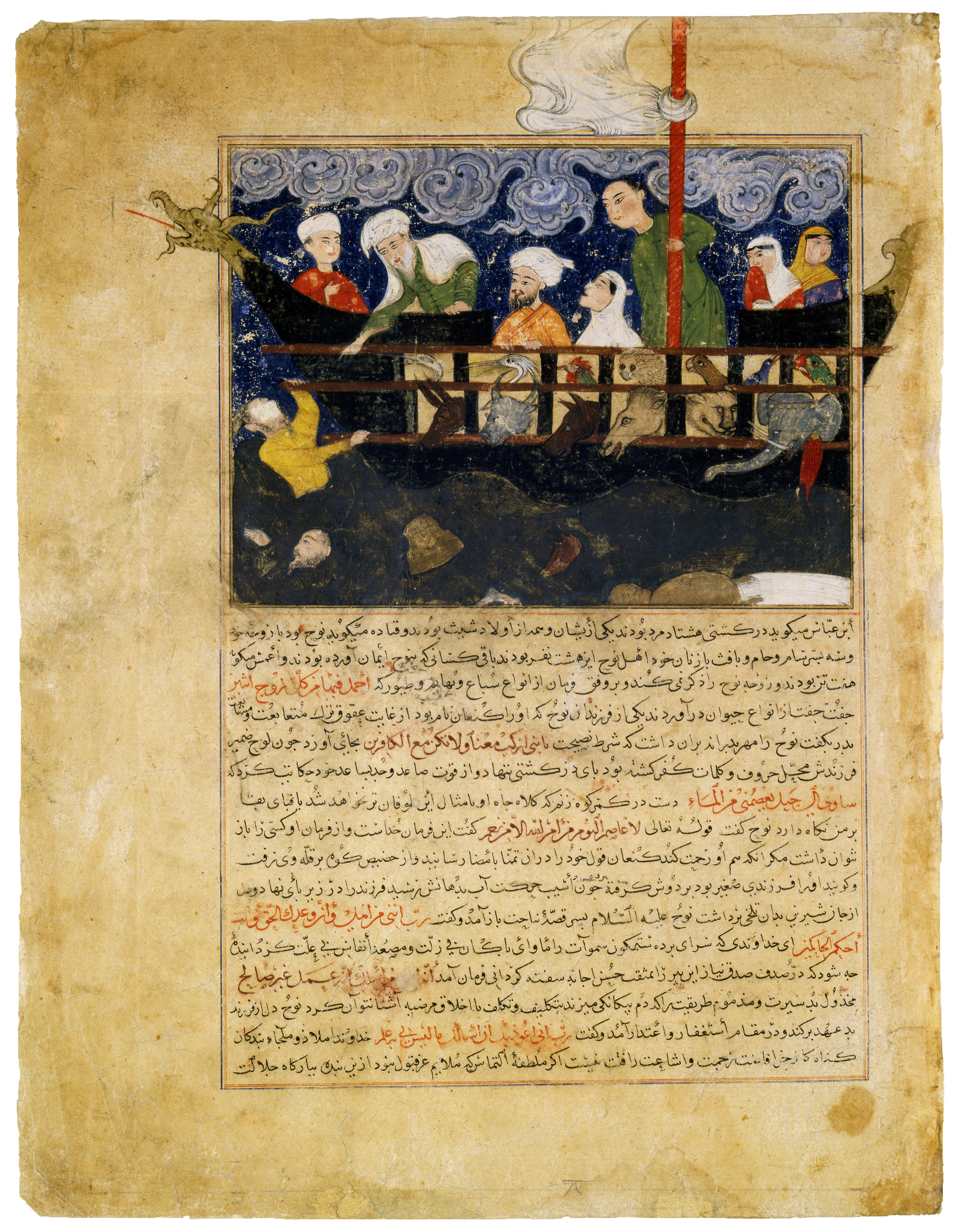
Persian Miniature from Hafiz-i Abru's Majma al-tawarikh. Noah's Ark Iran (Afghanistan), Herat; Timur's son Shah Rukh (1405–1447) ordered the historian Hafiz-i Abru to write a continuation of Rashid al-Din's famous history of the world, Jami al-tawarikh. Like the Il-Khanids, the Timurids were concerned with legitimizing their right to rule, and Hafiz-i Abru's A Collection of Histories covers a period that included the time of Shah Rukh himself.

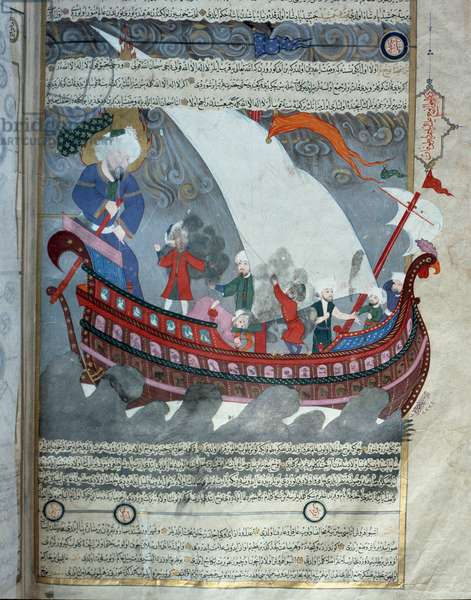
Noah's Ark and the deluge from Zubdat-al Tawarikh

In contrast to the Jewish tradition, which uses a term that can be translated as a "box" or "chest" to describe the Ark, surah 29:15 of the Quran refers to it as a safina, an ordinary ship; surah 7:64 uses fulk, and surah 54:13 describes the Ark as "a thing of boards and nails". Abd Allah ibn Abbas, a contemporary of Muhammad, wrote that Noah was in doubt as to what shape to make the Ark and that Allah revealed to him that it was to be shaped like a bird's belly and fashioned of teak wood.

The medieval scholar Abu al-Hasan Ali ibn al-Husayn Masudi (died 956) wrote that Allah commanded the Earth to absorb the water, and certain portions which were slow in obeying received salt water in punishment and so became dry and arid. The water which was not absorbed formed the seas, so that the waters of the flood still exist. Masudi says the ark began its voyage at Kufa in central Iraq and sailed to Mecca, circling the Kaaba before finally traveling to Mount Judi, which surah 11:44 gives as its final resting place. This mountain is identified by tradition with a hill near the town of Jazirat ibn Umar on the east bank of the Tigris in the province of Mosul in northern Iraq, and Masudi says that the spot could be seen in his time.

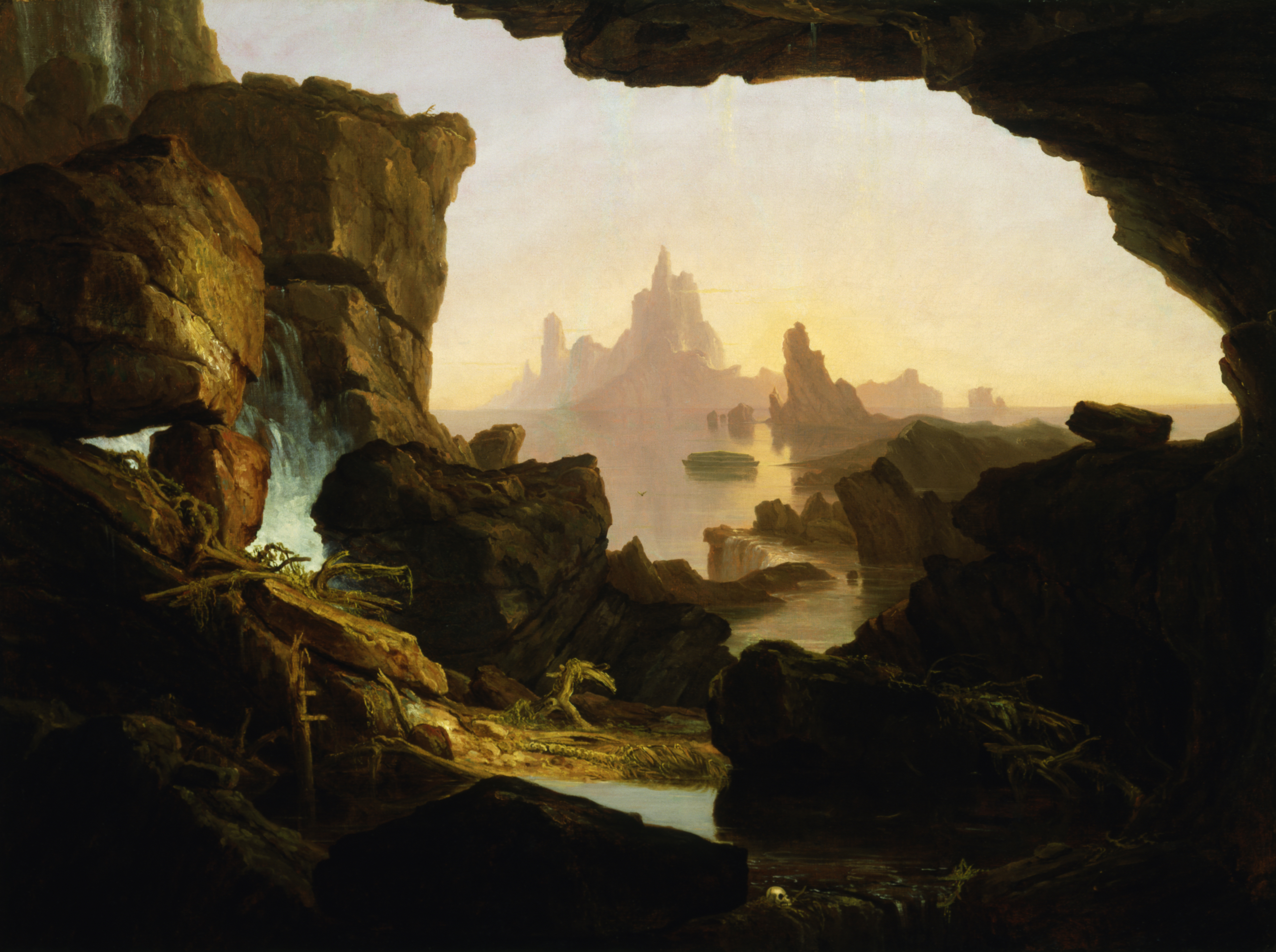
The Subsiding of the Waters of the Deluge (1829), a painting by the American painter Thomas Cole

=== Baháʼí Faith ===
The Baháʼí Faith regards the Ark and the Flood as symbolic. In Baháʼí belief, only Noah's followers were spiritually alive, preserved in the "ark" of his teachings, as others were spiritually dead. The Baháʼí scripture Kitáb-i-Íqán endorses the Islamic belief that Noah had numerous companions on the ark, either 40 or 72, as well as his family, and that he taught for 950 (symbolic) years before the flood. The Baháʼí Faith was founded in 19th century Persia, and it recognizes divine messengers from both the Abrahamic and the Indian traditions.

=== Ancient accounts ===
Multiple Jewish and Christian writers in the ancient world wrote about the ark. The first-century historian Josephus reports that the Armenians believed that the remains of the Ark lay "in Armenia, at the mountain of the Cordyaeans", in a location they called the Place of Descent (Ancient Greek: αποβατηριον). He goes on to say that many other writers of "barbarian histories", including Nicolaus of Damascus, Berossus, and Mnaseas mention the flood and the Ark in Armenia.

In the fourth century, Epiphanius of Salamis wrote about Noah's Ark in his Panarion, saying "Thus even today the remains of Noah's ark are still shown in Cardyaei. And if one were to look further, no doubt at the foot of the mountain one would find the altar of Noah, and the remains of his sacrifices." Other translations render "Cardyaei" as "the country of the Kurds".

John Chrysostom mentioned Noah's Ark in one of his sermons in the fourth century, saying ""Do not the mountains of Armenia testify to it, where the Ark rested? And are not the remains of the Ark preserved there to this very day for our admonition?

== Historicity ==
The first edition of the Encyclopædia Britannica from 1771 describes the Ark as factual. It also attempts to explain how the Ark could house all living animal types: "... Buteo and Kircher have proved geometrically, that, taking the common cubit as a foot and a half, the ark was abundantly sufficient for all the animals supposed to be lodged in it ... the number of species of animals will be found much less than is generally imagined, not amounting to a hundred species of quadrupeds." It also endorses a supernatural explanation for the flood, stating that "many attempts have been made to account for the deluge by means of natural causes: but these attempts have only tended to discredit philosophy, and to render their authors ridiculous."

The 1860 edition attempts to solve the problem of the Ark being unable to house all animal types by suggesting a local flood, which is described in the 1910 edition as part of a "gradual surrender of attempts to square scientific facts with a literal interpretation of the Bible" that resulted in "the 'higher criticism' and the rise of the modern scientific views as to the origin of species" leading to "scientific comparative mythology" as the frame in which Noah's Ark was interpreted by 1875.

=== Ark's geometry ===
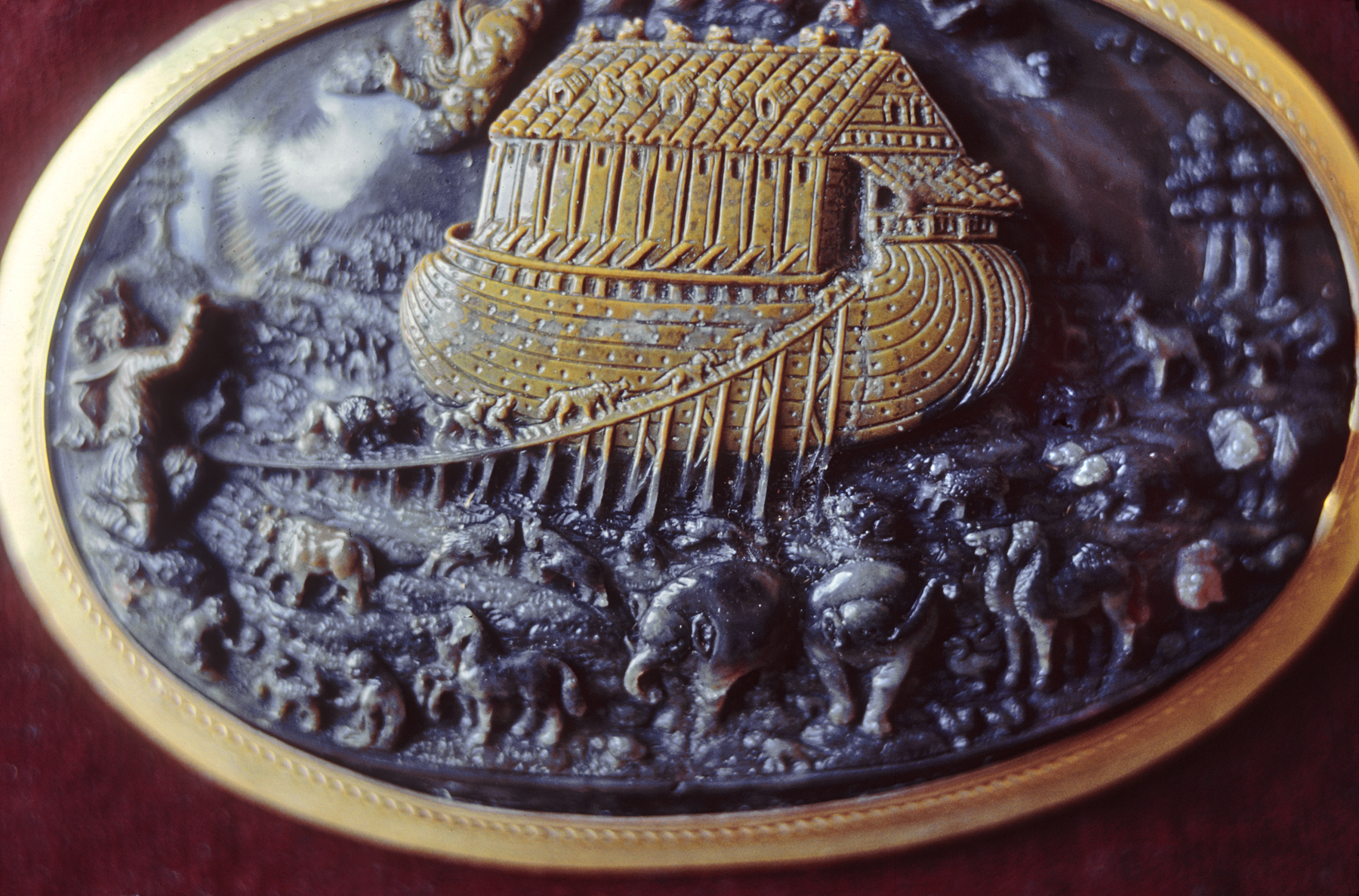
This engraving features a line of animals on the gangway to Noah's ark. It is based on a woodcut by the French illustrator Bernard Salomon. From the Walters Art Museum.

In Europe, the Renaissance saw much speculation on the nature of the Ark that might have seemed familiar to early theologians such as Origen and Augustine. At the same time, however, a new class of scholarship arose, one which, while never questioning the literal truth of the ark story, began to speculate on the practical workings of Noah's vessel from within a purely naturalistic framework. In the 15th century, Alfonso Tostada gave a detailed account of arkite logistics, down to arrangements for the disposal of dung and for the circulation of fresh air. The 16th-century geometer Johannes Buteo calculated the Ark's internal dimensions, allowing room for Noah's grinding mills and smokeless ovens, a model widely adopted by other commentators.

Irving Finkel, a curator at the British Museum, came into the possession of a cuneiform tablet from present-day Iraq. He translated it and discovered an hitherto unknown Babylonian version of the story of the great flood. This version gave specific measurements for an unusually large quffa (a type of coracle). His discovery led to the production of a television documentary and a book (The Ark Before Noah: Decoding the Story of the Flood, 2014) summarizing the finding. A scale replica of the boat described by the tablet was built and floated in Kerala, India.

=== Searches for Noah's Ark ===
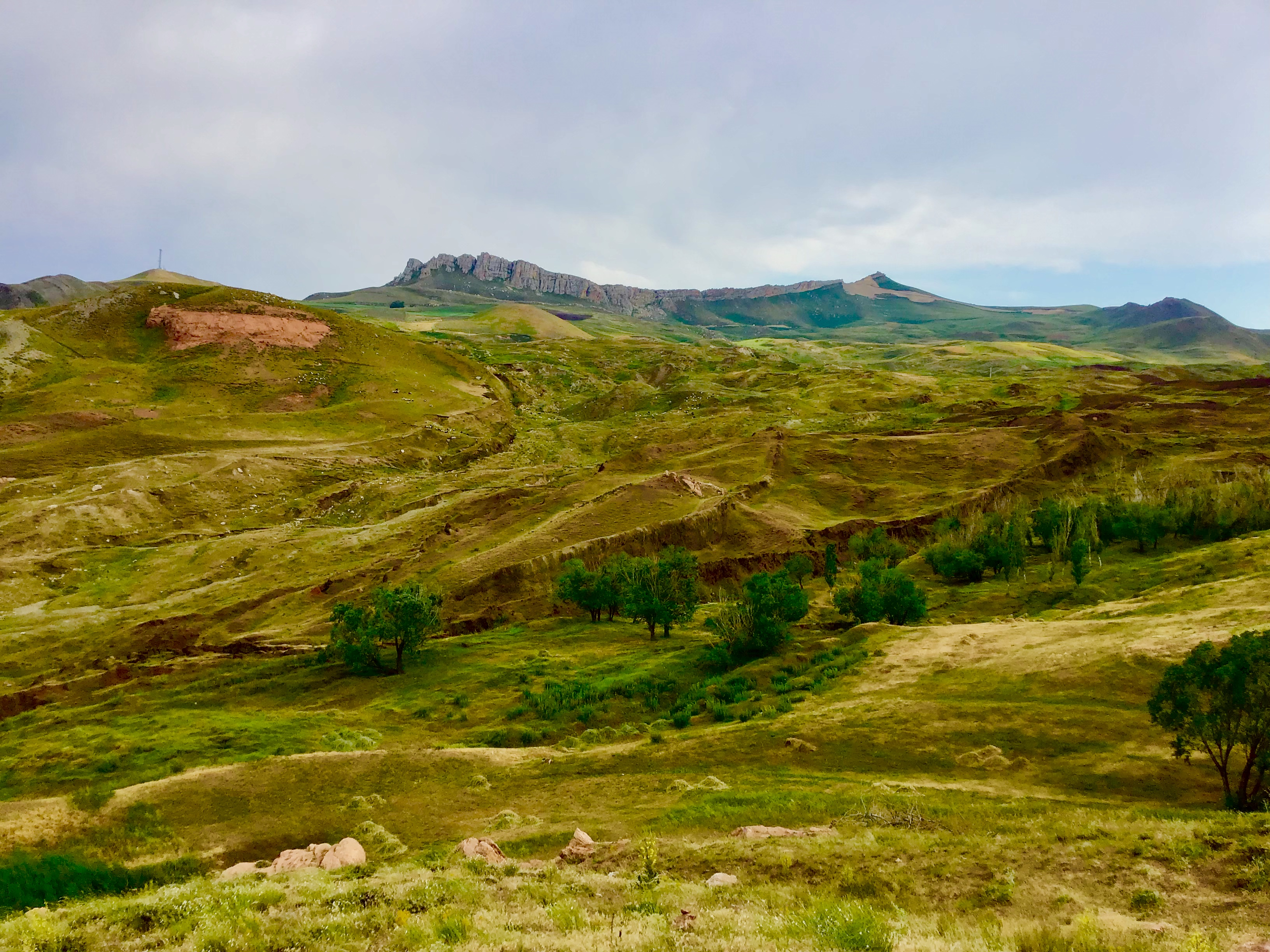
The Durupinar site in July 2019

Searches for Noah's Ark have been made from at least the time of Eusebius (c. 275 – c. 339 CE) to the present day. In the 1st century, Jewish historian Flavius Josephus claimed the remaining pieces of Noah's Ark had been found in Armenia, at the mountain of the Cordyaeans, which is understood to be Mount Ararat in modern-day Turkey. Today, the practice of seeking the remains of the Ark is widely regarded as pseudoarchaeology. Various locations for the ark have been suggested but have never been confirmed. Search sites have included the Durupınar site on Mount Tendürek, and Mount Ararat, both in eastern Anatolia, but geological investigation of possible remains of the ark has only shown natural sedimentary formations. While biblical literalists often maintain the Ark's existence in archaeological history, its scientific feasibility, along with that of the deluge, has been rejected.

== Cultural legacy ==
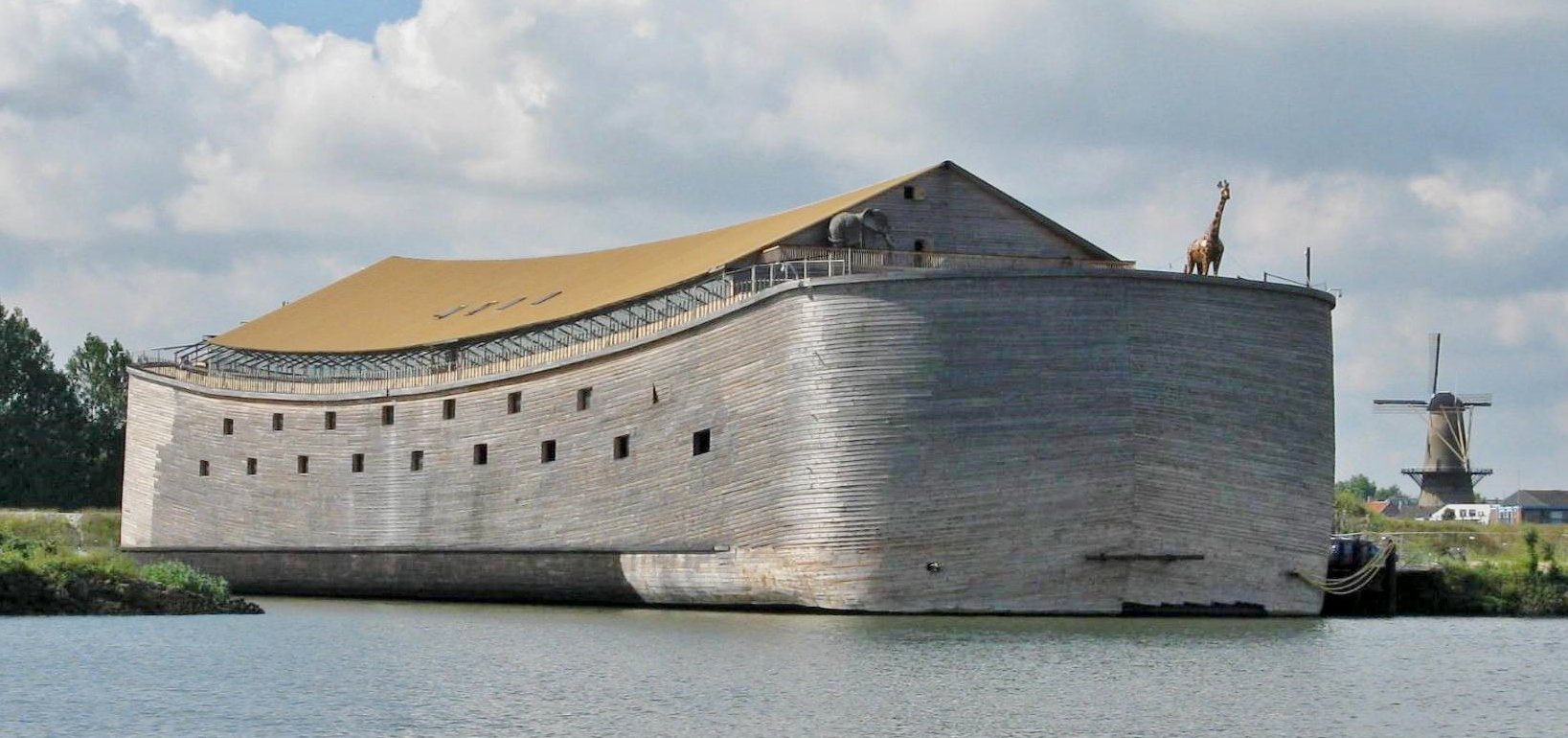
Full size interpretation of Noah's Ark in Dordrecht, Netherlands

In the modern era, individuals and organizations have sought to reconstruct Noah's ark using the dimensions specified in the Bible. Johan's Ark was completed in 2012 to this end, while the Ark Encounter was finished in 2016.

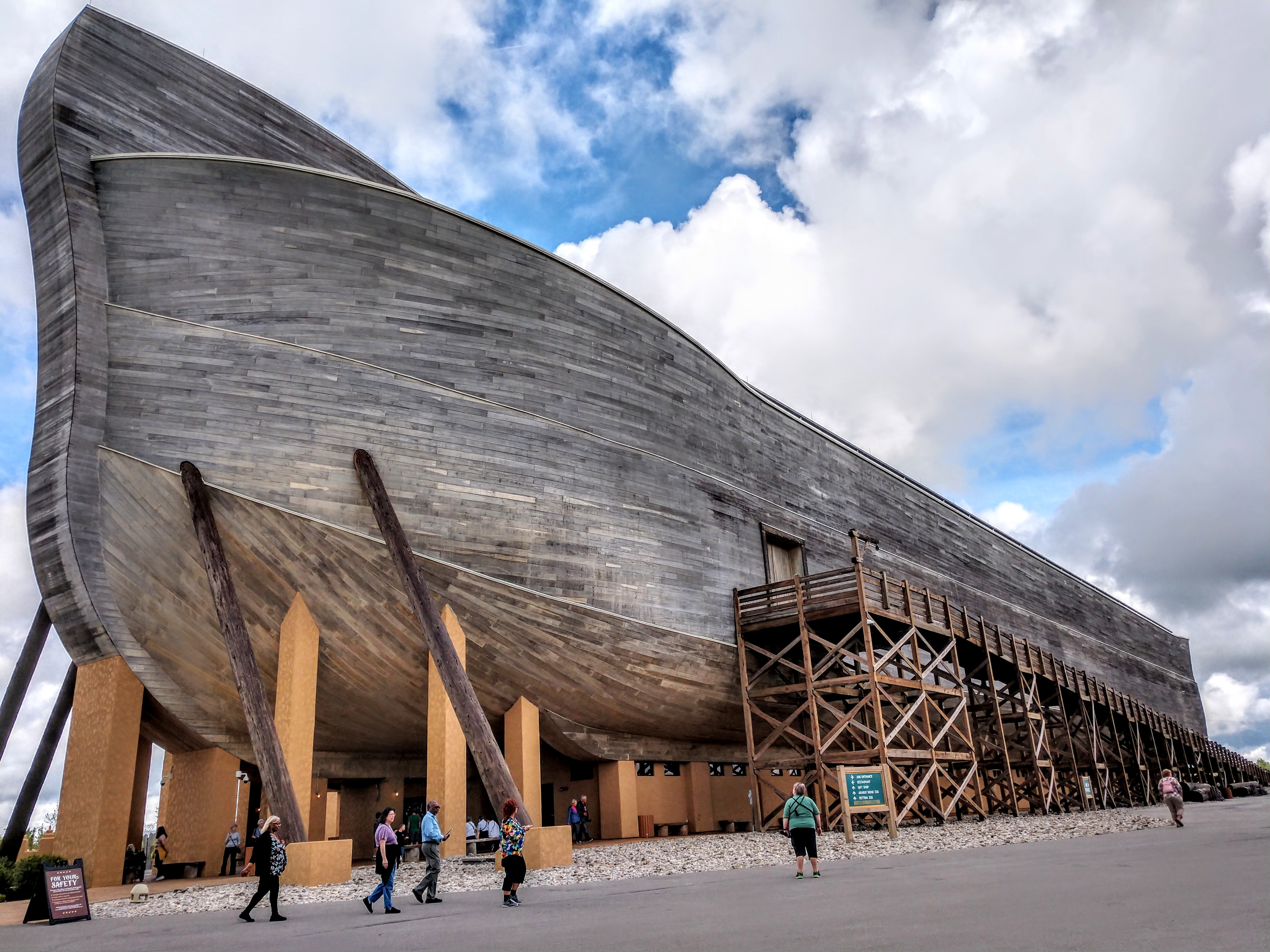
The Ark Encounter

== See also ==
- Biblical literalism
- Book of Noah
- Dwyfan and Dwyfach
- Gilgamesh flood myth
- İlandağ of the Lesser Caucasus in Nakhchivan, Azerbaijan
- List of topics characterized as pseudoscience
- Manu (Hinduism)
- Matsya
- Noah's Ark replicas and derivatives
- The Sinjar Mountains in Iraq
- Sons of Noah
- Wives aboard Noah's Ark
- Ziusudra
