= Gilgamesh flood myth =

Flood myth in the Epic of Gilgamesh

Gilgamesh tablet XI
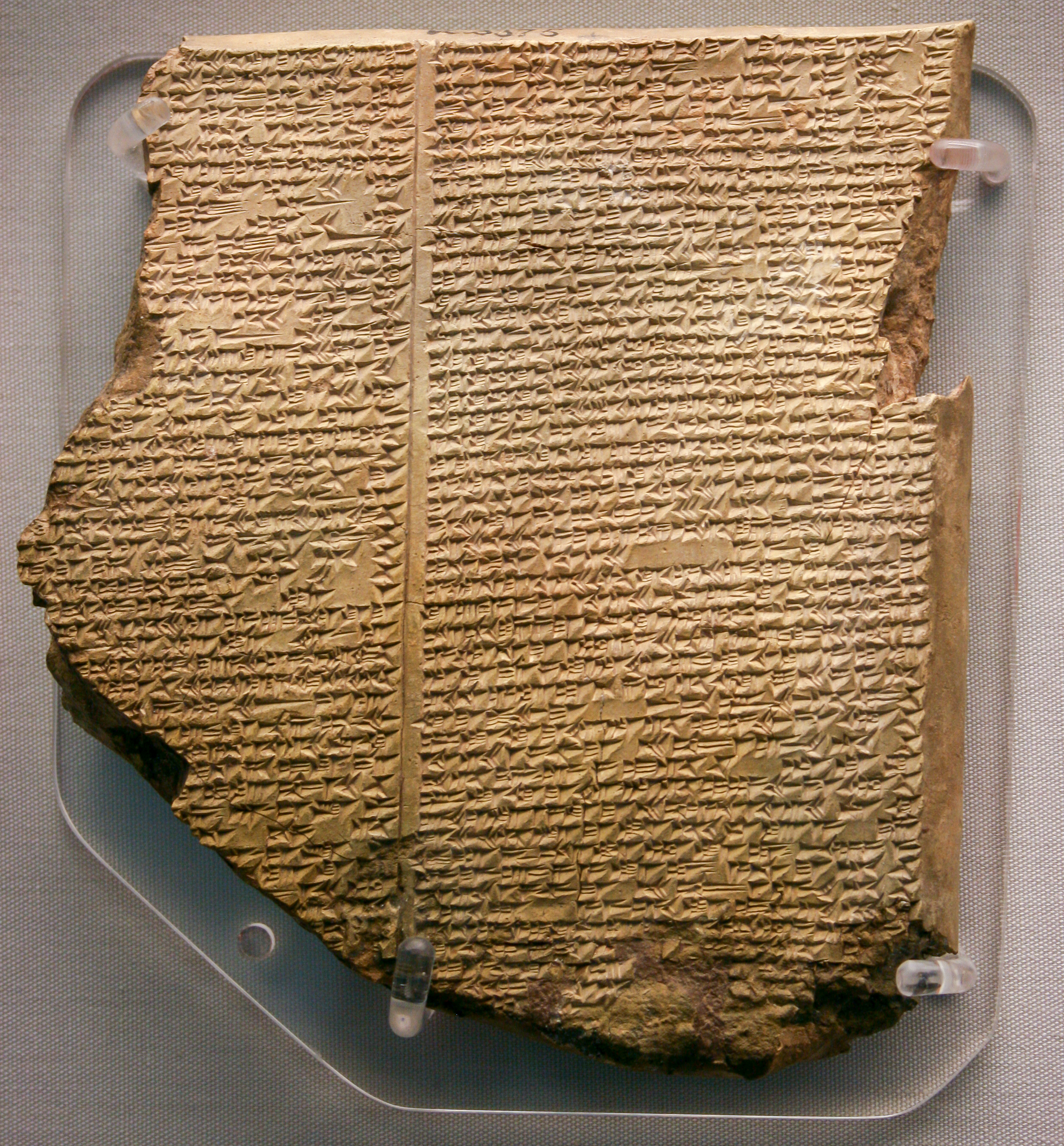
- Flood tablet in Akkadian
- Material: clay
- Size: Length: 15.24 cm (6.00 in); Breadth: 13.33 cm (5.25 in); Depth: 3.17 cm (1.25 in)
- Writing: cuneiform
- Created: 7th century BCE
- Period/culture: Neo-Assyrian
- Discovered: Kouyunjik
- Present location: Room 55, British Museum, London
- Identification: K.3375

The Gilgamesh flood myth is a partial narrative of the Gilgamesh Epic. It is one of three Mesopotamian flood myths alongside the one included in the Eridu Genesis, and an episode from the Atra-Hasis Epic. Many scholars believe that the Gilgamesh flood myth was added to Tablet XI in the "standard version" of the Gilgamesh Epic by an editor who used the flood story, which is described in the Epic of Atra-Hasis. A short reference to the flood myth is also present in the much older Sumerian Gilgamesh poems, from which the later Babylonian versions drew much of their inspiration and subject matter.

== History ==
Gilgamesh's supposed historical reign is believed to have been approximately 2700 BC, shortly before the earliest known written stories. The discovery of artifacts associated with Aga and Enmebaragesi of Kish, two other kings named in the stories, has lent credibility to the historical existence of Gilgamesh.

The earliest Sumerian Gilgamesh poems date from as early as the Third dynasty of Ur (2100–2000 BC). One of these poems mentions Gilgamesh’s journey to meet the flood hero, as well as a short version of the flood story. The earliest Akkadian versions of the unified epic are dated to ca. 2000–1500 BC. Due to the fragmentary nature of these Old Babylonian versions, it is unclear whether they included an expanded account of the flood myth, although one fragment definitely includes the story of Gilgamesh's journey to meet Utnapishtim. The "standard" Akkadian version included a long version of the story and was edited by Sin-liqe-unninni, who lived sometime between 1300 and 1000 BC.

== Tablets ==
The first Gilgamesh flood tablet was discovered by Hormuzd Rassam in Nineveh and was in the collection of the British Museum, but had not been translated. In 1872, George Smith, an assistant at the British Museum, translated the tablet from the seventh-century B.C Akkadian. Reportedly, he exclaimed, "I am the first man to read that after more than two thousand years of oblivion".

While on a subsequent archeological expedition to Nineveh in Iraq, Smith found a portion of a tablet on 7 May 1873 containing the missing part of the flood story, describing the provisioning of the ark: "Into the midst of it thy grain, thy furniture, and thy goods, thy wealth, thy woman servants, thy female slaves...the animals of the field all, I will gather and I will send to thee, and they shall be enclosed in thy door."

A much older cuneiform tablet dating to 1646–1626 BC, about one thousand years before the Book of Genesis, is believed to have been written. Known as the Epic of Atra-Hasis, it describes a great flood, and was discovered in 1898. J. P. Morgan acquired it, and today it is in the Morgan Library & Museum.

In 2007, Andrew George translated a 3,200-year-old tablet dating to around 1200 BC found during excavations at Ugarit. The tablet contains a fragment of the Epic of Gilgamesh, including parts of the story of Utnapishtim and the flood.

== Tablet 11 ==
The Gilgamesh flood tablet 11 (XI) contains additional story material besides the flood. The flood story was included because in it, the flood hero Utnapishtim is granted immortality by the gods and that fits the immortality theme of the epic. The main point seems to be that Utnapishtim was granted eternal life in unique, never-to-be-repeated circumstances. As if to demonstrate this point, Utnapishtim challenges Gilgamesh to stay awake for six days and seven nights. However, as soon as Utnapishtim finishes speaking Gilgamesh falls asleep. Utnapishtim instructs his wife to bake a loaf of bread for every day he is asleep so that Gilgamesh cannot deny his failure. Gilgamesh, who wants to overcome death, cannot even conquer sleep.

As Gilgamesh is leaving, Utnapishtim's wife asks her husband to offer a parting gift. Utnapishtim tells Gilgamesh of a boxthorn-like plant at the very bottom of the ocean that will make him young again. Gilgamesh obtains the plant by binding stones to his feet so he can walk on the bottom of the sea. He recovers the plant and plans to test it on an old man when he returns to Uruk. Unfortunately, when Gilgamesh stops to bathe it is stolen by a serpent that sheds its skin as it departs, apparently reborn. Gilgamesh, having failed both chances, returns to Uruk, where the sight of its massive walls provokes him to praise this enduring work of mortal men. The implication may be that mortals can achieve immortality through lasting works of civilization and culture.

== Flood myth section ==
Lines 1-203, Tablet XI (note: with supplemental sub-titles and line numbers added for clarity)

=== Ea leaks the secret plan ===
1. Utnapishtim tells Gilgamesh a secret story that begins in the old city of Shuruppak on the banks of the Euphrates River.
2. The "great gods" Anu, Enlil, Ninurta, Ennugi, and Ea were sworn to secrecy about their plan to cause the flood.
3. But the god Ea (Sumerian god Enki) repeated the plan to Utnapishtim through a reed wall in a reed house.
4. Ea commanded Utnapishtim to demolish his house and build a boat, regardless of the cost, to keep living beings alive.
5. The boat must have equal dimensions with corresponding width and length and be covered over like Apsu boats.
6. Utnapishtim promised to do what Ea commanded.
7. He asked Ea what he should say to the city elders and the population.
8. Ea tells him to say that Enlil has rejected him and he can no longer reside in the city or set foot in Enlil's territory.
9. He should also say that he will go down to the Apsu "to live with my lord Ea".

Note: 'Apsu' can refer to a freshwater marsh near the temple of Ea/Enki at the city of Eridu.

=== Building and launching the boat ===
1. Carpenters, reed workers, and other people assembled one morning.
2. [missing lines]
3. Five days later, Utnapishtim laid out the exterior walls of the boat of 120 cubits.
4. The sides of the superstructure had equal lengths of 120 cubits. He also made a drawing of the interior structure.
5. The boat had six decks [?] divided into seven and nine compartments.
6. Water plugs were driven into the middle part.
7. Punting poles and other necessary things were laid in.
8. Three times 3,600 units of raw bitumen were melted in a kiln and three times 3,600 units of oil were used in addition to two times 3,600 units of oil that were stored in the boat.
9. Oxen and sheep were slaughtered and ale, beer, oil, and wine were distributed to the workmen, like at a new year's festival.
10. When the boat was finished, the launch was very difficult. A runway of poles was used to slide the boat into the water.
11. Two-thirds of the boat was in the water.
12. Utnapishtim loaded his silver and gold into the boat.
13. He loaded "all the living beings that I had."
14. His relatives and craftsmen, and "all the beasts and animals of the field" boarded the boat.
15. The time arrived, as stated by the god Shamash, to seal the entry door.

=== The storm ===
1. Early in the morning at dawn a black cloud arose from the horizon.
2. The weather was frightful.
3. Utnapishtim boarded the boat and entrusted the boat and its contents to his boat master Puzurammurri who sealed the entry.
4. The thunder god Adad rumbled in the cloud and storm gods Shullat and Hanish went over mountains and land.
5. Erragal pulled out the mooring poles and the dikes overflowed.
6. The Anunnaki gods lit up the land with their lightning.
7. There was stunned shock at Adad's deeds which turned everything to blackness. The land was shattered like a pot.
8. All day long the south wind blew rapidly and the water overwhelmed the people like an attack.
9. No one could see his fellows. They could not recognize each other in the torrent.
10. The gods were frightened by the flood and retreated up to the Anu heaven. They cowered like dogs lying by the outer wall.
11. Ishtar shrieked like a woman in childbirth.
12. The Mistress of the gods wailed that the old days had turned to clay because "I said evil things in the Assembly of the Gods, ordering a catastrophe to destroy my people who fill the sea like fish."
13. The other gods were weeping with her and sat sobbing with grief, their lips burning, parched with thirst.
14. The flood and wind lasted six days and six nights, flattening the land.
15. On the seventh day, the storm was pounding [intermittently?] like a woman in labour.

=== Calm after the storm ===
1. The sea calmed and the whirlwind and flood stopped. All-day long there was quiet. All humans had turned to clay.
2. The terrain was as flat as a rooftop. Utnapishtim opened a window and felt fresh air on his face.
3. He fell to his knees and sat weeping, tears streaming down his face. He looked for coastlines on the horizon and saw a region of land.
4. The boat lodged firmly on mount Nimush which held the boat for several days, allowing no swaying.
5. On the seventh day he released a dove that flew away but came back to him. He released a swallow, but it also came back to him.
6. He released a raven that was able to eat and scratch, and did not circle back to the boat.
7. He then sent his livestock out in various directions.

=== The sacrifice ===
1. He sacrificed a sheep and offered incense at a mountainous ziggurat where he placed 14 sacrificial vessels and poured reeds, cedar, and myrtle into the fire.
2. The gods smelled the sweet odour of the sacrificial animal and gathered like flies over the sacrifice.
3. Then the great goddess arrived, lifted up her flies (beads), and said
4. "Ye gods, as surely as I shall not forget this lapis lazuli [amulet] around my neck, I shall be mindful of these days and never forget them! The gods may come to the sacrificial offering. But Enlil may not come, because he brought about the flood and annihilated my people without considering [the consequences]."
5. When Enlil arrived, he saw the boat and became furious at the Igigi gods. He said "Where did a living being escape? No man was to survive the annihilation!"
6. Ninurta spoke to Enlil saying "Who else but Ea could do such a thing? It is Ea who knew all of our plans."
7. Ea spoke to Enlil saying "It was you, the Sage of the Gods. How could you bring about a flood without consideration?"
8. Ea then accuses Enlil of sending a disproportionate punishment and reminds him of the need for compassion.
9. Ea denies leaking the god's secret plan to Atrahasis (= Utnapishtim), admitting only sending him a dream and deflecting Enlil's attention to the flood hero.

=== The flood hero and his wife are granted immortality and transported far away ===
1. Enlil then boards a boat and grasping Utnapishtim's hand, helps him and his wife aboard where they kneel. Standing between Utnapishtim and his wife, he touches their foreheads and blesses them. "Formerly Utnapishtim was a human being, but now he and his wife have become gods like us. Let Utnapishtim reside far away, at the mouth of the rivers."
2. Utnapishtim and his wife are transported and settled at the "mouth of the rivers".

== Last third of Tablet XI-Outline ==
In addition to the flood story material, (lines 1–203), tablet XI contains the following flood story elements:

List of titled subparts, Tablet XI-(by Kovacs):

The Story of the Flood–(1-203)
A Chance at Immortality–(204-240)
Home Empty-Handed–(241-265)
A Second Chance at Life–(266-309)

== Comparison between Atrahasis and Gilgamesh ==
These are some of the sentences copied more or less directly from the Atrahasis version to the Gilgamesh epic:

Atrahasis Epic	Gilgamesh Epic, tablet XI
"Wall, listen to me." Atrahasis III,i,20	"Wall, pay attention" Gilgamesh XI,22
"Like the apsu you shall roof it" Atrahasis III,i,29	"Like the apsu you shall roof it" Gilgamesh XI,31
"I cannot live in [your city]" Atrahasis III,i,47	"I cannot live in your city" Gilgamesh XI,40
"Ninurta went forth making the dikes [overflow]" Atrahasis U rev,14	"Ninurta went forth making the dikes overflow" Gilgamesh XI,102
"One person could [not] see another" Atrahasis III,iii,13	"One person could not see another" Gilgamesh XI,111
"For seven days and seven nights came the storm" Atrahasis III,iv,24	"Six days and seven nights the wind and storm flood" Gilgamesh XI,127
"He offered [a sacrifice]" Atrahasis III,v,31	"And offered a sacrifice" Gilgamesh XI,155
"the lapis around my neck" Atrahasis III,vi,2	"the lapis lazuli on my neck" Gilgamesh XI,164
"How did man survive the destruction?" Atrahasis III,vi,10	"No man was to survive the destruction" Gilgamesh XI,173

== Material altered or omitted ==
The Epic of Atrahasis provides additional information on the flood and flood hero that is omitted in Gilgamesh XI and other versions of the Ancient Near East flood myth. According to Atrahasis III ii, lines 40–47 the flood hero was at a banquet when the storm and flood began: "He invited his people ... to a banquet ... He sent his family on board. They ate and they drank. But he (Atrahasis) was in and out. He could not sit, could not crouch, for his heart was broken and he was vomiting gall."

According to Tigay, Atrahasis tablet III iv, lines 6–9 clearly identify the flood as a local river flood: "Like dragonflies they [dead bodies] have filled the river. Like a raft they have moved in to the edge [of the boat]. Like a raft they have moved in to the riverbank." The sentence "Like dragonflies they have filled the river." was changed in Gilgamesh XI line 123 to "Like the spawn of fishes, they fill the sea." Tigay holds that we can see the mythmaker's hand at work here, changing a local river flood into an ocean deluge.

Most other authorities interpret the Atrahasis flood as universal. A. R. George, and Lambert and Millard make it clear that the gods' intention in Atrahasis is to "wipe out mankind". The flood destroys "all of the earth". The use of a comparable metaphor in the Gilgamesh epic suggests that the reference to "dragonflies [filling] the river" is simply an evocative image of death rather than a literal description of the flood

Other editorial changes were made to the Atrahasis text in Gilgamesh to lessen the suggestion that the gods may have experienced human needs. For example, Atrahasis OB III, 30–31 "The Anunnaki, the great gods [were sitt]ing in thirst and hunger" was changed in Gilgamesh XI, line 113 to "The gods feared the deluge." Sentences in Atrahasis III iv were omitted in Gilgamesh, e.g. "She was surfeited with grief and thirsted for beer" and "From hunger they were suffering cramp."

These and other editorial changes to Atrahasis are documented and described in the book by Prof. Tigay (see below) who is associate professor of Hebrew and Semitic languages and literature in the University of Pennsylvania. Prof. Tigay comments: "The dropping of individual lines between others which are preserved, but are not synonymous with them, appears to be a more deliberate editorial act. These lines share a common theme, the hunger and thirst of the gods during the flood."

Although the 18th century BC copy of the Atrahasis (Atra-Hasis) epic post-dates the early Gilgamesh epic, we do not know whether the Old-Akkadian Gilgamesh tablets included the flood story, because of the fragmentary nature of surviving tablets. Some scholars argue that they did not. Tigay, for example, maintains that three major additions to the Gilgamesh epic, namely the prologue, the flood story (tablet XI), and tablet XII, were added by an editor or editors, possibly by Sin-leqi-unninni, to whom the entire epic was later attributed. According to this view, the flood story in tablet XI was based on a late version of the Atrahasis story.

== Alternative translations ==
As with most translations, especially from an ancient, dead language, scholars differ on the meaning of ambiguous sentences.

For example, line 57 in Gilgamesh XI is usually translated (with reference to the boat) as "ten rods the height of her sides", or "its walls were each 10 times 12 cubits in height". A rod was a dozen cubits, and a Sumerian cubit was about 20 inches. Hence these translations imply that the boat was about 200 feet high, which would be impractical with the technology in Gilgamesh's time (about 2700 BC). There is no Akkadian word for "height" in line 57. The sentence literally reads "Ten dozen-cubits each I-raised its-walls." A similar example from an unrelated house building tablet reads: "he shall build the wall [of the house] and raise it four ninda and two cubits." This measurement (about 83 feet) means wall length, not height.

Line 142 in Gilgamesh XI is usually translated as "Mount Niṣir held the boat, allowing no motion." Niṣir is often spelled Nimush, which is described as the newer reading. The Akkadian words translated "Mount Niṣir" are "KUR-ú KUR ni-ṣir". The word KUR could mean hill or country; it is capitalized because it is a Sumerian word. The first KUR is followed by a phonetic complement -ú which indicates that KUR-ú is to be read in Akkadian as šadú (hill) and not as mātu (country). Since šadú (hill) could also mean mountain in Akkadian, and scholars knew the Biblical expression Mount Ararat, it has become customary to translate šadú as mountain or mount. The flood hero was Sumerian, according to the WB-62 Sumerian King List. In Sumerian the word KUR's primary meaning is "mountain" as attested by the sign used for it. From the word mountain, the meaning "foreign country" is developed due to mountainous countries bordering Sumer. KUR in Sumerian also means "land" in general. The second KUR lacks a phonetic complement and is therefore read in Akkadian as mātu (country). Hence, the entire clause reads "The hill/mound country niṣir held the boat".

Lines 146-147 in Gilgamesh XI are usually translated as "I ... made sacrifice, incense I placed on the peak of the mountain." Similarly "I poured out a libation on the peak of the mountain." But Kovacs provides this translation of line 156: "I offered incense in front of the mountain-ziggurat." Parpola provides the original Akkadian for this sentence: "áš-kun sur-qin-nu ina UGU ziq-qur-rat KUR-i" Áš-kun means I-placed; sur-qin-nu means offering; ina-(the preposition) means on-(upon); UGU means top-of; ziq-qur-rat means temple tower; and KUR-i means hilly. Parpola's glossary (page 145) defines ziq-qur-rat as "temple tower, ziggurat" and refers to line 157 so he translates ziq-qur-rat as temple tower in this context. The sentence literally reads "I placed an offering on top of a hilly ziggurat." A ziggurat was an elevated platform or temple tower where priests made offerings to the temple god. Most translators of line 157 disregard ziq-qur-rat as a redundant metaphor for peak. There is no authority for this other than previous translations of line 157. Kovacs' translation retains the word ziggurat on page 102.

One of the Sumerian cities with a ziggurat was Eridu located on the southern branch of the Euphrates River next to a large swampy low-lying depression known as the apsû. The only ziggurat at Eridu was at the temple of the god Ea (Enki), known as the apsû-house. In Gilgamesh XI, line 42 the flood hero said "I will go down [the river] to the apsû to live with Ea, my Lord."

Lines 189–192 (lines 198–201) in Gilgamesh XI are usually translated as "Then ^{god}Enlil came aboard the boat. He took hold of my hand and brought me on board. He brought aboard my wife and made her kneel at my side. Standing between us, he touched our foreheads to bless us." In the first sentence "Then dingir-kabtu came aboard the boat" the Akkadian determinative dingir is usually translated as "god", but can also mean "priest" Dingir-kabtu literally means "divine important-person". Translating this as Enlil is the translator's conjecture.

== See also ==
- Atrahasis
- Babylonian and Assyrian religion
- Deluge
- Enûma Eliš
- Epic of Gilgamesh
- Noah's Ark
- Panbabylonism
- Ziusudra

== Bibliography ==
- Tigay, Jeffrey H. (1982), The Evolution of the Gilgamesh Epic, University of Pennsylvania Press, Philadelphia, ISBN 0-8122-7805-4
- W. G. Lambert and A. R. Millard, Atrahasis: The Babylonian Story of the Flood, Eisenbrauns, 1999, ISBN 1-57506-039-6.
- George, Andrew R., trans. & edit. (1999), The Epic of Gilgamesh (reprinted with corrections 2003 ed.), Penguin Books, ISBN 0-14-044919-1
- Kovacs, Maureen Gallery, transl. with intro. (1985–1989), The Epic of Gilgamesh, Stanford University Press: Stanford, California, ISBN 0-8047-1711-7 Glossary, Appendices, Appendix (Chapter XII=Tablet XII). A line-by-line translation (Chapters I-XI).
- Parpola, Simo, with Mikko Luuko, and Kalle Fabritius (1997), The Standard Babylonian, Epic of Gilgamesh, The Neo-Assyrian Text Corpus Project, ISBN 951-45-7760-4 (Volume 1) in the original Akkadian cuneiform and transliteration. Commentary and glossary are in English
- Heidel, Alexander (1946), The Gilgamesh Epic and Old Testament Parallels, University of Chicago, ISBN 0-226-32398-6
- Bailey, Lloyd R. (1989), Noah, the Person and the Story, South Carolina: University of South Carolina Press, ISBN 0-87249-637-6
- Best, Robert M. (1999), Noah's Ark and the Ziusudra Epic, Eisenbrauns, ISBN 0-9667840-1-4

Preceded by 15: Early writing tablet	A History of the World in 100 Objects; Object 16	Succeeded by 17: Rhind Mathematical Papyrus
