= Ziusudra =

King of Shuruppak (c. 2900 BC)

Ziusudra 𒍣𒌓𒋤𒁺
- First appearance: Sumerian King List c. 2000 BC

In-universe information
- Occupation: King (c. 2900 BC)
- Family: Ubara-Tutu (father)

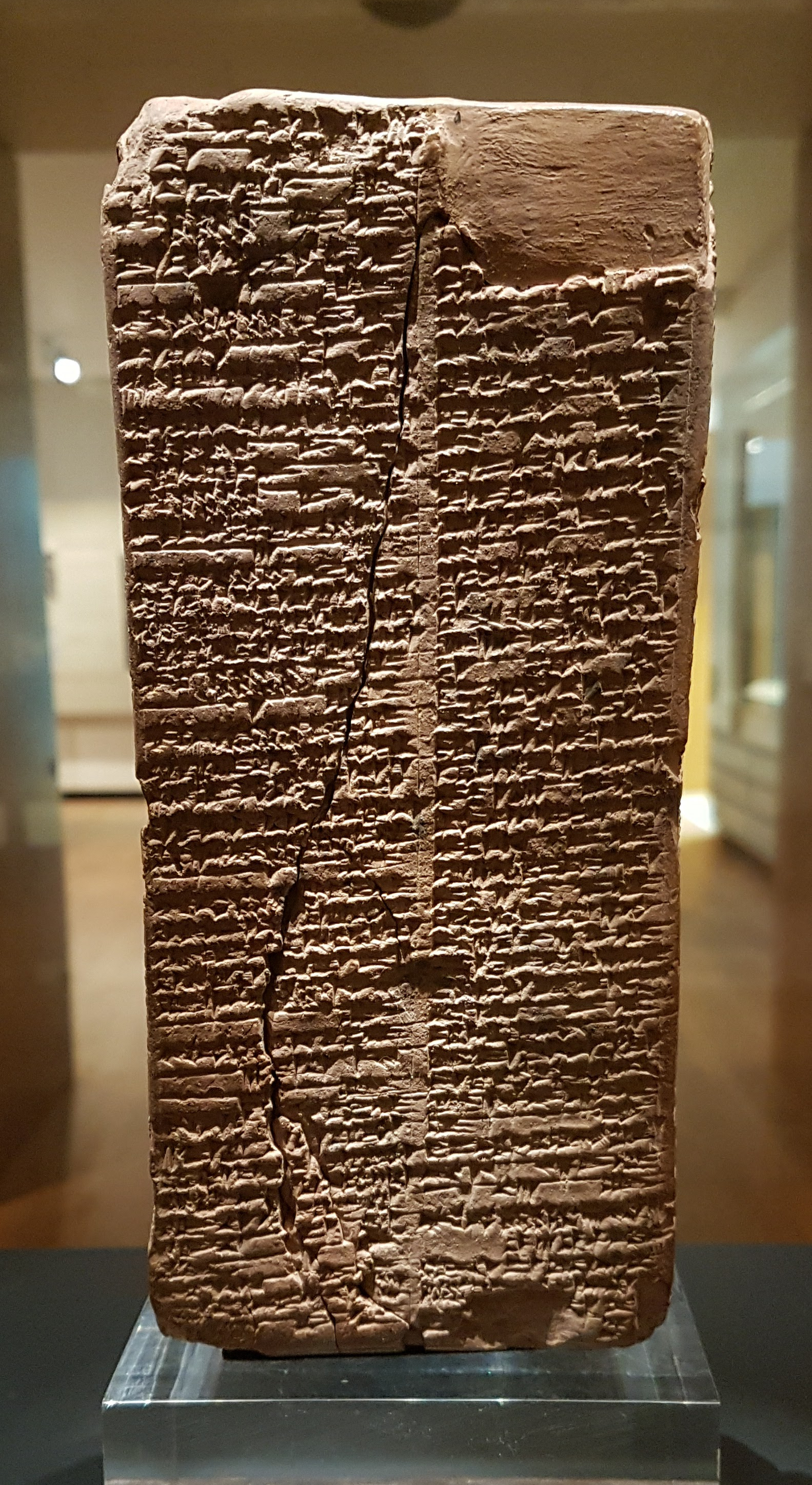
Sumerian King List, 1800 BC, Larsa, Iraq

Ziusudra (Old Babylonian Akkadian: 𒍣𒌓𒋤𒁺, romanized: Ṣíusudrá [ṣi₂-u₄-sud-ra₂], Neo-Assyrian Akkadian: 𒍣𒋤𒁕, romanized: Ṣísudda, Ancient Greek: Ξίσουθρος, romanized: Xísouthros) of Shuruppak is listed in the WB-62 Sumerian King List recension as the last king of Sumer prior to the Great Flood. He is subsequently recorded as the hero of the Eridu Genesis and appears in the writings of Berossus as Xisuthros.

Ziusudra is one of several mythic characters who are protagonists of Near Eastern flood myths, including Atrahasis, Utnapishtim, and the biblical Noah. Although each story displays its own distinctive features, many key story elements are common to two, three, or all four versions.

== Literary and archaeological evidence ==
=== King Ziusudra of Shuruppak ===
In the WB-62 Sumerian king list recension, Ziusudra, or Zin-Suddu of Shuruppak, is listed as son of the last king of Sumer before a great flood. He is recorded as having reigned as both king and gudug priest for ten sars (periods of 3,600 years), although this figure is probably a copyist error for ten years. In this version, Ziusudra inherited rulership from his father Ubara-Tutu, who ruled for ten sars.

The lines following the mention of Ziusudra read:

Then the flood swept over. After the flood had swept over, and the kingship had descended from heaven, the kingship was in Kish.

The city of Kish flourished in the Early Dynastic period soon after a river flood archaeologically attested by sedimentary strata at Shuruppak (modern Tell Fara), Uruk, Kish, and other sites, all of which have been radiocarbon dated to ca. 2900 BC. Polychrome pottery from the Jemdet Nasr period (ca. 30th century BC), which immediately preceded the Early Dynastic I period, was discovered directly below the Shuruppak flood stratum. Max Mallowan wrote that "we know from the Weld Blundell prism [i.e. WB-62] that at the time of the Flood, Ziusudra, the Sumerian Noah, was King of the city of Shuruppak where he received warning of the impending disaster. His role as a saviour agrees with that assigned to his counterpart Utnapishtim in the Gilgamesh Epic. ... both epigraphical and archaeological discovery give good grounds for believing that Ziusudra was a prehistoric ruler of a well-known historic city the site of which has been identified."

That Ziusudra was a king from Shuruppak is supported by the Gilgamesh XI tablet, which makes reference to Utnapishtim (the Akkadian translation of the Sumerian name Ziusudra) with the epithet "man of Shuruppak" at line 23.

=== Sumerian flood myth ===
The tale of Ziusudra is known from a single fragmentary tablet written in Sumerian, datable by its script to the 17th century BC (Old Babylonian Empire), and published in 1914 by Arno Poebel. The first part deals with the creation of man and the animals and the founding of the first cities Eridu, Bad-tibira, Larak, Sippar, and Shuruppak. After a missing section in the tablet, we learn that the gods have decided to send a flood to destroy mankind. The god Enki (lord of the underworld sea of fresh water and Sumerian equivalent of Babylonian god Ea) warns Ziusudra, the ruler of Shuruppak, to build a large boat; the passage describing the directions for the boat is also lost. When the tablet resumes, it is describing the flood. A terrible storm raged for seven days, "the huge boat had been tossed about on the great waters," then Utu (Sun) appears and Ziusudra opens a window, prostrates himself, and sacrifices an ox and a sheep. After another break, the text resumes, the flood is apparently over, and Ziusudra is prostrating himself before An (Sky) and Enlil (Lordbreath), who give him "breath eternal" and take him to dwell in Dilmun. The remainder of the poem is lost.

The Epic of Ziusudra adds an element at lines 258–261 not found in other versions, that after the flood "king Ziusudra ... they caused to dwell in the KUR Dilmun, the place where the sun rises". The Sumerian word "KUR" is an ambiguous word. Samuel Noah Kramer states that "its primary meanings is 'mountain' is attested by the fact that the sign used for it is actually a pictograph representing a mountain. From the meaning 'mountain' developed that of 'foreign land', since the mountainous countries bordering Sumer were a constant menace to its people. Kur also came to mean 'land' in general". The last sentence can be translated as "In the mountain of crossing, the mountain of Dilmun, the place where the sun rises".

A Sumerian document known as the Instructions of Shuruppak dated by Kramer to about 2600 BC, refers in a later version to Ziusudra. Kramer stated "Ziusudra had become a venerable figure in literary tradition by the middle of the third millennium B.C."

=== Xisuthros ===
Xisuthros (Ξίσουθρος) is a Hellenization of the Sumerian Ziusudra, known from the writings of Berossus, a priest of Bel in Babylon, on whom Alexander Polyhistor relied heavily for information on Mesopotamia. Among the interesting features of this version of the flood myth, are the identification, through interpretatio graeca, of the Sumerian god Enki with the Greek god Cronus, the father of Zeus; and the assertion that the reed boat constructed by Xisuthros survived, at least until Berossus' day, in the "Corcyrean Mountains" of Armenia. Xisuthros was listed as a king, the son of one Ardates, and to have reigned 18 saroi. One saros (shar in Akkadian) stands for 3,600 and hence 18 saroi was translated as 64,800 years. A saroi or saros is an astrological term defined as 222 lunar months of 29.5 days or 18.5 lunar years equal to 17.93 solar years.

=== Other sources ===
Ziusudra is also mentioned in other ancient literature, including The Death of Gilgamesh and The Poem of Early Rulers, and a late version of The Instructions of Shuruppak.

== See also ==
- History of Sumer

== Sources ==
- Best, R. M. (1999), Noah's Ark and the Ziusudra Epic, Eisenbrauns, ISBN 0-9667840-1-4
- Crawford, Harriet (1991), Sumer and the Sumerians, Cambridge University Press, ISBN 978-052138175-8
- Dalley, Stephanie (2008), Myths from Mesopotamia, p. 110
- "ETCSLtranslation: t.1.8.1.3 The death of Gilgameš", The Electronic Text Corpus of Sumerian Literature, Faculty of Oriental Studies, University of Oxford, 2006
- "ETCSLtranslation: t.5.2.5 The poem of early rulers", The Electronic Text Corpus of Sumerian Literature, Faculty of Oriental Studies, University of Oxford, 2006
- "ETCSLtranslation: t.5.6.1 The instructions of Šuruppag", The Electronic Text Corpus of Sumerian Literature, Faculty of Oriental Studies, University of Oxford, 2006
- Jacobsen, Thorkild (1939), The Sumerian King List, University of Chicago Press, pp. 75 and 76, footnotes 32 and 34
- Kramer, Samuel Noah (1961), "Sumerian Mythology: Miscellaneous Myths", Internet Sacred Text Archive, University of Pennsylvania Press
- Kramer, Samuel Noah (1967), "Reflections on the Mesopotamian Flood" (PDF), Expedition Magazine, vol. 9, no. 4, Penn Museum, p.16, col.2, archived from the original (PDF) on 19 June 2021
- Lambert, W. G.; Millard, A. R. (1999), Atrahasis: The Babylonian Story of the Flood, Eisenbrauns, ISBN 1-57506-039-6
- Langdon, S. (1923), "The Chaldean Kings Before the Flood", Journal of the Royal Asiatic Society
- Mallowan, M.E.L. (1964), "Noah's Flood Reconsidered", Iraq, 26 (2): 62–82, doi:10.2307/4199766, JSTOR 4199766, S2CID 128633634
- Schmidt, Erik (1931), "Excavations at Fara", The Museum Journal, 22 (2): 193–217 – via Internet Archive
- "The Sumerian king list: translation", The Electronic Text Corpus of Sumerian Literature, Faculty of Oriental Studies, University of Oxford, n.d., archived from the original on 8 May 2008
- "Ziusudra", Oracc: The Open Richly Annotated Cuneiform Corpus

Preceded by Ubara-Tutu of Shuruppak	King of Sumer legendary, c. 2900 BC	Succeeded by Jushur of Kish
Preceded by Ubara-Tutu of Shuruppak	Ensi of Shuruppak legendary, c. 2900 BC	City flooded according to legend
