= Shuruppak =

Ancient Sumerian city

- Tell Fara
- Location within Iraq Location within Near East
- 31°46′39″N 45°30′35″E
- Type: archaeological site, human settlement
- Periods: Jemdet Nasr period, Early Dynastic period, Akkad period, Ur III period
- Location: Al-Qādisiyyah Governorate, Iraq
- Region: Sumer

Site notes
- Height: 9 metre
- Area: 120 hectare
- Excavation dates: 1900, 1902-1903, 1931, 1973, 2016-2018, 2022, 2024
- Archaeologists: Robert Koldewey, Friedrich Delitzsch, Erich Schmidt, Harriet P. Martin, Adelheid Otto, and Berthold Einwag

Shuruppak, also Šuruppak (Sumerian: 𒋢𒆳𒊒𒆠 Šuruppag^{KI}, SU.KUR.RU^{ki}, "the healing place"), modern Tell Fara, was an ancient Sumerian city situated about 55 kilometres (35 mi) south of Nippur and 30 kilometers north of ancient Uruk on the banks of the ancient course of the Euphrates river in Iraq's Al-Qādisiyyah Governorate. Shuruppak was dedicated to Ninlil, also called Sud (^{d}SU.KUR.RU), the goddess of grain and the air. The Early Dynastic IIIa period is also sometimes called the Fara period. Not to be confused with the Levantine archaeological site Tell el-Far'ah (South).

"Shuruppak" is sometimes also the name of a king of the city, legendary survivor of the Flood, and supposed author of the Instructions of Shuruppak".

== History ==
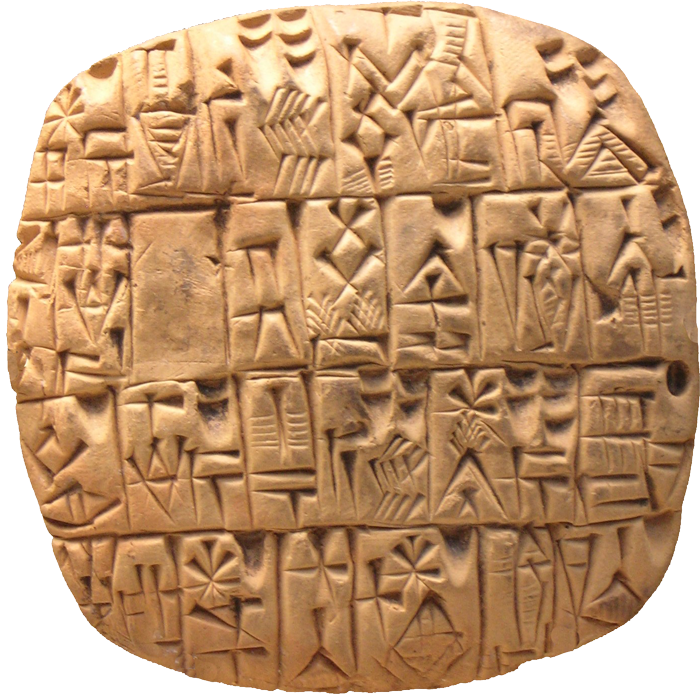
Summary account of silver for the governor written in Sumerian Cuneiform on a clay tablet. From Shuruppak, Iraq, circa 2500 BC. British Museum, London.

In the literary composition called the Sumerian King List a Shuruppak ruler, Ubara-Tutu, the last ruler "before the flood" is mentioned. In some versions he is followed by a son, Ziusudra. In the later versions of another Sumerian literary composition, the Epic of Gilgamesh, a man named Utnapishtim, son of Ubara-Tutu, is noted to be king of Shuruppak. This portion of Gilgamesh is thought to have been taken from another literary composition, the Myth of Atrahasis.

=== Jemdet Nasr period ===
The earliest excavated levels at Shuruppak date to the Jemdet Nasr period about 3000 BC. Several objects made of arsenical copper were found in Shuruppak/Fara dating to the Jemdet Nasr period (c. 2900 BC). Similar objects were also found at Tepe Gawra (levels XII-VIII).

=== Early Dynastic period ===
The city rose in importance and size, exceeding 40 hectares(0.4 km^{2}), during the Early Dynastic II period. The city expanded to its greatest extent at the end of the Early Dynastic III period (2600 BC to 2350 BC) when it covered about 100 hectares.

Cuneiform tablets from the Early Dynastic III period show a thriving, military oriented economy with links to cities throughout the region. It has been proposed that Fara was part of a "hexapolis" with Lagash, Nippur, Uruk, Adab, and Umma, possibly under the leadership of Kish. The texts show an administrative system involving the ensi (ensi_{2}(.GAR)), the temple of the goddess Sud, the palace (e_{2}-gal), the womens’ house (e_{2}-geme_{2}) and the town house ((e_{2}-)uru). It has been proposed that in the Early Dynastic IIIa period Shuruppak had passed from the control of Kish to that of Uruk and was part of joint military operations against Kish (with Adab, Nippur, Lagaš, Umma) under the leadership of Uruk.

=== Akkadian period ===
In the Akkadian Period (c. 2334–2154 BC), Shuruppak was ruled by a governor holding the title patesi. Like most cities on the Euphrates, it declined during the Akkadian Empire. A clay cone from the Akkadian Empire period found at Shurappak read "Dada, governor of Suruppak: Hala-adda, gover[nor] of Suruppak, his son, laid the ... of the city gate of the goddess Sud". Two Akkadian Empire governors of Shuruppak are known, Dada and Hala-adda.

A regional survey indicated that in this period the course of the Euphrates river shifted away from Shruppak and toward Adab, beginning a decline in settlement in that area and eventually resulting in the city being abandoned after 2000 BC.

=== Ur III period ===
During Ur III period (c. 2112-2004 BC), the city was ruled by a governors (ensi_{2}) appointed by Ur. One is known to be Ur-nigar, son of Shulgi, one of the first rulers of Ur III. One of the tablets found at the site is dated by a year name to the beginning of the reign of Shu-Sin, next to last ruler of Ur III. A few governors of Shurappak under the Ur III Empire are known from contemporary epigraphic remains, Ku-Nanna, Lugal-hedu, Ur-nigin-gar, and Ur-Ninkura. In much later literary compositions several purported rulers are mentioned.

=== Middle Bronze I ===
A Isin-Larsa cylinder seal and several pottery plaques which may date to early in the second millennium BC were found at the site. Surface finds are predominantly Early Dynastic. In the 2nd year of Enlil-bani (c. 1860–1837 BC), ruler of Isin, a sage of Nippur is recorded as leaving an herbal medicine at Shurappak.

== Flood Myth ==
The report of the 1930s excavation mentions a layer of flood deposits at the end of the Jemdet Nasr period at Shuruppak. Shuruppak in Mesopotamian legend is one of the "antediluvian" cities and the home of King Utnapishtim, who survives the flood by making a boat beforehand. Schmidt wrote that the flood story of the Bible,

seems to be based on a very real event or a series of such, as suggested by the existence at Ur, at Kish, and now at Fara, of inundation deposits, which accumulated on top of human inhabitation. There is finally “the Noah story,” which may possibly symbolize the survival of the Sumerian culture and the end of the Elamite Jemdet Nasr culture.

The deposit is like that deposited by river avulsions, a process that was common in the Tigris–Euphrates river system.

== Archaeology ==
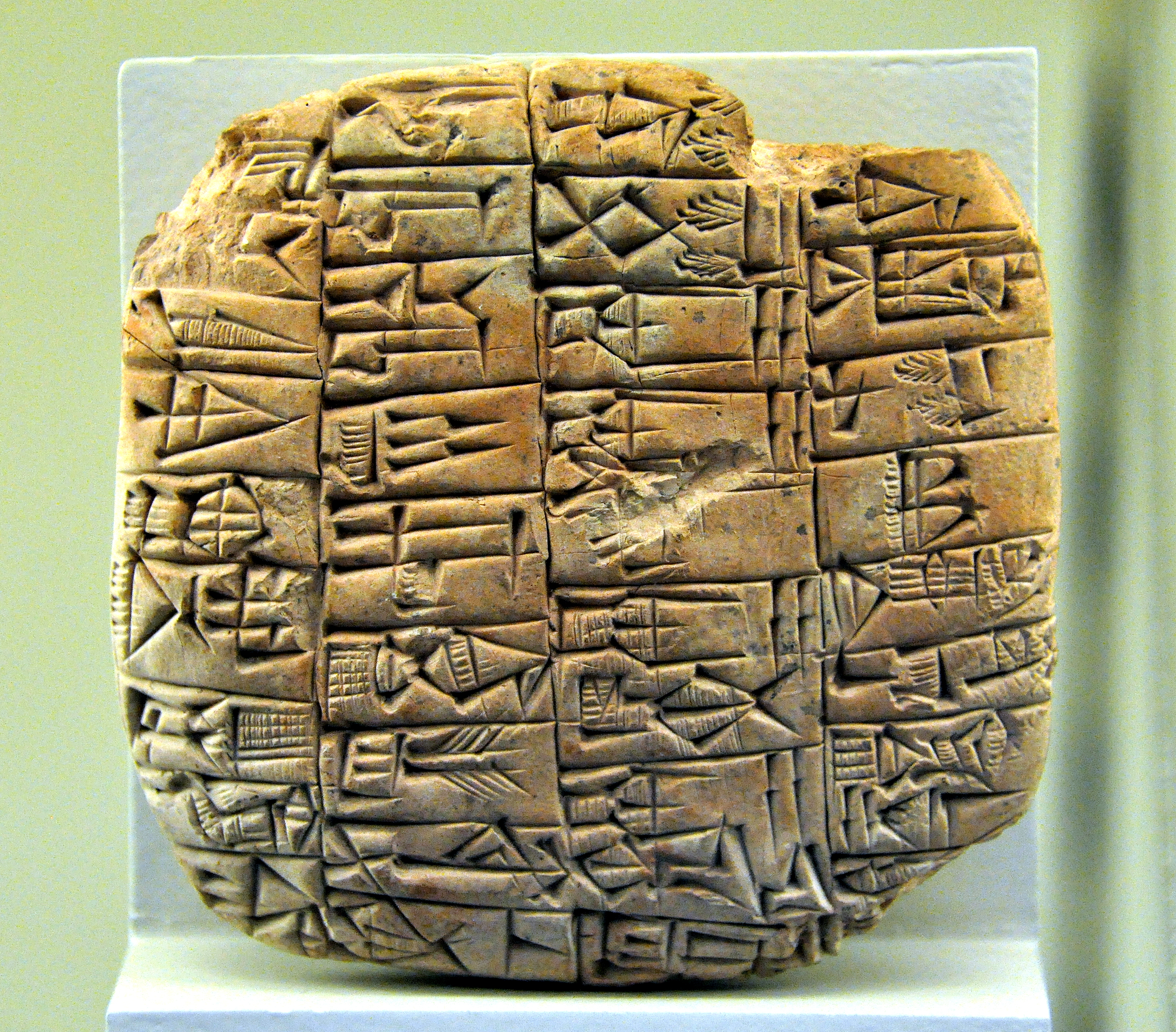
List of titles of different occupations, clay tablet from Shuruppak, Iraq. 2nd half of the 3rd millennium BC. Vorderasiatisches Museum, Berlin

Tell Fara extends about a kilometer from north to south. The total area is about 120 hectares, with about 35 hectares of the mound being more than three meters above the surrounding plain, with a maximum of 9 meters. The site consists of a main mound (Mound F) as well as a lower town which rises to low secondary mounds (sometimes called areas) in several places (Mounds A, B, C, D and G). Mound B lies to the east of the main mound separated by the 5 to 20 meter wide ancient canal bed, Mound E to the south-west past the large rivercourse, A to the north, D to the west, and G to the south-east. It was visited by William Loftus in 1850. Hermann Volrath Hilprecht conducted a brief survey in 1900. He found "copper goatheads; a copper, pre-Sargonid sword; a lamp in the shape of a bird; a very archaic seal cylinder; a number of pre-Sargonid tablets, and 60 incised plates of mother of pearl".

It was first excavated between June 1902 and March 1903 by Walter Andrae, Robert Koldewey and Friedrich Delitzsch of the German Oriental Society for eight months. They used a new "modern" system which involved excavating trenches 8 feet wide and 5 feet deep every few yards running across the entire width of the larger mound. If a building wall was found in a trench it was further explored. Preliminary identification of the site as Šuruppak came from a Ur III period clay nail which mentioned "Haladda, son of Dada, the patesi of Shuruppak (written SU.KUR.RU^{ki}) repaired the ADUS of the Great Gate of the god Shuruppak (written ^{d}SU.KUR.RU-da)". Among other finds, 847 cuneiform tablets and 133 tablet fragments (generally called the "Fāra texts") of Early Dynastic IIIa "Fara" period (c. 2600–2475 BC) were collected, which ended up in the Berlin Museum and the Istanbul Museum. They included administrative, legal, lexical, and literary texts. Over 100 of the tablets dealt with the disbursement of rations to workers. About a thousand Early Dynastic clay sealings and fragments (used to secure doors and containers) were also found. Most from cylinder seals but 19 were from stamp seals. In 1903 the site was visited by Edgar James Banks who was excavating at the site of Adab, a four-hour walk to the north. Banks took photographs of the German trenches and noted a 20 foot in diameter well, constructed with plano-convex bricks, in the center of the larger mound as well as an arched sewer, similarly constructed. The latter was where tablets were found. Banks also noted that the smaller mound held a cemetery.

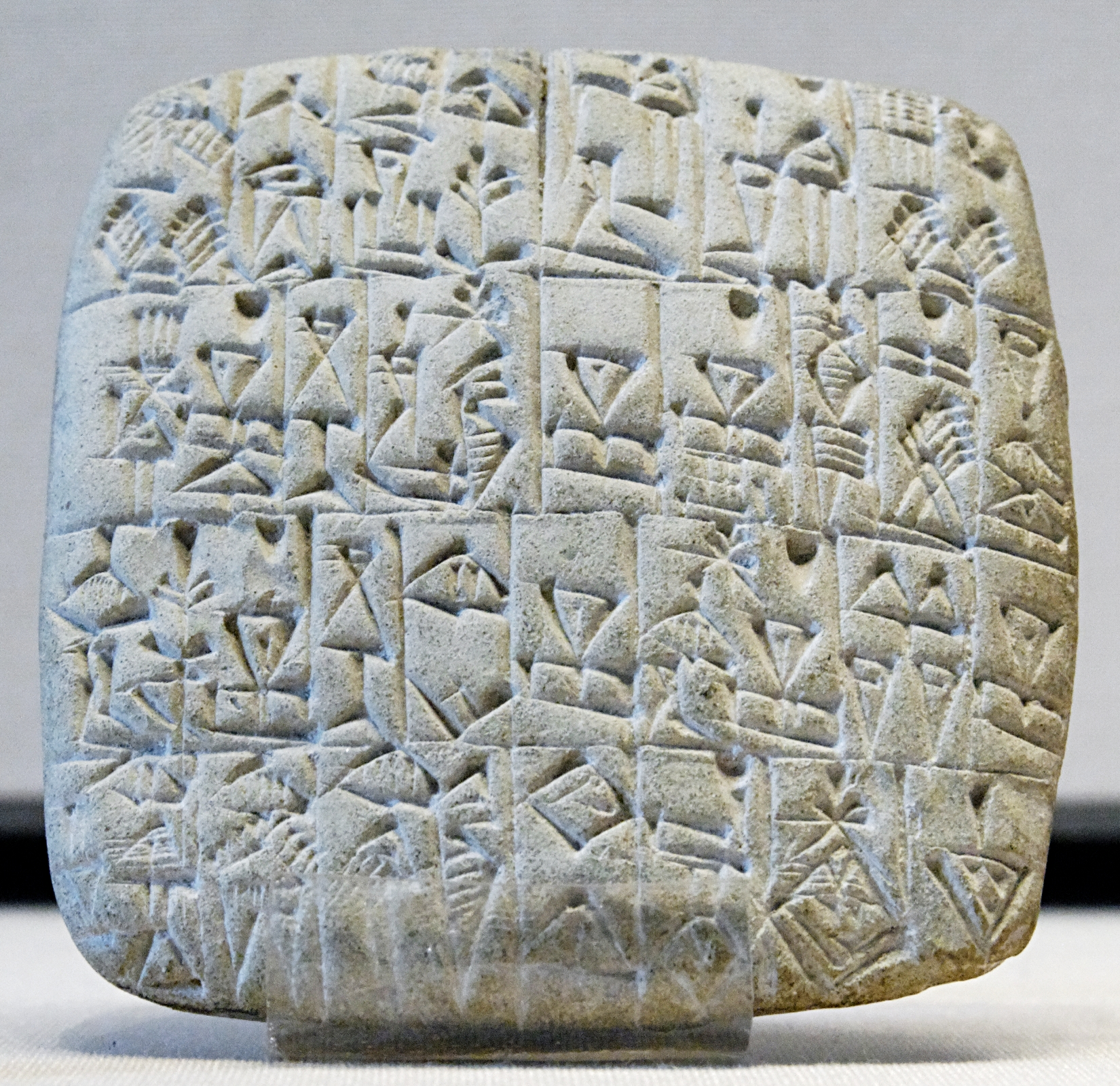
Bill of sale Louvre AO3765

In 1926 it was visited by Raymond P, Dougherty during his archaeological survey of the region. In March and April 1931, a joint team of the American Schools of Oriental Research and the University of Pennsylvania excavated Shuruppak for a further six week season, with Erich Schmidt as director and with epigraphist Samuel Noah Kramer being prompted by reports of illicit excavations in the area. They were able to stratify the major occupation levels as Jemdat Nasr (Fara I), Early Dynastic (Fara II), and Ur III empire (Fara III). There was an "inundation event" between Fara I and Fara II. The excavation recovered 96 tablets and fragments—mostly from pre-Sargonic times—biconvex, and unbaked. The tablets included reference to Shuruppak enabling confirmation of the sites original name.

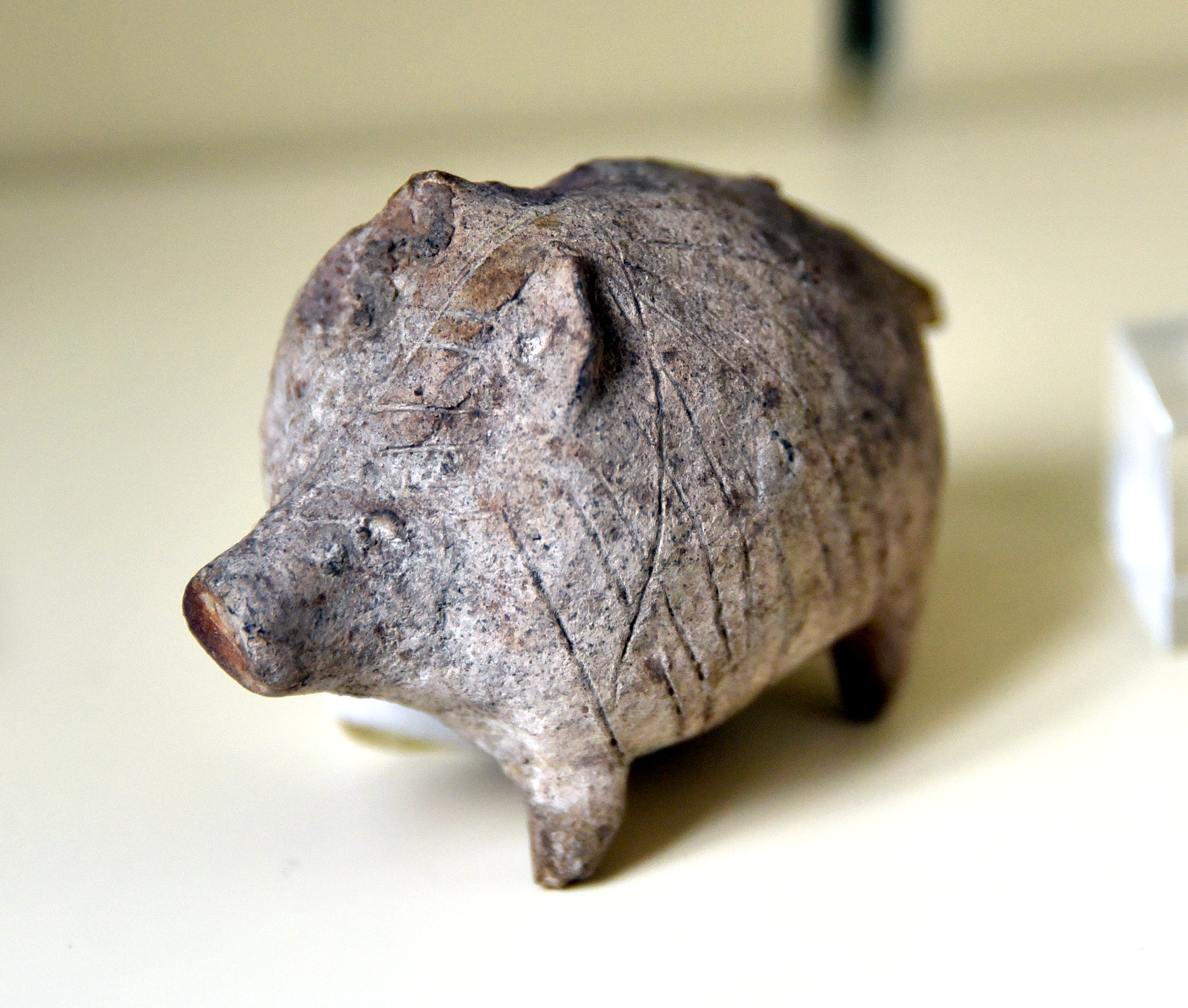
Pig-shaped rattle from Shuruppak, Iraq. Baked clay. Early Dynastic period, 2500-2350 BC. Vorderasiatisches Museum, Berlin

In 1973, a three-day surface survey of the site was conducted by Harriet P. Martin. Consisting mainly of pottery shard collection, the survey confirmed that Shuruppak dates at least as early as the Jemdet Nasr period, expanded greatly in the Early Dynastic period, and was also an element of the Akkadian Empire and the Third Dynasty of Ur.

A surface survey of the site was completed was conducted between 2016 and 2018 by a team from LMU Munich led by Adelheid Otto and Berthold Einwag. The initial work was under the regional QADIS survey. A drone was used to create a digital elevation model of the site. A full geophysical survey was conducted in 2018 and 2022 by a team led by Jörg Faßbinder, finding several canals running through the city and a harbor. The researchers found thousands of robber holes left by looters which had disturbed surface in many places, with the top several meters of the main mound destroyed. They were able to use remains of the 900 meter long trench left by excavators in 1902 and 1903 to orient old excavation documents and aerial mapping with their geomagnetic results. Part of the site was inaccessible because of the spoil heaps from the excavations. A city wall was found (in Area B), which had been missed in the past. In the section the wall ranged from 5 meters to 15 meters wide. A harbor and quay were also found.

Further excavations seasons occurred in 2022 and 2024 by a team from the Ludwig-Maximilians-Universität München. Three areas were excavated. On Mound B a number of ED IIIa sun-dried mudbrick houses were found with two being excavated. A few "Fāra-style ED (IIIa)" door sealings were recovered. On the main mound (Mound F) a building first noted in the 1902 excavation (in Trench III a-c) and deemed a possible temple and determined to be a multi-room complex measuring 160 meters by 120 meters was examined. A wide paved road running along one very wide building wall was found. It is thought that only the ED I level of the complex remains due to extensive looting beginning in that area in the 1850s. Lastly an area on the north of the main mound where a large number of door sealing had earlier been found was examined on the assumption that there was an administrative building was nearby. Work occurred in an area where the early German excavators found over 1000 seal impressions from about 500 seals (trench Id/Ie), in an area now heavily looted out. The seals covered a wide period, Jemdet Nasr, ED I and ED II so it was assumed the area was a rubbish dump. A location was chosen where sand encroachment had somewhat deterred the robbers. a trench was excavated measuring 4 meters long by 3 meters wide, to a depth of 2.5 meters without reaching virgin soil. A total of 180 clay sealings were found often matching those earlier excavated including an unusually large seal (3.5 centimeters) in the "Elegant Style". Portable X-ray fluorescence (pXRF) analysis of clay sealings suggested that rather than being deposited over a long period of time all of the various seal styles were being used at the same time.

== See also ==
- Instructions of Shuruppak
- List of cities of the ancient Near East
- List of Mesopotamian deities
- List of Mesopotamian dynasties
