= Utnapishtim =

Important character of the Epic of Gilgamesh

Utnapishtim 𒌓𒍣
- Utnapishtim Makes Offering to the Gods by Allan Stewart, 1916
- First appearance: Sumerian King List c. 2000 BC
- Last appearance: Epic of Gilgamesh c. 1200 BC

In-universe information
- Occupation: King of Shuruppak (c. 2900 BC)
- Family: Ubara-Tutu (father)

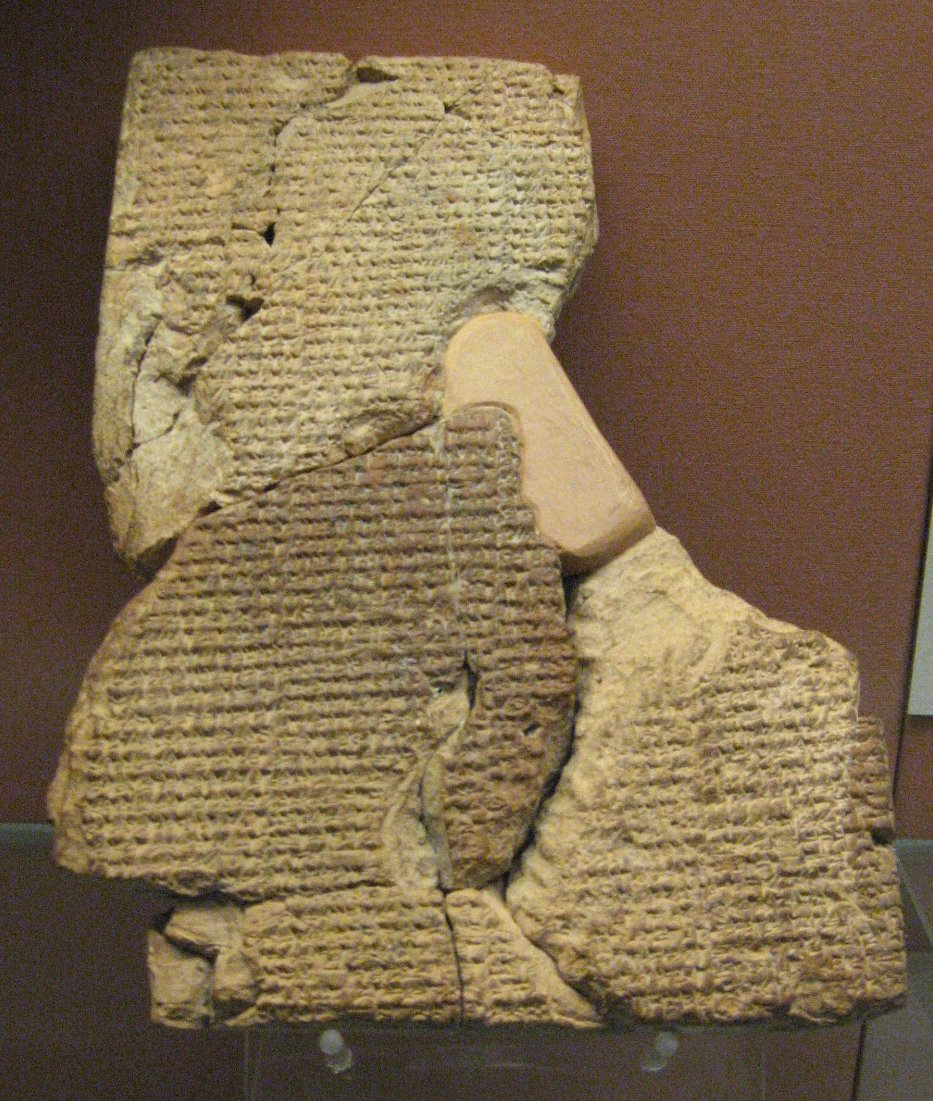
Cuneiform tablet with the Atra-Hasis epic in the British Museum

Uta-napishtim or Utnapishtim (Akkadian: 𒌓𒍣, "he has found life") was a legendary mortal king of the ancient city of Shuruppak in southern Iraq who, according to the Gilgamesh flood myth, survived the Flood by making and occupying a boat.

He is called by different names in different traditions: Ziusudra ("Life of long days", rendered Xisuthros, Ξίσουθρος in Berossus) in the earliest, Sumerian versions, later Shuruppak (after his city), Atra-hasis ("exceedingly wise") in the earliest Akkadian sources, and Uta-napishtim ("he has found life") in later Akkadian sources such as the Epic of Gilgamesh. His father was the king Ubar-Tutu ("Friend of the god Tutu").

Uta-napishtim is the eighth of the antediluvian kings in Mesopotamian legend. He would have lived around 2900 BC, corresponding to the flood deposit at Shuruppak between the Jemdet Nasr and Early Dynastic levels.

In Mesopotamian narratives he is the Flood Hero, tasked by the god Enki (Akkadian Ea) to create a giant ship to be called Preserver of Life in preparation for a giant flood that will wipe out all life. The character appears in Tablet XI of the Standard Babylonian Epic of Gilgamesh, at the culmination of Gilgamesh's search for immortality. The story of Uta-napishtim has drawn scholarly comparisons due to the similarities between it and the storylines about Noah in the Book of Genesis.

== Story ==
Uta-napishtim is tasked by the god Enki to abandon his worldly possessions and create a giant ship to be called Preserver of Life. In Erra and Išum, Marduk is said to have been the originator of the flood and the Seven Sages.

The Preserver of Life was made of solid timber, so that the rays of Shamash (the sun) would not shine in, and of equal dimensions in length and width. The design of the ship was supposedly drawn on the ground by Enki, and the frame of the ark, which was made in five days, was 200 feet in length, width and height, with a floor-space of one acre. The ark interior had seven floors, each floor divided into 9 sections, finishing the ark fully on the seventh day. The entrance to the ship was sealed once everyone had boarded the ship.

He was also tasked with bringing his wife, family, and relatives along with the craftsmen of his village, baby animals, and grains. The oncoming flood would wipe out all animals and people not on the ship. After twelve days on the water, Uta-napishtim opened the hatch of his ship to look around and saw the slopes of Mount Nisir, where he rested his ship for seven days. On the seventh day, he sent a dove out to see if the water had receded, and the dove could find nothing but water, so it returned. Then he sent out a swallow, and just as before, it returned, having found nothing. Finally, Uta-napishtim sent out a raven, and the raven saw that the waters had receded, so it circled around, but did not return. Uta-napishtim then set all the animals free, and made a sacrifice to the gods.

The gods came, and because he had preserved the seed of man while remaining loyal and trusting of his gods, Uta-napishtim and his wife were given immortality, as well as a place among the heavenly gods. Enki (Ea) also claims that he did not tell "Atrahasis" (apparently referring to Uta-napishtim) about the flood, but rather that he only made a dream appear to him.

== Role in the epic ==
In the epic, overcome with the death of his friend Enkidu, the hero Gilgamesh sets out on a series of journeys to search for his ancestor Uta-napishtim (Xisouthros) who lives at the mouth of the rivers and has been given eternal life.

Uta-napishtim counsels Gilgamesh to abandon his search for immortality, but gives him a trial to stay awake for a week if he wishes to obtain immortality. When Gilgamesh inevitably falls asleep, Uta-napishtim next tells him about a plant that can make him young again. Gilgamesh obtains the plant from the bottom of the sea in Dilmun (often considered to be current-day Bahrain) but a serpent steals it, and Gilgamesh returns home to the city of Uruk, having abandoned hope of either immortality or renewed youth.

== See also ==
- Atra-Hasis
- Deucalion
- Flood myth
- Noah
- Ziusudra
