= Ubara-Tutu =

Mythological antediluvian king of Sumer

Ubara-Tutu 𒁛𒁺𒁺
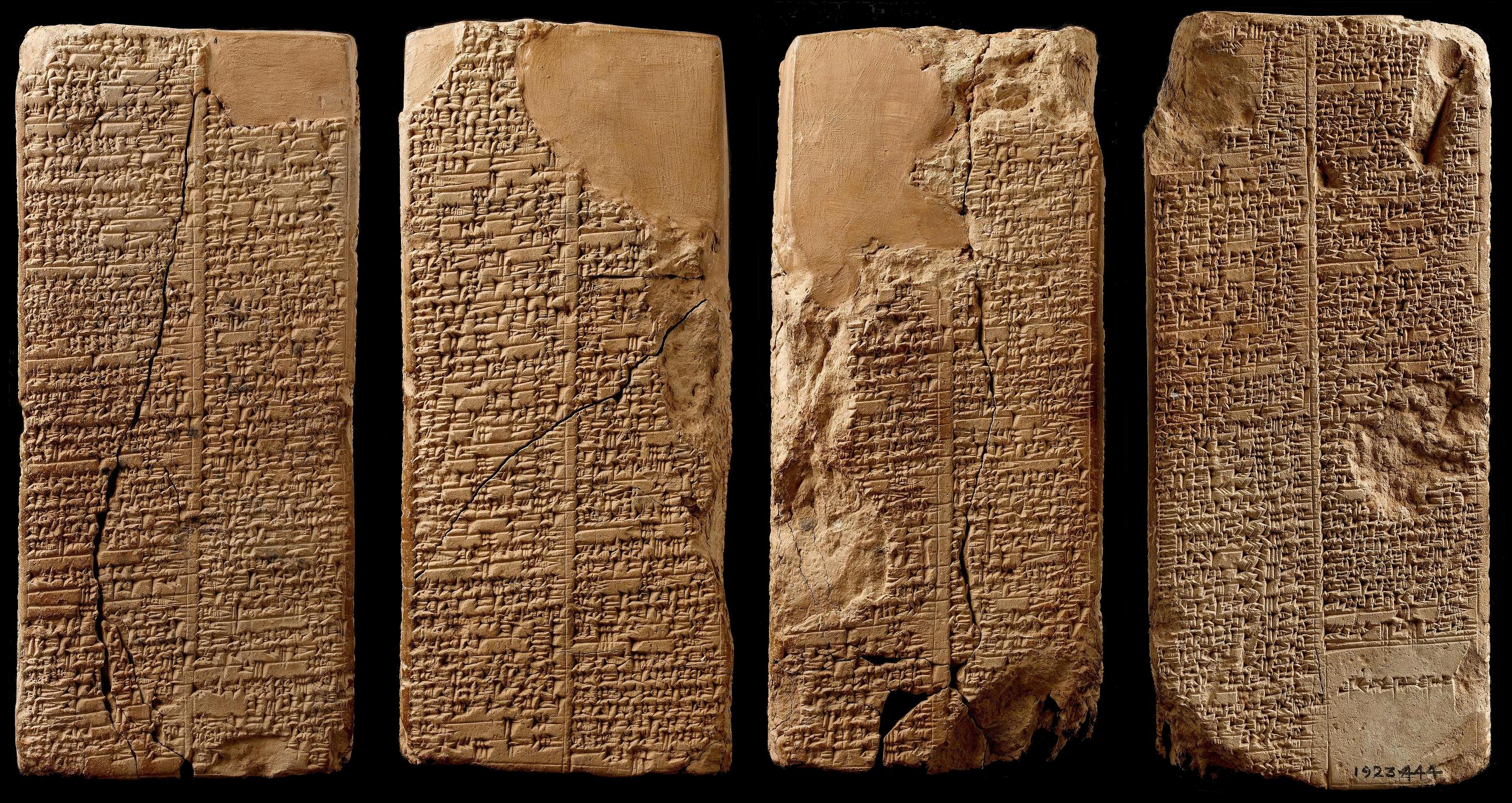
- The Weld-Blundell Prism is among the oldest, most well-preserved, and better-known versions of the Sumerian King List, and includes the inscription for Ubara-Tutu
- First appearance: Sumerian King List; c. 2000 BC

In-universe information
- Occupation: King of Shuruppak (reigned c. 18,600 years)
- Family: En-men-dur-ana (father)
- Children: Utnapishtim

Ubara-tutu (or Ubartutu) of Shuruppak was the last antediluvian king of Sumer, according to some versions of the Sumerian King List. He was said to have reigned for 18,600 years (5 sars and 1 ner). He was the son of En-men-dur-ana, a Sumerian mythological figure often compared to Enoch, as he entered heaven without dying. Ubara-Tutu was the king of Sumer until a flood swept over his land.

Ubara-tutu is briefly mentioned in tablet XI of the Epic of Gilgamesh. He is identified as the father of Utnapishtim, a character who is instructed by the god Ea to build a boat in order to survive the coming flood.

== See also ==
- History of Sumer
- List of Mesopotamian dynasties

== Bibliography ==
- Ashmolean (2017). "Sumerian king list". Ashmolean Museum.
- Black, Jeremy Allen; Baines, John Robert; Dahl, Jacob L.; Van De Mieroop, Marc (2006) [c. 1900–1600 BC]. Cunningham, Graham; Ebeling, Jarle; Flückiger-Hawker, Esther; Robson, Eleanor; Taylor, Jon; Zólyomi, Gábor (eds.). "The Sumerian king list". Faculty of Oriental Studies. Electronic Text Corpus of Sumerian Literature (ETCSL) (in Sumerian). Translated by Jacobsen, Thorkild Peter Rudolph; Glassner, Jean-Jacques; Römer, Willem H. Ph.; Zólyomi, Gábor (revised ed.). United Kingdom of Great Britain and Northern Ireland: University of Oxford. "After the kingship descended from heaven, the kingship was in Eridug. In Eridug, Alulim became king; he ruled for 28800 years. Alaljar ruled for 36000 years. 2 kings; they ruled for 64800 years. Then Eridug fell and the kingship was taken to Bad-tibira. In Bad-tibira, En-men-lu-ana ruled for 43200 years. En-men-gal-ana ruled for 28800 years. Dumuzid, the shepherd, ruled for 36000 years. 3 kings; they ruled for 108000 years. Then Bad-tibira fell (?) and the kingship was taken to Larag. In Larag, En-sipad-zid-ana ruled for 28800 years. 1 king; he ruled for 28800 years. Then Larag fell (?) and the kingship was taken to Zimbir."
- Sjöberg, Åke Waldemar; Leichty, Erle; Tinney, Steve (2021) [2003]. "Pennsylvania Sumerian Dictionary Project". Pennsylvania Sumerian Dictionary Project (PSD).
