= Ninisina =

Mesopotamian goddess of medicine

- Divine physician
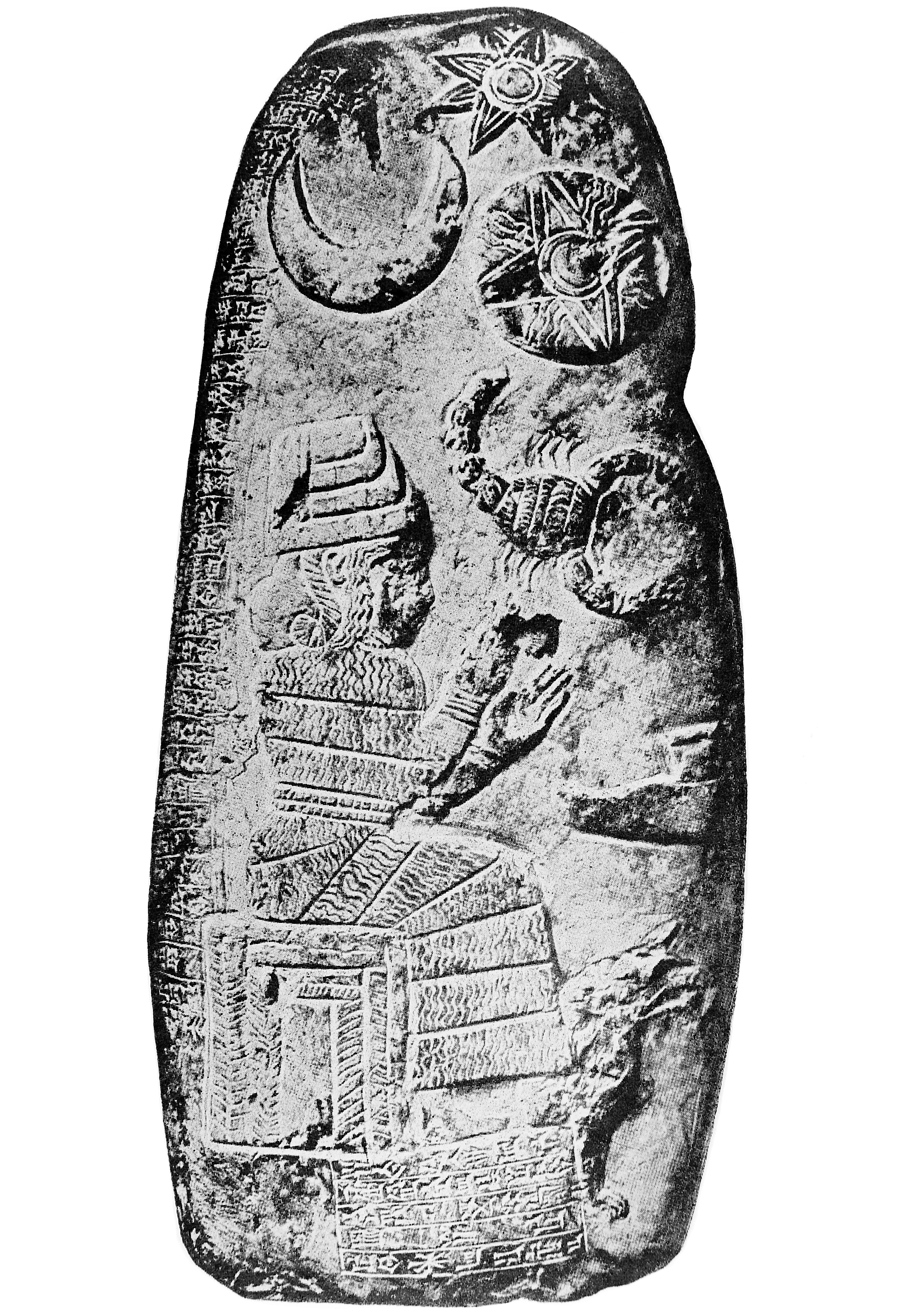
- A healing goddess with a dog on a kudurru
- Major cult center: Isin
- Symbol: dog, scalpel

Genealogy
- Parents: Anu and Urash
- Spouse: Pabilsag
- Children: Damu, Gunura and Šumaḫ

Equivalents
- Sippar and Terqa: Ninkarrak
- Umma: Gula
- Nippur: Nintinugga

Ninisina (Sumerian: "Mistress of Isin") was a Mesopotamian goddess who served as the tutelary deity of the city of Isin. She was considered a healing deity. She was believed to be skilled in the medical arts, and could be described as a divine physician or midwife. As an extension of her medical role, she was also believed to be capable of expelling various demons. Her symbols included dogs, commonly associated with healing goddesses in Mesopotamia, as well as tools and garments associated with practitioners of medicine.

While Ninisina was initially considered to be an unmarried and childless goddess, the god Pabilsag eventually came to be viewed as her husband. Her children were Damu and Gunura, like her considered to be healing deities, as well as Šumaḫ, who also served as her sukkal, a type of divine attendant. Further members of her court included Ninarali, a goddess associated with the underworld, harpist goddesses Ninigizibara and Ninḫinuna, and sometimes Ninshubur. Ninisina also developed associations with various other goddesses of similar character, including Ninkarrak, Gula and Nintinugga. However, while they were often considered analogous, they originated in different areas of Mesopotamia and their individual traits differed. A further goddess connected with her was Bau, who might have developed into a healing goddess because of the association between them. For political reasons, Ninisina also acquired some traits originally belonging to Inanna when the kings of Isin lost control over the cult center of the latter goddess, Uruk.

The oldest evidence of the worship of Ninisina comes from Isin from the Early Dynastic period. She is also attested in a number of texts from the Sargonic period, including an inscription of Manishtushu. Many references to her appear in the archives of the Third Dynasty of Ur. In addition to Isin, she was also worshiped in Larak, Nippur and Lagash in these periods. In the following Isin-Larsa period, she served as the royal goddess of the dynasty of Isin, and was invoked in the titles of kings belonging to it. They also patronized temples dedicated to her. Furthermore, she was introduced to Larsa, Uruk and Ur at this time. In the Old Babylonian period, the construction of temples dedicated to her is mentioned in texts attributed to kings of Babylon and Kish. However, Isin was eventually abandoned during the reign of Samsu-iluna, and was only rebuilt by Kurigalzu I. Not much is known about the veneration of Ninisina after that, though she appears in inscriptions of Adad-apla-iddina and continued to be worshiped as late as in the Neo-Babylonian period.

Many works of Mesopotamian literature mention Ninisina. One of them, Ninisina's Journey to Nippur, which had both monolingual and bilingual (Sumero-Akkadian) versions, is considered unique due to its detailed description of a divine procession. Many hymns were dedicated to her, including some connected to specific rulers, such as Ishbi-Erra of Isin. Multiple laments in which she mourns either the loss of her city, her son Damu, or both are known too. She is also attested in other types of texts, such as prayers and god lists.

== Character and iconography ==
The theonym Ninisina can be translated as "Queen of Isin" or "Mistress of Isin." Sumerian names of deities were often a combination of the cuneiform sign NIN and either a toponym, as in this case, or a term referring to an object or product. Some forty percent of earliest attested Sumerian deities bore names formed following this pattern. While "nin" is often translated as a feminine noble title, it was grammatically neutral and can be found in the names of male deities as well, for example Ningirsu, Ninazu and Ningublaga, in which case it instead means "lord." Multiple variants of the second element of Ninisina's name are attested, leading to spellings such as ^{d}Nin-ezen^{(ki)} or ^{d}Nin-IN (logographic) in addition to phonetic ones such as ^{d}Nin-i_{3}-si-na, but it is agreed that in all cases it refers to the city of Isin. As indicated by her name, she served as the tutelary goddess of this city. In some cases, this role could overshadow her other functions. An inscription of a king of Isin, most likely Enlil-bani, which was found in Nippur refers to Isin as "the city which the gods An and Enlil gave to the goddess Ninisina." Local rulers (the dynasty of Isin) derived their authority from her, and in art she was depicted handing the "rod-and-ring symbol" over to them, which was a function attributed to major deities in many other polities: Nanna or Inanna in Ur in the Ur III period, Ishtar in Mari during the reign of Zimri-Lim, or Shamash in sources from the reign of Hammurabi. Her importance did not depend on a connection to any other deity. Instead, her growth in prominence was tied to the rise of Isin as a political center.

Ninisina was associated with healing, and was believed to be skilled at various medical practices. She could be referred to as an asû. This term is typically translated as "physician." Most likely, this was meant to indicate that she had power over all forms of healing. Surgical procedures performed to her, for example cleaning of wounds and application of bandages, were described in Mesopotamian literature. According to textual sources, she wore a "great robe" (tug_{2} gal), possibly a type of protective garment associated with practitioners of medicine. Furthermore, a scalpel could serve as her symbol. A hymn directly describes her using both this tool and a lancet while treating a wound. Her hands were described as "soothing." She could be called šuḫalbi, "cold-handed one," or ama šuḫalbi, "soft-handed mother." Most likely, this reflected the fact that touch was understood as a key element of healing. She was also believed to be familiar with medicinal plants, as well as with the mythical "plant of life," which is well known from the Epic of Gilgamesh. She was also associated with birth, and various texts implore her to take the role of a midwife, with one hymn outright describing her as "the exalted woman, midwife of heaven and earth." However, her role was distinct from that of a goddess of birth, as in Mesopotamia deities who belonged to this category were only believed to shape the fetus, which was compared to various crafts in epithets ("lady carpenter," "lady potter"). The word ama, "mother," is applied to Ninisina as a title in one of the Temple Hymns. However, Julia M. Asher-Greve notes that caution is necessary when evaluating the origin of such epithets, as they did not necessarily refer to motherhood in the biological sense, but rather to a given deity's authority and high position in the pantheon, similar as the analogous masculine ones. According to Manuel Ceccarelli, in Ninisina's case it metaphorically reflects her role as a divine midwife. Texts from the third millennium refer to her as ama arḫuš, "merciful mother," which according to Irene Sibbing-Plantholt also points at a connection with midwifery. This phrase is also attested as an epithet of Gula, Ninkarrak and Bau, and as a name of a separate goddess worshiped in Seleucid Uruk. Sibbing-Plantholt concludes that Ninisina was perceived as a "motherly healer." According to Barbara Böck, the fact that Ninisina was seemingly strongly associated with health problems affecting the digestive tract might reflect the fact that the belly was already a body part associated with her activity due to her connection to infants.

According to Irene Sibbing-Plantholt, a further extension of Ninisina's character as a healing goddess was her association with incantations and ascribing the ability to expel demons to her. A hymn states that she was able to counter the influence of various demonic beings, such as Dimme, Dimmea, Asag and Namtar. Barbara Böck singles out the last of them in particular as her frequent opponent in textual sources. One text lists an "evil lamma," ^{d}lama hul, among demons she was believed to expel. Lamma was normally understood as a type of benevolent protective minor goddess, but this reference, while it does not reflect a common tradition, is not unique. Another mention of "evil lamma" is known from an incantation addressed to Hendursaga. Ninisina was believed to intercede with Anu and Enlil on behalf of the personal deities of people attacked by demons as well.

Aside from being a healing deity, Ninisina was also believed to use illnesses to punish transgressions, though known depictions do not portray her as a punishing goddess.

An inscription of Adad-apla-iddina from Isin refers to Ninisina as the "wisest of the gods" (gašam dingir-re-e-ne). A fragmentary hymn states that she was given wisdom, as well as measuring tools meant to let her keep track of levees and ditches, by Enlil and Ninlil, who obliged her to keep track of these structures and additionally to "bring šuʾura bread and beer in front of them." According to Gábor G. Zólyomi, it might have also described other abilities bestowed upon her by them. An additional function attributed to Ninisina was that of a "cadastral director of An."

In art, Ninisina can be identified by the presence of a dog, much like Gula, and in some cases depictions of goddesses accompanied by this animal might represent either of these two deities. It has been proposed that the association between Mesopotamian healing goddesses and dogs was based on the belief in the healing properties of the saliva of these animals. However, as of 2022, no direct references to the presence of dogs in any healing rituals were known, and there is also no textual evidence for any beliefs attributing healing properties to them. An alternate possibility is that dogs were considered liminal beings who were able to interact both with the living and the dead, which would be a property shared with healing goddesses. It is possible that the dogs serving Ninisina were believed to snatch away disease demons exposed by the procedures performed by the goddess.

== Associations with other deities ==
=== Family and court ===
Ninisina's parents were Anu and Urash. An inscription of Warad-Sin more precisely calls her Anu's firstborn child. However, according to Klaus Wagensonner statements directly identifying her as a daughter of these deities are not common. Enlil was regarded as her father-in-law.

Most likely Ninisina was initially considered to be an unmarried and childless goddess. No later than in the Ur III period Pabilsag came to be viewed as her husband. Hymns describe him as her "beloved spouse" and state that she "spent time joyously with him." Similar couples consisting of a healing goddess and a young warrior god were common in Mesopotamian religion. According to Irene Sibbing-Plantholt the marriage was most likely theologically motivated by the need to provide Ninisina with a spouse representing an ideologically significant city, rather than by shared primary function between her and Pabilsag, who was not a healing deity. According to Manfred Krebernik, like his wife he could be regarded as a divine cadastral officer. It is possible that the theonym Lugal-Isin referred to Pabilsag in his role as a husband of Ninisina. Sporadically an association between Ninisina and Ninurta is also attested, but there is no strong indication in known sources that they were regarded as a couple in their respective cult centers, Isin and Nippur.

Damu, Gunura and Šumaḫ were regarded as Ninisina's children Dietz Otto Edzard and Klaus Wagensommer refer to Pabilsag as their father, but Irene Sibbing-Plantholt notes that no text directly labels him this way. The origin of Damu and Gunura is uncertain, though it is assumed they did not belong to the pantheon of Isin at first. Dina Katz suggests that they might have been transferred to this city from a destroyed settlement which formerly served as their cult center. She also proposes that Damu only acquired his own character as a healing deity due to his new status as Ninisina's son, and that originally his primary role was that of a dying god comparable to Dumuzi and Ningishzida. However, Irene Sibbing-Plantholt proposes that both him and Gunura might have originally arisen as healing deities in their own right before they came to be associated with Ninisina. In a hymn, Damu is portrayed as a student of Ninisina who learned the healing arts from her.

Šumaḫ, whose name means "the one with the mighty hand," also functioned as his mother's sukkal (divine vizier) and according to the god list An = Anum as one of the five udug (in this context: protective spirits) of the temple Egalmaḫ. Ninisina's Journey to Nippur states that his duty was cleaning and purifying the streets of Isin for his mother. He is not to be confused with the similarly named goddess Ama-šumaḫ, the "housekeeper (abarakkat) of Ekur," though she was also associated with Ninisina. A further member of her court was Ninarali whose name, "lady of Arali," contains a poetic term for the underworld, which according to Barbara Böck might reflect Ninisina's own association with this sphere. According to Antonie Cavigneaux and Manfred Krebernik, it is possible that she is the some deity as ^{d}Nin-a-ra-[x] (last sign not preserved) from An = Anum (tablet VI, line 24), who might be a daughter of Ishum, and a gloss in a single text indicates the NIN sign in her name should be read as ereš or égi rather than phonetically as nin. At some point Ninshubur came to be incorporated into the circle of Ninisina in a local tradition from Isin. However, this goddess was usually associated with Inanna instead. Barbara Böck argues that the circles of these two goddesses overlapped, and cites the presence of Ninigizibara in the courts of them both as an example. This deity was regarded as a divine harpist. In Ninisina's Journey to Nippur, the goddess Ninḫinuna is referred to as her "beloved harp" instead. Her name can be translated as "lady abundance" or "lady of abundance," and she is also attested in association with Inanna and Gula. The latter tradition is presumed to be related to her portrayal as a courtier of Ninisina. Both Ningizibara and Ninḫinuna are grouped with Ninmeurur, "lady who collects all the me" (or "lady of the Meurur temple," a sanctuary of Nanaya in Uruk), a servant of Inanna, in the Isin god list.

=== Other healing goddesses ===
While the healing goddesses of the Mesopotamian pantheon - Ninisina, Nintinugga (associated with Nippur), Ninkarrak (worshiped especially in Terqa and Sippar ), Gula (possibly originally from Umma), Meme and Bau - were initially separate deities, they were at times either partially conflated or treated as equivalents of each other. The existence of multiple medicine goddesses reflects the fact that initially individual cities or regions had separate local pantheons. The fact that Ninisina, Gula and Ninkarrak occur separately in the Weidner god list is considered evidence in favor of assuming they were not conflated at the time of its composition. It has also been pointed out that the character of individual healing goddesses differs, despite the similarities. Most likely, the process of syncretism between them only started after the end of the third millennium BCE. In modern scholarship, Mesopotamian medicine goddesses are sometimes treated as fully interchangeable, with the theonym Gula used to refer to them collectively, but as noted by Irene Sibbing-Plantholt, this approach "does not do justice to the idiosyncratic, diverse characters" of the individual deities.

Ninisina was sometimes equated with Ninkarrak, with the latter's name being used in Akkadian translations of Sumerian texts about the former. Examples include Ninisina's Journey to Nippur as well as incantations. They also had the same parents, Anu and Urash, While Ninkarrak was usually considered to be unmarried, she could be associated with Pabilsag. She could also be viewed as the mother of Damu like Ninisina, however with the exception of a single bilingual text she was never associated with Gunura. In contrast with Ninisina, Ninkarrak was typically not perceived as motherly, and texts which describe her as a mother might be the result of the association between them. Additionally, despite their close connection, Ninkarrak was not worshiped in Isin before the end of the Old Babylonian period, and the attestations from later times are infrequent. A field in Sippar was interchangeably referred to as belonging to Ninkarrak and Ninisina, which might indicate that the latter, who was not worshiped in this city, was understood as a cognomen of the former locally. However, Joan Goodnick Westenholz concluded that Ninkarrak was overall a goddess of lesser importance than Ninisina.

Gula, later a distinct goddess, was possibly initially an epithet of Ninisina, as references to Ninisina-gula ("Ninisina, the great") occur in Neo-Sumerian (Ur III) sources and in a hymn from the reign of Ishbi-Erra. Gula's name could be used as a translation of Ninisina's in Akkadian versions of Sumerian compositions. She is also referred to as "Ninisina of Umma" in documents from Puzrish-Dagan, as the scribes from this location were more familiar with the latter goddess, and used her name to represent other healing deities. It has been argued this is more likely to reflect a convention similar to interpretatio graeca rather than theological syncretism between the two goddesses. Ninisina is entirely absent from known texts from Umma, and had no cult in this city, though in an inscription from the Ur III period the local governor Lu-Utu calls himself a son of this goddess. Barbara Böck argues that Ninisina was fully absorbed by Gula in the centuries following the reign of Ishbi-Erra, but according to Irene Sibbing-Plantholt the association between them is only attested in Isin after Hammurabi's conquest of the city, and Christina Tsouparopoulou states that it is not certain if they were viewed as identical in the Old Babylonian period. Ninisina is not listed among the goddesses conflated with Gula in the Gula Hymn of Bulluṭsa-rabi, which was most likely composed between 1400 BCE and 700 BCE. An inscription which still mentions them as separate goddesses is known from the Neo-Babylonian period. While both Ninisina and Gula could be associated with Damu, the former came to be viewed as his mother earlier than the latter.

In Nippur, Ninisina came to be associated with Nintinugga, and both of them were referred to with the epithet Nintilaʾuga, "the one who revives the dead" there. Additionally, both of them were associated with Damu and Gunura. However, while texts which treat them as analogous are known, they were not necessarily conflated with each other, as a text mentions Nintinugga traveling to visit Ninisina in her main temple. Furthermore, Nintinugga was never called a daughter of Anu, and there is no indication she was associated with the spouses of other similar goddesses.

A further goddess who came to be closely associated with Ninisina was Bau. She was originally the goddess of Girsu, and was also worshiped elsewhere in the state of Lagash. She could be addressed with titles originally associated with the goddess of Isin in hymns. However, in early sources, such as inscriptions of Uru'inimgina, she is not yet a healing deity, but rather a "lifegiving, motherly figure," and it is possible she only acquired the former role due to syncretism with Ninisina. Manuel Ceccarelli notes that the connection between Bau and Ninisina developed in parallel to that between their respective husbands, Ningirsu (equated with Ninurta) and Pabilsag. He proposes this might indicate they were equated to more closely tie them to the circle of Enlil. He points out that starting with Ishme-Dagan kings of Isin started to show interest in Nippur and its god, and on this basis argues the motive for the development of a network of syncretic associations was in this case politically motivated. An alternate possibility is that Bau came to be conflated with Ninisina due to the decline of Lagash occurring at roughly the same time as the ascent of Isin to prominence, which might have led to the decline of her individual cult. Unlike Ninisina, Bau was usually not invoked in incantations, and there is no indication she was believed to be an adversary of any specific demons. She was also not associated with dogs.

=== Other instances of syncretism ===
The hymn "Ninisina and the gods" is an early example of identification of one deity with multiple other ones. In addition to Bau, Ninisina is equated in it with Gatumdug (the tutelary goddess of Lagash) and Nungal. It has been argued other early sources might also indicate similar links between her and deities such as Ningirida and Ninsun.

A special case of syncretism occurred between Ninisina and Inanna for political reasons when Isin lost control over Uruk. Identification of its tutelary goddess with Inanna, who served as a source of royal power, was likely meant to serve as a theological remedy to this problem. In this context Ninisina was regarded as analogous to similarly named Ninsianna ("red lady of heaven," Venus), sometimes treated as a manifestation of Inanna. The lasting result of this process was an exchange of attributes between the two goddesses involved, with Ninisina acquiring a warlike aspect and Inanna being occasionally associated with healing. An overlap between their epithets has been noted as well. Julia M. Asher-Greve argues the association between Ninisina and the rod-and-ring symbol attested in Isin was another aspect of it, and points out a possibly related passage occurs in a hymn which describes how her various roles were bestowed upon her by Enlil and Ninlil.

Irene Sibbing-Plantholt proposes Ninisina was also conflated with Gašan-ašte. She assumes that this goddess was the original spouse of Pabilsag, though the only sources attesting her existence come from the Old Babylonian period or later.

== Worship ==
The earliest attestations of Ninisina come from the Early Dynastic period, and include oath formulas from Isin, an entry in the god list from Fara, and a passage from the Zame Hymns. Her temple in Isin was the Egalmaḫ, "exalted palace," which already existed in the third millennium BCE. Multiple other sanctuaries dedicated to her bore the same name. In the Sargonic period, she appears in an inscription of Manishtushu on a macehead. Additionally, one of the Temple Hymns is dedicated to her. Furthermore, she is mentioned in texts from Adab, though only in a field name and in a single seal inscription. She was also introduced to Nippur in this period at the latest, though she did not play a large role in the local pantheon. She might have nonetheless had a shrine in the Ekur.

Ninisina is well attested in sources from the Ur III period. A document from Puzrish-Dagan from Ibbi-Sin’s reign attests that offerings in Isin were made to her and her family: Pabilsag, Gunura, Damu and Šumaḫ. In the same period she was also worshiped in Larak, where she had a temple. She was also worshiped in the Erabriri, "house of the shackle which holds in check," a temple of Pabilsag. It is known that Ninisina's temples had official administrators in the Ur III period, as indicated by the seal of a certain Amar-Damu known from an impression on a document from Nippur, which designates him as the "šabra of Ninisina." In some cases physicians were involved in her cult. One example is Ubartum, a woman considered to be the single best documented female practitioner of medicine from ancient Mesopotamia. Alongside the cup-bearer (sagi) Šulgi-bāni she was responsible for the distribution of fattened sheep meant to be offered to Ninisina. An offering list from Lagash separately lists Ninisina-gula ("the great") and Ninisina-namtur ("the small"). She was also worshiped in this city alongside Pabilsag, possibly due to the close association between various healing goddesses and their respective spouses.

In the Isin-Larsa period the worship of Ninisina continued. In Isin, she played a role in royal ideology. Kings from the dynasty of Isin such as Ishbi-Erra, Shu-Ilishu, Enlil-bani and Zambiya referred to themselves as "the beloved of the god Enlil and the goddess Ninisina." Sîn-Māgir instead used the title "called by the name by the god Nanna, favorite of the goddess Ninisina" in an inscription, while Damiq-ilishu called himself "the prince beloved of the heart of the goddess Ninisina." Shu-Ilishu in an inscription commemorating the construction of the walls of Isin attributes the success of this project to "the great love of/for the goddess Ninisina." Iddin-Dagan dedicated a statue to her, and in the accompanying inscription refers to her as his lady, and to Damu as his lord, imploring them to curse anyone who would try to damage it. A certain Enlil-enam dedicated a dog statuette to Ninisina for the life of Bur-Suen.

The Egalmaḫ is the most commonly mentioned temple in documents from Isin. Enlil-bani also built a new temple for her in Isin, the Eurgira, "dog house." Andrew R. George argues that it was a dog kennel rather than a sanctuary, though this view is not universally accepted. Excavations revealed the presence of multiple dog skeletons, as well as figures and sheets of worked bronze depicting these animals, in the same city. The Esabad, the "house of the open ear," or possibly "house of the opening of bodily cords," was another temple of Ninisina located in Isin or close to it according to Irene Sibbing-Plantholt, though George suggests it might have been instead located in Larak. Ninisina was still venerated in this city during the reign of Ishbi-Erra, at which point it might have only had a religious function. The kings of Isin might have also introduced Ninisina to Uruk, displacing Gula, who was worshiped there earlier. Sîn-kāšid built a temple of Ninisina in Uruk, and in the inscription commemorating this event refers to her as "the incantation priestess of the numerous people, chief physician of black-headed" and as his lady. This sanctuary bore the ceremonial name Egalmaḫ.

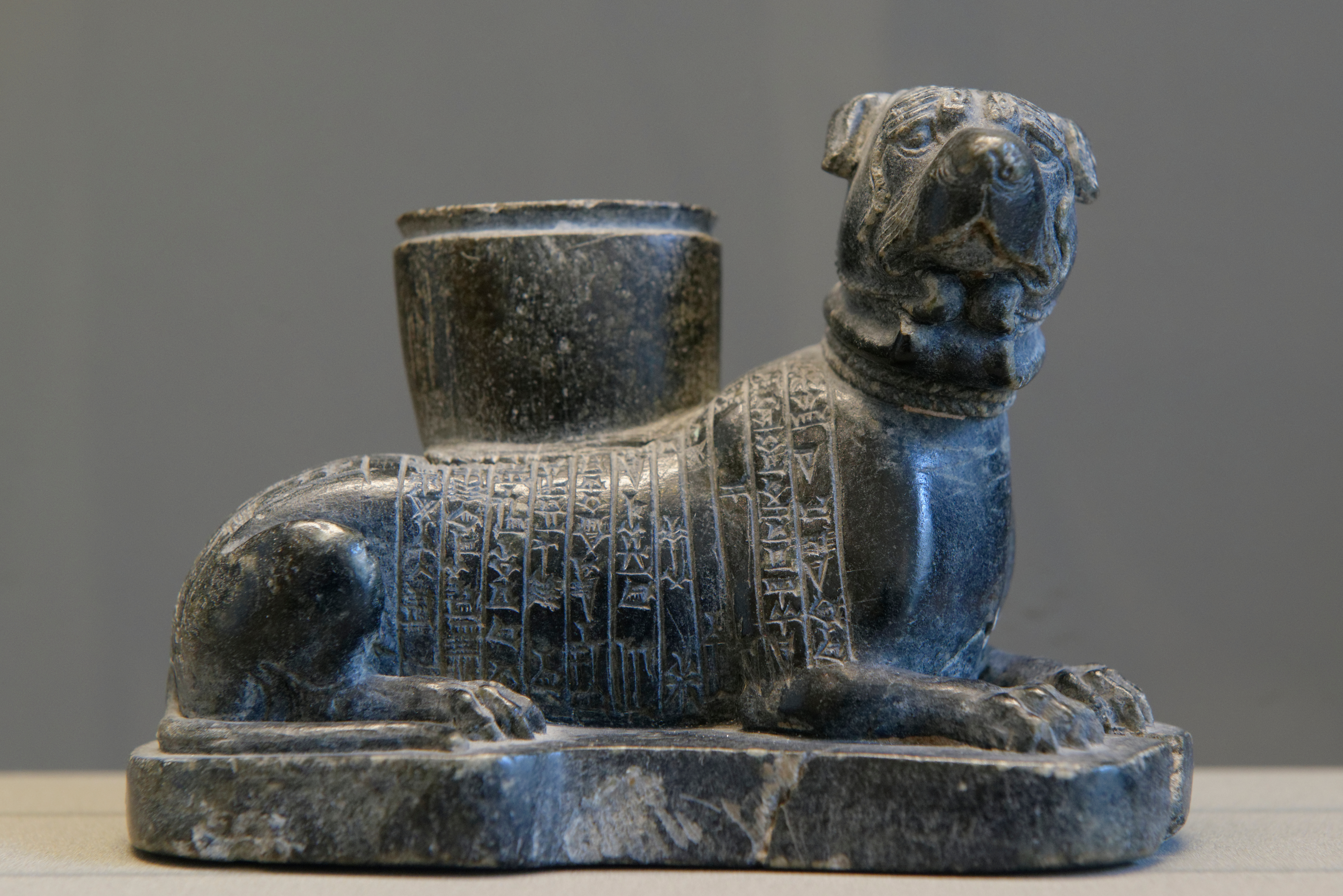
Votive statuette of a dog dedicated to Ninisina for the life of Sumuel of Larsa.

In the same period, Ninisina was also introduced to Larsa. A certain Abba-duga from Girsu (Telloh) dedicated a dog statue to Ninisina for the life of Sumuel, who reigned in the nineteenth century BCE. He refers to her as "the wise physician" and as his lady and states that the statue is to be called "Faithful dog, a stand for a pot of life-giving medication." This work of art is considered the oldest known piece of evidence indicating that Ninisina could be associated with dogs. King Gungunum rebuilt the Eunamtila, the "house of the herbs of life," a temple dedicated to Ninisina located in Larsa. Another king of this city, Warad-Sin, built a temple of Ninisina in Ur. It bore the name Egalmaḫ. In a commemorative inscription he stated that he hopes this pious act will result in the goddess granting him a long life and a joyful reign. Since the worship of Ninisina is not otherwise attested in Ur, it has been suggested that the goddess venerated in this temple was actually Gula, though evidence is lacking, and it possible that the goddess of Isin might have only been introduced to this city by Warad-Sin. The same king also rebuilt the Eunamtila like his predecessor. Rim-Sîn I in an inscription commemorating the construction of a temple of Ningishzida in Ur refers to Ninisina as the "lady of my strength." Since it also invokes many other deities (Anu, Enlil, Ninlil, Ninurta, Nuska, Enki, Ninḫursag, Nanna, Utu, Ishkur, Nergal, Inanna and Ninšenšena), Odette Boivin suggests that it reflected the "newly achieved supra-regional extent" of his kingdom.

Old Babylonian king Sumu-abum built a temple dedicated to Ninisina in Babylon. According to Andrew R. George, while it is left unnamed in inscriptions, it most likely corresponds to the Egalmaḫ, which in later periods served as a temple of Gula. Sumu-ditana of Kish also built a temple of Ninisina, but its ceremonial name and location are unknown. Julia M. Asher Greve states that temples of both Ninisina and Ninkarrak existed in Sippar, but Irene Sibbing-Plantholt in a more recent publication concludes that she was not worshiped in this city. The inscription on a seal of a certain Tishpak-nasir, a servant of king Ibal-pi-El I of Eshnunna, states that his father bore the name Ur-Ninisina. Through much of the Old Babylonian period, Ninisina's cult was in decline, though she continued to be worshiped in Babylon, Kisurra, Kish, Lagash and Uruk. However, during the reign of Samsu-iluna Isin itself declined, and was eventually abandoned. After the city was rebuilt by Kurigalzu I of the Kassite dynasty, Gula became its main goddess, though Ninisina also continued to be worshiped there. While the aforementioned king referred to the Egalmaḫ as a temple of Gula, later rulers consistently treated Ninisina as the goddess of Isin during building projects undertaken there. For example, Adad-apla-iddina later restored the temple for Ninisina (^{d}Nin-ezen-na), as evidenced by information stamped on multiple bricks from the site. The same king in a single inscription refers to her as his mother. Little is known about the worship of Ninisina after the Old Babylonian period otherwise, though she appears as a distinct goddess as late as in the Neo-Babylonian period.

== Literature ==
Many literary compositions focused on Ninisina are known.

=== Ninisina's Journey to Nippur ===
A mythical journey of Ninisina is described in the bilingual composition "Nin-Isina's Journey to Nippur." The genre of the text is identified as a šir_{3}-nam-šub, argued to be a term referring either to an "incantation hymn" or to a composition focused on determination of destiny. An older monolingual Sumerian version is known, and it is not certain when the Akkadian translation, which replaces Ninisina with Ninkarrak, was added. Colophons of known bilingual exemplars indicate that they were copied from originals from Babylon and Nippur. The scribes responsible for their preparation were the brothers Marduk-balāssu-ēriš and Bēl-aḫa-iddina, who credit a certain Iqīša-Ninkarrak as the author. They were most likely active during the reign of Tiglath-Pileser I, and their father Ninurta-uballissu was a scribe in the Assyrian royal court, though the family might have originated in Babylonia.

The text gives a detailed description of a procession following the goddess, including her husband Pabilsag, their children Damu and Gunura (either acting as or accompanied by Alad-šaga, "good spirit"), the inhabitants of Isin, "lord Nunamnir" (Enlil) on the left of the goddess, and Udug-šaga ("protective spirit"), identified as "father of Enlil," on her right. According to Wilfred G. Lambert, multiple traditions regarding Enlil's parentage are known, and his father could variously be Anu, Lugaldukuga or possibly the primordial deity Enmesharra. Šumaḫ, the third child of Ninisina and Pabilsag, designated as "the right messenger of the Egalmaḫ," was placed in front of his mother, leading the procession. No other equally detailed descriptions of processions are known from Sumerian literature, even though journeys of deities are the topic of many compositions. The rest of the text briefly describes a visit of the goddess in Nippur, gifts she presents to the city's master Enlil, and the declaration of a good destiny for her. It is followed by a lacuna of 10 lines, and when the text resumes, Ninisina and Pabilsag enter the Egalmaḫ, sit on a dais and listen to the music performed by Ninḫinuna. The final passages appear to mention a banquet in honor of her held in Isin attended by Anu, Enlil, Enki and Ninmah.

=== Hymns and prayers ===
A šir-gida (literally "long song") composition dedicated to Ninisina states that she invented the šuba stones, perhaps to be identified as carnelian, for Inanna. The pursuit of knowledge needed to create them is described in the following terms: "[Ninisina] concerned herself with things that otherwise one does not bother with, directed her attention to things that otherwise one does not do." It also describes how she taught the medical arts, according to this source bestowed upon her by Enki, to her son Damu, whom she addresses with the words "My son, pay attention to everything medical! Damu, pay attention to everything medical! You will be praised for your diagnoses." Furthermore, it highlights her role as a midwife, which is in this context linked to a description of her own birth. While it is attested elsewhere that midwives could also function as wetnurses, this function is not mentioned in the hymn. According to Jeremy Black, the final section of the text deals with "Ninisina's adventures as a warrior goddess in Enlil's service." She is described as a "strong heroine" who strikes fear into the hearts of Enlil's enemies.

Three hymns dedicated to Ninisina on behalf of specific monarchs are known, Ishbi-Erra D, Iddin-Dagan D and Lipit-Ishtar E; their titles used in scholarship follow the ETCSL naming system. The second of them portrays the goddess as fearsome and states that the tools she uses, a scalpel and a lancet, are "sharp as the claws of a lion to enter the flesh.: The last of the three aforementioned compositions is a šir-namgala (a type of song associated with the gala clergy) and relays how Ninisina and Enlil blessed this king. A letter written by the king of Larsa, Sin-Iddinam, to Ninisina has been identified. Another prayer in the form of the letter is attributed to a scribe named Nannamansum. Ninisina is also well attested in the so-called šuillakku, a type of prayers focused on an individual entreaty which could be incorporated into various rituals.

=== Laments ===
Next to laments focused on Inanna, these dedicated to Ninisina (or Gula) are the most common among known examples of such texts from ancient Mesopotamia. Similar formulas could be used in both cases. Most commonly, Ninisina mourns the loss of her city, Isin, in such texts. For example, in the Lament for Sumer and Ur, she is one of the mourning deities because "Isin was split by onrushing water;" the section dedicated to her is placed after that focused on Lugal-Marada and his wife Imzuanna, and before the one which describes the fate of Ninlil. The loss of Damu is another frequent topic of the laments, sometimes combined with the destruction of Isin. Dina Katz, following earlier studies, notes that in contrast with other dying gods, Damu was seemingly imagined not as a young man, but as a baby, with one text apparently describing him as a "newborn child who was not yet washed," which might indicate traditions pertaining to him were inspired by high infant mortality rates in ancient Mesopotamia. Ninisina typically addresses him either as "my son" (dumu-ĝu_{10}) or "my Damu" (da-mu-ĝu_{10}). Possible references to Ninisina going down to the underworld to recover Damu are known, though the source might be an adaptation of a text originally focused on Inanna.

=== Other texts ===
In the myth Enki and the World Order, Ninisina is one of the goddesses appointed to her position by the eponymous god who are mentioned in Inanna's complaint about own position, alongside Aruru, Ninmug, Nisaba and Nanshe. She is described as a nu-ge_{17}, a term now agreed to refer to a midwife. She is also mentioned in the Song of the Hoe, where she brings offerings for Enlil, including young lambs and fruit. According to Wilfred G. Lambert, a further presently unknown myth involving Ninisina might have been the origin of her epithet Kurribba, "she who was angry on the mountain" or "she who was angry at the mountain." A late hymn listing her various bynames states that as Kurriba she "expels furious attacks."

Ninisina is attested in a number of god lists, starting with the Early Dynastic Fara god list. In the Weidner god list, she precedes Ninkarrak and Pabilsag. In the Old Babylonian Nippur god list, she appears as the forty second of the deities mentioned, between Bau and Gula. A fragmentary text from Ur, which might be an otherwise unknown god list from the same period, places her on the fourth place in a short enumeration of deities, after Anu, Enlil and Nintu and before Nanna, Enki, Utu, Inanna and Ishkur. In the Old Babylonian forerunner to the later god list An = Anum, she appears after the spouses of various healing goddesses, and before Ninkarrak, but in the later version Ninkarrak comes first.

From the Ur III to the Old Babylonian period, Ninisina was frequently invoked in incantations. She was typically implored to vanquish demons in them.
