= Pabilsaĝ =

Mesopotamian god

- Warrior god, divine cadastral official
- Other names: Lugal-Isin, Erimabinutuku
- Major cult center: Larak, Isin
- Weapon: bow
- Symbol: the constellation Sagittarius

Genealogy
- Parents: Enlil and Nintur (Note: In this context to be identified with Ninlil)
- Spouse: Ninisina
- Children: Damu, Gunura, Šumaḫ

Pabilsaĝ (Sumerian: 𒀭𒉺𒉈𒊕 /pabilsaŋ/; also romanized as Pabilsag) was a Mesopotamian god. Not much is known about his role in Mesopotamian religion, though it is known that he could be regarded as a bow-armed warrior deity, as a divine cadastral officer or a judge. He might have also been linked to healing, though this remains disputed. In his astral aspect, first attested in the Old Babylonian period, he was a divine representation of the constellation Sagittarius.

A spousal relationship between Pabilsaĝ and the medicine goddess Ninisina is well attested. It is presumed he was implicitly regarded as the father of her children, Damu, Gunura, Šumaḫ. Sometimes he is instead attested alongside other medicine goddesses, such as Gula or Ninkarrak, though not necessarily in the role of a spouse. He was also closely associated with Ninurta, and possibly through syncretism with him came to be viewed as a son of Enlil.

Larak, a lost city possibly located near Isin, was the main cult center of Pabilsaĝ. He was also worshiped in Isin, Nippur and Lagash. Additional attestations come from Ur, Umma, Sippar, Babylon, Assur and Kurba'il. However, he was overall a minor deity, and was not venerated all across Mesopotamia.

== Name ==
A number of different cuneiform writings of Pabilsaĝ's name are known. Two are already attested in the Early Dynastic period, ^{d}GIŠ.BIL.PAP-sag and ^{d}BIL.PAP-sag. Its etymology remains unclear, and past proposals, such as "arrow shooter" (from Sumerian sìg-gi_{9}-sag), "the elder (is) the leader" (per analogy between /pabil/ and pa-bíl-ga, "paternal uncle" or "paternal grandfather") and "presbiter", found no widespread acceptance and generally are regarded as implausible.

Due to Pabilsaĝ's role as the spouse of Ninisina it is presumed that he might have been designated by the similar masculine theonym Lugal-Isin.

According to Wilfred G. Lambert, it is possible that in the Old Babylonian period Pabilsaĝ could be also referred to as Erimabinutuku. A god bearing this name is appointed as the deity of Isin in a passage from the myth Enmešarra's Defeat dealing with the assignment of cities to individual members of the Mesopotamian pantheon. This text is known from only one copy, which dates to the Seleucid of Parthian period, but it cannot be ascertained yet when it was originally composed. Erimabinutuku is otherwise unknown, with the exception of texts which appear to present this theonym as the name of a divine weapon belonging to Ninurta, and Lambert states that while it is plausible that it originally was the weapon of Pabilsaĝ instead, it is difficult to explain how its name instead came to designate its owner.

A shortened writing of Pabilsaĝ's name, ^{d}PA, is attested in god lists. With a different determinative, ^{mul}PA, it could be used to refer to his astral aspect.

== Character and iconography ==
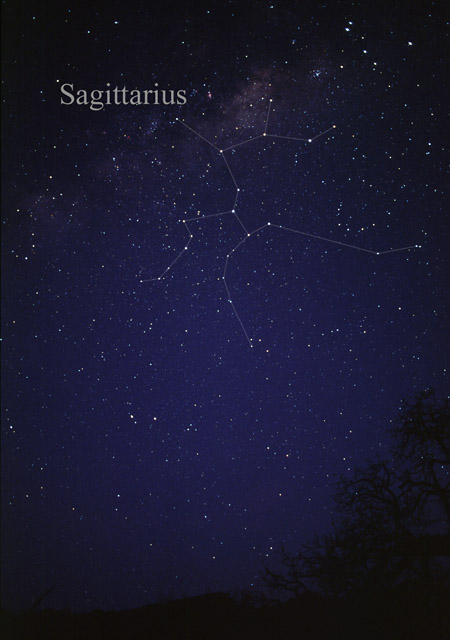
The constellation Sagittarius, identified with Pabilsaĝ in Mesopotamian astronomy.

Pabilsaĝ's original character is difficult to ascertain, as it is uncertain which of his attested aspects constitute his original nature, which were acquired due to syncretism with Ninurta, and which are related to his marriage to Ninisina. As already attested in the Early Dynastic period, he could be perceived as a warrior god. His weapon was a bow.

Manfred Krebernik argues that much like his wife, Pabilsaĝ was in part a deity associated with medicine. However, Irene Sibbing-Plantholt argues that he did not possess healing qualities himself, with the only possible exception being an unusual Old Babylonian text, PBS 10/213, whose translation is uncertain and which might equate him with Damu rather than ascribe such character directly to him.

It is additionally assumed that Pabilsaĝ was a judge deity, as in association with the Erabriri temple he was referred to as "lord high judge", and it is possible he was sometimes associated with the prison goddess Manungal in his judiciary role. Cadastral functions are attested both for him and his wife Ninisina, referred to as "cadastral director of An" on occasion.

Same sources appear to point at an association between Pabilsaĝ and the underworld as well. In the incantation series Udug Hul he is addressed as its "administrator", and he is accompanied by deities well known for their connection to the world of the dead, such as Ningishzida, Hušbišag and Bidu. It has been proposed that this aspect of his character reflected a connection to either Manungal or Meslamtaea (Nergal).

As first documented in Old Babylonian texts from Kish and Nippur, Pabilsaĝ also had an astral aspect. He represented a constellation corresponding to modern Sagittarius in Mesopotamian astronomy. It has been pointed out that constellations representing closely related Gula (She-goat, modern Lyra) and Damu (Pig, variously interpreted as modern Delphinus, Vulpecula or part of Draco), are often listed alongside it.

In art Pabilsaĝ was depicted as a zazzaku, a type of official, identified by Manfred Krebernik as a cadastral officer, but it is also possible that based on the similarity of a figure sometimes depicted on kudurru (inscribed boundary stones) with the representation of Sagittarius in the Dendera Zodiac, it can be assumed that in later times in his astral aspect he could be represented as a centaur-like archer with a horse's body and a scorpion's tail.

== Associations with other deities ==
=== Parentage ===
Pabilsaĝ 's parents were Enlil, the head of the pantheon, and Nintur, in this context to be identified as the wife of the former, Ninlil. An Early Dynastic riddle from Lagash calls him the "hero of Enlil" (ur-sag ^{d}en-líl-lá). However, this epithet does not necessarily designate him as his son, and the evidence for a parental relation first appears in sources from the Old Babylonian period.

A zi-hé-pà formula from the Old Babylonian period calls Pabilsaĝ a son of Anu instead. However, this attestation is isolated and it is not certain if it reflects a fully separate distinct tradition.

=== Pabilsaĝ and Ninisina ===
A connection between Pabilsaĝ and the circle of Mesopotamian healing deities is well attested. He was regarded as the husband of Ninisina. They are one of the multiple examples of Mesopotamian divine couples consisting of a medicine goddess and a warrior god. As noted by John Z. Wee, he "often seems overshadowed by his spouse" in Mesopotamian texts. Cities in which they were worshiped as a couple include Isin, Larak and Lagash. They are attested together in offering lists, literary compositions and other sources from the Ur III period onward. They came to be regarded as spouses no later than at this time, though it has been noted Pabilsaĝ is already attested in Ninisina's cult center, Isin, in the Early Dynastic and Old Akkadian periods. As attested in records from the ninth year of Amar-Sin's reign, a festival connected to Pabilsaĝ and his cult center Larak involved the travel of Ninisina to this city by boat. There is also evidence that Ninisina could be called the "Lady of Erabriri", Erabriri being the ceremonial name of a temple dedicated to Pabilsaĝ.

It is possible that originally in Larak Pabilsaĝ's spouse was instead Gašan-ašte. This goddess, whose name can be translated as "throne lady", occurs only in Emesal laments, and the hypothetical standard Sumerian ("Emegir") form Nin-ašte is not attested. She presumably at some point came to be equated with Ninisina. Irene Sibbing-Plantholt proposes that this process reflected an attempt at providing Ninisina with a husband representing a city which traditionally held ideological significance, and that she might have completely absorbed Pabilsaĝ's previous spouse after Larak lost political relevance.

Despite the connection between Pabilsaĝ and Ninisina, no known texts directly address him as the father of her children, Damu and Gunura. It is nonetheless presumed that he was implicitly understood as the father of both of them as well as of another minor god similarly associated with Ninisina, Šumaḫ. A document from Puzrish-Dagan from Ibbi-Sin’s reign attests that offerings were provided in Isin for Pabilsaĝ and his family: Ninisina, Gunura, Damu and Šumaḫ.

=== Pabilsaĝ and other healing goddesses ===
Pabilsaĝ could alternatively be regarded as the husband of other healing goddesses. A small number of sources from Old Babylonian Mari connect Ninkarrak, usually paired with Išḫara instead in local tradition, with him, which might depend on a preexisting connection between Ninisina and this goddess. Two contemporary seals, one from Tell Harmal and one of unknown provenance, pair them together as well. Ninkarrak is also addressed as his wife in Bulluṭsa-rabi's hymn to Gula.

While an apparent association between Pabilsaĝ and Gula is present in offering lists from Old Babylonian Nippur, according to Irene Sibbing-Plantholt they were not regarded as spouses in this context, though she does accept the possibility that their juxtaposition did reflect the close association between Gula and Ninisina. It is possible that in the local tradition of Nippur Pabilsaĝ s spouse was the sparsely attested deity Enanun, who came to be represented as a healing goddess in sources from the first millennium BCE. However, Gula is identified as his spouse in the god list An = Anum (tablet V, line 125). They were also associated with each other in Assyrian sources from Assur and Kurba'il (for example the so-called tākultu ritual) and in Babylon.

Pabilsaĝ is paired with Nintinugga in an Old Babylonian incantation in which multiple divine couples are asked to judge the patient, with the other deities mentioned including Tishpak and Ukulla, Zababa and Bau, Ninurta and Ninnibru and Ningishzida and Azimua. Elsewhere her spouse was Endaga. Manfred Krebernik argues that this god might have been viewed as a hypostasis of Pabilsaĝ.

=== Pabilsaĝ and Ninurta ===
Pabilsaĝ was partially syncretised with Ninurta, as attested in lexical lists such as the Nippur god list and the late Sultantepe god list. This process most likely began in the Old Babylonian period. An early instance of the identification between them is attested in a širnamšub composition dedicated to Ninurta originally composed during the reign of the First Dynasty of Isin. In some cases, Pabilsaĝ was by extension also identified with Ningirsu. (Note: Ningirsu and Ninurta were distinct deities before the Old Akkadian period, but became virtually interchangeable later on, as attested for example by the alternation between the two names in different versions of Lugal-e or the epic of Anzû.) The syncretism between these three gods was enabled by their shared warlike character. Joan Goodnick Westenholz pointed out that interchange of traits between certain deities was also likely facilitated by the existence of multiple couples consisting of a warrior god and a healing goddess, citing Pabilsaĝ and Ninisina, Ningirsu and Bau and Ninurta and Ninnibru as examples. Manuel Ceccarelli argues that the syncretism had a political dimension, as by identifying Pabilsaĝ with Ninurta the rulers of Isin could elevate the position of Ninisina and directly connect her to the family of the head of the pantheon, Enlil, by making her his daughter-in-law due to Pabilsaĝ becoming his son like Ninurta. He points out inserting various deities into the family tree for political reasons would have a plausible precedent in the development of the traditions presenting Ningirsu and Nanna as Enlil's sons respectively during the reign of Gudea and the Third Dynasty of Ur.

In the epic of Anzû, Pabilsag is said to be the name of Ninurta applied to him in the Egalmaḫ, according to Andrew R. George to be understood as the temple of Ninisina in Isin rather than any of the other houses of worship bearing the same ceremonial name. This passage assigns a total of eighteen names to Ninurta in order to syncretize him with other originally separate figures. Pabilsaĝ is also mentioned in Bulluṭsa-rabi's hymn to Gula, in which the spouse of this goddess is similarly identified with a number of other gods.

In the later text KAR 142, Pabilsaĝ is listed as a member of a group addressed as the "seven Ninurtas". Its other six members are given as Ninurta himself, Urash, Zababa, Nabu, Nergal and ^{d}DI.KUD.

== Worship ==
Pabilsaĝ already appears in Early Dynastic god lists from Fara and Abu Salabikh. However, he was a minor god, and in contrast with deities such as Enlil or Ninurta he was not worshiped all across Mesopotamia. It is presumed that he originated in the city of Larak, whose tutelary deity he was. This settlement only rarely appears in textual sources, and its location remains unknown. It is possible that it was located close to Isin; identification with Tell al-Wilayah has been proposed too but was not conclusively proved. From Ur III to Middle Babylonian times Larak appears exclusively in lexical lists, literary texts and theophoric names, and while a city bearing the same name does appear in Neo-Assyrian historical records it is not certain if it can be identified with the earlier cult center of Pabilsaĝ.

In Isin, his other cult center, Pabilsaĝ was worshiped as early as in the Old Akkadian period. His temple in this city was likely known under the ceremonial Sumerian name Erabriri, (Note: Not to be confused with identically named temples of Ennugi in Nippur and Mandanu in Babylon.) "house of the shackle which holds in check". He was also venerated in the temple of his wife Ninisina, Egalmaḫ, "exalted palace". Both of these houses of worship commonly appear side by side in laments. One of the city gates of Isin was also named after him.

It has been argued that the worship of Pabilsaĝ was important in the state of Lagash as well. However, in the Early Dynastic period he is only attested there in an early literary text, a compilation of riddles, and in the theophoric name Ur-Pabilsaĝ. Douglas Frayne notes that based on the former it is possible to speculate that he was the main deity of a hitherto unidentified settlement in Lagashite territory. In the Ur III period he was worshiped in this area in the city of Urub, and in offering lists often appears alongside his wife Ninisina.

A further city in which Pabilsaĝ was worshiped was Nippur. He is already mentioned in sources from the Old Akkadian and Ur III periods, in the latter case appearing alongside Ninisina in offering lists. In similar Old Babylonian texts, he was grouped with Dumuzi and Gula. Gudu_{4} priests in his service are mentioned in texts from this period as well.

Evidence for the worship of Pabilsaĝ in Ur also exists. The seal of an ereš-dingir priestess of Pabilsaĝ, a certain Gan-kuĝ-sig, has been discovered in the Early Dynastic royal tombs of Ur, and it is possible that she belonged to the city's royal family. Additionally, a fragment of a bowl inscribed with the name of the king Ur-Pabilsaĝ has been found in the same city. Douglas Frayne suggests that he might have been Gan-kuĝ-sig's son, relying on the possible identification of two tombs (PG 779 and PG 777) located close to the findspot of her seal (PG 580) as belonging to, respectively, Ur-Pabilsaĝ and his wife, but admits the proposal is ultimately conjectural. It is not certain if Ur-Pabilsaĝ was a native ruler of Ur in the first place, and his reign cannot be dated conclusively. A different individual bearing the name Ur-Pabilsaĝ is attested from a text from Ur from the Ur III period as well.

An Early Dynastic inscription of E-abzu, a ruler of Umma, might mention Pabilsaĝ, but the restoration of the theonym is uncertain. Texts from the same city from the reigns of Shulgi and Amar-Sin mention grain offerings made to him there by his gudu_{4} priests. The theophoric name Ur-Pabilsaĝ is attested in Umma too.

A text from Mari identified as a draft of an inscription for a stele commemorating a victory of Zimri-Lim mentions Pabilsaĝ. A single Old Babylonian seal inscription from Sippar mentions Pabilsaĝ alongside Gula.

In Babylon, a shrine dedicated to Pabilsaĝ existed in the temple of Mandanu.

In Assyria Pabilsaĝ was worshiped in Assur and Kurba'il. As an astral figure, he is well attested in Neo-Assyrian omen compendiums.

== Mythology ==
In the composition Ninisina and the gods (Nin-Isina F in the ETCSL naming system), Pabilsaĝ is addressed as the "beloved spouse" of the eponymous goddess, who "spent time joyously with him".

In a fragmentary Sumerian flood myth dated to the late Old Babylonian period at the earliest and presumed to reflect the tradition also documented in Atrahasis and in the flood myth which formed a part of the Epic of Gilgamesh, the assignment of Larak to Pabilsaĝ is mentioned in an early section of the narrative which describes the assignment of five cities, the other four being Eridu, Sippar, Bad-tibira and Shuruppak, to their corresponding tutelary deities. The god responsible for this is stated to be Enlil.
