= Bulluṭsa-rabi =

Ancient Mesopotamian author and āšipu

- Occupation: āšipu
- Language: Akkadian
- Period: Kassite period
- Notable works: Hymn to Gula

Bulluṭsa-rabi (also romanized as Bullussa-rabi) was a Babylonian author and āšipu who most likely lived in the Kassite period. While sources from the first millennium BCE indicate at the time it was assumed that Bulluṭsa-rabi was a man, and this assumption was also initially followed by Assyriologists, further research showed that all individuals bearing this name recorded in earlier sources were women. A composition known from Nineveh, the Catalogue of Texts and Authors, attributes the authorship of a well known hymn to Gula and a number of unidentified texts to her.

== Identity ==
Bulluṭsa-rabi's name can be translated from Akkadian as "her curing is great". It implicitly refers to Gula, a Mesopotamian goddess associated with healing. The so-called Catalogue of Texts and Authors states that she was an āšipu. This term is often translated as "incantation priest" or "exorcist". Furthermore, it describes her as a "scholar of Babylon".

Sources from the first millennium BCE consistently preface Bulluṭsa-rabi's name with a masculine determinative. When it was first identified in a cuneiform text in 1967, Wilfred G. Lambert also concluded that it belonged to a man. The same assumption was followed by Benjamin R. Foster in his 2005 translation of the same text. However, as summarized by Zsombor Földi, while initially the name was otherwise unknown, further research revealed the existence of multiple women bearing it who lived in Nippur between the reigns of the Kassite kings Nazi-Maruttash (1307-1282 BCE) and Shagarakti-Shuriash (1245-1233 BCE). He concludes that their namesake might have similarly been a woman, and presumably also was active in the thirteenth century BCE. Enrique Jiménez, who took part in the research leading to this discovery alongside Földi, Tonio Mitto and Adrian Heinrich, states that most likely in later periods copyists presumed all authors were men, regardless of their original identity. He compares the evolution of opinions regarding Bulluṭsa-rabi in Assyriology to the earlier research focused on another ancient Mesopotamian author, Enheduanna. Following their publications, the case of Bulluṭsa-rabi received press coverage in October 2020 in Süddeutsche Zeitung and Die Welt. In the former of these newspapers, Harald Eggebrecht noted that it might lead to further inquiries into the gender of Mesopotamian authors previously also by default presumed to be men.

== Works ==
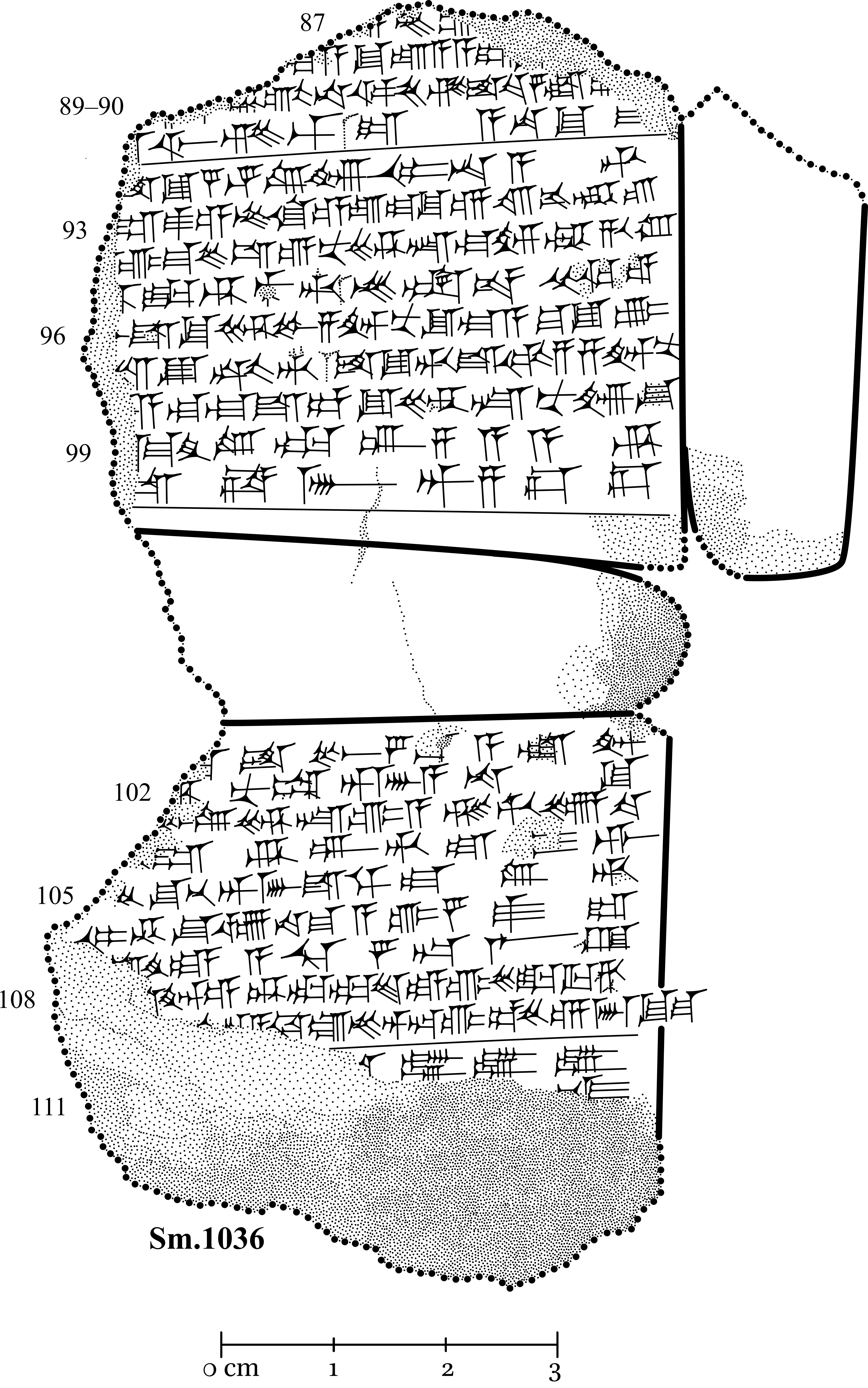
One of the manuscripts of the hymn to Gula, copied by Zsombor Földi.

It is presumed that Bulluṭsa-rabi was the author of a well known hymn to Gula. As of 2022, over 20 fragments have been identified, with the oldest dating to the Neo-Assyrian period and the youngest to Seleucid or Parthian times. The name is mentioned in the final lines of this composition, though they are not an attribution of authorship:

Gula, great lady whose support is Ninurta,
Plead his cause with your might[y], resplendent spouse,
That he may bring forth life with reference to Bullussa-rabi,
That the latter may bow down before you daily.

Direct evidence confirming Bulluṭsa-rabi was regarded as the author is known from Catalogue of Texts and Authors, a scholarly text discovered in Nineveh.

The hymn is written in first person as a speech delivered by the goddess Gula. Joan Goodnick Westenholz classified it as an example of aretalogy. It is 200 lines long and consists of 20 sections, each focused on a different name attributed to Gula or her spouse by the author. However, the latter deity, Ninurta, receives less names than Gula and his character is not elaborated upon to an equal degree, which indicates he was not the focus of the composition. Among the goddesses identified with Gula are Nintinugga, Ninmadiriga, Nanshe, Ninkarrak, Ninigizibara, Bau, Ungal-Nibru, Ninsun and Ninlil, who were all originally fully separate deities, which is reflected by the assignment of separate roles to them in the hymn. Joan Goodnick Westenholz states that the presence of Nanshe and Ninsun is unexpected, while the inclusion of Ninlil might have been derived from an apparent case of syncretism between Gula and Sud attested in an Old Babylonian manuscript of the Weidner god list. Irene Sibbing-Plantholt highlights the absence of any references to Ninisina, who was elsewhere closely associated with Gula. Only three sections focus on Gula’s role as a healing goddess, namely these focused on her under her primary name, as well as these dedicated to Ninlil and Ningizibara. Most sections instead focus on her exalted position in Mesopotamian religion. A number of similar hymns in which a deity is identified with others sharing similar character, and it is presumed that they might have developed from a similar practice well attested in god lists. Other examples include compositions focused on deities such as Marduk, Ninurta or Nanaya. They are presumed to reflect the theological speculation common especially in the first millennium BCE, and the processes of restructuring of the Mesopotamian pantheon, which often involved glorification and elevation of certain deities through presenting similar figures as identical with them. However, these phenomena did not necessarily impact the cult of individual deities.

The Catalogue of Texts and Authors attributes three further compositions to Bulluṭsa-rabi in addition to the hymn to Gula, but they remain unidentified. Zsombor Földi suggests that one of them might have been preserved on the lost obverse of one of the copies of the hymn to Gula, which was apparently inscribed with a different composition. A similar possibility has already been suggested by Wilfred G. Lambert in 1967, though at the time it was presumed only one more composition was attributed to this author. Enrique Jiménez notes it is not impossible other hymns written by Bulluṭsa-rabi are already known to researchers, but cannot yet be attributed to her due to imperfect preservation.
