= Gunura =

Mesopotamian goddess

- Major cult center: Isin

Genealogy
- Parents: Ninisina and Pabilsag
- Siblings: Damu and Šumaḫ

Gunura was a Mesopotamian goddess, best known as a daughter and member of the entourage of the medicine goddess Ninisina. She was also associated with other similar goddesses, Gula and Nintinugga. Her original cult center is unknown, though she was worshiped in Isin, Nippur, Ur, Babylon and Assur. She is attested in a number of laments, in which she mourns the death of her brother Damu, and in a narrative about a journey of her mother Ninisina to Nippur.

== Character ==
The etymology of Gunura's name is unknown, and early attempts at explaining it relied on the incorrect reading ^{d}Gu-šir_{5}-ra rather than ^{d}Gu-nu-ra. She was considered to be a daughter of the medicine goddess Ninisina and her husband Pabilsag, and sister of Damu and Šumaḫ. Alternatively, she could be associated with other similar goddesses, such as Gula or Nintinugga. Three texts from Nippur from the Ur III period attest an association between her and latter deity. She also appears alongside her in an Old Babylonian incantation against the evil eye. Furthermore, a liturgical text from the same period lists her after both Ninisina and Nintinugga, and before Kusu. In the so-called Great Star List, she is one of the "seven Gulas", next to Bau, Ninšudda, Dukurgal, Ama-arḫuš, Ninasag and Nin-umma-siga. However, as pointed out by Joan Goodnick Westenholz, Gunura does not appear in connection with another closely related goddess, Ninkarrak, in any known sources, with the exception of a single bilingual text. It is a variant of Ninisina's Journey to Nippur in which Ninkarrak appears in the Akkadian version as a translation of the eponymous goddess.

In the past, it has been argued that Gunura's individual character cannot be established, as in known texts she always appears alongside other members of her family. According to Irene Sibbing-Plantholt today it is assumed that she was a deity associated with healing. She suggests Gunura might have originally arisen as an independent healing deity, and was only incorporated into the circles of medicine goddesses for that reason. When associated with Ninisina, Gunura also functioned as one of the deities of Isin, though this role is not attested for her in contexts where she appears with Gula instead. An example can be found in the document SAT 3 127, which lists her, Damu, Šumaḫ and their mother Ninisina as the deities of Isin.

The epithet dumu-é-a, translated as "child of the house" or "daughter of the house", could be applied to Gunura. It is also attested as a title of the weather goddess Shala and the love goddess Nanaya. According to Dietz Otto Edzard, it might reflect the fact that she was worshiped in the temple of her mother Ninisina, and did not have one of her own. However, according to Andrew R. George a temple of Gunura might have been mentioned in a lost section of the Canonical Temple List, a lexical list compiling the ceremonial names of sanctuaries located in Babylonia, presumed to come from the second half of the Kassite period.

== Worship ==
The earliest attestations of Gunura come from the Ur III period. She is best known from the pantheon of Isin, though she did not necessarily originate in this city, and it is presently impossible to establish what was her original cult center. Dina Katz proposes that she was originally worshiped in the same unidentified location as Damu, and that at some point their cult center was destroyed, leading to the transfer of their cult to Isin and incorporation into the circle of Ninisina. She was worshiped in the temple of this goddess located there, and appears in an early Old Babylonian offering list from the same location alongside this goddess, Damu, Ninšarnuna, Ninigizibara, Utu and Urmašum. Documents from the archives of the Third Dynasty of Ur indicate that sometimes offerings to her were made by practitioners of medicine (asû), with historically notable members of this profession who performed them including Šu-kabta, Nawir-ilum and Ubartum. She also worshiped in Ur in a temple of Gula. She is attested in two offering lists from this city.

According to a Neo-Assyrian tākultu text Gunura was also worshiped in Assur in association with Gula. A seat of Gunura, the Eankuga, "house of pure heaven," existed in one of the temples bearing the name Erabriri, according to Andrew R. George located in Babylon. It belonged to the god Mandanu, and additionally housed similar shrines of Gula, Pabilsag, Urmašum and Damu. A text from the reign of Nebuchadnezzar II mentions a statue of Gunura located in the Esabad, a temple of Gula located in the same city. Gunura is also mentioned alongside Ninisina, Nintinugga, Damu and Bau in the text AO 17622, which might be an Achaemenid period copy of a Neo-Babylonian original.

Examples of theophoric names invoking Gunura are known, one example being Ur-Gunura, "man of Gunura."

== Literature ==
Gunura is attested in a number of literary compositions, in which she usually appears alongside members of her family. For example, in the composition Edina-Usagake ("In the Desert by the Early Grass") she is mentioned in a list of mourning deities alongside Ningishzida's sister Amašilama and his wife Ninazimua. Dina Katz suggests that due to the presence of members of families of multiple dying gods this text, known from Old Babylonian copies though possibly related to rituals performed in the Ur III period already, might have been based on a number of originally separate laments. She also appears in a similar role in another lament, MAH 16016.

In Ninisina's Journey to Nippur Gunura appears alongside her brother Damu, and both of them either collectively act as a "good protective spirit", Alad-šaga, or are accompanied by a being bearing this name.
