= Ninḫinuna =

Mesopotamian goddess

- Deified string instrument, servant of Ninisina or Inanna
- Major cult center: Isin, Uruk

Ninḫinuna or Ninḫenunna was a Mesopotamian goddess. She could be regarded as a servant deity or a deified instrument, specifically a harp or a lyre. She was associated with Inanna and Ninisina, as indicated by god lists and literary texts. She was worshiped in Old Babylonian Isin, as well as in Seleucid Uruk. However, in the latter city her introduction into the local pantheon might have been a late phenomenon reflecting the study of god lists, and she is absent from sources from the Neo-Babylonian period from the same location.

== Name and character ==
The standard writing of Ninḫinuna's name in cuneiform was ^{d}nin-ḫi-nun-na. This form is attested for example in the Isin god list. A variant, ^{d}nin-ḫé-nun-na, occurs in a ritual text from Uruk. Julia Krul romanizes this form as Ninḫenunna. The name can be translated from Sumerian as "lady abundance" or "lady of abundance". According to Manuel Ceccarelli, the similarity to the term ḫenun, "perfume", is accidental.

Ninḫinuna could be interpreted both as a personified deity and as a deified object, as indicated by texts from Isin referring to repairs of an instrument designated by her name. She could be referred to as a gu_{4}-balaĝ. This term refers to a type of string instrument, presumed to be a lyre or harp. However, it was also a designation of a class of minor deities who were believed to act as advisors of other members of the pantheon. In the god list An = Anum they are the most widespread type of servant deities. The term referring to them might be a unique logographic writing of ad-gi_{4}-gi_{4}, "adviser", glossed in Akkadian as mumtalku, "counselor" or "confidant".

== Associations with other deities ==
As a servant deity, Ninḫinuna could be associated with Inanna or Ninisina. She already appears in association with Inanna in the Old Babylonian forerunner of the god list An = Anum, with An = Anum itself assigning her the role of one of the eighteen messengers of this goddess (tablet IV, line 160). In another fragmentary Old Babylonian god list which might be a further forerunner of An = Anum, she might occur directly before Inanna, though according to Manuel Ceccarelli such a placement would be unusual for a servant deity. However, the name is not fully preserved. She also appears in the same list in a section dedicated to Ninisina, in the proximity of Gunura, Šumaḫ, Urmašum and Nintinugga. According to Grégoire Nicolet, her placement in the Isin god list also reflects an association both with Inanna and Ninisina, similarly as the position of Ninshubur and Ninigizibara in this source. The association with Ninisina is also reflected in the composition Ninisina's Journey to Nippur. This text is already attested in the Old Babylonian period. She is described in it as ellu, "shining", which according to Wolfgang Heimpel in this context might reflect the existence of a silver-plated representation of her in Isin.

In An = Anum Ninḫinuna is also listed as one of the gu_{4}-balaĝ of Gula, alongside Ningal (tablet V, line 187–188). (Note: The servant deity Ningal despite homonomy is assumed to be distinct from the better attested Ningal, the wife of Sin.) Klaus Wagensonner argues this attestation correlates with Ninisina's Journey to Nippur. (Note: Gula was closely associated with Ninisina and had a similar character to her. They are sometimes treated as interchangeable by modern authors, though this view has been criticized as a simplification.) Ninḫinuna and Ningal might also be mentioned together in the Mari god list, though restoring the other theonym as Ninagal has been suggested as well.

== Worship ==
Ninḫinuna was worshiped in Isin in the Old Babylonian period. Two economic texts from the reign of Ishbi-Erra mention the preparation of cured bull hide and gold decorations for her. It is presumed that they refer to repairs of an instrument representing her.

Ritual texts indicate that Ninḫinuna was worshiped in Uruk in the Seleucid period, though she is absent from the earlier, Neo-Babylonian text corpus from the same city. She is mentioned in the text TU 42+, an instruction for the akītu festival of Ishtar, alongside deities such as the deified sage Adapa, Urkayītu, Kilili, Barirītu, Bēlet-Eanna of Udannu, Kanisurra, Nanaya, and others. Julia Krul notes she seems to belong to a subgroup of Ishtar's servants reflecting the god list An = Anum. She suggests that such deities constituted a new addition to the local pantheon, and that their inclusion in rituals was the result of study of god lists and other similar sources. Despite her ritual role, Ninḫinuna is absent from legal texts from Seleucid Uruk and was not invoked in theophoric names.
