= Nintinugga =

Mesopotamian medicine goddess from Nippur

- Goddess of medicine
- Major cult center: Nippur
- Animals: dog

Genealogy
- Parents: Ninazu (father)
- Spouse: Endaga

Equivalents
- Isin: Ninisina
- Umma: Gula
- Sippar: Ninkarrak

Nintinugga (𒀭𒊩𒌆𒁷𒂦𒂵; also romanized as Nintinuga) was a Mesopotamian goddess associated with medicine and cleansing. She belonged to the local pantheon of Nippur. While she has been compared to other similar goddesses, such as Ninisina and Gula, and in a number of ancient texts they appear to be syncretised with each other or are treated as interchangeable, she was nonetheless a distinct deity in her own right. She was associated with Enlil and Ninlil, and was worshiped in their temples, though houses of worship dedicated only to her are also attested.

== Character ==
Nintinugga's name is conventionally translated from Sumerian as "Mistress who revives the dead". However, Barbara Böck notes this interpretation might only reflect an "ancient scholarly etymology." It is possible it initially had a different meaning, with one proposal being "lady of the lofty wine," and only from the reign of Uruinimgina onward it started to be written with the cuneiform sign ug_{5}, "to die." An epithet sometimes applied to her was "the lady of life and death," nin til_{3}-la ug_{5}-ga, attested both in royal inscriptions and in various god lists.

Descriptions of Nintinugga's activity in Mesopotamian texts present her as physician, with her responsibilities including applying bandages, cleaning wounds and, according to Böck, specifically dealing with the musculoskeletal system. The evidence for an association between her and healing first appears in sources from the Ur III period, and she is well attested as a medicine goddess in the Old Babylonian period. Attestations of physicians serving as her cultic officials are considered to be early evidence of her healing role. In texts where she and other healing deities are invoked together she might represent a specific form of healing rather than medicine as a whole. She was additionally associated with incantations. In a type of ritual, atua, she is connected with cleansing rather than healing, and Irene Sibbing-Plantholt proposes this might have been an aspect of her original character. However, she also considers it a possibility that she developed as an extension of a healing aspect of Enlil.

Possibly due to the meaning of her name, Nintinugga was connected to the underworld. Jeremiah Peterson notes it is likely that it was believed that she provided the dead with clean water, and that she was connected to funerary libations. She was also invoked against the demon Asag, as relayed in the texts Letter-Prayer of Inanaka and A Dog for Nintinugga.

Dogs are well attested as an attribute of most, though not all, Mesopotamian healing goddesses. The connection might have been based on the observation of healing properties of dog saliva, or on the perception of the animals as liminal and capable of interacting both with the realms of the living and the dead, similar as the goddesses associated with them. Nintinugga was believed to possess dogs of her own, and a text from the Ur III period relays that a throne decorated with two of these animals was prepared for her in Ur. A Mîs-pî ritual from Nineveh mentions reeds and cornel wood among cult objects associated with her.

== Associations with other deities ==
According to a late medical incantation, Nintinugga's father was Ninazu. Despite the association between her and Ninisina, she was never referred to as a daughter of Anu. Barbara Böck argues that Nintinugga and Ninurta were regarded as a couple, but Irene Sibbing-Plantholt in a more recent publication concludes that this view, also present elsewhere in Assyriological literature, is not supported by textual evidence, which is limited to Nintinugga receiving offerings in Ninurta's temple, Ešumeša, which is attested for most members of the local pantheon and does not indicate a spousal relationship. According to the god list An = Anum, her husband was Endaga (^{d}en-dag-ga), a god of unknown character already attested in the Fara and Abu Salabikh god lists from the Early Dynastic period, but there is no indication in any known sources that the relationship between them was considered significant. In a single lament, Nintinugga appears in the role of the mother of Damu. According to Böck the tradition according to which he was her son is known from Ur. Sibbing-Plantholt points out that both Damu and Gunura appear in association with her in three texts from Nippur dated to the Ur III period.

Nintinugga was also associated with Enlil and could be designated as his šimmu, translated as "incantation priestess" or "sorcerer" by Joan Goodnick Westenholz, but as "a type of healer and provider of medical plants" by Sibbing-Plantholt. The latter author argues that the common assumption that this term designated a specialist similar to the ašipu is based only on sources from the first millennium BCE, and earlier texts instead indicate a role similar to that of a herbalist. Another deity connected with Nintinugga was Nungal, the goddess of prisons. In a fragmentary literary text both of them appear alongside Ereshkigal, the goddess of the underworld, possibly due to all three of them sharing a connection to the land of the dead.

=== Nintinugga and other healing goddesses ===
Various goddesses associated with healing, namely Nintinugga, Gula, Ninisina, Ninkarrak, Bau and Meme, formed an interconnected network in Mesopotamian religion, either due to analogous functions or shared associations with other deities. The existence of multiple similar goddesses responsible for medicine reflected the well attested phenomenon of local pantheons typical for individual cities or regions. However, while a degree of interchangeability is attested, Nintinugga was usually regarded as distinct from the other similar goddesses. Their individual character was reflected in distinct traditions regarding their parents and spouses, as well as in associations with separate cult centers. For example, while Nintinugga was associated with Nippur, Ninisina was the goddess of Isin, Gula most likely originated in Umma, and Ninkarrak was worshiped in Sippar.

An association between Nintinugga and Ninisina is attested in sources from the Old Babylonian period, and might have been meant to strengthen the ties between their respective cities, Nippur and Isin. However, they were not necessarily interchangeable, and references to the former traveling to visit the latter in Isin are known from literary texts.

In the Gula Hymn of Bulluṭsa-rabi, a syncretistic work composed at some point between 1400 and 700 BCE which equates the eponymous goddess both with other medicine goddesses and with deities of different character, such as Nanshe and Ninigizibara (a minor goddess from the entourage of Inanna, described as a harpist), Nintinugga appears as one of the names assigned to her. Despite the syncretistic approach, each section focuses on the individual traits of each deity, and that dedicated to Nintinugga highlights both her character as a healing goddess and her connection to the underworld. However, sources from Nippur indicate that local theologians equated Gula with Ninisina, not Nintinugga, possibly due to their respective characters being more similar.

== Worship ==
The cult of Nintinugga was centered in Nippur, as already attested in sources from the Early Dynastic period. It was closely connected to those of Enlil and Ninlil. Initially she was likely worshiped in the temple of the former, while in the Ur III period one of the four chapels located in the temple of the latter belonged to her (the other three were dedicated to Nanna, Nisaba and Ninhursag). She also had her own temple in Nippur, possibly named Eurusaga, "the foremost city," though it is left nameless in the Ur III sources. The so-called "lamma (tutelary deity) of the king," ^{d}lamma-lugal, was worshiped inside it as well. A further sanctuary dedicated to her, located within the E.NI.gula (reading of the second sign uncertain) of Enlil, was the Eamirku, "pure house of stormy weather," attested in a copy of a building inscription which might have been based on an original from the reign of Ur-Nammu. It is possible that at one point Nintinugga was the personal goddess of Enlilalša, a governor of Nippur and gudu priest of Ninlil, and she might be depicted on his seal. Another historically notable person known to be a worshiper of this goddess was Ubartum, regarded as the best documented female practitioner of medicine in ancient Mesopotamian sources.

Outside Nippur, worship of Nintinugga is attested in texts from Ur and Isin. A temple dedicated to her rebuilt by Enlil-bani which bore the ceremonial name Enidubbu, "house which gives rest," might have been located in the latter of those two cities.

The cult of Nintinugga lost importance after the Old Babylonian period. The reason might have been the gradual decline of southern Mesopotamian cities. However, it did not fully disappear, as for example in an inscription on a Neo-Babylonian jar stopper she appears alongside Marduk, Ninisina and Meme (here a representation of Gula). In litanies, her name was preserved until the Seleucid period. However, Paul-Alain Beaulieu argues that it was already only understood as an epithet of Gula during the reign of Cyrus I.
