= Ninmeurur =

Mesopotamian goddess

- Adviser of Ishtar
- Major cult center: Uruk

Ninmeurur (𒀭𒎏𒈨𒌴𒌴, ^{d}nin-me-ur_{4}-ur_{4}) was a Mesopotamian goddess regarded as a servant of Ishtar. In the balaĝ composition Uru-Ama'irabi she is specifically described as one of her advisers. Her name might be derived from the designation of a sanctuary of Nanaya located in Uruk, known from inscriptions of Sîn-gāmil and Anam. She was already worshiped in the Old Babylonian period. She also appears in ritual texts from Seleucid Uruk as one of the deities associated with Ishtar invoked during the akītu festival.

== Name and character ==
Ninmeurur's name was written in cuneiform as ^{d}nin-me-ur_{4}-ur_{4}. An emesal variant, ga-ša-an-me-ur_{4}-ur_{4}, is also attested. It can be translated from Sumerian as "lady who collects all the me". Joan Goodnick Westenholz suggested interpreting it as "lady of the Meurur temple". Multiple houses of worship bearing this name dedicated to either Ishtar or Nanaya are known, with one located in Larsa (as attested in a year formula of Gungunum), one in Mari (as attested in an inscription of Shamshi-Adad I), one in Uruk, and one in Babylon. According to Westenholz, the Urukean temple, which was dedicated to Nanaya, would be presumably meant in this case. Andrew R. George assumes it might have been a part of the Eanna complex. Paul-Alain Beaulieu suggests it was a cella, rather than a separate house of worship. It was rebuilt by Sîn-gāmil and later on by Anam.

Ninmeurur was regarded as a servant of Ishtar. She appears among deities associated with her in the Isin god list. She is placed between Ninigizibara, her deified harp, and Ninḫinuna, a messenger deity associated with her. In an Old Babylonian balaĝ composition, Uru-Ama'irabi, she and Ninigizibara are both designated as her advisers (ad-gi_{4}-gi_{4}). She is also described as her balaĝ. This term referred to a type of string instrument, according to Wolfgang Heimpel to be identified as a harp. However, it was also a designation of a type of servant deities believed to counsel major members of the pantheon. Ninmeurur is more precisely designated as a balaĝ banda, "junior balaĝ", presumably to differentiate her role from that assigned to Ninigizibara, who is also described in this composition as a balaĝ.

== Worship ==
Ninmeurur is already attested in sources from the Old Babylonian period. She is mentioned in the balaĝ composition Uru-Ama'irabi, in the Isin god list, and in another text belonging to this genre which according to Manuel Ceccarelli might be one of the forerunners of later An = Anum. Furthermore, she might be attested in An = Anum itself (tablet IV, line 80), though the name is not fully preserved and the restoration is uncertain.

Ritual texts indicate Ninmeurur was worshiped in Uruk in the Seleucid period, though she is absent from earlier Neo-Babylonian sources from this city. She is mentioned in the text KAR 13, an instruction for the akītu festival, as one of the members of the entourage of Ishtar worshiped in the Irigal, a temple dedicated jointly to this goddess and Nanaya most likely originally built in the Achaemenid period. Its name can be literally translated as "great sanctuary", though Julia Krul argues that it might have additionally been supposed to resemble the term Irkalla, a designation of the underworld. Ninmeurur appears in this context alongside deities such as the "daughters of Eanna", Ninsianna, Ninigizibara, Išartu, Šagepada and two otherwise entirely unknown goddesses, Abeturra and Šarrat-parakki. Joan Goodnick Westenholz noted that most of these deities were associated with temples located in Uruk or with Ishtar, and on this basis suggested they constituted a traditional grouping, in contrast with these invoked during a similar festival held in the same period for Antu. Despite Ninmeurur's presence in ritual texts, she is absent from legal documents and was not invoked in theophoric names.
