= Nikarawa =

Luwian goddess

Nikarawa (Nikarawas) or Nikaruha was a Luwian deity known from inscriptions from Carchemish and other nearly locations. It is commonly, though not universally, assumed that she corresponds to the Mesopotamian goddess Ninkarrak.

== Attestations ==
Nikarawa's name is spelled in Luwian hieroglyphs as ^{d}ni-ka+ra/i-wa/i-sa_{2}. She is known from the curse formula "May the dogs of Nikarawas eat away his head" from Carchemish from the ninth or eighth century BCE, more precisely dated to the reign of Yariri, the successor of Astiruwa. She is the only deity invoked in it. Sylvia Hutter-Braunsar argues that a temple dedicated to her might have existed in this city, and points out a statuette of a dog has been found in 2012 during the excavations of the structure known as Temple B or the Hilani building. The inscription of Katamuwa from Samʼal also mentions Nikarawa, as well as the deities Hadad of Qrpdl, Hadad of the vineyard, Shamash and Kubaba, and states she was one of the recipients of the offering of a sacrificial ram.

The theonym Nikaruha might also designate the same deity. This form of the name is attested in a curse from Tabal which invokes her alongside Kubaba, and possibly in a damaged inscription from the same ancient kingdom found in Kayseri, which mentions a deity whose name begins with the signs ní-ka.

== Nikarawa and Ninkarrak ==
Ignace J. Gelb proposed identifying Nikarawa with the Mesopotamian goddess Ninkarrak in 1938. In addition to phonetic similarity of the names, he pointed out both of them were associated with dogs. This view more recently received support from Joan Goodnick Westenholz, but it has been subsequently challenged by Sylvia Hutter-Braunsar. She argues that they are unlikely to be one and the same due to distinct function of Nikarawa's dogs, who in contrast with Ninkarrak's were regarded as dangerous. However, the identification is still considered plausible as of 2022, and Irene-Sibbing Plantholt groups the inscription from Carchemish with western attestations of Ninkarrak from Ugarit, Emar, Terqa and Mari.
