= Damu =

Mesopotamian god

- God of medicine
- Major cult center: Isin
- Symbol: scalpel

Genealogy
- Parents: Ninisina (or another medicine goddess) and Pabilsaĝ
- Siblings: Gunura and Šumaḫ

Damu (Sumerian: 𒀭𒁕𒈬) was a Mesopotamian god. While originally regarded as a dying god connected to vegetation, similar to Dumuzi or Ningishzida, with time he acquired the traits of a god of healing. He was regarded as the son of the medicine goddess Ninisina, or of her equivalents such as Gula or Ninkarrak. It is unclear which city was originally associated with him, but he is best attested in association with the cult center of his mother, Isin.

Damu is also a theophoric element in many personal names from Ebla. It has been proposed that in this context the term should be understood as a deified kinship group rather than a deity, and it is assumed it is not connected to the Mesopotamian god.

== Character ==
It is assumed that Damu was originally regarded as a dying god. In that capacity, he might have been associated with trees. He was most likely envisioned as a child, possibly an infant, in contrast with other dying gods who were instead described as young men, and were often referred to with the term g̃uruš, conventionally translated as "lad". Dina Katz suggests that high rates of infant mortality in antiquity influenced traditions pertaining to him, and that the rare examples of passages referring to him as g̃uruš might be the result of conflation of various similar gods.

From the Old Babylonian period onward, Damu was known chiefly as a healing deity instead. This aspect of his character is absent from texts pertaining to his death, which according to Katz might indicate that his character had been altered at some point, likely in the Old Babylonian period. She proposes that the change might had been facilitated by the loss of his original cult center and relocation of his clergy to Isin, where he was incorporated into the circle of the city goddess Ninisina and acquired similar traits as a result; she assumes that the laments which connect the dying Damu with the medicine goddess were composed later. Irene Sibbing-Plantholt instead suggests that Damu originally developed alongside Gunura as an independent deity personifying healing, and in later periods took a role complementary to that played by goddesses associated with this sphere of activity, such as Ninisina.

As a deity linked to healing, Damu could be called an asû, "physician". He could be described as familiar with medicinal plants, as attested in a text from the reign of Sin-Iddinam. It was believed that he was able to find cures for diseases which were regarded as incurable due to this knowledge. As indicated by the incantation Ninisina, mother of the land, he was especially closely associated with care for strings (sa), a term possibly referring to sinew, muscles or blood vessels, envisioned as a single net-like system. There is also evidence that he was regarded as capable of healing headaches (di'u) and the unidentified ašû disease. An incantation refers to him as bēl tākalātim, literally "lord of pouches", though it is presumed the term tākaltu in this context refers to an internal organ, possibly specifically the stomach. A further epithet applied to him was bēl balāṭi, "lord of life", which might hint at a belief that he was able to revive the dead.

Damu's attribute in the role of a medicine god was a karzillu knife, identified as a scalpel by Barbara Böck. Sibbing-Plantholt tentatively suggests that other symbols associated with him might have been a dog and a crook, as they are depicted on a seal with an inscription mentioning him.

In Mesopotamian astronomy, Damu was associated with the constellation Pig. It has been suggested that it might have consisted of stars today regarded as the head and first coil of Draco, though this interpretation is not certain.

== Associations with other deities ==
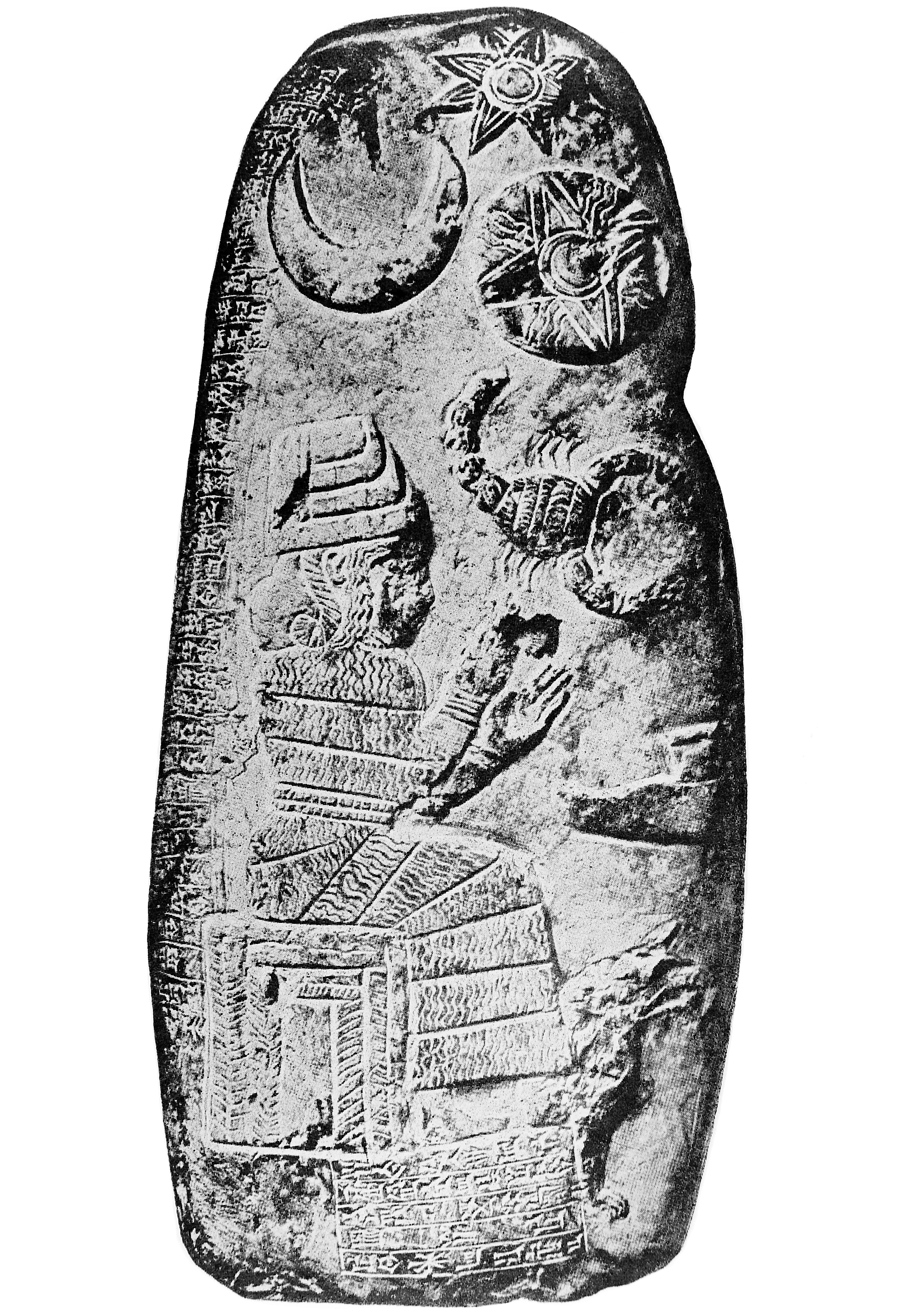
A kudurru with a depiction of Ninisina or Gula.

It is not possible to determine with which deity or deities Damu was originally associated. In earliest god lists, he is typically listed alongside the deities of the state of Lagash, though from the Old Babylonian period onward he started to be placed in the court of Ninisina instead. In the Ur III period, he could be linked to Gula, as attested in offering lists from Ur, but he was also recognized as one of the deities of Isin, in which capacity he was associated with Ninisina instead. His character as a healing deity was also highlighted in particular when he was associated with the latter. Irene Sibbing-Plantholt argues that initially Damu and Gula were paired only as deities whose characters were seen as complementary, and only Ninisina in addition to a similar association was also viewed as his mother. While the latter role is attested for Gula too, for example in the god list An = Anum (tablet V, line 165), it only developed later on. In some bilingual texts, Gula and Damu are instead used as corresponding deities in the two versions. A connection between him and Ninkarrak, also based on similar character and complementary roles in healing, is also known. However, references to Ninkarrak being his mother, while known, are rare. Exclusively in Nippur he was also associated with Nintinugga, as attested in sources from the Ur III period. Dina Katz additionally points out that a lament calls Damu's mother Geshtinluba, the Emesal version of the name of said goddess.

Despite Pabilsaĝ's status as Ninisina husband, there are no sources which would explicitly identify him as Damu's father. He is nonetheless identified as his father by modern authors. His sister was Gunura, and according to Katz they were possibly regarded as siblings even before the development of the tradition in which they were children of Ninisina. A third deity regarded as a child of Ninisina and thus Damu's brother was Šumaḫ.

Irene Sibbing-Plantholt notes that in some cases, when perceived as a son of Ninisina, Damu could be also linked to Enlil, for example healing on behalf of his mother as the "azu-gal of Enlil" in texts from the reign of Sin-Iddinam, and suggests he might have been occasionally perceived as a healing aspect of this god. (Note: However, she speculates that Nintinugga might have been related to a healing aspect of Enlil too, as she was referred to as his šim-mu_{2}, a type of healer associated chiefly with medicinal plants.) In the Lament for Nippur, he is also addressed as the kindagal of this god, literally "barber" or "hairdresser," though it has been noted this term might have designated a type of healer as well. However, it is known chiefly from lexical lists and literary compositions, and it is also possible that it represented a title, rather than a name of a profession. It is possible that the development of a connection between Enlil and Damu was meant to strengthen political ties between Nippur and Isin.

Damu was also associated with Dumuzi. It has been noted that texts focused on Damu show similarity with these pertaining to Dumuzi and other similar prematurely dying deities. However, despite their shared character as dying gods, Damu was not described as a shepherd and was associated with herding animals. A lament which mentions both Damu and a further deity of comparable character, Ningishzida, is also known. Instances where they were identified with each other have been identified too.

An association between Damu and the sparsely attested goddess Kurunnītu has also been noted. They occur as a pair in a kudurru inscription, in parallel with Bau and Zababa and Ninkarrak and Ninurta.

== Worship ==
The original cult center of Damu remains unknown. Girsu or Isin are regarded as the most plausible options. Thorkild Jacobsen proposed that Girsu associated with Damu was not the same as the city located near Lagash, but a different settlement perhaps located on the bank of the Euphrates, but his argument relies entirely on his speculative etymology of this toponym, "prisoner camp", which according to him indicates that there could have been multiple places named Girsu, for which no evidence has been identified in any textual sources. Damu's association with Isin only goes back to the Ur III period in the textual record, which is sometimes considered an argument against viewing him as a god who originated in this city. Yet another proposal is that he originated in Nippur.

A temple of Damu existed in Isin according to Old Babylonian sources, but its ceremonial name is not known. Iddin-Dagan, one of the kings of this city, in a curse formula invoked Damu and Ninisina, referring to them as respectively his lord and lady. Damu is mentioned in a ritual text describing a procession of Ninisina and her court, during which he and Gunura were supposed to be placed right behind their mother. In Nippur Damu was worshiped in the temple of Gula alongside deities such as Kurunnam, Kusu, Urmaḫ, Nuska, Ninimma, Shuzianna, Belet-Seri, the Sebitti, Bēl-ālīya (an anonymous "divine mayor"), Sirash and Ningirzida. He also received offerings in the Ešumeša in the Old Babylonian period alongside numerous other deities, for example Bau, Ninisina, Nintinugga and Pabilsaĝ. Damu is also attested in texts from Larsa and Ur. In the Ur III period he received offerings in the local temple of Gula in the latter city. Andrew R. George suggests that a temple or temples of Damu might have been listed in a lacuna separating the preserved sections focused on Gula and Ninazu in the Canonical Temple List, dated to the Kassite period. A short text from Nineveh listing gods worshiped in the Erabriri, presumably in this context the ceremonial name of the temple of Mandanu in Babylon, states that a seat dedicated to Damu, the E-adgigi, "house of the counselor", was located in it. It has been noted that it is mentioned in this context alongside similar objects dedicated to Gula and other members of her entourage, namely Pabilsaĝ, Gunura and Urmašum.

Many medical formulas end with an invocation of the medicine goddess (either Gula or Ninisina), Damu, and deities connected with incantations: Ea, his son Asalluhi, and the goddess Ningirima:

This is not my incantation, it is the incantation of Ea and Asaluḫi,

It is the incantation of Damu and Gula, It is the incantation of Ningirim, lady of incantation.

They have told it to me and I repeat it.

An example from Ugarit links him with another medicine goddess, Ninkarrak. Other incantations pairing them together are known too:

Let Ninkarrak bandage you with her gentle hands, Let Damu make your suffering pass from you.

It has also been noted that a number of historical asû were apparently involved in the cult of Damu and other deities connected with medicine, though there is no evidence that they functioned as his clergy or that they performed their professional activities in temples.

== Mythology ==
Myths involving Damu deal with his death, and have been compared to compositions such as Ningishzida and Ninazimua, Dumuzi and his sisters, Dumuzi and Geshtinanna, Dumuzi's dream and Inanna's descent. Many of them contain detailed descriptions of grief caused by his disappearance, which have been characterized as "visceral" by researchers. Laments describing his death and separation from his family usually described the location of the underworld in vague terms. One example is the composition For him in the far-off land. Damu is mentioned in a text listing various dying gods and the places of their demise, but the location is not preserved in his case. While the galla demons could be identified as responsible for his death, it was not equally common as associating them with Dumuzi's demise.

In one lament, Damu's mother offers to walk the road to the underworld with him. A neo-Assyrian copy of this text contains the names of nine deities rather than just Damu, even though the original composition is only about him. The other eight deities listed are Ninazu, Ningishzida, Alla, Umunshudi, Ishtaran, Mulusiranna, Amaushumgalanna and "brother of Gesthinanna." Damu himself is placed between Ninazu and Ningishzida in this version. A further difference is the identification of the dying god himself as the narrator.

The death of Damu could also be mentioned in laments related to the cult of Ninisina or Gula, alongside the destruction of the city of Isin and temples located in it. Next to Inanna laments related to the death of Dumuzi, Ninisina laments are the most common among known literary texts of this genre. In one such text, the goddess directs her lamentation over the death of her son to the Eanna temple.

A composition focused on Ninisina referred to in modern literature as Ninisina A deals with the eponymous goddess teaching Damu medical arts. It relays how he was taught by her how to use medical implements and diagnose illnesses:

Ninisina has made perfect the divine powers of medicine, and hands them over to her son, the king of Girsu, the kindly Damu.

"My son, pay attention to everything medical! Damu, pay attention to everything medical!" He takes the bandages and wipes them; he treats the bandages with embrocation, and softens the plaster that had been put on them. He mops up the blood and suppuration, and places a warm hand on the horrid wound. My lady, the midwife of the mothers of the Land, is the chief doctor of the black-headed; Nininsina, the daughter of An, hands this all over to her son, the king of Girsu, the kindly Damu:

"My son, pay attention to everything medical! Damu, pay attention to everything medical! You will be praised for your diagnoses."

== The Eblaite Damu ==
References to Damu from Ebla and Emar are unlikely to be attestations of the same deity as the Mesopotamian Damu. The theophoric element Damu occurs frequently in personal names from the first of these cities. While it likely had its origin in popular religion, it is particularly common among the members of the royal family, with twenty four out of fifty one sons and nine out of thirty one daughters of Eblaite kings having Damu names. Examples include Irkab-Damu and Isar-Damu. At the same time, among women who married into the royal family, who were not otherwise related to it, only three bore Damu names, and it is also comparatively infrequent among members of the family of the viziers Ibrium and Ibbi-Zikir. In Emar, the element Damu appears in the names of four kings who were contemporaries of the rulers known from Eblaite archives.

According to Alfonso Archi, in Eblaite context Damu should be translated as "blood", and refers to the concept of a deified kinship group. (Note: A similar term, Lim, denoted the deified clan, and is attested in Amorite names as well, unlike Damu.) He notes that Damu does not appears in rituals pertaining to the royal family, which invoke various personified deities, such as the city god Kura, his spouse Barama and Išḫara. No such a deity is present in any offering lists from Ebla either.
