= Ninkarrak =

Mesopotamian and Syrian medicine goddess

- Divine physician
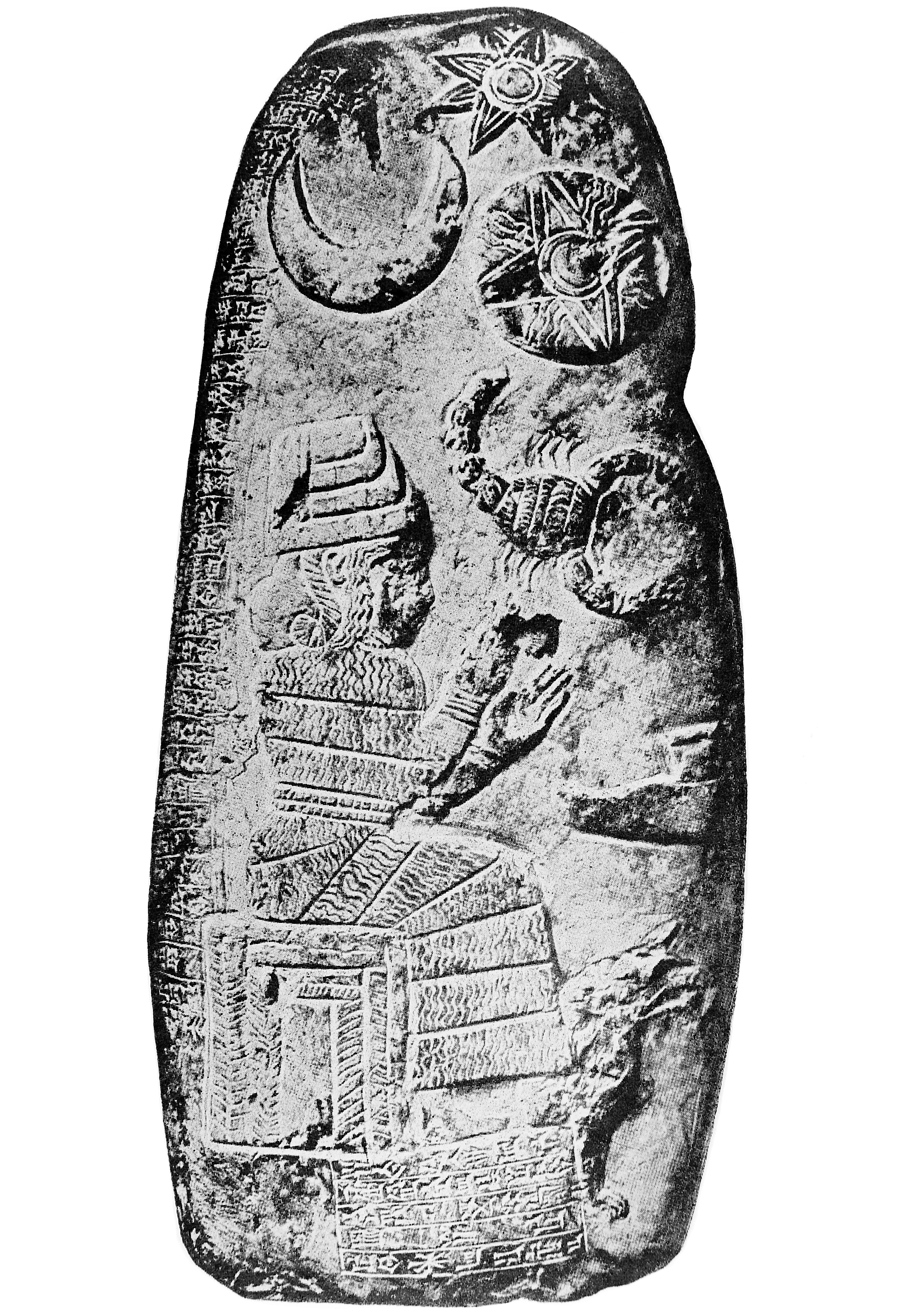
- A depiction of a goddess of medicine on a kudurru includes a dog among her symbols
- Major cult center: Sippar, Terqa
- Symbol: dog

Genealogy
- Parents: Anu and Urash
- Consort: usually none, but sometimes Pabilsag
- Children: Damu

Equivalents
- Isin: Ninisina
- Umma: Gula
- Nippur: Nintinugga
- Luwian: Nikarawa

Ninkarrak (Akkadian: 𒀭𒊩𒌆𒋼𒀀𒊏𒀝, ^{d}nin-kar-ra-ak) was a goddess of medicine worshiped chiefly in northern Mesopotamia and Syria. It has been proposed that her name originates in either Akkadian or an unidentified substrate language possibly spoken in parts of modern Syria, rather than in Sumerian. It is presumed that inconsistent orthography reflects ancient scholarly attempts at making it more closely resemble Sumerian theonyms. The best attested temples dedicated to her existed in Sippar (in modern Iraq) and in Terqa (in modern Syria). Finds from excavations undertaken at the site of the latter were used as evidence in more precisely dating the history of the region. Further attestations are available from northern Mesopotamia, including the kingdom of Apum, Assyria, and the Diyala area, from various southern Mesopotamian cities such as Larsa, Nippur, and possibly Uruk, as well as from Ugarit and Emar. It is possible that references to "Ninkar" from the texts from Ebla and Nikarawa, attested in Luwian inscriptions from Carchemish, were about Ninkarrak.

Like a number of other healing goddesses, Ninkarrak was described as a divine physician. She shared her role in the Mesopotamian pantheon with deities such as Gula, Ninisina, Nintinugga, and Bau. Dogs frequently are found associated with Ninkarrak and are interpreted as a symbol for her as well as for multiple other divine physician goddesses. While she was sometimes identified with other similar deities, certain traits were unique to her. Together with the distribution of evidence of her cult they serve as an indication that even if partially syncretised, individual Mesopotamian goddesses of medicine had distinct origins. It is possible that Ninkarrak only developed into a healing goddess due to already being associated with disease in curse formulas, in which she appears frequently as early as in the Akkadian Empire. In the context of those texts she could be paired with Išḫara.

== Name and origin ==
While the standard spelling of Ninkarrak's name is ^{d}nin-kar-ra-ak, it is not attested before the second millennium BCE, and the orthography shows a degree of variety in cuneiform texts. Spellings from the Ur III period include ^{d}nin-kar_{7} and ^{d}nin-kar-ra, while in texts from the Old Babylonian period, forms such as ^{d}nin-kar, ^{d}nin-kar-ra, ^{d}nin-kar-ak, ^{d}nin-ni-ka-ra-ak, ^{d}nin-kar-ak, ^{d}nin-ḫar-ra (from Mari), and possibly ^{d}nin-ḫar-ra-ak and ^{d}nin-kar_{2} may be found. In Ugarit, her name was written as ni-ka-rak_{x}(rik_{2}), while in an incantation from Alalakh a damaged name has been restored tentatively as ne-ni-ka-ra-ak. Two further spellings, ^{d}nin-kar_{2}-ra-ak(-a)_{2} and ^{d}nin-ka-rak appear in Neo-Babylonian sources, despite the standard spelling being generally employed consistently through the Middle Babylonian period. A logographic writing of the name, ^{d}NIN.IN.DUB, is likely derived from ^{d}NIN.IN, used to represent the name of another goddess of medicine, Ninisina, although according to Antoine Cavigneaux and Manfred Krebernik, a second and less likely possibility is that it was based on a connection with the term indub, "embankment." The deity list An = Anum also gives Ninekisiga, possibly to be understood as "lady of the house of funerary offerings," as an alternate name of Ninkarrak.

The etymology of the theonym, Ninkarrak, is unknown. Early Assyriologist Knut Tallqvist understood it as a topographical name, "Lady (Nin) of Karrak". William W. Hallo, expanding on this proposal, suggested that it might have been derived from the name of the city of Larak, which would require a hypothetical form Lakrak to be in use at some point, eventually leading to the spelling Karrak, although this suggestion was evaluated critically by Manfred Krebernik. Thorkild Jacobsen suggested derivation from the genitive form of the Sumerian word kar ("harbor", "quay") in the 1970s. This view is also accepted by a number of other researchers. Maurice Lambert in the 1950s and Piotr Steinkeller in the 1990s both suggested that Ninkarrak's name was an allusion to prostitution, arguing it can be translated roughly as "the one who 'does' the harbour", in their proposal a to be understood as synonym of "prostitute". Irene Sibbing-Plantholt notes that past popularity of this proposal relied on the presumption that goddesses were connected to supposed practices of "temple prostitution." Joan Goodnick Westenholz rejected this view due to lack of a connection to Ninkarrak's sphere of activity. Douglas Frayne suggested that the name was a phonetic Akkadian rendering of Sumerian nin-gir-ak, "Lady of the scalpel" (with ak being a genitive ending), although this view is generally considered implausible. Sibbing-Plantholt proposes the derivation from nin-kara_{2}, "Lady of the mourning cloth", which according to her would fit Ninkarrak's "liminality," although in her survey of past scholarship on the matter, she ultimately concludes that none of the proposals can be accepted with certainty, and she agrees with the view that the variable orthography and apparent lack of connection between the meaning of the sign "KAR" and Ninkarrak's character might indicate that her name did not originate in Sumerian. Westenholz, who also voiced support for this view, pointed out Ninkarrak's name is absent from glossaries of dialectical emesal forms, which would be expected for a Sumerian theonym, although this argument is not accepted by Sibbing-Plantholt as convincing evidence. Westenholz argued that the name was of foreign origin (much like these of Tishpak or the Dilmunite deities Inzak and Meskilak) and the addition of the sign NIN was meant to make it resemble Sumerian theonyms, which often started with this sign (examples include Ningirsu and Ninisina). This view is also supported by Sibbing-Plantholt, who concludes that the Sumerian appearance of the name "could (...) have been carefully created by scholars who attempted to give the goddess a meaningful position within the religious framework". Westenholz proposed that Ninkarrak might have originally been one of the deities whose names belong to a proposed substratum, originally proposed by Alfonso Archi. It has been argued that a number of deities known from sources from various ancient cities located in modern Syria bear names that originally came from an unknown language predating the era of predominance of speakers of Semitic languages and Hurrian in the region. The proposed category of "Syrian substratum" deities includes a number of deities for the most part first attested in Ebla: Kura, Barama, Hadabal, Adamma, Išḫara, Aštabi, as well as Kubaba. Dagan, the main deity of the upper Euphrates area, is regarded as a "substratum" deity in some recent studies too due to the implausibility of various proposed etymologies of his name.

According to Westenholz's proposal, the area where Ninkarrak was originally worshiped "could be in the Habur river basin, one side of the triangle formed by the Habur river ending at Terqa and the other side by the Tigris river ending at Akkad". However, it is generally accepted that the point of origin for Ninkarrak should be considered uncertain in the light of available evidence.

=== Eblaite Ninkar ===
Joan Goodnick Westenholz proposed that the name "Ninkar" attested in texts from Ebla, stand for Ninkarrak rather than the similarly named, but more obscure southern Mesopotamian goddess of daylight. Occasional shortening of Ninkarrak's name to "Ninkar" is known from Mesopotamian sources as well. This theory is also accepted by Alfonso Archi, who notes that identification of the Eblaite Ninkar with a minor Sumerian goddess of daylight would make it difficult to explain why devotion to her is relatively common, for example among women of the royal house. Irene Sibbing-Plantholt also presumes Ninkarrak was worshiped in Ebla.

=== Luwian Nikarawa ===
It is possible that Ninkarrak, under the name Nikarawa (^{d}ni-ka+ra/i-wa/i-sa_{2}), appears in a hieroglyphic Luwian inscription from Carchemish, which asks the goddess' dogs to devour anyone who damages the inscribed monument. The identification of Nikarawa with Ninkarrak has a long history in modern scholarship. Ignace Gelb already proposed it in his translation of the Carchemish inscription in 1938. That translation has been challenged in a recent publication by Sylvia Hutter-Braunsar, although as of 2022, the identification of Nikarawa as an alternate spelling of Ninkarrak's name is still regarded as plausible.

== Character ==
Ninkarrak was regarded as a healing goddess and functioned as a divine physician. Evidence from deity lists such as An = Anum indicates that theologians perceived her as the default Akkadian goddess of medicine. Šurpu addresses her as the "great doctoress"(azugallatu). Mesopotamian goddesses associated with medicine were portrayed as surgeons in literary texts, cleaning wounds and applying bandages. One healing incantation invokes Ninkarrak with the formula "May Ninkarrak bandage you with her gentle hands". Her other area of expertise was believed to be exorcisms. As attested for the first time in texts from the Old Assyrian period, she could be invoked to ward off the demon Lamashtu, which is also attested for Ninisina and might indicate that healing goddesses were viewed as guardians of pregnant women, as well as mothers and newborns, who are demographic groups particularly endangered by this creature according to Mesopotamian beliefs. Notably Ninkarrak was not described as a divine midwife, however.

Ninkarrak was also invoked in curses. In this capacity, she was implored to inflict various diseases upon potential transgressors, which led Jan Assmann to refer to her as the "goddess of maladies". Irene Sibbing-Plantholt goes as far as suggesting that Ninkarrak might have been primarily a curse deity, and only acquired an association with healing as an extension of this role. She already appears in a curse formula from the reign of Naram-Sin of Akkad. The Babylonian king Hammurabi invoked Ninkarrak in a curse formula on one of his steles, calling her the "goddess who promotes my cause at the Ekur temple" and imploring her to punish anyone who damages the monuments with diseases "which a physician cannot diagnose".

References were often made to Ninkarrak's dogs, which were regarded as fearsome. She can be identified on seals from Sippar through the presence of these animals. A dog statuette was found during excavations of her temple in Terqa. However, according to Sibbing-Plantholt it is not certain whether Ninkarrak's connection with dogs necessarily reflects her role as a healing deity, and might instead reflect the liminal character of dogs in Mesopotamian beliefs.

== Associations with other deities ==
Ninkarrak was usually not paired with any male deities, although sometimes she appears in association with Pabilsag, who could also function as the husband of other medicine goddesses. They appear together on two seals from the Old Babylonian period. Anu was consistently regarded as Ninkarrak's father while her mother was Urash, which indicates that her parentage was understood to be identical to that of Ninisina, another healing goddess. The son of the latter goddess, Damu, was sometimes said to be Ninkarrak's child instead. They appear together in incantations. However, with the exception of a single bilingual text, Ninkarrak was never associated with the daughter of Ninisina, Gunura.

The deity list An = Anum equates the goddess NIN-ĝaʾuga (reading of the first sign uncertain, with ereš and égi both being possibilities), the wife of the god Lugalabba, with Ninkarrak, although in the Emesal Vocabulary she corresponds to Gula instead, and a text where in different copies her name alternates with Ninmug's is known too.

Irene Sibbing-Plantholt points out that parallels may be drawn between the roles of Ninkarrak and the rainbow goddess Manzat in treaties.

In a hymn dedicated to Nanaya, this goddess compares herself to Ninkarrak.

=== Išḫara ===
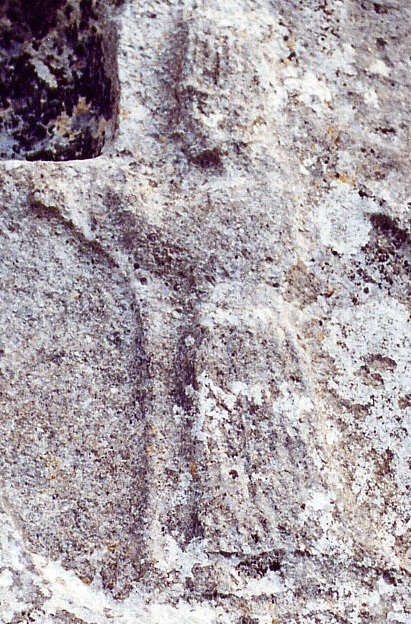
A Hurro-Hittite relief from Yazılıkaya depicting Išḫara

Multiple sources attest the existence of a connection between Ninkarrak and Išḫara, a goddess first attested in sources from Ebla, later worshiped by various cultures of Mesopotamia, as well as by Hurrians and Hittites. She was believed to be capable of both inflicting and, if placated, curing illnesses, but she also functioned as a love goddess and was associated with the underworld and by extension with the goddess Allani. Examples of texts that mention Išḫara together with Ninkarrak include an Old Assyrian treaty, offering lists from Sippar and Mari, and especially, in curse formulas. Additionally, both appear in Naram-Sin's treaty with Elam, although not next to each other. Joan Goodnick Westenholz presumed that the link between the deities was based on their shared origin in what is modern Syria, while Irene Sibbing-Plantholt refers more broadly to both of them as being worshiped in the "Western and Eastern fringes of Mesopotamia" and identifies that as the cause. She also proposes that since Ninkarrak was associated with dogs and Išḫara with either snakes or scorpions, they might have been perceived as complementary deities, due to their animal symbols.

The name Meme is attributed to both Išḫara and Ninkarrak in their respective sections of the deity list An = Anum.

=== Other healing goddesses ===
In addition to Ninkarrak, multiple other healing goddesses belonged to the Mesopotamian pantheon, among them Ninisina (from Isin), Nintinugga (from Nippur), Gula (possibly originally from Umma), and Bau. While they formed an interconnected network, and could be treated as equivalents or conflated, all of them were initially separate from each other. The differences among individual deities were particularly pronounced in the sphere of cult, in contrast with theology. In the Weidner list, Ninkarrak, Gula, and Ninisina occur separately from each other, which indicates they were viewed as separate from each other at the time of its composition. However, as noted by Joan Goodnick Westenholz, the study of Ninkarrak as an independent deity was nonetheless neglected in Assyriology in the past, with no dedicated studies published between 1918 and 2010, and no separate entry in the Reallexikon der Assyriologie und Vorderasiatischen Archäologie.

Ninkarrak was commonly associated with both Gula and Ninisina, who were interchangeable to a degree. An association between her and the latter of these two goddesses is first attested in the Ur III period. In bilingual texts, Ninkarrak often appears in the Akkadian version, while Ninisina - in Sumerian. One example is the text known as, Ninisina's Journey to Nippur. In the late hymn to Ninisina, Ninkarrak appears as one of her names, described as be-let rik-si up-ša_{2}-še-e, "lady of bandages (and) magical actions". Irene Sibbing-Plantholt notes that a difference between the respective characters of Ninkarrak and Ninisina is, that the former was not typically described as motherly, in contrast with the latter who was.

A syncretistic hymn to Gula composed at some point between 1400 BCE and 700 BCE by Bulluṭsa-rabi equates her with a number of other goddesses, including Ninkarrak, but also Bau, Ninsun, Nanshe, Ninigizibara, and more. At the same time, each section appears to preserve information about the original character of the goddess mentioned in it. The one dedicated to Ninkarrak does not describe her abilities as a healer, but rather highlights her high status.

In a version of the literary text Great Revolt against Narām-Sîn from Mari, Ninkarrak is mentioned in association with the coronation of Ipḫur-Kiši, although in another copy Gula appears instead, and the temple present in the same passage, Esabad, belonged to Ninisina. A degree of interchangeability between Ninkarrak and Ninisina and between Ninkarrak and Gula is attested in sources from Sippar, as attested variable writing of both toponyms and theophoric names (for example, the same man appears as "Puzur-Ninkarrak" in one document and as "Puzur-Gula" in another). According to Barbara Böck it is possible that large-scale migration from Isin was responsible for this phenomenon. Irene Sibbing-Plantholt notes that since Ninkarrak was worshiped there for longer than the other two goddesses, who are much more sparsely attested, their names were likely treated as her "cognomina" locally. Equally close connection between Ninkarrak and Gula is otherwise unattested. A difference between them has been identified based on curse formulas, where only Ninkarrak was invoked to bring incurable diseases.

In Mari, Kakka, seemingly a local healing goddess, was associated with Ninkarrak, but also with Ninshubur. This local goddess is regarded as distinct from Kakka, the sukkal of Anshar, who is known from the deity list An = Anum (where the former Kakka appears in Ninkarrak's section) and from the later myth, Enuma Elish.

== Worship ==
The oldest certain attestation of Ninkarrak occurs in the treaty between Naram-Sin of Akkad and an Elamite ruler. According to Daniel T. Potts, she is one of the four deities from the Sumero-Akkadian pantheon mentioned in it, the other four being Ninurta, Ilaba, Išḫara, and Manzat, while the remaining twenty six are Elamite and include, among others, Inshushinak, Humban, Hutran, Pinikir, and Simut. Her inclusion might indicate that she belonged to the state pantheon of the Akkadian Empire, although it is also possible her inclusion depended instead, on the presence of her cult in areas bordering with Elam. A number of further possible early references are uncertain, as it is not clear when the writing ^{d}nin-kar refers to Ninkarrak and when to the goddess of daylight, Ninkar, who was regarded as analogous to Aya. Joan Goodnick Westenholz argued that the latter is known only from Girsu, while Irene Sibbing-Plantholt maintains a more cautious approach, and concludes that it remains uncertain which goddess is meant in early sources such as the Abu Salabikh deity list. Other certain early attestations have been identified in incantations, inscriptions, theophoric names, and toponyms from the Old Akkadian and Ur III periods, although in deity lists, Ninkarrak's name is not attested before the Old Babylonian period.

=== Sippar ===
The worship of Ninkarrak is well attested in sources from Sippar, although it is not certain whether she was present in the local pantheon before the Old Babylonian period or, whether she only was introduced there during the reign of Immerum, perhaps from the Diyala area. A temple dedicated to her already existed there in the Old Babylonian period. It bore the ceremonial name Eulla, "house of rejoicing". The temple might have owned property in the city, as indicated by a reference to a field of Ninkarrak. A year name of Buntaḫtun-ila, a local ruler of Sippar contemporary with Sumulael, states that he brought a lilissu drum to her temple. A gate and a district of the city also were named after her. She also occurs in theophoric names, such as Puzur-Ninkarrak and Ṣilli-Ninkarrak. One bearer of the latter name was a scribe during the reign of Hammurabi of Babylon.

In sources from Middle Babylonian Sippar, her name occurs only on a single kudurru (boundary stone) inscription, which states that if anyone will transgress the listed regulations, Ninkarrak will "take away his seed". Attestations from the Kassite and Middle Babylonian periods are infrequent overall: her name is only mentioned on three kudurru, never in clear association with a specific figure depicted, and on a single seal.

Neo-Babylonian king Nebuchadnezzar II, who reigned from 605 to 562 BCE, apparently was devoted to Ninkarrak and rebuilt the Eulla. Eight copies of an inscription commemorating this event are presently known. The king states that he was tasked by Marduk with repairing it, and describes its previous state in the following terms: "the temple had not been kept in good repair, so that its ground plan had become obliterated and its outlines unrecognizable, covered with dust, (which) was no longer named together with the sanctuaries of the gods, (whose) regular offerings were cut off, they ceased to be mentioned, the cereal offerings were discontinued". He also built temples dedicated to Ninkarrak in Borsippa and Babylon. The latter, Ehursagsikilla, "house, pure mountain", survived as late as the Parthian period. A number of sources refer to it as a temple of Gula instead. Andrew R. George refers to it as belonging to "Gula-Ninkarrak" and tentatively proposes that it was the same house of worship as the Egalmah. Joan Goodnick Westenholz describes the temple in Borsippa in similar terms.

=== Terqa ===
Ninkarrak was also present in the pantheon of the middle Euphrates area. In Mari, she appears in a list of deities and offerings to them from the reign of Zimri-Lim and in therapeutic incantations. She was particularly strongly associated with nearby Terqa. A temple excavated in that city has been identified as one dedicated to Ninkarrak. The identification was based on finds that include a tablet with a list of offerings that starts with her name (most likely used as a point of reference by priests maintaining it), as well as seals mentioning her, and other epigraphic evidence. Among the items excavated were 6637 beads made out of a variety of materials (agate, carnelian, gypsum, hematite, lapis lazuli, and rock crystal), including some shaped as animals (a frog, a cow, and a duck) as well as nine Egyptian-style scarabs, all of which likely were intended as an offering to Ninkarrak or a were a temple deposit. Archaeologists found a number of small bronze figurines of dogs inside the temple as well. Further excavations additionally uncovered a ceremonial axe and a scimitar with a devotional inscription mentioning Ninkarrak, both made out of bronze.

Early occupation of the structure has been dated to roughly the same period as the reigns of three kings of Terqa:

- Yadikh-abu, a contemporary of Samsuiluna of Babylon, defeated by the latter in 1721 BCE
- Kashtiliash, initially estimated as ruling c. 1690 BCE a date later than 1650 BCE has been proposed as well, based on closer analysis of artifacts. The beads, likely serving as a temple deposit, were specifically dated to his reign. His name has Kassite origin.
- Shunuhru-ammu, ruling c. 1650 BCE according to the initial estimates.

However, the temple remained in use later as well. and archaeologists speculate that the temple was remodeled multiple times.

The scarabs from the temple of Ninkarrak are considered a find of particular achaeoloigcal importance, as they represent the easternmost known location where such objects have been found in a sealed deposit dated to the Old Babylonian period. The excavation made it possible to date the artifacts with relative accuracy as certain features evident in them are not attested before 1650-1640 BCE (the reign of the Fifteenth Dynasty of Egypt). The hieroglyphs inscribed on them are regarded as "poorly executed and sometimes misunderstood", indicating Levantine, rather than Egyptian, origin, with similar ones being known from Byblos, Sidon, and Ugarit.

=== Other Mesopotamian attestations ===
In documents from the Old Assyrian period Ninkarrak is the only healing goddess attested, and a reference to the property of a temple dedicated to her is known. Later Assyrian sources mentioning her include the Tākultu text, listing deities greeted by the king during a long ritual and a number of hymns from Assur, although she was not a major goddess in this area in the first millennium BCE. In the kingdom of Apum, also located in the north of Mesopotamia in the upper Khabur valley, she was one of the deities invoked in oath formulas in treaties, and a statue of her might have been present during related ceremonies. However, Klaas R. Veenhof argues that it cannot be said for sure whether Ninkarrak appears in documents from this kingdom as a local deity or whether she belonged instead to the pantheon of the other signatory of the treaty.

A temple of Ninkarrak was located somewhere in the proximity of the Diyala River, although its ceremonial name and precise location are unknown. It is known that she was worshiped in Shaduppum, where a festival involving offerings of sesame oil was held in her honor, in Išḫali, where she is attested in incantations, and in Nuzi, where she appears in the theophoric names (Ninkarrak-ummī and Ninkarrak-ṣillī).

Ninkarrak also was worshiped in locations more closely related to the cults of other healing goddesses: she had a small chapel in Nippur (where the main healing goddess was Nintinugga) and she is also present in a small number of personal names from Nippur. It also is possible that she was worshiped at a site in Isin. A year name of one of the kings from the dynasty of Isin, Suen-magir, mentions the digging of a canal named after her.

While she is overall sparsely attested in sources from the Mesopotamian heartland before the end of the Old Babylonian period, sporadic references to her are also known from the southernmost cities, notably Larsa and Uruk. However, in the latter case the only evidence is a letter with the formula "just as I do not turn my back on Ninkarrak, I do not turn my back on you", which might only reflect the personal devotion of the author or the professional community he belonged to, and as such, does not necessarily confirm that she belonged to the local pantheon.

=== Outside Mesopotamia ===
A goddess known from texts from Ebla who might correspond to Ninkarrak, Ninkar, appears in one of the offering lists, following Resheph of Hadani and his spouse Adamma. An offering of a mace to her is also attested, although Alfonso Archi considers it to be unusual.

Attestations of Ninkarrak are known from sources from both Emar and Ugarit in modern Syria and according to Joan Goodnick Westenholz, might support the theory that she originated in the northwest of Mesopotamia. In Emar, she had no temple and does not appear in theophoric names. A curse formula invokes her alongside Išḫara and implores both of them to react if anyone damages the rest of the text by destroying "his seed and his name". In Ugarit, she is mentioned in a medical formula against eye disease written in Akkadian. It is presumed to have Babylonian origin. In addition to Ninkarrak, the formula also invokes Damu. Both of them are mentioned in an incantation against the demon Lamashtu from the same city as well, in this case following the pair Ea and Asalluḫi.

A copy of the Adapa myth from Amarna, presumably a part of a scribal school curriculum, mentions Ninkarrak.
