= Ninigizibara =

Mesopotamian goddess representing a string instrument

Ningizibara
- Divine representation of the balaĝ instrument
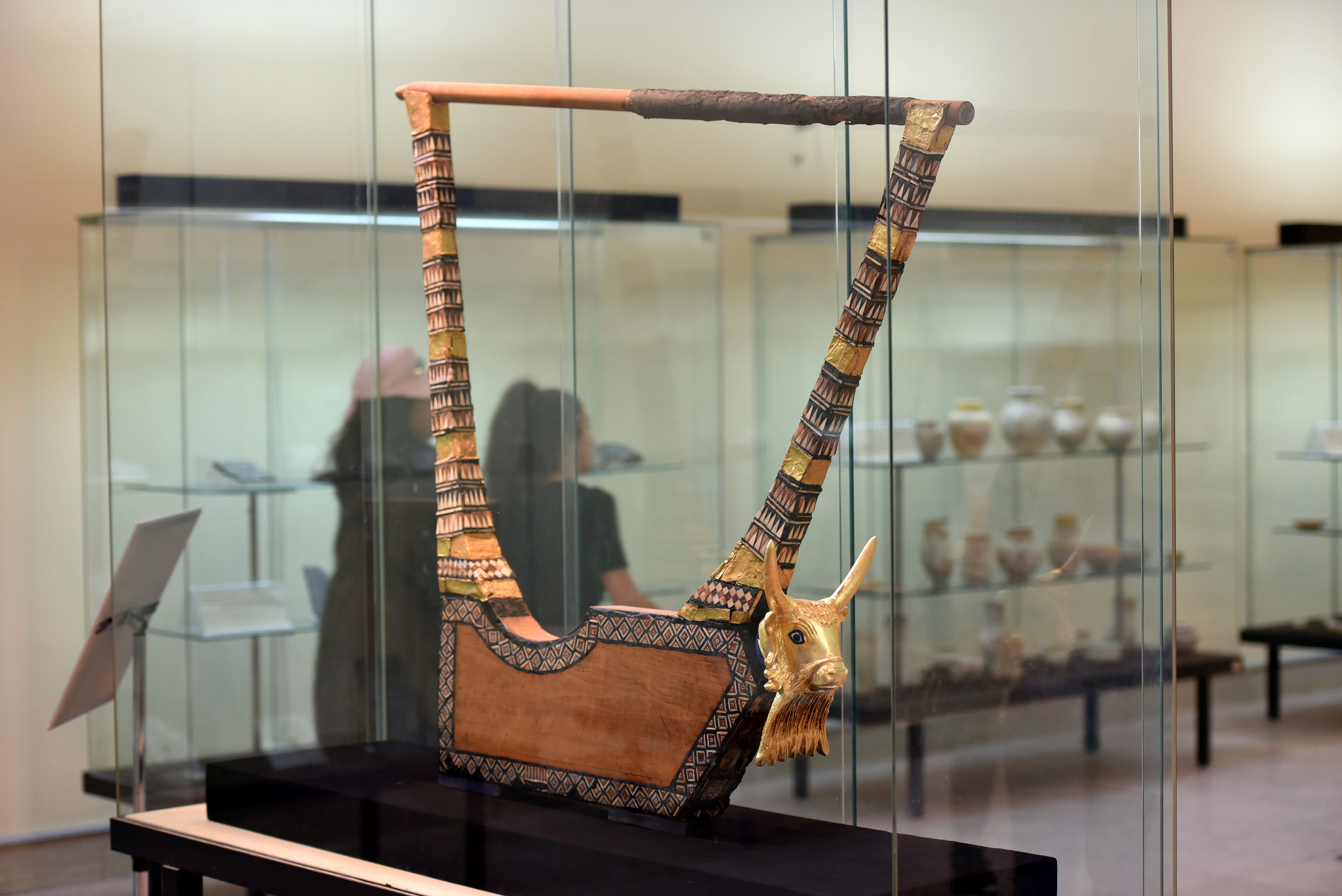
- Replica of one of the lyres of Ur, presumed to be an example of the balaĝ instrument. Iraq Museum.
- Major cult center: Umma, Uruk

Ningizibara, also known as Igizibara and Ningizippara, was a Mesopotamian goddess associated with the balaĝ instrument, usually assumed to be a type of lyre. She could be regarded both as a physical instrument and as a minor deity. In both cases, she was associated with the goddess Inanna. A connection between her and the medicine goddess Gula is also attested, and it is possible she could serve as a minor healing deity herself.

== Character ==
Ninigizibara's name most likely means "well regarded lady" in Sumerian. Another possibility is to translate it as "lady with a noble gaze". In Umma, the name was written without the NIN sign, and the goddess was called Igizibara, "well regarded". In texts from Mari the usual spelling is Ningizippara.

Ninigizibara was both the name of a goddess and of individual instruments placed in a number of temples of Inanna. The instrument represented by her was the balaĝ. The precise meaning of this Sumerian term is a matter of scholarly debate, though it is generally accepted that it referred first and foremost to a type of string instrument. Some translators, for example Wolfgang Heimpel, favor interpreting balaĝ as a harp, but Uri Gabbay argues the available evidence makes it more likely that it was a lyre. This conclusion is also supported by Dahlia Shehata, who points out that possible references to two people playing a balaĝ at once makes it more plausible to interpret it as a large standing lyre than as a harp. The argument on the contrary depends on the reading of a harp-like archaic cuneiform sign as analogous to the later sign BALAG referring to the instrument, which remains unproven. The lyres from the Royal Cemetery at Ur have been identified as a possible example of the balaĝ. The use of this instrument during funerals is well attested. Balaĝ was also a type of prayers accompanied by music, which later led to the use of the term to refer to another instrument associated with them, a type of kettledrum called lilissu. However, Ninigizibara herself was never regarded as a drum.

The name of the position held by Ninigizibara in the court of Inanna was written in cuneiform as GU_{4}.BALAG, which can be literally translated from Sumerian as "balaĝ-bull", most likely a reference to the bull-shaped decorations on the sound box of the instrument. However, the signs also served as a logographic writing of the Akkadian word mundalku, "counselor" or "advisor." An analogous term was ad-gi_{4}-gi_{4}, which also could designate both a type of deity and the balaĝ instrument. Uri Gabbay characterizes the role of deities designated as mundalku as that of "minor gods who participate in the deliberations of the great gods, representing humanity," and notes that they were most likely believed to "soothe the angry heart of the deity," similar to the music associated with them.

=== As a medicine goddess ===
In Bulluṭsa-rabi's Hymn to Gula, Nigizibara is one of the deities syncretised with the eponymous medicine goddess. Other goddesses mentioned in it include Nintinugga, Ninkarrak, Bau, Ungal-Nibru, Ninsun and Ninlil. Wolfgang Heimpel argues that it is impossible that the same goddess as the divine musician is meant in this passage. However, as pointed by Joan Goodnick Westenholz, Ninigizibara was associated both with Inanna (under the name Ninibgal) but also with Gula in Umma, where she took part in a procession of both of these goddesses to Zabalam. She proposed that this might be a sign that an association between her and Gula had a long history. Barbara Böck also considers it likely that there was only one Ninigizibara, associated with both Inanna and Gula. She points out a medicinal plant, bu'šānu, was also called "Ninigizibarra's dog". Its association with Gula is well attested, and it could be called "Gula's dog" as well. Its name was homonymous with a word designating a disease, most likely diphtheria. Böck also points out Ninizigibara is also attested in association with another medicine goddess, Ninisina, the tutelary deity of Isin, whose entourage overlaps to a degree with Inanna's. (Note: While the healing goddesses of the Mesopotamian pantheon - Ninisina, Gula, Nintinugga and Ninkarrak - were initially separate deities, they were at times either partially conflated or treated as equivalents of each other.) Attempts have been made to prove that Ninigizibara originally belonged to the circle of Ninisina rather than Inanna, and only came to be linked to the latter through syncretism between these two goddesses, but the evidence supporting this proposal is limited.

== Worship ==
Ninigizibarra was chiefly worshiped in Uruk and in Umma. In the latter city, she took part in a procession of Inanna (locally referred to with the epithet Ninibgal) to nearby Zabalam. A reference to Ninigizibara (under the name Igizibara) receiving offerings in a temple of Shara, the local tutelary deity, is also known from this city. She is also attested in the theophoric name Ur-Igizibara.

An offering list from Uruk mentions Ningiizibara alongside Nanaya and gates of a sanctuary of Inanna. During the Akitu festival held in Uruk in the Seleucid period, she was among the deities who took part in a procession led by Ishtar. Among its other participants were Ninsun, Ninsianna and Nanaya. According to Julia Krul, it is impossible to tell if worship of Ninigizibara was a continuous element of the religion of Uruk. She considers it more likely that the priests active in the late first millennium BCE introduced or reintroduced various minor goddesses from god lists such as An = Anum to the pantheon of the city as part of an effort to restructure Ishtar's retinue to make it as theologically complete as possible. Uri Gabbay points out there is also no indication that she was still understood as a deified instrument in this period. Ninigizibara is absent from records from the Neo-Babylonian period, such as the Eanna archive. She is also absent from legal texts and from theophoric names from Seleucid Uruk.

Some attestations of Ninigizibara are also known from other cities of ancient Mesopotamia. A year formula from the twenty first year of the reign of Ibbi-Sin of Ur states that he "fashioned the balaĝ, (the divine) Ninigizibara" for Inanna. An offering to Ninigizibara and the goddess Ninme ("lady of battle"), possibly an epithet of Inanna, is also mentioned in a document from the reign of Sumu-El presumed to originate in Larsa. A list of barley provisions from Sippar-Amnanum indicates that Ninigizibara was also worshiped in this city. She is listed after Annunitum, Ulmašītum and Inanna. She is also attested to the west of Babylonia, in Mari and Tuttul in modern Syria. In the latter city, the instrument referred to as "Ningizippara" was covered with four pounds of silver and five shekels of gold. In Mari, in addition to religious texts, she is also attested in a school exercise listing various deities whose names start with the sign NIN. She is paired in it with Nindagalzu, another similar musician goddess, associated with Ningal rather than Inanna.

== In Mesopotamian literature ==
Ninigizibarra appears in the balaĝ song Uru-Ama'irabi, which was performed on the instrument sharing her name in Mari during a ritual dedicated to Ishtar. Its lyrics describe how Inanna learned about a sacrilege committed in her bed in her absence. It has been suggested that even though known from a site in the west, it most likely reflects the cultic journey of Inanna and Ninigizibara attested in texts from Umma. In the song Ninigizibara appears alongside Ninmeurur. Both of them are described as Inanna's advisors (ad-gi_{4}-gi_{4}). Ninmeurur (Sumerian: "lady who collects all the me") also appears next to Ninigizibara and yet another minor goddess from Inanna's entourage, Ninḫinuna, in the Isin god list.

In a single late copy of Uru-Ama'irabi an Akkadian gloss refers to Ninigizibara as a male deity; later on in the same manuscript identifies him as Inanna's husband. Wolfgang Heimpel considers this attestation to be dubious evidence for Ninigizibara being perceived as male, as elsewhere the composition refers to Dumuzi as Inanna's husband, and the sign nin in Ninigibzara's name is translated into Emesal as feminine gašan. However, he also states that Igizibara is attested as a male given name in the third millennium BCE, up to the Ur III period, and that one of the inscriptions of Gudea refers to him as the igizibara of Nanshe.

== See also ==
- Bull Headed Lyre of Ur
- Music of Mesopotamia
