= Ašipu =

Ancient Mesopotamian priest

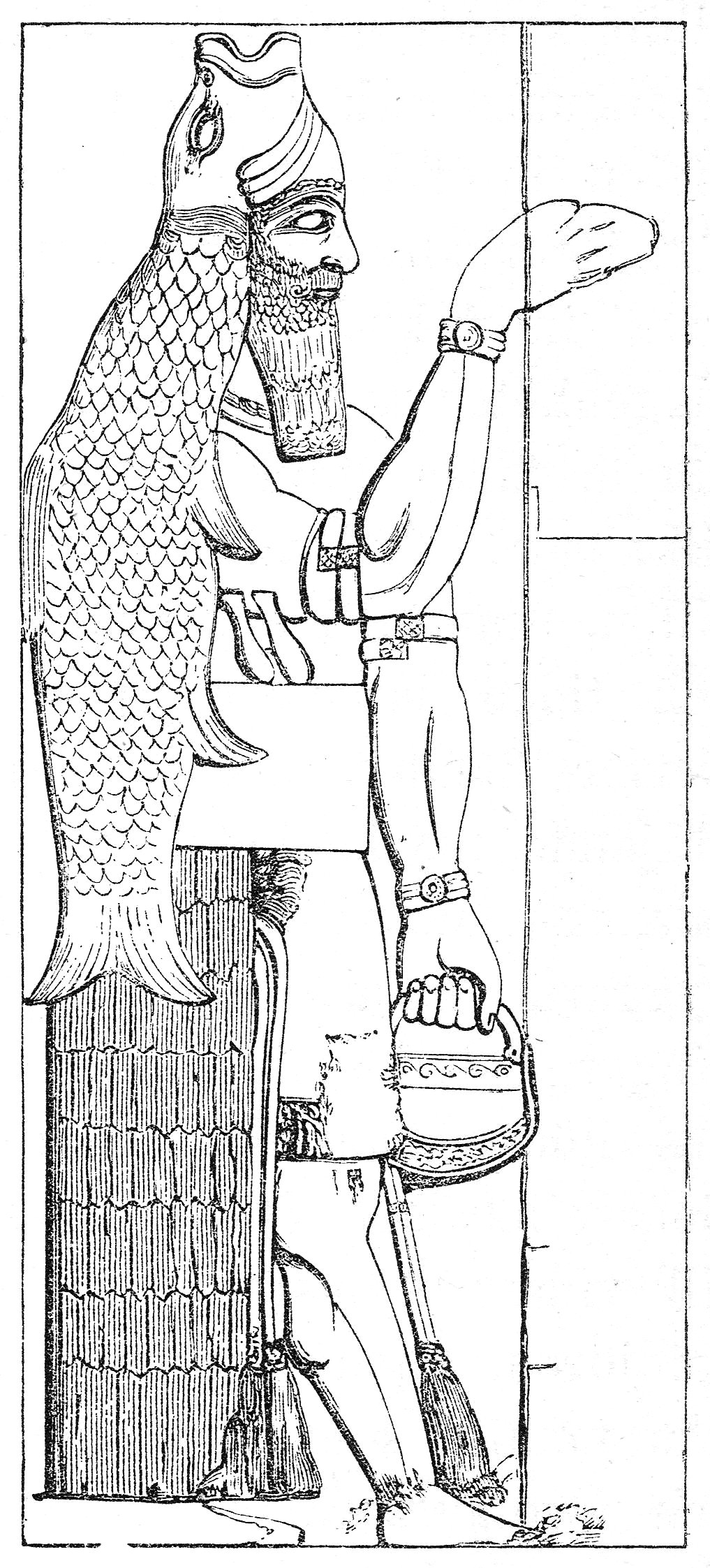
Monumental stone relief (probably) of an Apkallu figure from the Temple of Ninurta in the Assyrian city of Kalhu, formerly believed by some experts to be a representation of an āšipu "exorcist-priest", who functioned as a healer and doctor

In ancient Mesopotamia, the ašipu (also āšipu or mašmaššu) acted as priests. They were scholars and practitioners of diagnosis and treatment in the Tigris and Euphrates valley (now Iraq) around 3200 BC.

== Etymology ==
Sumerian and Akkadian ritual and incantation texts were associated with one specific profession, the expert called in Akkadian āšipu or mašmaššu, which is translated as “exorcist". The cuneiform record formed the lore of their practice translating āšipūtu as “exorcistic lore” or, simply, “magic”. Schwemer explains that Babylonian tradition itself "considered this corpus of texts to be of great antiquity, ultimately authored by Enki-Ea himself, the god of wisdom and exorcism."

== Expertise ==
Some have described ašipu as experts in white magic. At the time, ideas of science, religion and witchcraft were closely intertwined and formed a basis of ašiputu, the practice used by ašipu to combat sorcery and to heal disease. The ašipu studied omens and symptoms to formulate a prediction of the future for a subject and then performed apotropaic rituals in an attempt to change unfavourable fate.

== Roles and tasks ==
Ašipu directed medical treatment at the Assyrian court, where they predicted the course of the disease from signs observed on the patient's body and offered incantations and other magic as well as the remedies indicated by diagnosis.

Ašipu visited sick people's houses and were tasked with predicting the patient's future (e.g. he will live or she will die) and also to fill in details about the symptoms that the patients may have disregarded or omitted. The purpose of the visit was to identify the divine sender of the illness based on the symptoms of a specific ailment.
