= Bullussa-rabi's Hymn to Gula =

Piece of Akkadian literature

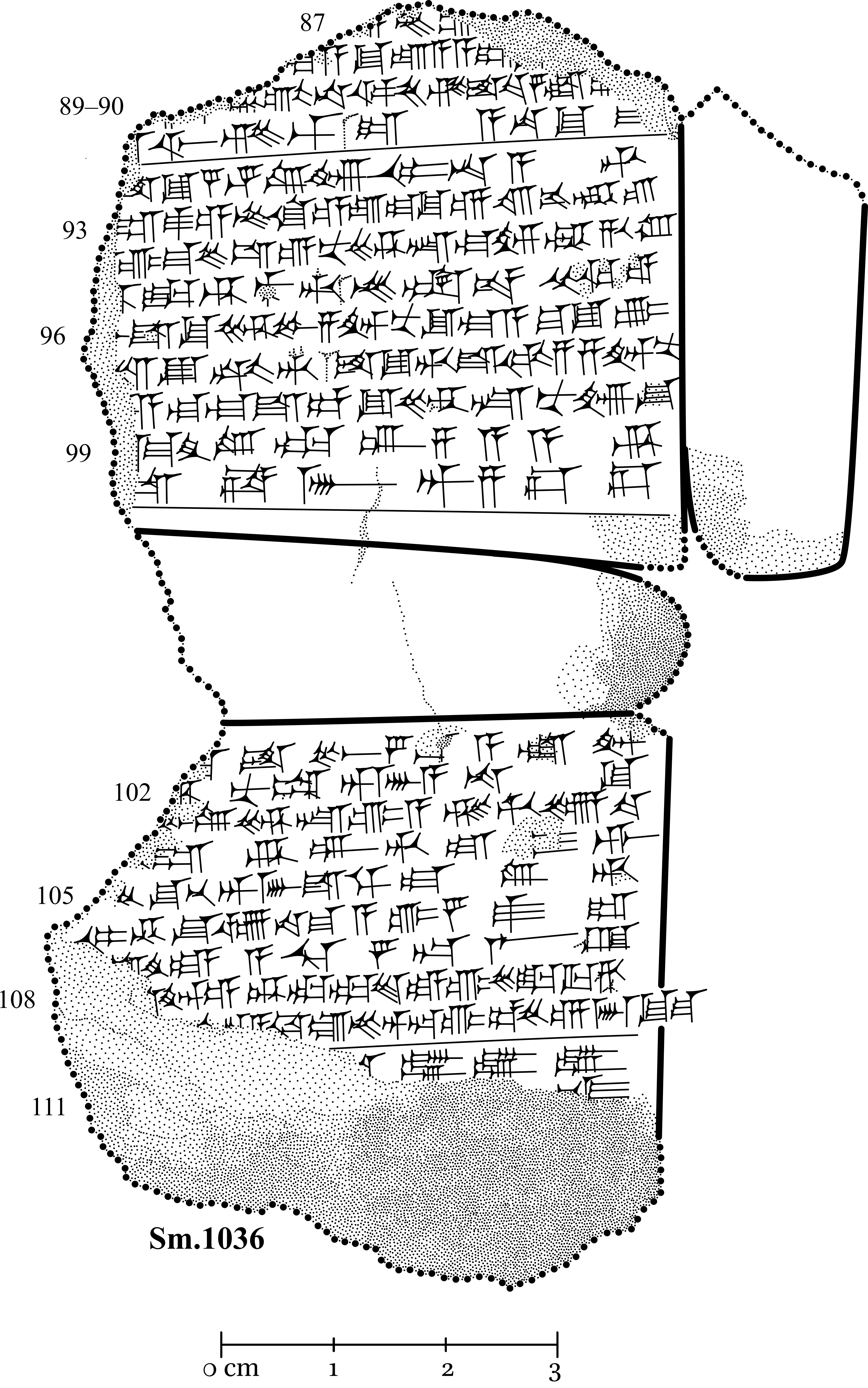
Copy of the cuneiform table with the Hymn to Gula

Bullussa-rabi's Hymn to Gula is a piece of Akkadian literature.
