= Ubartum =

21st-century BC Physician

Ubartum (fl. c. 2075 BC) was a female physician who lived in Garšana, a town in Mesopotamia. Ubartum came from an influential family. Both of her brothers - Šu-kabta and Nawir-ilum - were physicians, too, and one of them was married to a daughter of king Shulgi. Ubartum is known from about fifty cuneiform texts; eleven of them call her physician. The texts naming her are all of an economical nature. They mostly just provide the information that Ubartum received goods. They cover sixteen years.
