= Joan Goodnick Westenholz =

American-born archaeologist and Assyriologist (1943-2013)

- Born: 1 July 1943; Philadelphia, Pennsylvania
- Died: February 2013 (aged 69)
- Education: University of Pennsylvania; University of Chicago
- Occupations: Archaeologist and Assyriologist
- Known for: Bible Lands Museum

Joan Goodnick Westenholz (1 July 1943 – February 2013) was an Assyriologist and the chief curator at the Bible Lands Museum in Jerusalem. She held positions related to academic research at the Oriental Institute (University of Chicago), Harvard University, Ruhr University Bochum (Germany), New York University, Princeton University, and the W. F. Albright Institute of Archaeological Research at Jerusalem. She was one of the first people to research gender studies in relation to the Ancient Near East and she co-founded and edited the inter-disciplinary NIN – Journal of Gender Studies in Antiquity.

== Early life and education ==
Westenholz was born in 1943 in Philadelphia and attended the University of Pennsylvania, where she graduated at the age of 21 with a degree in anthropology. She completed her PhD in Near Eastern Languages and Literatures from the University of Chicago in 1971 and studied under Erica Reiner, A. Leo Oppenheim, I. J. Gelb, and Miguel Civil.

In 1988, Westenholz was named the chief curator of the Bible Lands Museum in Jerusalem and she remained there for two decades. There, she collaborated with Elie Borowski, the founder of the museum, and together they crafted, designed and curated many exhibits and galleries at the museum. For her work there, she attracted attention and recognition from the Israeli Ministry of Culture, which chose her for the Curators Prize in 2006 in honor of her "contributions in understanding the history of the people of Israel against the background of the cultures of the ancient Near East. This was the first time the Curators Prize was given to a curator of ancient art and archaeology."

She died in February 2013 at 69 years of age.

One obituary praised her work: "A prolific scholar, Dr. Goodnick Westenholz published extensively on religion, literary traditions and gender issues in the ancient Near East. She was an authoritative voice on a wide range of subjects, from the epic literature of the Sargonic kings of Akkad to temple structures in Mesopotamia, and from gendered divinities and rituals to the Assyrian lexicon."
