= Alalngar =

Mythological second king of Sumer

Alalngar 𒀉𒋭𒃻
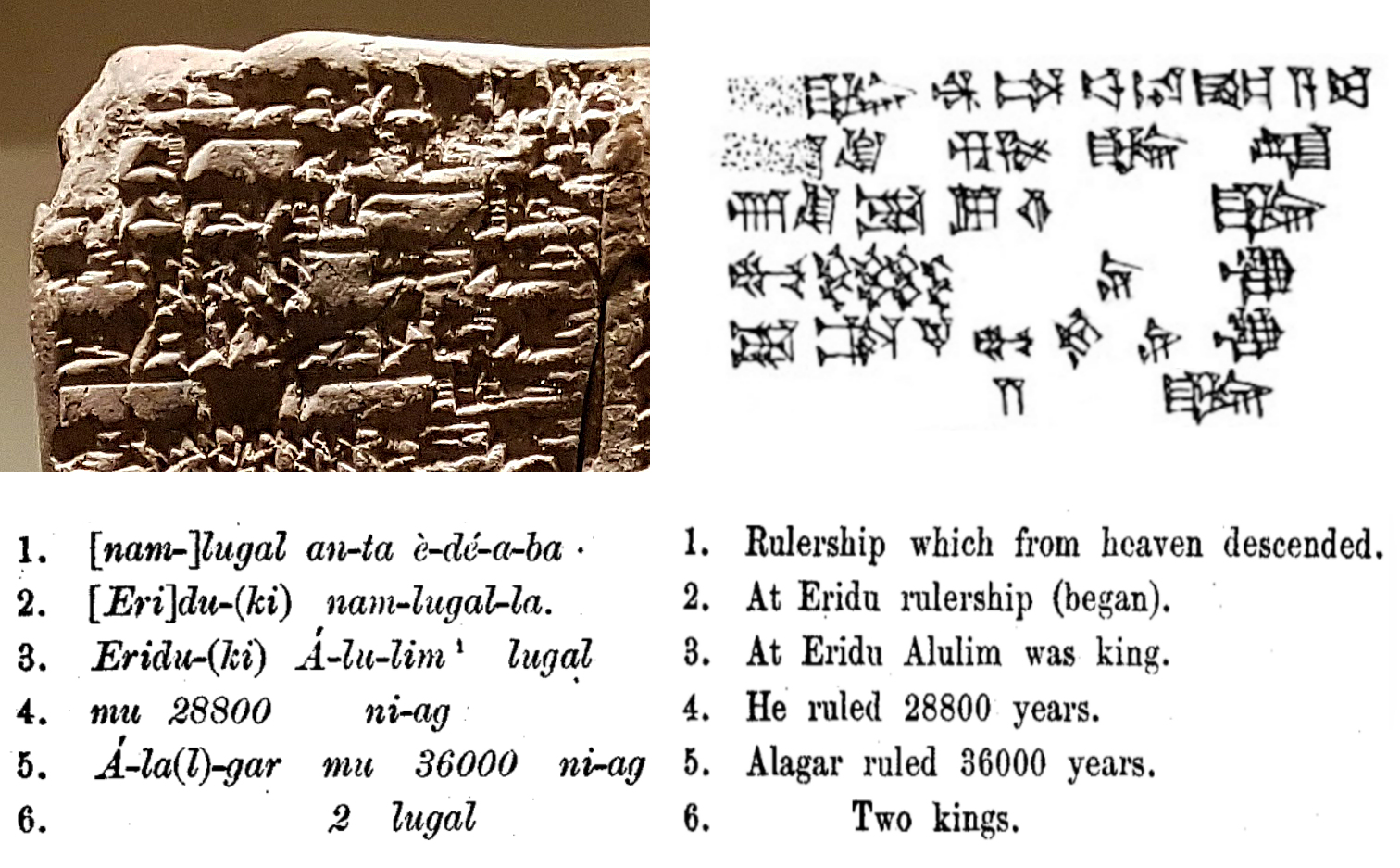
- From the Weld-Blundell Prism (W-B 444) copy of the Sumerian King List (SKL): the initial paragraph about the kingship of Alulim and Alalngar in Eridu over Sumer for a total of 64,800 years

High King of Sumer
- Reign: c. 2866 – c. 2856 BC
- Successor: Possibly En-men-lu-ana

King of Eridu
- Reign: c. 2866 – c. 2856 BC
- Successor: Possibly Amelon (According to Babyloniaca by Berossus)
- Born: Eridu
Era name and dates
- Early Dynastic (ED) I period: c. 2900 – c. 2700 BC (Middle Chronology)
- Dynasty: Dynasty of Eridu
- Religion: Sumerian religion

Alalngar (Note: Sumerian: 𒀉𒋭𒃻, romanized: Alalĝar; transliterated: a_{2}.lal_{3}.ŋar; anglicized: Alalngar; also: Alalgar; alternatively: Alaljar) was the second king (Note: Sumerian: 𒈗, romanized: lúgal, lit. 'great man'; transliterated: lú.gal; anglicized: lugal) to exercise the kingship of Eridu over all of Sumer—according to the Sumerian King List (SKL). He may have ruled c. 2866 – c. 2856 BC; however, the Weld-Blundell Prism (W-B 444) copy of the SKL states that he reigned for 10 sars (or 36,000 years) while the W-B 62 copy states that he reigned for 20 sars (or 72,000 years). According to the Dynastic Chronicle (ABC 18), W-B 444, W-B 62 copies of the SKL: he was preceded by Alulim and succeeded by En-men-lu-ana of Bad-tibira. The Uruk List of Kings and Sages (ULKS) copy of the SKL pairs seven antediluvian kings each with his own apkallu; and, the second apkallu (Uanduga) was paired up with Alalngar. (Note: An apkallu was a sage in Sumerian religion and/or literature.)

"After the kingship (Note: Sumerian: 𒉆𒈗, romanized: nam-lúgal, lit. 'fate of kings'; transliterated: nam.lú.gal; anglicized: namlugal) descended from heaven, the kingship was in Eridu. In Eridu, Alulim became king he ruled for 28,800 years. Alalngar ruled for 36,000 years. 2 kings; they ruled for 64,800 years. Then Eridu fell and the kingship was taken to Bad-tibira. In Bad-tibira, En-men-lu-ana ruled for 43,200 years. En-men-gal-ana ruled for 28,800 years. Dumuzid, the shepherd, ruled for 36,000 years. 3 kings; they ruled for 108,000 years. Then Bad-tibira fell and the kingship was taken to Larak. In Larak, En-sipad-zid-ana ruled for 28,800 years. 1 king; he ruled for 28,800 years. Then Larak fell and the kingship was taken to Sippar. In Sippar, En-men-dur-ana became king; he ruled for 21,000 years. 1 king; he ruled for 21,000 years. Then Sippar fell and the kingship was taken to Shuruppak. In Shuruppak, Ubara-Tutu became king; he ruled for 18,600 years. 1 king; he ruled for 18,600 years. In 5 cities 8 kings; they ruled for 241,200 years. Then the flood swept over."

— SKL

== See also ==
- Mesopotamia
- Ancient Near East

Preceded by	High King of Sumer c. 2866 – c. 2856 BC	Succeeded by Possibly En-men-lu-ana
Preceded by	King of Eridu c. 2866 – c. 2856 BC	Succeeded by Possibly Amelon
