= Adapa =

Mesopotamian mythical figure

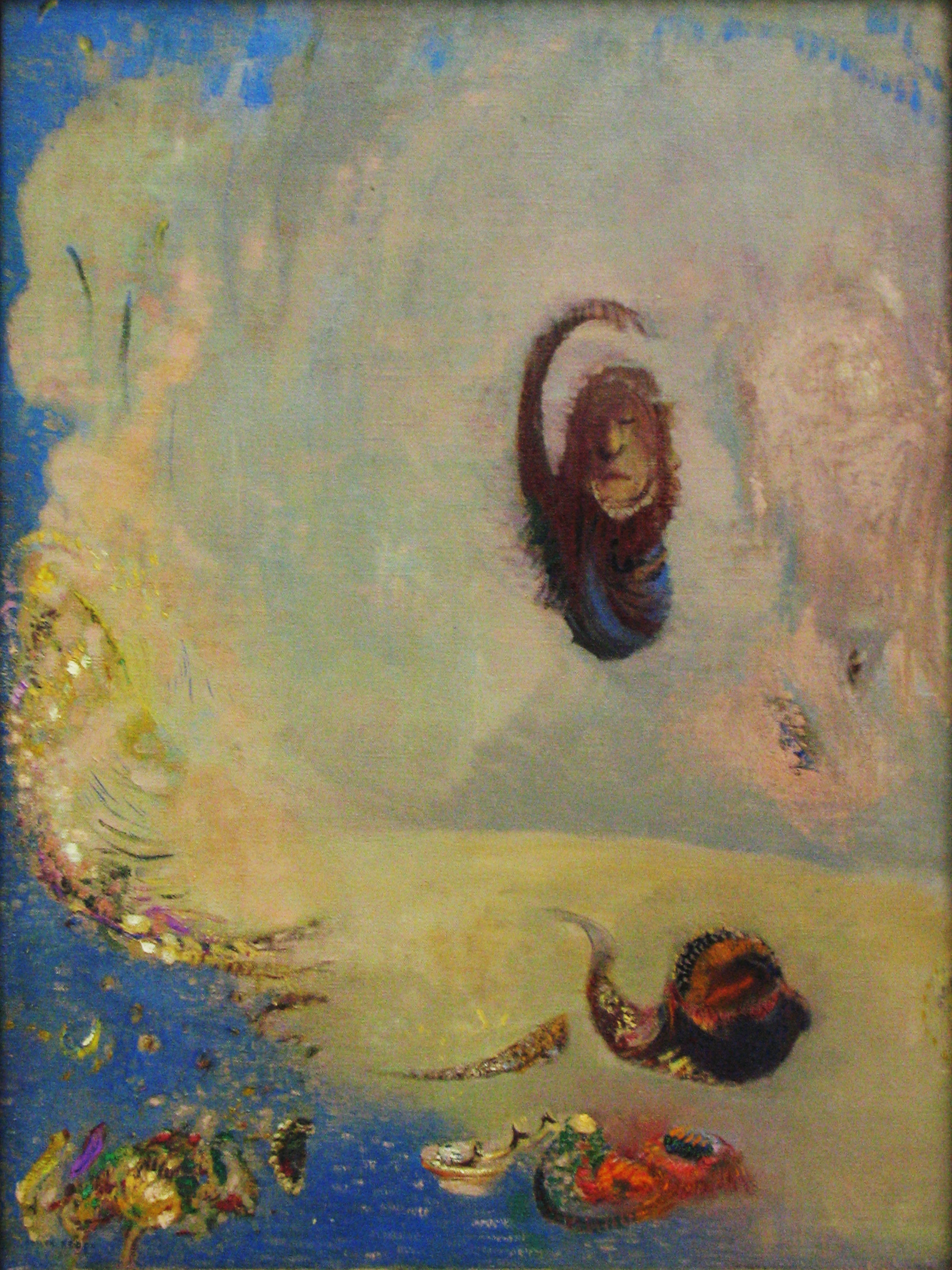
Oannès – Adapa from Odilon Redon in the Kröller-Müller Museum

Adapa was a Mesopotamian mythical figure who unknowingly refused the gift of immortality. The story, commonly known as "Adapa and the South Wind", is known from fragmentary tablets from Tell el-Amarna in Egypt (around 14th century BC) and from finds from the Library of Ashurbanipal, Assyria (around 7th century BC). The oldest tradition about him is from Me-Turan/Tell Haddad tablets (around 19th–16th century BC), which is written in Sumerian.

Adapa was an important figure in Mesopotamian religion. His name would be used to invoke power in exorcism rituals. He also became an archetype for a wise ruler. In that context, his name would be invoked to evoke favorable comparisons.

Some scholars conflate Adapa and the Apkallu known as Uanna. There is some evidence for that connection, but the name "adapa" may have also been used as an epithet, meaning "wise".

== Overview ==
Adapa's story was initially known from a find at Amarna in Egypt from the archives of Egyptian King Amenophis IV (1377–1361 BC). By 1912, three finds from the Library of Ashurbanipal (668–626 BC) had been interpreted and found to contain parts of the story. As of 2001 five fragments from the library are known. There are differences in several of the known versions of the text.

Based on a catalogue of texts, a possible original title, an incipit, may have been Adapa into heaven.

A modern analysis of the development of the main Adapa tale is by Milstein (2016).

=== Summary ===
Summary based on translations in Rogers (1912), Izre'el (2001), Pritchard (1969), Antoine (2014)

After the flood, although the kingship was in Kish, humanity was without guidance and had no direction, and this led to the rise of Adapa. Adapa was a mortal man, a sage or priest of the temple of Ea in the city of Eridu. Ea (sometimes considered his father) had given Adapa the gift of great wisdom but not eternal life.

While carrying out his duties, he was fishing at the river Tigris. The sea became rough by the strong wind, and his boat was capsized. Angry, Adapa "broke the wings of the south wind" preventing it from blowing for seven days. The god Anu called Adapa to account for his action, but Ea aided him by instructing Adapa to gain the sympathy of Dumuzid and Gishzida, who guard the gates of heaven and not to eat or drink there, as such food might kill him. When offered garments and oil, he should put the clothes on and anoint himself.

Adapa puts on mourning garments, tells Dumuzid and Gishzida that he is in mourning because they have disappeared from the land. Adapa is then offered the "food of life" and "water of life" but will not eat or drink. Then garments and oil are offered, and he does what he had been told. He is brought before Anu, who asks why he will not eat or drink. Adapa replies that Ea told him not to. Anu laughs at Ea's actions, and passes judgment on Adapa by asking rhetorically, "What ill has he [Adapa] brought on mankind?" He adds that men will suffer disease as a consequence, which Ninkarrak may allay. Adapa is then sent back down to earth. The ending of the text is missing.

=== Other myths ===
Adapa is also associated with the king Enmerkar (the known text is very fragmentary). In the portions that are known, Adapa and Enmerkar descend into the earth (nine cubits down), and are involved in breaking into an ancient tomb. What happens in there is not clear, but the outcome is that they leave and reseal the tomb.

=== Legacy ===
The name of Adapa became pervasive in some rituals of the Mesopotamian religion. According to Sanders (2017) exorcists would state "I am Adapa!" in their rituals. Rituals from Nippur dating to as early as around 1800 BC use Adapa's name in their incantations. Derivatives of the text remained in use until at least the 1st century AD.

During the Neo-Assyrian period, comparisons to Adapa would be used in reference to the king and so were used to legitimize that king. For example, it was written in Sennacherib's Annals, "Ea [..] endowed me with vast knowledge equivalent to that of the Sage Adapa".

== Interpretation ==
=== As Uanna/Oannes ===
The name Adapa has also been used for the first Apkallu, sometimes known as Uanna (in the Greek work by Berossus called Oannes). The accounts of the two are different, and (Uanna) the Apkallu is half-fish, while Adapa is a fisherman. However, there may be a connection. One potential explanation for the occurrence of the two names together is that the cuneiform for 'adapa' was also used as an appellative for "wise" (the Apkallu being wisdom giving beings).

Alternative viewpoints exist as to whether 'adapa' should be considered an epithet for 'uanna' or the other way around. Both occur together in compound as the name of the first Apkallu.

If identified as the first Apkallu, Adapa would have been the adviser of the mythical first (antediluvian) king of Eridu, Alulim. That connection is found in some texts, with King Alulu (Ref STT 176+185, lines 14–15). Elsewhere, he is associated with the much-later King Enmerkar. Indeed, earlier Sumerian record, Me-Turan/Tell Haddad tablet, describes Adapa as postdiluvian ruler of Eridu.

=== As Adam ===
When the story of Adapa was first rediscovered, some scholars saw a resemblance with the story of the biblical Adam, such as Albert Tobias Clay. Later scholars such as Alexander Heidel ("The Adapa legend and the Biblical story (of Adam) are fundamentally as far apart as antipodes") rejected this connection; however, potential connections are still (1981) considered worthy of analysis. Possible parallels and connections include similarity in names, including the possible connection of both to the same word root; both accounts include a test involving the eating of purportedly deadly food; and both are summoned before a god to answer for their transgressions.
