= En-men-dur-ana =

Mythological seventh antediluvian king of Sumer

En-men-dur-ana 𒂗𒈨𒂗𒂉𒀭𒈾
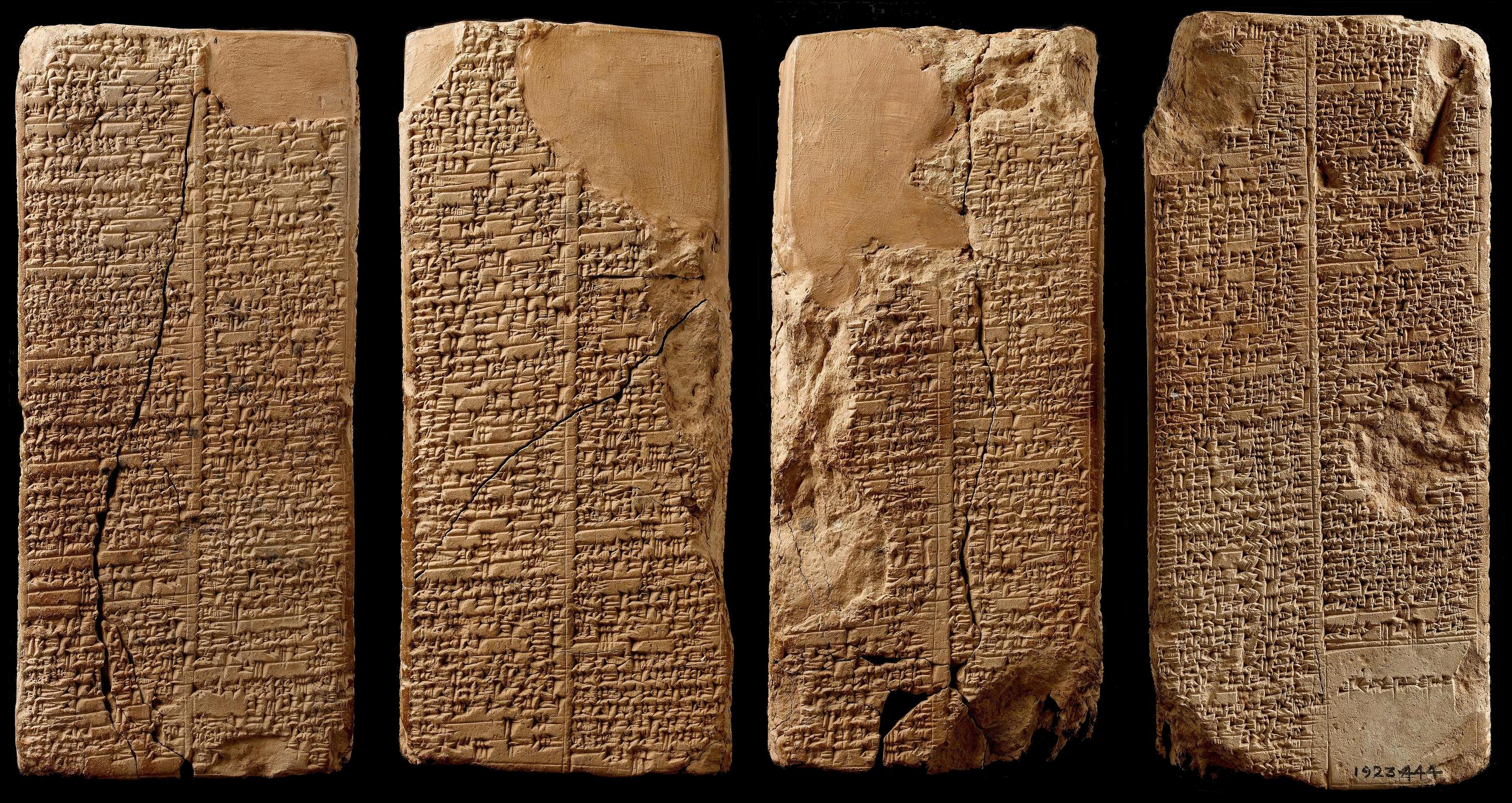
- The Weld-Blundell Prism is among the oldest, most well-preserved, and better-known versions of the Sumerian King List, and includes the inscription for En-men-dur-ana
- First appearance: Sumerian King List; c. 2000 BC

In-universe information
- Occupation: King of Sippar (reigned c. 21,000 years)
- Children: Ubara-Tutu

En-men-dur-ana (also En-men-dur-an-ki, Enmenduranki) of Zimbir (the city now known as Sippar) was an ancient Sumerian king, whose name appears in the Sumerian King List as the seventh pre-dynastic king of Sumer. He was also the topic of myth and legend, said to have reigned for around 21,000 years.

== Name ==
His name means "chief of the powers of Dur-an-ki", while "Dur-an-ki" in turn means "the meeting-place of heaven and earth" (literally "bond of above and below").

== City ==
En-men-dur-ana's city Sippar was associated with the worship of the sun-god Utu, later called Shamash in the Akkadian language. Sumerian and Babylonian literature attributed the founding of Sippar to Utu.

== Myth ==
The Akkadian text Pirišti Šamê u Erṣeti (Secret of Heaven and Earth) tells of Emmeduranki subsequently being taken to heaven by the gods Shamash and Adad, and taught the secrets of heaven and of earth. In particular, Emmeduranki was taught arts of divination, such as how to inspect oil on water and how to discern messages in the liver of animals and several other divine secrets.

== See also ==
- Apkallu
- History of Sumer
- Mesopotamian mythology

== Sources ==
- Ashmolean (2017). "Sumerian king list". Ashmolean Museum.
- Black, Jeremy Allen; Baines, John Robert; Dahl, Jacob L.; Van De Mieroop, Marc (2006) [c. 1900–1600 BC]. Cunningham, Graham; Ebeling, Jarle; Flückiger-Hawker, Esther; Robson, Eleanor; Taylor, Jon; Zólyomi, Gábor (eds.). "The Sumerian king list". Faculty of Oriental Studies. Electronic Text Corpus of Sumerian Literature (ETCSL) (in Sumerian). Translated by Jacobsen, Thorkild Peter Rudolph; Glassner, Jean-Jacques; Römer, Willem H. Ph.; Zólyomi, Gábor (revised ed.). United Kingdom of Great Britain and Northern Ireland: University of Oxford. "After the kingship descended from heaven, the kingship was in Eridug. In Eridug, Alulim became king; he ruled for 28800 years. Alaljar ruled for 36000 years. 2 kings; they ruled for 64800 years. Then Eridug fell and the kingship was taken to Bad-tibira. In Bad-tibira, En-men-lu-ana ruled for 43200 years. En-men-gal-ana ruled for 28800 years. Dumuzid, the shepherd, ruled for 36000 years. 3 kings; they ruled for 108000 years. Then Bad-tibira fell (?) and the kingship was taken to Larag. In Larag, En-sipad-zid-ana ruled for 28800 years. 1 king; he ruled for 28800 years. Then Larag fell (?) and the kingship was taken to Zimbir."

Preceded by En-sipad-zid-ana of Larak	7th King of Sumer legendary	Succeeded by Ubara-Tutu of Shuruppak
Unknown	Ensi of Sippar legendary	Unknown
