= Oannes =

Oannes may refer to:

- Oannes (bug), an insect genus in the tribe Coreini
- Oannes (mythology), Greek name for Uanna, an Apkallu in Mesopotamian myth
