= En-sipad-zid-ana =

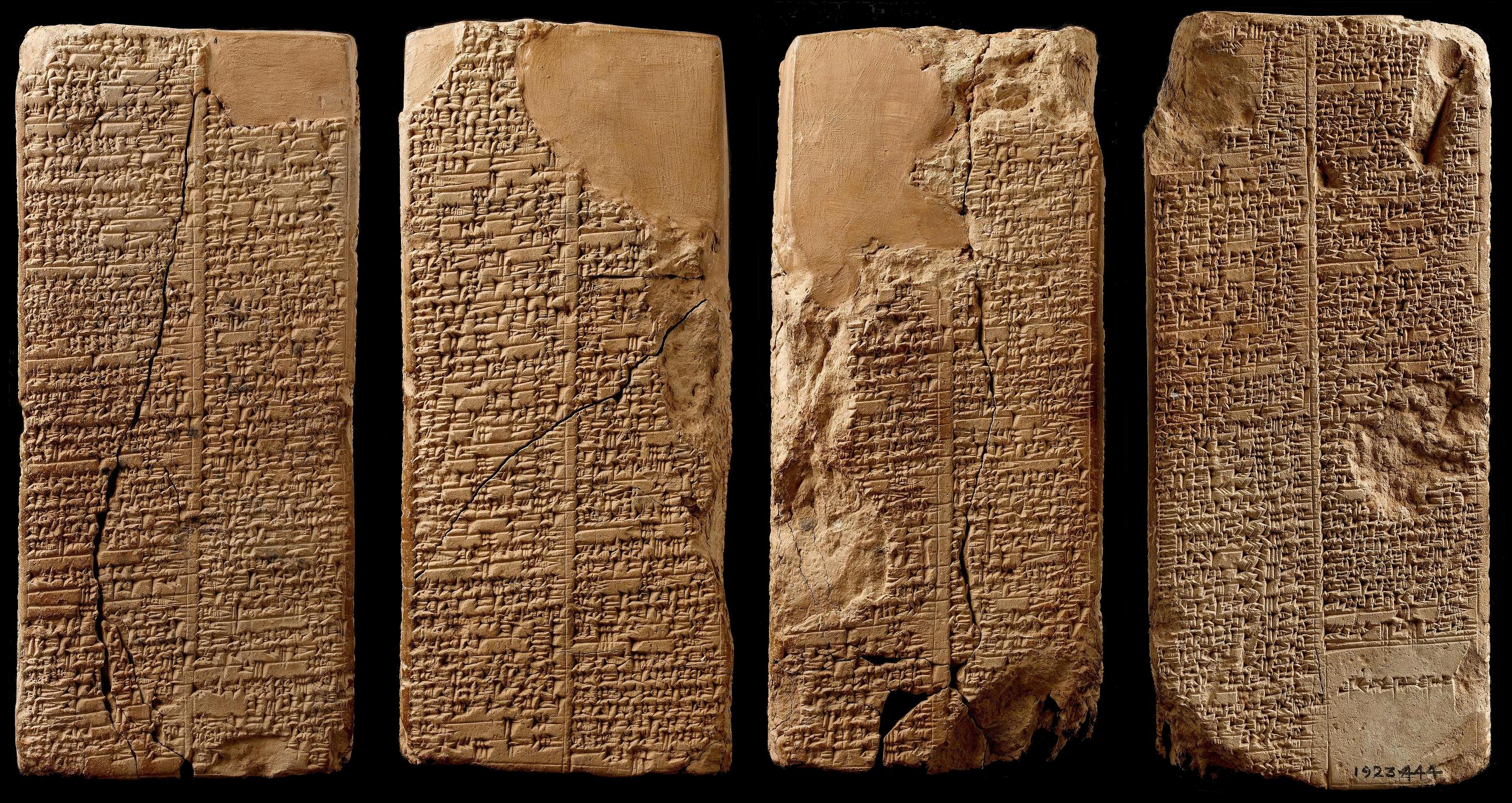
- The Weld-Blundell Prism is among the oldest, most well-preserved, and better-known versions of the Sumerian King List, and includes the inscription for En-men-gal-ana
- First appearance: Sumerian King List; c. 2000 BC

In-universe information
- Occupation: King of Larak (reigned c. 28,800 years)

En-sipad-zid-ana appears as the king of Larak in some versions of the Sumerian King List (SKL). According to that literary composition, En-sipad-zid-ana ruled for 28,800 years. The kings on the early part of the SKL are usually not considered historical, except when they are mentioned in Early Dynastic documents. En-sipad-zid-ana is not one of them.

== See also ==
- History of Sumer
- List of Mesopotamian dynasties

== Bibliography ==
- Ashmolean (2017). "Sumerian king list". Ashmolean Museum.
- Black, Jeremy Allen; Baines, John Robert; Dahl, Jacob L.; Van De Mieroop, Marc (2006) [c. 1900–1600 BC]. Cunningham, Graham; Ebeling, Jarle; Flückiger-Hawker, Esther; Robson, Eleanor; Taylor, Jon; Zólyomi, Gábor (eds.). "The Sumerian king list". Faculty of Oriental Studies. Electronic Text Corpus of Sumerian Literature (ETCSL) (in Sumerian). Translated by Jacobsen, Thorkild Peter Rudolph; Glassner, Jean-Jacques; Römer, Willem H. Ph.; Zólyomi, Gábor (revised ed.). United Kingdom of Great Britain and Northern Ireland: University of Oxford. "After the kingship descended from heaven, the kingship was in Eridug. In Eridug, Alulim became king; he ruled for 28800 years. Alaljar ruled for 36000 years. 2 kings; they ruled for 64800 years. Then Eridug fell and the kingship was taken to Bad-tibira. In Bad-tibira, En-men-lu-ana ruled for 43200 years. En-men-gal-ana ruled for 28800 years. Dumuzid, the shepherd, ruled for 36000 years. 3 kings; they ruled for 108000 years. Then Bad-tibira fell (?) and the kingship was taken to Larag. In Larag, En-sipad-zid-ana ruled for 28800 years. 1 king; he ruled for 28800 years. Then Larag fell (?) and the kingship was taken to Zimbir."
- Sjöberg, Åke Waldemar; Leichty, Erle; Tinney, Steve (2021) [2003]. "Pennsylvania Sumerian Dictionary Project". Pennsylvania Sumerian Dictionary Project (PSD).

Preceded by Dumuzid	6th King of Sumer legendary	Succeeded by En-men-dur-ana
