= Alulim =

Mythological first king of Sumer

Alulim 𒀉𒇻𒅆
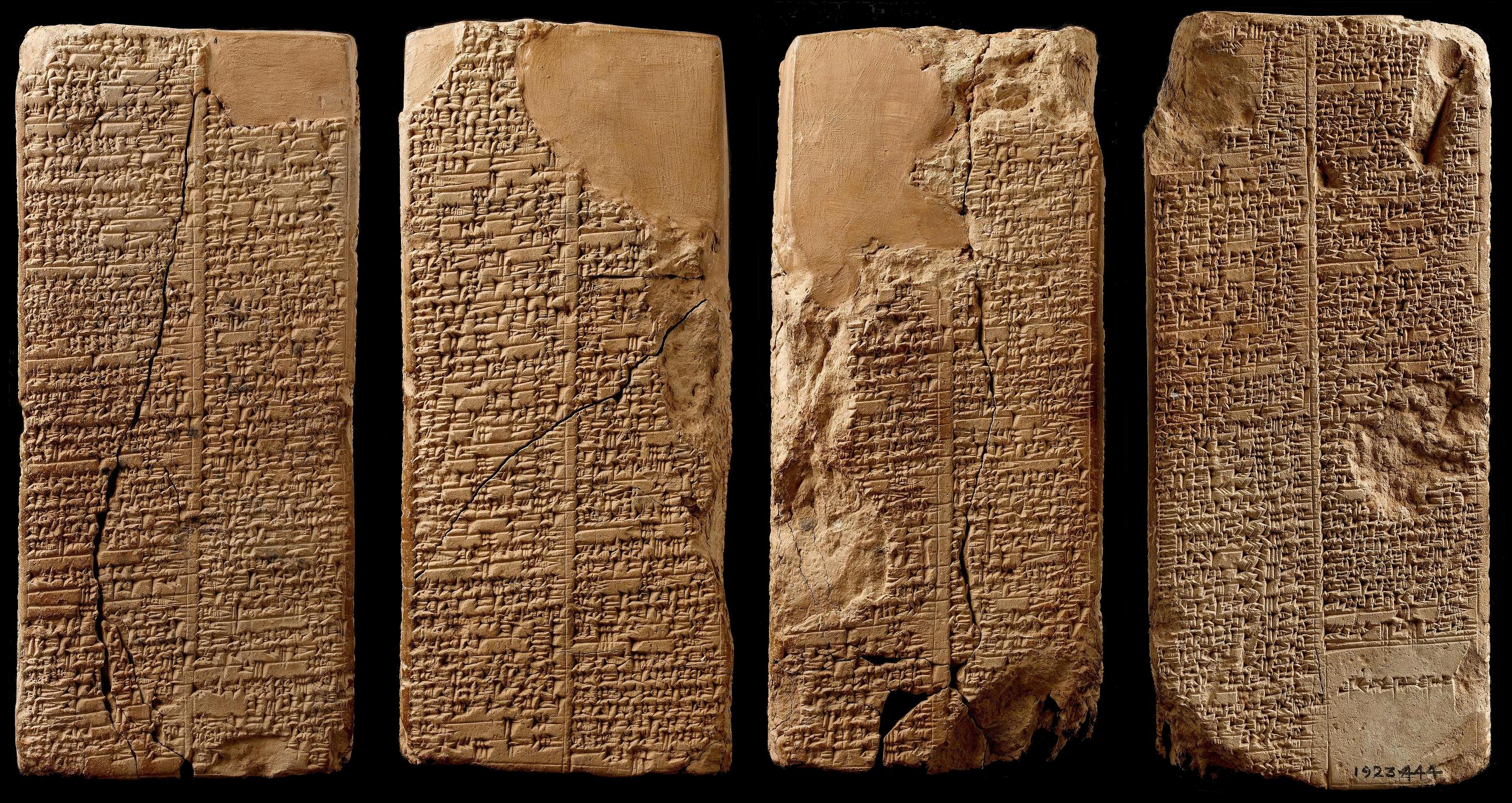
- The Weld-Blundell Prism, inscribed with the Sumerian King List, a text which mentions Alulim
- First appearance: Sumerian King List; c. 2000 BC

In-universe information
- Occupation: King (reigned c. 36,100 years)

Alulim (Sumerian: 𒀉𒇻𒅆, romanized: Álulim; transliterated: a₂.lu.lim) was a mythological Mesopotamian ruler, regarded as the first king ever to rule. He is known from the Sumerian King List, Ballad of Early Rulers, and other similar sources which invariably place him in Eridu and assign a reign to him lasting tens of thousands of years. The tablet of Old Babylonian period (c. 1900–1600 BC) from Ur describing the divine appointment of Alulim by the gods notes that he was chosen among "vast and many people," and appointed by gods for the "shepherdship of the entirety of the many people". Another myth describing his appointment by the gods and incantations treating him as the creator of insects are also known. He is absent from Early Dynastic sources, and he is considered fictional by Assyriologists. His name was preserved in later Greek, Arabic and Persian works.

== Name ==
Alulim's name was written in cuneiform as A_{2}-lu-lim or A-lu-lim and can be translated from Sumerian as either "horn of the red deer" or "seed of the red deer" depending on the variable first sign. Jeremiah Peterson suggests that it might reflect the Mesopotamian belief that at the dawn of history, when Alulim was believed to live, humans behaved in animal-like manner, as attested in texts such as Sheep and Grain or How Grain Came to Sumer. A further attested spelling, Alulu, written A-lu-lu, might represent an Akkadianized form. The name Ayalu, known from the Uruk List of Kings and Sages (Paired with Apkallu Adapa) where it is written A-a-lu, appears to be another variant, resulting from reinterpretation reliant on the partially homophonous word ayyalu, 'deer' or 'stag'.

The name Alulim is not attested in any Early Dynastic sources and was never used as an ordinary given name. The only indirect parallels are the occurrences of individuals named Alulu (with variable spelling) in early texts from Fara and other pre-Sargonic sites.

== Reign ==
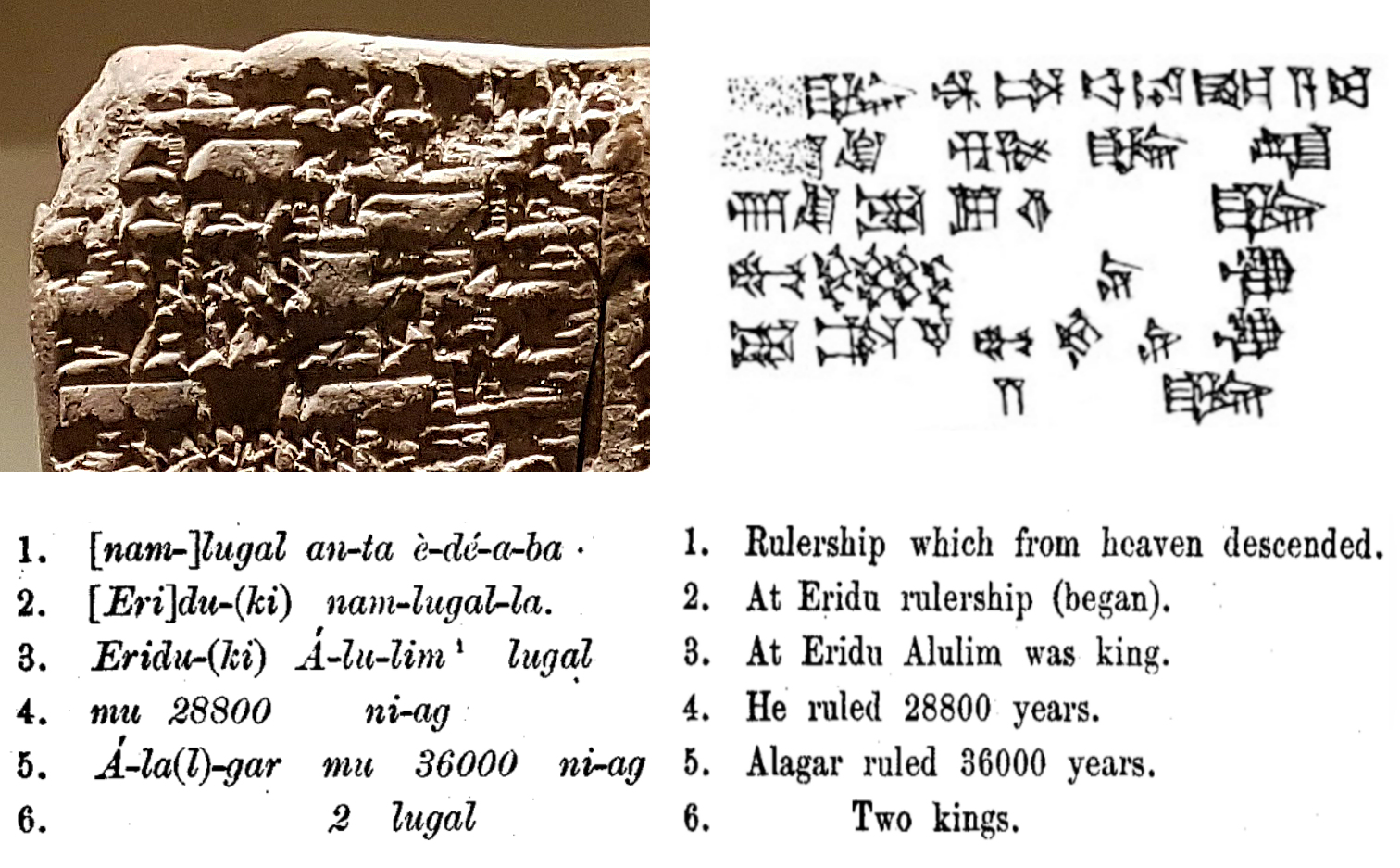
Weld-Blundell Prism, initial paragraph about rule of Alulim and Alalngar in Eridu for 64,800 years

Alulim is regarded as a fictional figure by Assyriologists. References to him are largely limited to lists of legendary ancient rulers. He was traditionally considered the first Mesopotamian king, and his reign was placed before the mythical great flood. All known sources listing primordial kings consistently state that he lived in Eridu, unless no mention of any cities is made. This tradition reflected the perception of Eridu as a city of particular symbolic importance. His reign was described as supernaturally long. Its duration was regarded as proverbial, as indicated by a letter of the astrologer Ašarēdu to an unspecified Babylonian king, in which he wished him to be blessed by the gods of Babylon with "years of Alulu". According to the Sumerian King List, Alulim retained his position for 28,800 years before he was succeeded by Alalngar, who in turn reigned for 36,000 years. However, the contents of the Sumerian King List are assumed to not reflect historical reality, and cannot be used to reconstruct early Mesopotamian chronology. There is no evidence that the figure of Alulim was incorporated into it from a preexisting older source. A different tradition about the length of his reign is preserved in the Ballad of Early Rulers, which states that he ruled for 36,000 years. According to Irving Finkel, other similar texts give further variant figures, such as 36,200 years (tablet BM 40565) or 67,200 years (tablet WB 62).

== Miscellaneous attestations ==
A tablet of the Eridu Genesis from Ur first published in 2018 describes the appointment of Alulim.

(Obverse)
1 They (the chief deities) created humanity
2 After the [animals/vermin?] were proliferating below/from the earth in unison
3 They made livestock and quadrupeds as fitting things in the steppe(eden-na)
4 In the high steppe ... joyous plants broadly
5 At that time, the canal was not dug ...
6 The dike and ditch [were not dredged(?) ...]
7 The ox ... the plow/farmer/furrow(?) ...
8 The lands ... a single track ...
9 Humanity ... their eyes/faces ... [rain?]
10 Šakkan/Šumugan [did not go out(?)] in the desert ...
11 Weaving the cap/headcloth(?) ...
12 Humanity ...
13 At that time, the snake was not present, [the scorpion was not present ...]
14 The lion was not present, [the hyena was not present ...]
15 The dog and wolf were not present ...
16 Humanity [had no opponent ...]
17 Fear and [gooseflesh(?) were not present ...]
18 ...
19 The king ...
20 ...

Translation:

(Reverse)
1 First ... were giving [Eridu or Ku’ara?] to Asalluhi,
2 Second ... were giving [Bad-tibira to the nugig midwife?],
3 Third ... were giving [Larak[ to Pabilsaĝ,
4 Fourth ... were giving [Sippar to Utu?]
5 Fifth ... were giving Š[uruppak?] to [Sud?].
6 Those cities .. their settlements ...
7 An, Enlil, [Enki?] and Ninhursaĝ
8 Among(?) those cities, Eridu .. they established at the front/as the leader(?)
9 They led(?) a man who was lying(?) among its vast and many people ...
10 An, Enlil, and Enki, the father(s) of the gods(?)
11 They chose Alulim/the "seed of the red deer" for the shepherdship of the entirety of the many people
12 They named him(!) Alulim/named the "seed of the red deer" ...
13 After they served according to the command to check thusly/forever after(?)
14 [So that?] humanity, whoever possessed a name, were grasping his feet (in submission)/following his path(?)
15 They put both (capital) offense and sin(?) in his hand
16 was giving ... to him
17 ...
18 ...

It has been interpreted as an etiology of the institution of kingship, with the first ruler being chosen from among mankind to act as the shepherd of the early, still animalistic humans, thus leading to the development of human civilization. The gods responsible for Alulim's appointment in this text are An, Enlil and Enki, who are also credited with assigning his name to him. Jeremiah Peterson notes that the grammar of the passage might not designate him as a human, which could indicate that in this context Alulim is not a personal name, but merely a description of the entity chosen to act as a ruler.

In the Ballad of Early Rulers, a composition noted for its large number of allusions to other works of Mesopotamian literature, Alulim is listed among famous ancient figures alongside Etana, Gilgamesh, Ziusudra, Humbaba, Enkidu, Bazi and Zizi. The fact that kings associated both with southern cities, such as Alulim, and ones at home in the north, such as Etana, are mentioned side by side might indicate that it was composed during the period of exodus of scribes from south to north in the Old Babylonian period. Bendt Alster compares this text to a drinking song and notes it appears to enumerate renowned legendary figures in seemingly humorous context, in order to explain the need to find joy in the present.

Alulim is also attested in Neo-Babylonian incantations against field pests, acknowledge him as a "king from before the deluge", though in this context he is also addressed as the creator of insects. He is described as capable of expelling them with a wand, and as responsible for the weeding of fields belonging to Nergal. Elsewhere the expulsion of insects is the domain of the deities Ninkilim and Ennugi, and it is not known how Alulim came to function as a similar figure. The same texts also state that he was believed to enjoy milk, ghee and beer, but could not stand "queen Nisaba", here a metonym for grain.

Although earlier tradition, Me-Turan/Tell-Haddad tablet, describes Adapa as postdiluvian ruler of Eridu, in late tradition, Adapa came to be viewed as Alulim's vizier. It was believed that he provided the king with wisdom on behalf of the god Ea. Piotr Steinkeller based on the connection between them suggests Alulim could himself be viewed as a sagacious Adapa-like figure, though he admits no sources provide information about the perception of his character in Mesopotamian tradition. The association between Alulim and Adapa is attested in lists of rulers and corresponding sages known from the Hellenistic period, and additionally in an earlier damaged text from Sultantepe labeled as a letter from Adapa to Alulim, following a convention of so-called "scribal letters". However, a distinct tradition instead placed Adapa in the times of another mythical king, Enmerkar.

== Proposed influence on other mythical figures ==
Eckhart Frahm has tentatively suggested that it is possible that the vowel pattern in the alternate form of Alulim's name, Alulu, influenced the formation of the name Pazuzu. A reference to Alulu occurs in a broken context in a heavily damaged Middle Assyrian (or later) text from Assur which might link him to Pazuzu, if the restoration of the latter name is correct, though due to the state of preservation the contents are presently impossible to interpret.

Mary R. Bachvarova notes that in the Hurrian Song of Birth, the primordial deity Alalu who appears as the original "king in heaven" (king of the gods) bears a name similar to Alulim's. She suggests that this text might have been influenced by the Sumerian King List, with the reigns of the early rulers of the gods being patterned on the traditions pertaining to early Mesopotamian legendary kings.

== Later relevance ==
A Greek version of Alulim's name, Aloros (Ancient Greek: Ἄλωρος), is known from citations from Berossus' Babyloniaca preserved in the works of authors such as Eusebius and Syncellus. Berossus' account of early kings depended on the tradition known from Sumerian King List. He states that Aloros reigned for 36000 years and was succeeded by Alaparos (Ancient Greek: αλαπαρος), presumed to be an adaptation of Alalgar. His writings were later partially euhemerized by Annianus, who combined his account with traditions pertaining to Enoch and with Genesis 6. His work was in turn an influence on the writings of the astrologer Abu Ma'shar al-Balkhi and on Al-Biruni's Qānūn, cited as sources in Minhaj-i Siraj Juzjani's Tabaqat-i Nasiri (written in 1259–1260), where a derivative of Aloros, Aylūrūs (Arabic: الوروس), is presented as the first king of the people standing in opposition to giants. Juzjani in his account equates him with Gayūmart.

Regnal titles
Preceded by None	King of Sumer (legendary)	Succeeded by Alalngar
Preceded by None	King of Eridu (legendary)	Succeeded by Alalngar
