= Alexander Heidel =

American assyriologist (1907–1955)

Historical portrait of Alexander Heidel

Alexander Heidel (1907–1955) was an Assyriologist and biblical scholar, and a Member of the Research Staff of the Oriental Institute of the University of Chicago.

== Life ==
Heidel was born in Argentina. He studied in Brazil and later at Concordia Seminary in St. Louis before receiving his PhD from the University of Chicago.

== Major publications ==
=== The Babylonian Genesis: The Story of Creation (1942) ===
"Babylonian Genesis" is a translation and commentary on the Babylonian epic known as Enuma Elish (the first two words of the text, translated as "When on high..."). On its publication it was reviewed in the Journal of the American Oriental Society as "a sober and lucid translation of the epic in the most completely restored form available to date." The University of Chicago Press published the first edition in 1942 and the second edition in 1951. The book remains in print.

The book consists of four chapters. Chapter 1 outlines the discovery of the Enuma Elish, its purpose, date, source and structure, followed by a literal translation; chapter 2 gives translations of the other Babylonian and Mesopotamian creation accounts as known at the time; chapter 3 treats the accounts of Babylonian creation stories preserved in Classical texts (Berossus and Damascius); and chapter 4 compares the Babylonian creation stories with those contained in Genesis.

Heidel aimed his book not at other Assyriologists but at biblical scholars and Christian ministers, and it should be regarded as a work of Christian apologetics rather than as a contribution to Heidel's own field of Assyriology. Many of his arguments stressing the uniqueness of the Genesis creation story have been overturned by later scholarship, but at the time of its publication the book was a milestone in introducing the wider public to the parallels between Mesopotamian and Hebrew mythology.

=== The Gilgamesh Epic and Old Testament Parallels (1946) ===
Heidel's book on the Gilgamesh flood myth is a comparison of the Mesopotamian epic with the biblical account of Noah's Ark and the biblical deluge. The University of Chicago Press published the first edition in 1946 and the second edition in 1949. The book remains in print.
