= Apkallu =

Seven demi-gods associated with human wisdom

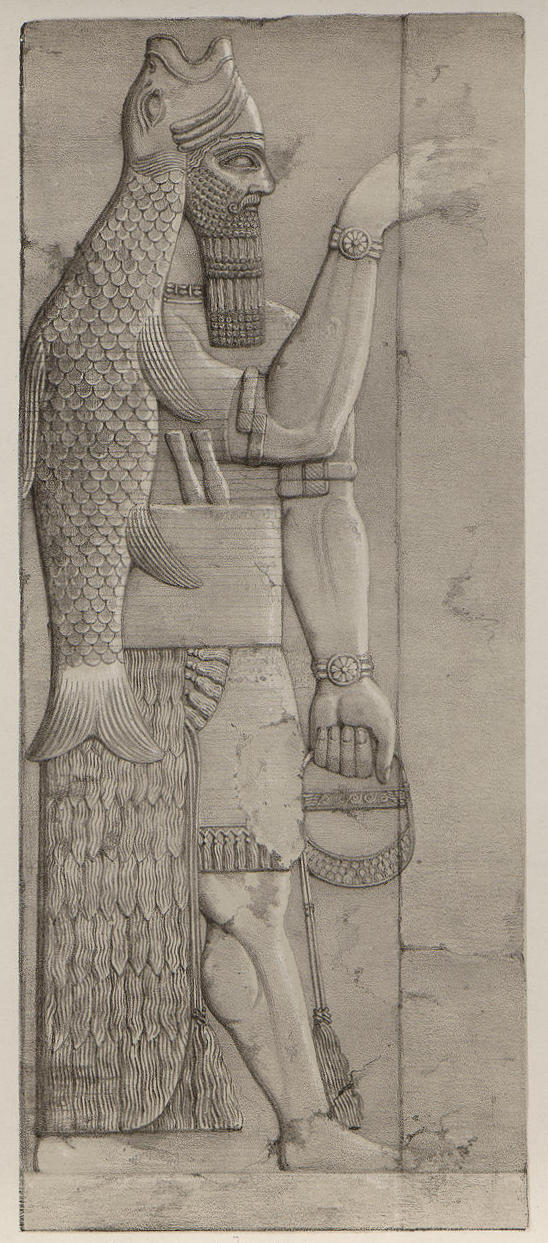
Bas-relief (probably) of an Apkallu figure from the temple of Ninurta at Nimrud.

Apkallu or and Abgal (𒉣𒈨; Akkadian and Sumerian, respectively) are terms found in cuneiform inscriptions that in general mean either "wise" or "sage".

In several contexts the Apkallu are seven demigods, sometimes described as part man and part fish or bird, associated with human wisdom; these creatures are often referred to in scholarly literature as the Seven Sages. Sometimes the sages are associated with a specific primeval king. After the Great Flood (see Epic of Gilgamesh), further sages and kings are listed. Post-deluge, the sages are considered human, and in some texts are distinguished by being referred to as Ummanu, not Apkallu. Another use of the term Apkallu is when referring to figurines used in apotropaic rituals; these figurines include fish-man hybrids representing the seven sages, but also include bird-headed and other figures. In a later work by Berossus describing Babylonia, the Apkallu appear again, also described as fish-men who are sent by the gods to impart knowledge to humans. In Berossus, the first one, Oannes (a variant of Uanna), is said to have taught humans the creation myth, the Enūma Eliš.

== Etymology, names, and meaning ==
The term apkallu has multiple uses, but usually refers to some form of wisdom; translations of the term generally equate to English language uses of the terms "the wise", "sage" or "expert". Additionally, the term is used when referring to human "priests" (also "exorcists", "diviners"). However, Mesopotamian human sages also used the term ummianu (ummânù) "expert".

As an epithet, prefix, or adjective it can mean "the wise"; it has been used as an epithet for the gods Ea and Marduk, simply interpreted as "wise one amongst gods" or similar forms. It has also been applied to Enlil, Ninurta, and Adad.

The term also refers to the "seven sages", especially the sage Adapa, and also to apotropaic figures, which are often figurines of the 'seven sages' themselves. A collation of the names and "titles" of theses seven sages in order can be given as:

Uanna, "who finished the plans for heaven and earth",
Uannedugga, "who was endowed with comprehensive intelligence",
Enmedugga, "who was allotted a good fate",
Enmegalamma, "who was born in a house",
Enmebulugga, "who grew up on pasture land",
An-Enlilda, "the conjurer of the city of Eridu",
Utuabzu, "who ascended to heaven".

=== Uanna (Oannes) or Adapa? ===
The first of these legendary fish-man sages is known as Oan/Oannes, Sumerian Uanna/U-An; on a few cuneiform inscriptions this first sage has "adapa" appended to his name. Borger notes, however, that it is difficult to believe that the half-man half-fish Adapa is the same as the fisherman of the Adapa myth, the son of the god Ea. A potential solution was given by W. G. Lambert—evidence that "adapa" was also used as an appellative meaning "wise".

Kvanvig 2011 considers the case for Adapa being one of or a name of one of the Apkallu. They note that while some texts contain plays on words between the terms "adapa" and "uan" and posit that "adapa" may be an epithet, though in the Adapa myth itself it is likely a proper name. In terms of the name of the first Apkallu they consider that both terms "adapa" ("wise") and "ummanu" ("craftsman") together form the whole proper name. Additionally, they note closer similarities between the 7th Apkallu Utuabzu, who is said to have ascended to heaven (in the Bit Meseri), and the myth of Adapa who also visited heaven. Both Adapa and the Apkallu have legends that place them halfway between the world of men and gods; but additionally just as Oannes in the Greek version passes all the knowledge of civilization to humans, so Adapa is described as having been "[made] perfect with broad understanding to reveal the plans of the land." However, despite some clear parallels between Adapa stories and both the first and last Apkallu, Kvanvig finally notes that the name used for the first Apkallu is given in both Berossus, and in the Uruk King list—that is Uan.

Oannes was once conjectured to be a form or another name of the ancient Babylonian god Ea. It is now thought that the name is the Greek form of the Babylonian Uanna, an Apkallu.

== Literary evidence ==
=== Uruk List of Kings and Sages ===
These Sages are found in the "Uruk List of Kings and Sages" (165 BC) discovered in 1959/60 in the Seleucid era temple of Anu in Bit Res; The text consisted of list of seven kings and their associated sages, followed by a note on the 'Deluge' (see Gilgamesh flood myth), followed by eight more king/sage pairs.

A tentative translation reads:

During the reign of Ayalu, the king, [Adapa]† was sage.

During the reign of Alalgar, the king, Uanduga was sage.

During the reign of Ameluana, the king, Enmeduga was sage.

During the reign of Amegalana, the king, Enmegalama was sage.

During the reign of Enmeusumgalana, the king, Enmebuluga was sage.

During the reign of Dumuzi, the shepherd, the king, Anenlilda was sage.

During the reign of Enmeduranki, the king, Utuabzu was sage.

After the flood, during the reign of Enmerkar, the king, Nungalpirigal was sage, whom Istar brought down from heaven to Eana. He made the bronze lyre [..] according to the technique of Ninagal. [..] The lyre was placed before Anu [..], the dwelling of (his) personal god.

During the reign of Gilgamesh, the king, Sin-leqi-unnini was scholar.

During the reign of Ibbi-Sin, the king, Kabti-ili-Marduk was scholar.

During the reign of Isbi-Erra, the king, Sidu, a.k.a. Enlil-ibni, was scholar.

During the reign of Abi-esuh, the king, Gimil-Gula and Taqis-Gula were the scholars.

During the reign of [...], the king, Esagil-kin-apli was scholar.

During the reign of Adad-apla-iddina, the king, Esagil-kin-ubba was scholar.

During the reign of Nebuchadnezzar, the king, Esagil-kin-ubba was scholar.

During the reign of Esarhaddon, the king, Aba-Enlil-dari was scholar, whom the Arameans call Ahiqar.

† Note the root for this word is the same (^{I}u_{4}-^{4+}60) as that for the following sage Uanduga (^{I}u_{4}-^{4+}60-du_{10}-ga) ie the translation to Adapa is interpretive, not literally 'phonetic'

— (Lenzi 2008, pp. 140–143)

Lenzi notes that the list is clearly intended to be taken in chronological order. It is an attempt to connect real (historic) kings directly to mythologic (divine) kingship and also does the same connecting those real king's sages (ummanu) with the demi-godly mythic seven sages (apkallu).

Though the list is taken to be chronological, the texts do not portray the Sages (nor the kings) as genealogically related to each other or their kings. There is some similarity between the sages' and kings' names in the list, but not enough to draw any solid conclusions.

=== Bit meseri ===
A list (similar to the Uruk list) of the seven sages followed by four human sages is also given in an apotropaic incantation the tablet series Bit meseri. The ritual involved hanging or placing statues of the sages on the walls of a house. A translation of the cuneiform was given by Borger:

Incantation. U-Anna, who accomplishes the plans of heaven and earth,

U-Anne-dugga, who is endowed with comprehensive understanding,

Enmedugga, for whom a good destiny has been decreed,

Enmegalamma, who was born in a house,

Enmebulugga, who grew up in pasture land,

An-Enlilda, the conjurer of the city of Eridu,

Utuabzu, who ascended to heaven,

the pure puradu-fishes, the puradu-fishes of the sea, the seven of them,

the seven sages, who have originated in the river, who control the plans of heaven and earth.

Nungalpiriggaldim, the wise (King) of Enmerkars, who had the goddess Innin/Ishtar descend from heaven into the sanctuary,

Piriggalnungal, who was born in Kish, who angered the god Ishkur/Adad in heaven, so that he allowed neither rain nor growth in the land for three years,

Piriggalabzu, who was born in Adab/Utab, who hung his seal on a "goat-fish"† and thereby angered the god Enki/Ea in the fresh water Sea, so that a fuller struck him dead with his own seal,

fourth Lu-Nanna, who was two-thirds a sage, who drove a dragon out of the temple E-Ninkiagnunna, the Innin/Ishtar Temple of (King) Schulgi,

(altogether) four Sages of human descent, whom Enki/Ea, the Lord, endowed with comprehensive understanding.

† Goatfish were associated with Enki/Ea

— Translated to English in Hess & Tsumura 1994, pp. 230–231, original german translation Borger 1974, p. 186

Borger found the Uruk and bit meseri lists to be in agreement.

=== The Twenty-One "Poultices" ===
Nudimmud became angry and summoned the seven sages of Eridu in high tones,

"Bring the document of my Anuship that it may be read before me,

That I may decree the destiny for Mu'ait,

The son who makes me happy, and grant him his desire."

They brought and read the tablet of destinies of the great gods,

He decreed the destiny for him and gave him ..

Anenlildam the purification priest of Eridu,

Made twenty-one "poultices" and gave them to him

— LKA 146 Obverse, Lines 5-12. (Lambert 1980, p. 79)

A text giving the story known as the Twenty-One "Poultices" (ref. no. LKA No.76) contains duplications of much of the Bit meseir text concerning the seven sages - it was analyzed by Reiner 1961. Another text from Uruk was later found that duplicated and further completed the coverage of Reiner's text.

In the twenty-one poultices text the seven sages (of Eridu) are entrusted with the reading "tablets of destiny." Additionally the sage Anenlilda is the maker of the 'twenty-one poultices' -- these items are then given to Nudimmud to bring to the "upper world" to gain merit.

=== The Poem of Erra ===
I made those ummanus [apkallus] go down to the apsu

and I said they were not to come back up

— Poem of Erra; Tablet 1, line 147.(Kvanvig 2011, pp. 161–2)

The seven sages are also mentioned in the Epic of Erra (aka 'Song of Erra', or 'Erra and Ishum'); here again they are referenced as paradu-Fish. In this text is described how after the Flood, Marduk banished them back to Abzu. Once the apkallu are banished, Marduk's phrasing becomes rhetorical (left):

Where are the seven apkallu of the apsu, the holy carp†,

who are perfect in lofty wisdom like Ea's their lord,

who can make my body holy?

† Usually translated as "pure puradu-fishes"

— Poem of Erra; Tablet 2, line 162 (Kvanvig 2011, p. 162)

Finally Erra persuades Marduk to leave his temple and fetch back the apkallu from their banishment, reassuring that he will keep order whilst Marduk is away. However, chaos breaks out; though some of the text is missing it seems that the subsequent outcome was that instead, earthly ummanus are given the task of cleansing Marduk's shrine. Kvanvig infers from this text that the mythological role of the apkallu was to aid the god (Marduk) in keeping creation stable by maintenance of Marduk's idol.

According to Scott B. Noegel this epic also contains several clever etymological wordplays on the names of apkallu, both textual and phonetic.

This text appears to have a completely different role for the apkallu from that given in the lists of sages and kings—essentially, Kvanvig proposes that the pre-deluge king-sage list was retroactively inserted onto a Sumerian king list, so to combine the historical record with the flood legend. In doing so it creates a pre-flood origin story for the Sumerian kings.

=== Building stories ===
The Seven Sages have enlarged it for you from the south to the uplands [north].

— (Temple hymn) The house of Asarluhi at Kuar-Eridu; line 193.

A Sumerian temple hymn states the seven sages (here as abgal) enlarged a temple.

The seven sages were also associated with the founding of the seven cities of Eridu, Ur, Nippur, Kullab, Kesh, Lagash, and Shuruppak; and in the Epic of Gilgamesh (Gilg. I 9; XI 305) they are credited with laying the foundations of Uruk.

=== Berossus' Babyloniaca ===
Berossus wrote a history of Babylon in around 281 BC, during the Hellenistic period. According to his own account, he was a Chaldean priest of Bel (Marduk). His Babyloniaca was written in Greek, probably for the Seleucid court of Antiochus I. His work gives a description of the wise men, their names, and their associated kings. Berossus' original book is now lost, but parts have survived via the abridgment and copying of historians including Alexander Polyhistor, Josephus, Abydenus, and Eusebius. Mayer Burstein suggests that Berossus' work was partly metaphorical, intended to convey wisdoms concerning the development of man—a nuance lost or uncommented on by later copyists.

What remains of Berossos' account via Apollodorus begins with a description on Babylonia, followed by the appearance of a learned fish-man creature named Oannes. Truncated account:

This is the history which Berossus has transmitted to us. He tells us that the first king was Alorus of Babylon, a Chaldaean; he reigned ten sari: and afterwards Alaparus, and Amelon who came from Pantibiblon: then Ammenon the Chaldaean, in whose time appeared the Musarus Oannes the Annedotus from the Erythraean sea. (But Alexander Polyhistor anticipating the event, has said that he appeared in the first year; but Apollodorus says that it was after forty sari; Abydenus, however, makes the second Annedotus appear after twenty-six sari.) Then succeeded Megalarus from the city of Pantibiblon; and he reigned eighteen sari: and after him Daonus the shepherd from Pantibiblon reigned ten sari; in his time (he says) appeared again from the Erythraean sea a fourth Annedotus, having the same form with those above, the shape of a fish blended with that of a man. Then reigned Euedoreschus from Pantibiblon, for the term of eighteen sari; in his days there appeared another personage from the Erythraean sea like the former, having the same complicated form between a fish and a man, whose name was Odacon. (All these, says Apollodorus, related particularly and circumstantially whatever Oannes had informed them of: concerning these Abydenus has made no mention.) Then reigned Amempsinus, a Chaldaean from Laranchae; and he being the eighth in order reigned ten sari. Then reigned Otiartes, a Chaldaean, from Laranchae; and he reigned eight sari. And upon the death of Otiartes, his son Xisuthrus reigned eighteen sari: in his time happened the great deluge. So that the sum of all the kings is ten; and the term which they collectively reigned an hundred and twenty sari.

— Berossus via Apollodorus recorded in Eusebius and Syncellus (translated from the Greek).

Truncated account via Abydenus:

So much concerning the wisdom of the Chaldeans.

It is said that the first king of the country was Alorus, who gave out a report that he was appointed by God to be the Shepherd of the people: he reigned ten sari: now a sarus is esteemed to be three thousand six hundred years; a neros six hundred; and a sossus sixty.

After him Alaparus reigned three sari: to him succeeded Amillarus from the city of Pantibiblon, who reigned thirteen sari; in his time a semidaemon called Annedotus, very like to Oannes, came up a second time from the sea: after him Ammenon reigned twelve sari, who was of the city of Pantibiblon: then Megalarus of the same place eighteen sari: then Daos, the shepherd, governed for the space of ten sari; he was of Pantibiblon; in his time four double-shaped personages came out of the sea to land, whose names were Euedocus, Eneugamus, Eneuboulus, and Anementus: after these things was Anodaphus, in the time of Euedoreschus. There were afterwards other kings, and last of all Sisithrus: so that in the whole, the number amounted to ten kings, and the term of their reigns to an hundred and twenty sari. [follows an account of a deluge]

[followed by an account essentially similar to that of Babel, followed by a war "between Chronus and Titan"]

— Berossus via Abydenus recorded in Eusebius and Syncellus (translated from the Greek).

Truncated account via Alexander Polyhistor:

[Background of Berossus, followed by an introduction to the accounts of Babylon, and a geographical description of it]

In the first year there made his appearance, from a part of the Erythraean sea which bordered upon Babylonia, an animal (...) who was called Oannes. (According to the account of Apollodorus) the whole body of the animal was like that of a fish, and had under a fish head another head, and also feet below, similar to those of a man, subjoined to the fish tail. His (...) language was (...) human; and a representation of him is preserved even to this day.

This being in the day-time used to converse with men; but took no food at that season; and he gave them an insight into letters and sciences, and every kind of art. He taught them to construct houses, to found temples, to compile laws, and explained to them the principles of geometrical knowledge. He made them distinguish the seeds of the earth, and shewed them how to collect fruits (...). From that time, so universal were his instructions, nothing has been added material by way of improvement. When the sun set, it was the custom of this being to plunge again into the sea, and abide all night in the deep; for he was amphibious.

After this there appeared other animals like Oannes, of whom Berossus promises to give an account when he comes to the history of the kings.

Moreover Oannes wrote concerning the generation of humans; of their different ways of life, and of their civil polity; and the following is the purport of what he said:

[follows a truncated account of what is essentially the enuma elis]

In the second book was the history of the ten kings of the Chaldeans, and the periods of each reign, which consisted collectively of an hundred and twenty sari, or four hundred and thirty-two thousand years; reaching to the time of the Deluge. For Alexander, as from the writings of the Chaldteans, enumerating the kings from the ninth Ardates to Xisuthrus,

[an account essentially the same as that of the Biblical Flood]

[Accounts then follow of Abraham, of Nabonasar, of the Destruction of the Jewish Temple, of Nebuchadnezzar, of the Chaldean Kings after Nebuchadnezzar, and of the Feast of Sacea]

— Berossus from Alexander Polyhistor recorded in Eusebius and Syncellus (translated from the Greek).

Summary
via Apollodorus		via Abydenus		via Polyhistor	
King	Fish-Man	King	Fish-Man	King	Fish-Man
Alorus		Alorus			An account of Oannes, and a claim he was followed by others similar
Alaparus		Alaparus			An account of Oannes, and a claim he was followed by others similar
Amelon		Amillarus	[2nd Fish-Man]		An account of Oannes, and a claim he was followed by others similar
Ammenon	Musarus Oannes	Ammenon			An account of Oannes, and a claim he was followed by others similar
Maglarus		Megalarus			An account of Oannes, and a claim he was followed by others similar
Daonus the Shepherd	[4th fish-man]	Daos the Shepherd	Euedocus, Eneugamus, Eneuboulus, and Anementus		An account of Oannes, and a claim he was followed by others similar
Euedoreschus	Odacon	Euedoreschus	Anadophus		An account of Oannes, and a claim he was followed by others similar
Amempsinus		[unnamed]			An account of Oannes, and a claim he was followed by others similar
Otiartes		[unnamed]		Ardates	An account of Oannes, and a claim he was followed by others similar
Xisuthrus	[deluge]	Sisithrus		Xisuthus	An account of Oannes, and a claim he was followed by others similar
All accounts give ten kings, followed by a deluge

In summary, Berossus' Babylonian history recounts ten kings before a deluge (followed by the reigns of later kings), with a record or myth of prehistoric man receiving civilization via the Oannes; it also contains a paraphrasing of the myth the Enuma Elis, which was said to have been recounted by the Oannes. Though Berossus' history contains obvious historical errors, parts of it have convincing matches with ancient cuneiform texts, suggest he was recreating accounts known from ancient Mesopotamian texts. Mayer Burstein considers that the text was not well written in a "Greek style", but was essentially a transliteration of Mesopotamian myths into Greek. Helpfully for future historians, Berossus does not seem to have altered the myths or narratives to suit a Greek audience.

In terms of his relevance to the Apkallu: his lists match fairly well with the Uruk King/Apkallu list, though there are differences and variations. Oannes is paired with the king Alorus, and by comparison can be considered equivalent to Adapa [Uanna]. Matches between Berossus and the kings and apkallu in the Uruk King List have been proposed.

=== Other references ===
Various other cuneiform texts have references to these seven sages. There are texts that associates a set of seven sages with the city Kuar-Eridu or Eridu, while in the Epic of Gilgamesh there is a reference to seven counselors as founders of Uruk. Another list of seven sages used in a ritual differs from the description and names give in the Bit meseri text.

Several of named apkulla are listed on inscriptions as authors, notably Lu-Nanna is recorded as author of the Myth of Etana.

== Depictions in ancient art ==
Representations of 'apkallu' were used in apotropaic rituals; in addition to fish-headed ones (similar to descriptions of the seven sages), other hybrids were used as 'apkallu' in this context (generally bird-headed humans).

Apkallu reliefs appear prominently in Neo-Assyrian palaces, notably the constructions of Ashurnasirpal II of the 9th century BC. They appear in one of three forms, bird-headed, human-headed or dressed in fish-skin cloaks. They have also been found on reliefs from the reign of Sennacherib. The form taken of a man covered with the 'pelt' of a fish is first seen the Kassite period, continuing is used to the period of Persian Babylonia – the form was popular during the Neo-Assyrian and Neo-Babylonian periods.

== Gallery ==
Probable depictions of Apkallu

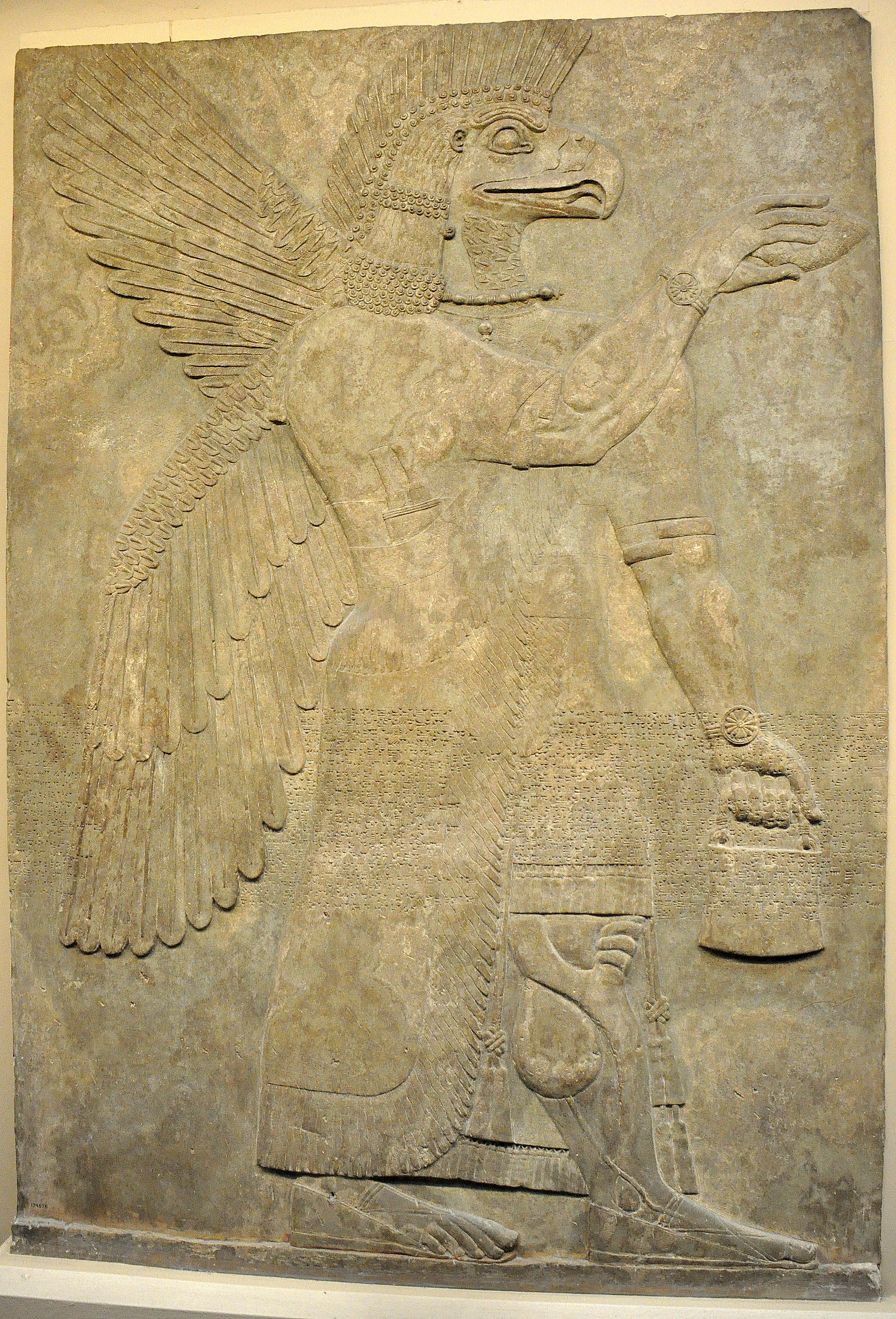
Wall relief depicting an eagle-headed and winged man, Apkallu, from Nimrud.

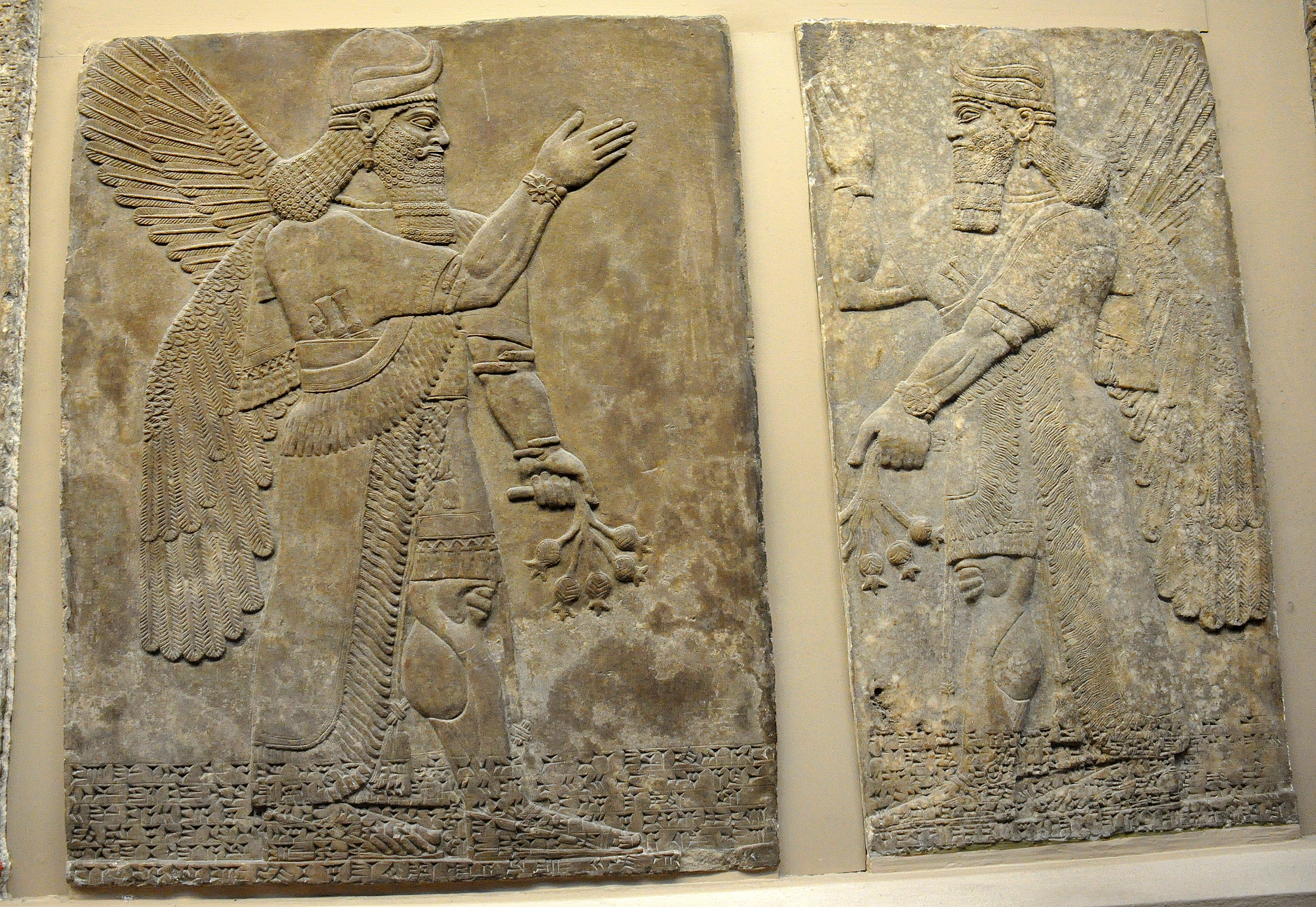
A pair of protective spirits, Apkallu, from Nimrud.

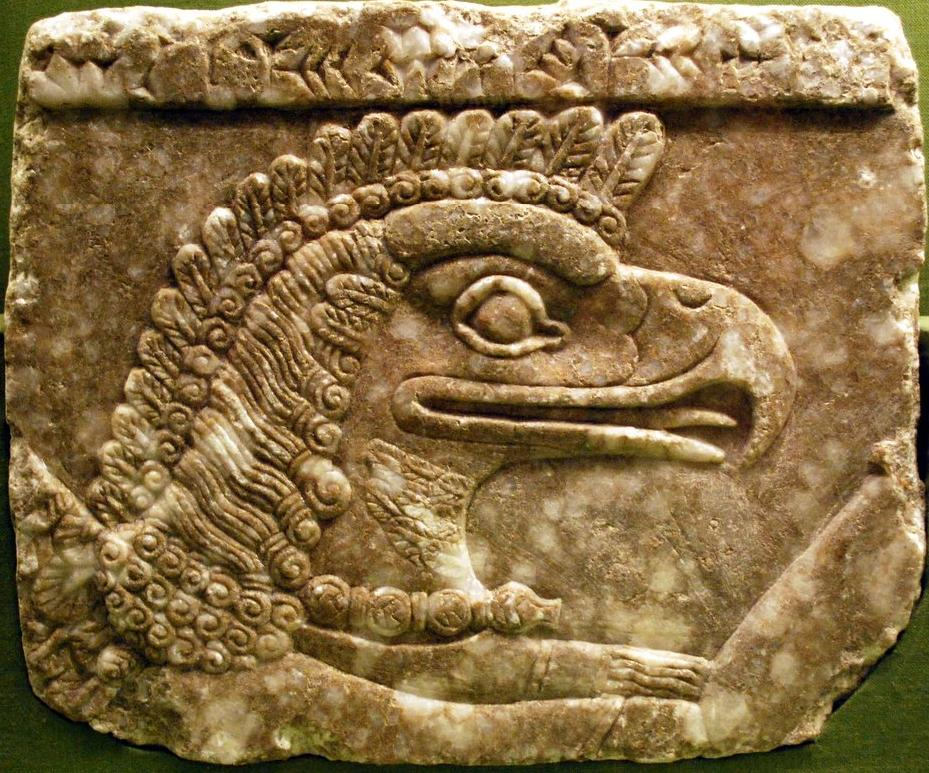
Nimrud Apkallu

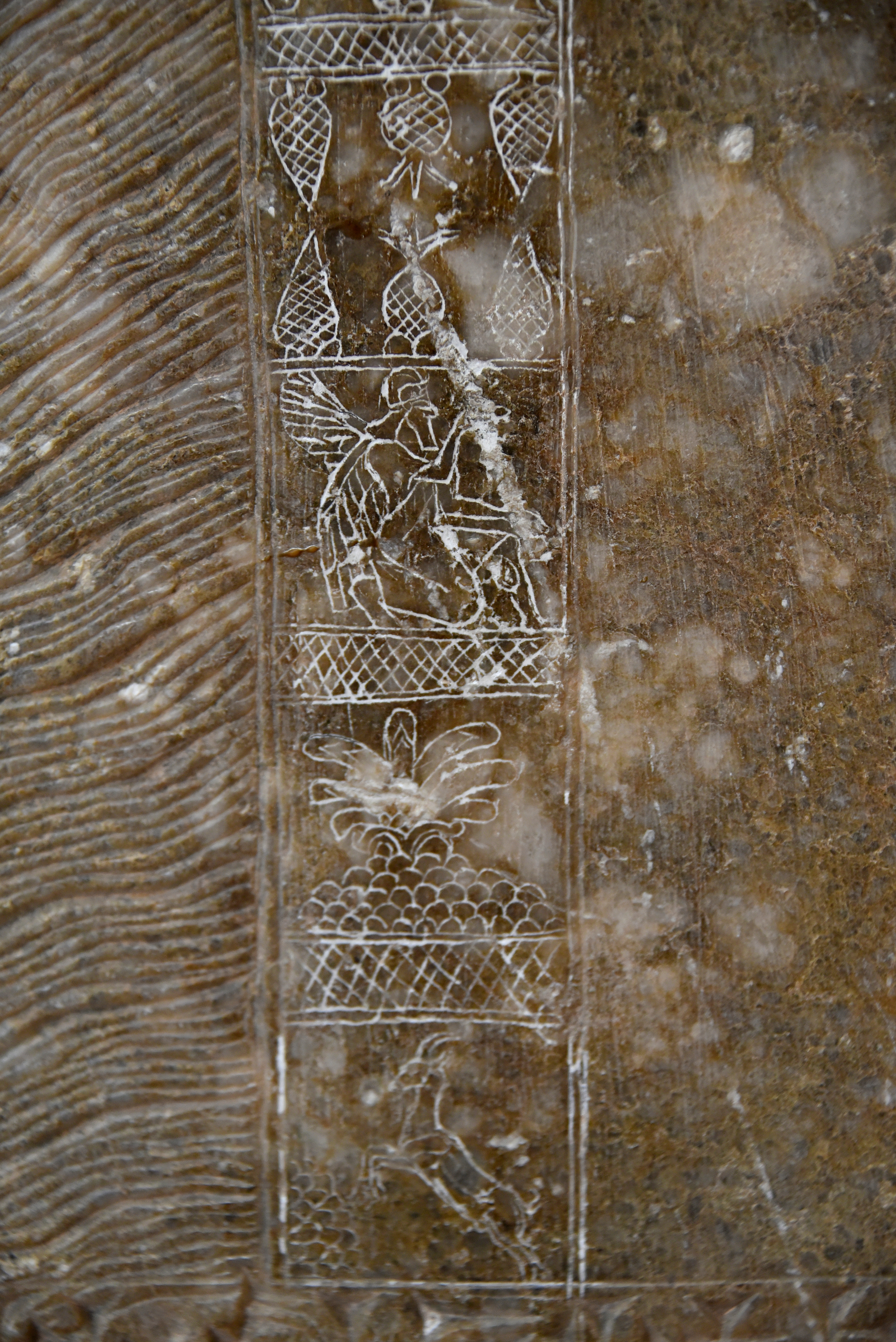
Detail of the embroidered dress of a male Apkallu, showing a kneeling winged Apkallu. From Nimrud, Iraq. 883-859 BC. Ancient Orient Museum, Istanbul

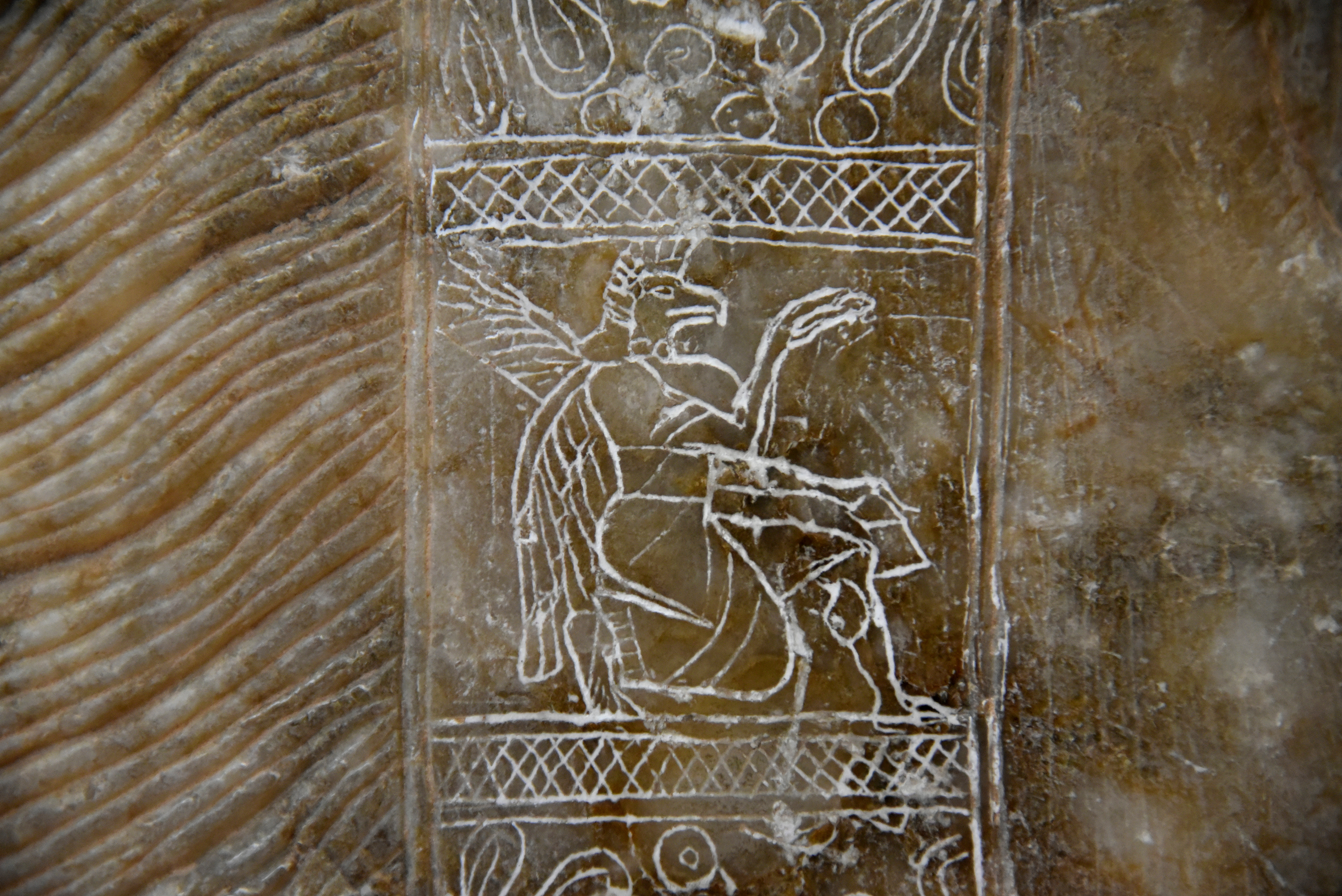
Detail of the embroidered dress of an Apkallu, showing a kneeling winged eagle-headed Apkallu. From Nimrud, Iraq. 883-859 BC. Ancient Orient Museum, Istanbul

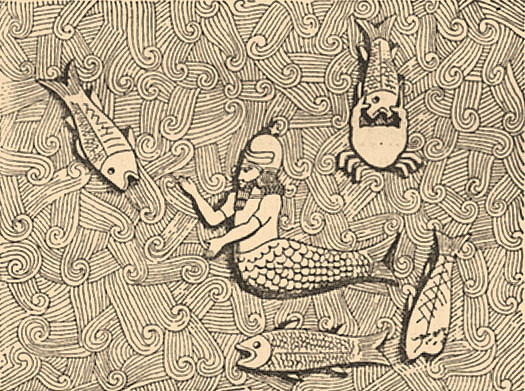
"Apkallu" relief from Khorsabad

== Possible Biblical influence ==
The spread of the 'seven sage' legend westwards during the 1st and 2nd millennia has been speculated to have led to the creation of the tale of the Nephilim (Genesis 6:1-4) as recounted in the Old Testament, and may have an echo in the text of the Book of Proverbs (Prov 9:1): "Wisdom built her house. She set out its seven pillars." The story of Enoch ("seventh from Adam") and his ascension to heaven has also been proposed to be a variant or influenced by the seventh apkallu Utuabzu who is also said to have ascended to heaven in the bit meseri.

== See also ==
- Atra-Hasis, meaning "very wise": in the eponymous legend he is the survivor of a deluge
- Ašipu, Mesopotamian vocation of scholar/doctor/magician, sometimes referred to as exorcists
- Dagon, Mesopotamian and Canaanite deity associated with clouds and fertility, sometimes mischaracterized as fish-like.
- Kulullû, a different type of Mesopotamian fish-human hybrid
- Saptarishi, seven sages of Vedic literature
- Sumerian king list
