= Bad-tibira =

Ancient sumerian city

- Tell Madineh
- Location within Iraq
- 31°22′47″N 45°59′59″E
- Type: settlement
- Periods: Early Dynastic, Ur III, Old Babylonian
- Location: Dhi Qar Governorate, Iraq

Site notes
- Condition: Ruined
- Owner: Public
- Public access: Yes

Bad-tibira (also Patibira) (Sumerian: 𒂦𒁾𒉄𒆠, bad_{3}-tibira^{ki}) was an ancient Sumerian city dating back to the Early Dynastic period, which appears among antediluvian cities in the Sumerian King List. In the earliest days of Akkadian language studies its name was mistakenly read as Dûr-gurgurri. Its location is believed to be at modern Tell al-Madineh (also Tell Madineh and Tell al-Mada’in), between Ash Shatrah and Tell as-Senkereh (ancient Larsa) and 25 km southwest of ancient Girsu in southern Iraq. This proposal is based on unprovenanced illegally excavated inscriptions which were said to have come from a mound called Medain 29 km northwest of Girsu, following a report of a vendor of one of the inscriptions, but excavations there had proved fruitless.

There is known to be a temple of the deity Kittum at Bad-tibira. Isar, a god of Mari is also said to have been worshiped there. It has been suggested that Ninsheshegarra, an aspect of the goddess Geshtinanna who is sister of Dumuzid, was worshiped in the temple Esheshegarra at Bad-tibira.

== Bad-tibira in Sumerian literature ==
According to the Sumerian King List, Bad-tibira was the second city to "exercise kingship" in Sumer before the flood, following Eridu. These kings were said to be En-men-lu-ana, En-men-gal-ana and Dumuzid the Shepherd.

The early Sumerian text Descent of Inanna into the Underworld mentions the city's temple, E-mush-kalamma (a temple to Lulal). In this tale, Inanna dissuades demons from the netherworld from taking Lulal, patron of Bad-tibira, who was living in squalor. They eventually take Dumuzid, who lived in palatial opulence at Uruk. This Dumuzid is called "the Shepherd", who on the King List resides at Bad-Tibira in contrast to the post-diluvian Dumuzid, the Fisherman, who reigns in Uruk.

One of the Temple Hymns of Enheduanna, the daughter of Sargon of Akkad (c. 2334-2279 BC), is dedicated to Bad-tibira and the E-mush (e_{2}.muš_{3}) temple of Dumuzid, consort of Inanna, there.

== History ==
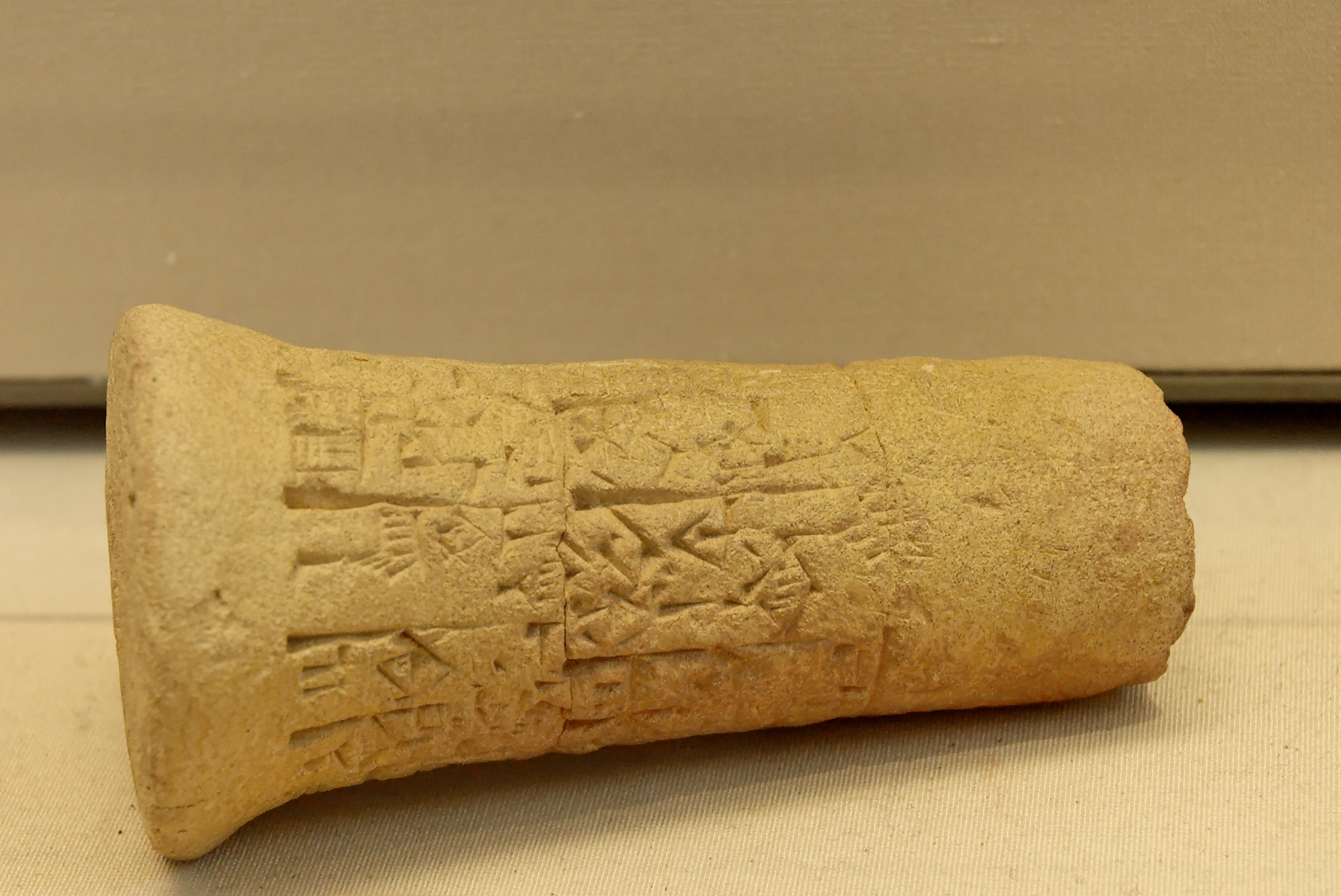
Foundation nail Entemena Louvre AO22934

A illegally excavated cone said to have been found at Tell al-Madineh marked the construction by Ur-Nammu (c. 2100 BC), a ruler of the Ur III empire, of the Iturungal canal.

"For the goddess Inanna, [la]dy of Eanna, his lady, Ur-Nammu, mighty man, king of Ur, king of the lands of Sumer and Akkad, dug for her the Iturungal canal, her beloved canal"

The "brotherhood text" in a cuneiform inscription on a illegally excavated cone said have been found at "Médaïn". A "Médaïn" northeast of Girsu was investigated and nothing was found there. Speculation on its findspot then shifted to Tell al-Madineh. The cone, of which there are many exemplars, records the friendship pact of Entemena, governor of Lagash, and Lugal-kinishedudu, governor of Uruk (deity Sul-MUS×PA = Shul-utula). to Inanna and Dumuzid, under his local epithet Lugal-E-mush.

"For the goddess Inanna and the god Lugal-emush, En-metena, ruler of Lagash, Built the E-mush (“House — Radiance [of the Land]”), their beloved temple, and ordered (these) clay nails(?) for them. En-metena, who built the E-mush temple — is personal god is the god Sul-MUS×PA. At that time En-metena, ruler of Lagash, and Lugal-kinishe-dudu, ruler of Uruk, established a brotherhood (pact) (between themselves)."

A foundation tablet of En-metena (c. 2400 BC) said to be from the Tell al-Madineh, with multiple exemplars, also mentioned the building of E-Mush "... At that time, En-metena built for Lugalemush, the E-mush (“House — Radiance [of the Land]”) of Pa-tibira, his beloved temple, restoring it. ...". Pa-tibira (pa5-ti-bir5-ra{ki}-ka) appear to be an alternate spelling of Bad-tibira.

An inscription of Enmetena states "... He cancelled obligations for the citizens of Uruk, Larsa and Patibira; he restored (the first) to Inana’s control at Uruk, he restored (the second) to Utu’s control at Larsa, he restored (the third) to Lugalemush’s control at the Emush".

On a text of Ur-gigir found at Ur it reads:

"Ur-gigira, ‘governor’ of Dumuzi, son of Ur-nigina, mighty man, king of Uruk, and Ama-lagar, his mother, for Nin-šeše-ĝara, his lady, E-šeše-ĝara, her beloved temple in Bad-tibira he built (for her)."

In the Isin-Larsa Period possession of the city passed between Larsa and Isin. Larsa ruler Sin-Iddinam (c. 1849-1843 BC) claimed, on a cone thought to be from the site, to have built the great wall of Bad-tibira "by means of his triumph he built in a grand fashion the great wall of Bad-tibira". Isin ruler Lipit-Ishtar (c. 1934-1924 BC), "the shepherd of Nippur", claimed to have built the "House of Righteousness" there. The city was under the control of Larsa during the long reign of Rim-Sîn I. During the reign of Rîm-Anum (18th century BC), a ruler of Uruk during the Old Babylonian period, a šagina-official of Bad₃-tibira is recorded as being received by military scribes at Uruk.

== Tell al-Madineh ==
Cities of Sumer

The site was visited in 1927 by Raymond P. Dougherty for a day. He reported that the site covered about a square mile with the western mound being the largest with low extensions bearing off a mile to the north. Straight and circular walls were noted. Numbers of baked bricks were seen along with door sockets, flint saw blades, and a bronze needle. Some badly effaced half-bricks on the surface of the mound bore the inscription of Amar-Sin, of the Third Dynasty of Ur. Pieces of vitrified brick scattered over the surface of the large mound bore witness to the city's destruction by fire. No building remains were noted

In 1965 Vaughn E. Crawford of the Metropolitan Museum of Art visited the site, noting that surface pottery indicated occupation until about 1500 BC. No building remains were noted.

During a 2017 visit to the site a broken copper figurine of a bearded hero was found, tentatively dated to the Early Dynastic period.

Imagery of the site indicates that it has been heavily looted.

== Tell Jidr (Tall Ǧidr) ==
The site (also called Tall Jidr) (31°49'30"N, 45°42'10"E), on the Tigris River in modern Al-Qādisiyyah Governorate in Iraq, lay on the ancient Iturungal canal which also connected Adab, Umma, and Zabalam. In particular it lies between Adab and Zabalam. At its maximum extent it covered an area of 130 hectares. In 1967 a survey (generally known as the Warka Survey) was conducted the region, marking Tell Jidr as site WS-004. The ancient city of Adab lay just to the northwest. Two inscribed bricks of Gudea, ruler of Lagash were found at the site. The surface of the main two mounds is dominated with the remains from the Parthian and Sassanian periods. The northeast mound is 1300 meters by 1000 meters and the somewhat lower southeast mound is 1400 meters by 700 meters. At various locations around the site remains of the Ubaid, Uruk, Early Dynastic I, Kassite, and into the Sassanian period (without evidence of Neo-Babylonian or Achaemenid on the surface). The ruins of the Early Islamic site of Imam Dhahir lies adjacent. At various times a number of city names have been proposed for the site including Karkar, Irisaĝrig, KI.AN, Kesh, and Dabrum^{ki}. The primary evidence for Karkar is an itinerary of the Uruk ruler Utu-hengal in his campaign against the Gutian ruler Tirigan and the fact that during the Ur III empire Karkar was part of the province of Umma (the city of Umma lies 17 kilometers northwest of Tell Jidr). From 2016 to 2018 the QADIS regional survey conducted satellite, drone, surface survey, soundings, and geoarchaeological boring at Tell Jidr (QD013). It found that the extended site covered 430 hectares. Two inscribed bricks of the Ur III ruler Ur-Nammu were found which contained a dedication to Ishkur which would support the identification of the location as Karkar. It is difficult to confirm at this point if the bricks have not been re-used from another location, especially in the case of the Gudea bricks. The site is heavily pitted from robbers looking for coins, glass, and jewelry. In March 2023 the Institute of Oriental Studies, Russian Academy of Sciences worked at the site.

== List of rulers ==
The following list should not be considered complete:

#	Depiction	Ruler	Succession	Epithet	Approx. dates	Notes
Early Dynastic I period (c. 2900 – c. 2700 BC)
Predynastic Sumer (c. 2900 – c. 2700 BC)
"Then Eridu fell and the kingship was taken to Bad-tibira." — Sumerian King List (SKL)
1st		En-men-lu-ana 𒂗𒈨𒂗𒇽𒀭𒈾			Uncertain, fl. c. 2856 BC (43,200 years)	Historicity uncertain; Said on the SKL to have held the title of, "King" of not just Bad-tibira; but, to have held the "Kingship" over all of Sumer; The Uruk List of Kings and Sages (ULKS) pairs him up with an apkallu (an apkallu was a sage in Sumerian literature and religion—En-men-lu-ana was paired up with Enmeduga)
2nd		En-men-gal-ana 𒂗𒈨𒂗𒃲𒀭𒈾			Uncertain, reigned c. 2844 BC (28,800 years)	Historicity uncertain; Said on the SKL to have held the title of, "King" of not just Bad-tibira; but, to have held the "Kingship" over all of Sumer; The ULKS pairs him up with an apkallu (Enmegalama)
3rd		Enmeusumgalana 𒁹𒂗𒈨𒃲𒁔𒀭𒈾			Uncertain	Historicity uncertain; Said on the SKL to have held the title of, "King" of not just Bad-tibira; but, to have held the "Kingship" over all of Sumer; The ULKS pairs him up with an apkallu (Enmebuluga)
4th		Dumuzid 𒌉𒍣𒉺𒇻		"the shepherd"	Uncertain, r. c. 2836 BC (36,000 years)	Historicity uncertain; Said on the SKL to have held the title of, "King" of not just Bad-tibira; but, to have held the "Kingship" over all of Sumer; The ULKS pairs him up with an apkallu (Anenlilda)
"3 kings; they ruled for 108,000 years. Then Bad-tibira fell and the kingship was taken to Larak." — SKL

== See also ==
- List of cities of the ancient Near East
