= Larak (Sumer) =

Ancient Iraqi city in Sumer

- 𒆷𒊏𒀝𒆠 (Sumerian)
- Larag
- Location within Near East Location within Iraq
- 32°18′45.9″N 45°39′39.6″E
- Type: City
- Periods: Ubaid, Uruk, Jemdet Nasr, Early Dynastic I, II, and III, Akkadian, Ur III, Isin-Larsa, Old Babylonian, Middle Babylonian, Neo-Assyrian, Neo-Babylonian
- Cultures: Sumer
- Associated with: Sumerians
- Location: Uncertain; somewhere in the Dhi Qar, Wasit, or Al-Qādisiyyah governorates of the Republic of Iraq
- Region: Lower Mesopotamia

Site notes
- Condition: Lost city

Larak (Note: Sumerian: 𒆷𒊏𒀝𒆠, romanized: Larak; alternatively: LA-RA-AK^{KI}; also written: UD.UD.AK^{KI}; anglicized: Larak and/or Larag; transliterated: transliterated: la.ra.ag^{ki} (Sjöberg, Leichty & Tinney 2021)) was an ancient Iraqi city in Sumer that appears in some versions of the Sumerian King List (SKL) said to have been the third among the five cities to hold the kingship over Sumer during the antediluvian era. Its patron deity was Pabilsag, a Ninurta-like warrior god additionally associated with judgment, medicine and the underworld, usually portrayed as the husband of Ninisina. Gasan-aste ("Lady (of) the Throne"), a version of the healing goddess Ninisina was worshiped at Larak.

There is no archaeological or textual support for the actual existence of the Early Dynastic city of Larak unlike the other four cities from "before the flood", it being only known from much later literary compositions. The Iron Age city of Larak, in the same general area, is supported by Neo-Assyrian and Neo-Babylonian texts. It is unclear if this was the Early Dynastic city being re-established or a completely different and unrelated city.

== Location ==
Larak is believed to be in the vicinity of the ancient city of Isin. It has been suggested that Tell al-Hayyad, a 40 hectare site, is Larak. The site is #1306 in the Adams survey. The site is 1100 meters X 450 meters and split by later canals into three parts. The central summit of the southwestern part, the largest and highest, showed as a significant Jemdat Nasr occupation and otherwise numerous Uruk period shards and limited Early Dynastic remains based on a surface survey. It has not been excavated. The site was a large city in the Early, Middle, and Late Uruk period. The 3rd millennium BC site of Tell al-Wilayah has also been proposed.

== Textual sources ==
=== Early dynastic city ===
According to the Babyloniaca of Berossus, the ruler of Shuruppak, Ubara-Tutu, mentioned in the Sumerian King List and the Epic of Gilgamesh, came from Larak.

Larak is listed as one of the five antedeluvian (before the flood) cities in the Sumerian King List. In some rescensions it is the 3rd while in others it is 4th. Only one ruler, is En-sipad-zid-ana, is mentioned in the SKL (ruling for 28.800 years) before rulership moved on to the next city.

The city is also mentioned in the Lament for Ur which states "Ninašte has abandoned the house in Larak, her sheepfold—to the wind".

In the later literary composition Inanna Lament it reads "From my brickwork of Larak, he called out after me!", referring to the destruction of her temples by some enemy.

In the Eridu Genesis, a literary composition written around 1600 BC, Larak is listed as the 3rd city i.e. "the third, Larak, she gave to Pabilsag,".

In The Destroyed House, a lament for the destruction of Isin it states "[Ni]nashte, mistress of Larak, am I—". This lament is part of the basis for assuming Larak is near Isin. Ninashte means "mistress of Ashte" where Ashte is thought to be a location in Larak.

=== Iron Age city ===
Larak is mentioned in writings of Neo-Babylonian and Neo-Assyrian times but it is not certain if this is the same city. The ruler Neo-Assyrian ruler Sennacherib (705–681 BC) listed Larak (as a city of the Chaldean Bit-Amukkani tribe) among the cities he defeated in his first military campaign.

To rebuild the Etemenanki temple of Marduk in Babylon, the neo-Babylonian ruler Nebuchadnezzar II (605-562 BC) taxed a number of towns including Larak:

"... In order to build the Etemenanki, I imposed upon them the tup-fikku-basket: Ur, Uruk, Larsa, Eridu, Kullab, Nemed-[Laguda], Ugar-[Sîn?], the entirety of [the lands of the Lower Sea], from the top to the bottom, Nippur, Isin, Larak, [Dilbat, Marad], Puqudu, Bit-[Dakkuri], Bit-Amukkani, Bit-[Åilani], Bira[tu], Der, Agade, [Dur-Åarruku], Arrapha, ..."

There are a number of records of Larak stemming from the conflict between the Neo-Babyloan ruler Marduk-apla-iddina II and the Neo-Assyrian ruler Tiglath-pileser III (745–727 BC). Various Chaldean and Aramean tribes at various times allied with and opposed these rulers and warred with each other. One raid by another Chaldean tribe was reports as carrying away 20, 000 sheep from Larak and its ruler Nadinu.

The Neo-Assyrian ruler Sargon II (722–705 BC) received a report which included

"... [ ]hayu sent a Chaldean, an informer, to Larak, (but) the Larakeans arrested him and brought him before me. I asked him, “Where are you (coming) from?” He said: “A citizen of Babylon sent me to Larak.” But they (= the Lara-keans) said, “He is a crook, he is lying! We know him the people of Nippur [told us about him(?)].”"

== List of rulers ==
The following list should not be considered complete:

#	Depiction	Ruler	Succession	Epithet	Approx. dates	Notes
Early Dynastic I period (c. 2900 – c. 2700 BC)
Predynastic Sumer (c. 2900 – c. 2700 BC)
"Then Bad-tibira fell and the kingship was taken to Larak." — Sumerian King List (SKL)
1st		En-sipad-zid-ana 𒂗𒉺𒇻𒍣𒀭𒈾			Uncertain, reigned c. 2826 BC (28,800 years)	Historicity uncertain; Known from the SKL; very little otherwise; Said on the SKL to have held the title of, "King" of not just Larak; but, to have held the "Kingship" over all of Sumer
"1 king; he ruled for 28,800 years. Then Larak fell and the kingship was taken to Sippar." — SKL

== See also ==
- Cities of the Ancient Near East

== Sources ==
- Sjöberg, Åke Waldemar; Leichty, Erle; Tinney, Steve (2021) [2003]. "Pennsylvania Sumerian Dictionary Project". Pennsylvania Sumerian Dictionary Project (PSD) (published 2003–2021).
- Whitehouse, Ruth (1977). The first cities. United Kingdom: Phaidon Press. ISBN 9780714817248.
