= En-men-lu-ana =

Mythological third King of Sumer

En-men-lu-ana 𒂗𒈨𒂗𒇽𒀭𒈾

High King of Sumer
- Reign: c. 2856 – c. 2844 BC
- Predecessor: Possibly Alalngar
- Successor: Possibly En-men-gal-ana

King of Bad-tibira
- Reign: c. 2856 – c. 2844 BC
- Predecessor: Position established
- Successor: Possibly En-men-gal-ana
- Born: Bad-tibira
Era name and dates
- Early Dynastic (ED) I period: c. 2900 – c. 2700 BC (Middle Chronology)
- Dynasty: Dynasty of Bad-tibira
- Religion: Sumerian religion

En-men-lu-ana appears as the first king of Bad-tibira in a version of the Sumerian King List. The list claims that En-men-lu-ana ruled for c. 43,200 years, and was succeeded by En-men-gal-ana. The kings on the early part of the SKL are usually not considered historical, except when they are mentioned in contemporary documents. En-men-lu-ana is not one of them.

Preceded by Possibly Alalngar	King of Sumer c. 2856 – c. 2844 BC	Succeeded by Possibly En-men-gal-ana
New title	King of Bad-tibira c. 2856 – c. 2844 BC	Succeeded by Possibly En-men-gal-ana
