= Babyloniaca (Berossus) =

Babylonian literature

The Babyloniaca (Koine Greek: Βαβυλωνιακά, Babyloniaka, "History of Babylonia") is a history of the Babylonian civilization, written as three books. It was written in Greek during the Hellenistic period around 281 BCE, by the historian and Babylonian priest, Berossus, in dedication to the ascent of Antiochus I Soter to the throne of the Seleucid Empire.

The first book describes the beginning of Babylonian civilization, geography, and cosmology (a version that resembles the cosmology of the famous creation myth Enūma Eliš), and explains the transition of mankind before and after the revelation of divine law. The second book focuses on the genealogy of Babylon, starting with the antediluvian kings down to Nabu-Naṣir in 747 BCE, and presents an account of the Mesopotamian flood myth. The third book covered the recent history of Babylonia from Nabu-Naṣir to Alexander the Great.

Although the work is now lost in its original form, it survives in substantial fragments from quotations of subsequent ancient authors, especially in the works of the first-century BCE Greco-Roman scholar Alexander Polyhistor and fourth-century CE Christian author and bishop Eusebius of Caesarea, and was known to a limited extent in learned circles in late antiquity. As a result, the Babyloniaca is known largely from third and fourth hand quotations. Substantial sections, including one on the reign of Nebuchadnezzar II, are also preserved in the writings of the Jewish historian Josephus, especially in his Antiquities of the Jews and Against Apion.

Until the rediscovery and decipherment of cuneiform texts in the 19th century, fragments of the Babyloniaca were the only genuine surviving literary material from Mesopotamian civilization.

== Content ==
The Babyloniaca was written as three books, not just with the intention of telling the history of Babylon, but as an introduction to the Greeks of Babylonian civilization as well. For Berossus, history was primarily driven by divine forces and intervention. He believed that civilization was not a product of history, but instead a core of principles known and communicated by the gods, a view that follows Mesopotamian tradition as opposed to the Greek tradition, which explained history as the unravelling of human activity and that civilization was a historical phenomenon over the course of time. The structure and progression of the three books reflect this viewpoint of Berossus.

=== Book One ===
Book One opens with an autobiographical preface, where Berossus states his intent in writing the Babyloniaca, identifying himself as both a contemporary of Alexander the Great and a Chaldean priest of Bel.

Following the preface, he starts the book with a summary describing the geography of Babylonia and the fauna and flora. Berossus writes that the land lies between the Tigris and Euphrates rivers, describing the Babylonian land in Arabia being waterless and barren and the land opposite it as mountainous and fertile. The land produces wild wheat, barley, chickpeas, sesame, gongas, dates, apples, and other fruits. Berossus also writes in Book 1 about the Sacaea festival in Babylon, in which masters were ruled by their slaves (zoganes), with slaves managing house affairs and putting on robes similar to the ones kings wore. The festival was celebrated for five days beginning with the sixteenth day of the month Loos.

Berossus proceeds to recount the Babylonian creation story, describing the appearance of the divine messenger Oannes. According to Berossus, a god and sea creature that is half-fish called Oannes, who emerged in the Persian Gulf in the first year of creation, gives humans all the culture that is important for them to have and seeing that they lacked civilization and were men living "without laws just as wild animals", he taught it to them:

"This monster spent its days with men, never eating anything, but teaching men the skills necessary for writing and for doing mathematics and for all sorts of knowledge: how to build cities, found temples, and make laws. It taught men how to determine borders and divide land, also how to plant seeds and then to harvest their fruits and vegetables. In short, it taught men all those things conducive to a settled and civilized life. Since that time, nothing further has been discovered. At the end of the day, this monster Oannes went back to the sea and spent the night. It was amphibious, able to live both on land and in the sea."

Oannes then tells humanity a cosmogony, or an explanation about how the world and its creatures originated. At first, the world was only sea and darkness. The darkness was the god Thalatth (Tiamat), and in the darkness was many creatures, who began to hybridize to form more creatures. Then, there is an account of the rebellion of the god Bel (Marduk) against Tiamat. Two versions of the story appear in the Babyloniaca, although it is not clear whether the second account was added later or was also included by Berossus. In both accounts, Bel defeats Thalatth and severs her in half. One half of her body is used to create the earth, and the other half is used to create the heavens. One of the gods cuts off his own head, and his blood is mixed with earth to create humanity. The first book ends with the rebellion of Bel.

According to historian William McCants, while it is not explicit, it is likely that Berossus intended the emergence of Oannes as happening during the reign of the first king of Babylon, Aloros (equivalent to the primordial ruler Alulim in Mesopotamian mythology). Berossus explains that several sea creatures, after Oannes, continued to come to humanity and explain again to them what was taught by Oannes, up until the reign of the seventh king, but they never added to the culture that Oannes taught.

=== Book Two ===
The second book was divided into three parts, each corresponding to the three periods since the appearance and revelation of Oannes. The first part begins with 432,000 years of history and lists the ten kings (Aloros, Alaparos, Amelon, Ammenon, Amegalaros, Daonos, Eudorachos, Amempsinos, Opartos, and Xisuthros) who reigned prior to the Mesopotamian flood myth.

The second part presents an account of the Flood (preserved in Syncellus). Berossus included it in his account about the history of Babylonia, not only to show the survival of man, but also to point out the book's main theme of how the basic principles of civilization had been communicated to men, and history was due to the result of divine revelation, not human activity. Berossus also emphasized Xisuthros' role as the last antediluvian king upon receiving divine messages. Acting on instructions from Cronus, who appeared in his dream and revealed that on the fifteenth day of the month, mankind would be destroyed, Xisuthros successfully preserved books containing principles by burying them in Sippar, City of the Sun, so that it would survive the Flood, and civilization could begin again.

The third part tells the story of the gradual reestablishment of civilization during the first ten generations after the Flood and continues on with an account of the reigns after it until Nabu-Naṣir. Due to the third part being fragmentary, and according to Polyhistor, also due to limitations of sources (such as the Neo-Babylonian chronicles which Berossus used for Book Three), there was a lack of information about the kings, and Berossus only listed them together with dates, including in some, remarks about their deeds.

=== Book Three ===
Book Three continues with the more recent succession of kings, from Nabu-Naṣir down to the reign of Alexander the Great, although the extant sections of the text do not allow us to know the degree to which Berossus merely listed this succession as opposed to providing more detailed commentary. According to Polyhistor, commentary was mostly lacking from the chain of dynastic succession contained in the second book. It is apparent that the period of the Achaemenid Empire (Persian rule) was treated briefly, with only a summary. The reigns of Sennacherib and Nebuchadnezzar II received similar treatment as well, and Berossus did not write extensively about them, which may be because the Greeks were already familiar to these figures because of Sennacherib occurring in Herodotus' writings and Nebuchadnezzar II being a folk hero.

== Cosmology ==
The first book of the Babyloniaca offers a variant (or, perhaps, an interpretation) of the cosmogony of the Enuma Elish. This work is not extant but survives in later quotations and epitomes. Berossus' account begins with a primeval ocean. Unlike in the Enuma Elish, where sea monsters are generated for combat with other gods, in Berossus' account, they emerge by spontaneous generation and are described in a different manner than the 11 monsters of the Enuma Elish, as it expands beyond the purely mythical creatures of that account in a potential case of influence from Greek zoology. The fragments of Berossus by Syncellus and the Armenian on his cosmogony are as follows:

Syncellus: There was a time, he says, when everything was [darkness and] water and that in it fabulous beings with peculiar forms came to life. For men with two wings were born and some with four wings and two faces, having one body and two heads, male and female, and double genitalia, male and female ... [a list of monstrous beings follows]. Over all these a woman ruled named Omorka. This means in Chaldaean Thalatth, in Greek it is translated as ‘Sea’ (Thalassa) ... When everything was arranged in this way, Belos rose up and split the woman in two. Of one half of her he made earth, of the other half sky; and he destroyed all creatures in her ... For when everything was moist, and creatures had come into being in it, this god took off his own head and the other gods mixed the blood that flowed out with earth and formed men. For this reason they are intelligent and share in divine wisdom. Belos, whom they translate as Zeus, cut the darkness in half and separated earth and sky from each other and ordered the universe. The creatures could not endure the power of the light and were destroyed. When Belos saw the land empty and barren, he ordered one of the gods to cut off his own head and to mix the blood that flowed out with earth and to form men and wild animals that were capable of enduring the air. Belos also completed the stars and the sun and the moon and the five planets. Alexander Polyhistor says that Berossus asserts these things in his first book.

Syncellus: They say that in the beginning all was water, which was called Sea (Thalassa). Bel made this one by assigning a place to each, and he surrounded Babylon with a wall.

Armenian: All, he said, was from the start water, which was called Sea. And Bel placed limits on them (the waters) and assigned a place to each, allocated their lands, and fortified Babylon with an enclosing wall.

The conclusion of the account states that Belus then created the stars, sun, moon, and five planets. The account of Berossus agrees largely with the Enuma Elish, such as its reference to the splitting of the woman whose halves are used to create heaven and earth, but also contain a number of differences, such as the statement about allegorical exegesis, the self-decapitation of Bel in order to create humans, and the statement that it is the divine blood which has made humans intelligent. Some debate has ensued about which elements of these may or may not go back to the original account of Berossus. Some of the information Berossus got for his account of the creation myth may have come from the Enuma Elish and the Babylonian Dynastic Chronicle.

== Historical context ==
After the conquests of Alexander the Great, the response of the newly conquered local populations was largely that of despair. However, some of the cultural and religious elite embraced the new leadership and attempted to educate their Hellenistic overlords on Mesopotamian traditions. The Babyloniaca can be thought of as emerging out of the cultural and scientific milieu fostered by the Esagila Temple.

== Transmission and preservation ==
Because almost the entirety of the Babyloniaca was reflecting Babylonian ideals on how civilization started and developed, it was not popular during the early Hellenistic period and was mostly ignored by Greek thinkers and intellectuals who thought it to be uninformed ideas of Barbarians. Those interested were Jews and Christians and scholars, such as the first century BCE writer Alexander Polyhistor, who found the information to be useful for the Romans. Although the Babyloniaca did not achieve Berossus' goal of changing Greek attitudes towards Babylonians, portions containing astromony and astrology were excerpted and became part of Hellenistic scientific and pseudo-scientific literature.

Most readers of the Babyloniaca in classical and late antiquity did not read the original, but rather an epitome, or abridgement, of it found in Polyhistor's work. This text consisted of a history of Babylonia (relying mostly on Berossus), followed by a history of Assyria. This work is also lost, but yet another epitome was made of the work of Polyhistor by Eusebius in the fourth century, in the first book of his Chronicon. Finally, this work of Eusebius is extant in its Armenian translation as well as from excerpts of the original Greek in the Ecloga Chronographica of the Byzantine monk George Syncellus. The Armenian translation was edited by Josef Karst in 1911, and the Greek excerpts of Syncellus were edited by Felix Jacoby in 1958. As historian Paul-Alian Beaulieu notes, it is likely that the fragments of the Babyloniaca don't reflect Berossus's complete narrative intent, seeing as ancient authors quoted what would mirror their interests, and that by all this transmission of epitomes and translations, material and arguments not originally present may have been included and put under his name.

== Historical importance ==
The Babyloniaca was the sole genuine source for Mesopotamian civilization, and discussions of ancient Babylon depended on Berossus' testimony until the rediscovery and decipherment of cuneiform in the 19th century. Due to cuneiform decipherments and lots of information recovery, and the establishment of the Assyriology discipline, Berossus and the Babyloniaca were neglected for some time because of factors such as unreliability and contradictory evidence. However, during the 1970s, a German archaeological expedition to Uruk discovered cuneiform texts dated to the Hellenistic period with a regnal list (kings-list) similar to what is recorded in the second book of the Babyloniaca.

This discovery bolstered scholars' confidence that the Babyloniaca could attest to genuine material from earlier periods, which, in turn, renewed interest and revived the scholarship addressing this work. According to historian Stanley M. Burstein, the fragments of Babyloniaca and subsequent quotations still possess great value for those interested in ancient Near Eastern history because "they represent both the only known attempt by a Babylonian intellectual to survey his own culture and our best evidence for the state of Babylonian literary tradition in the early Hellenistic period".

== Translations ==
- Burstein, Stanley Mayer. The Babyloniaca of Berossus, Undena Publications, 1978.
- Verbrugghe, Gerald; Wickersham, John Moore (2001). Berossos and Manetho, Introduced and Translated: Native Traditions in Ancient Mesopotamia and Egypt. University of Michigan Press.
- De Breucker, Geert. "Berossos of Babylon (680)" in Brill's New Jacoby, Brill, 2015.

== See also ==
- Babylonia
- Berossus
- Ancient Near Eastern cosmology
- Graeco-Babyloniaca
