= En-men-gal-ana =

Mythological fourth king of Sumer

En-men-gal-ana 𒂗𒈨𒂗𒃲𒀭𒈾

High King of Sumer
- Reign: c. 2844 – c. 2836 BC
- Predecessor: Possibly En-men-lu-ana
- Successor: Possibly Dumuzid

King of Bad-tibira
- Reign: c. 2844 – c. 2836 BC
- Predecessor: Possibly En-men-lu-ana
- Successor: Possibly Dumuzid
- Born: Bad-tibira
Era name and dates
- Early Dynastic (ED) I period: c. 2900 – c. 2700 BC (Middle Chronology)
- Dynasty: Dynasty of Bad-tibira
- Religion: Sumerian religion

En-men-gal-ana appears as the second king of Bad-tibira in some versions of the Sumerian King List. According to that literary composition, En-men-gal-ana ruled for 28,800 years. The kings on the early part of the SKL are usually not considered historical, except when they are mentioned in Early Dynastic documents. En-men-gal-ana is not one of them.

Preceded by En-men-lu-ana	4th King of Sumer c. 2844 – c. 2836 BC	Succeeded by Dumuzid
Preceded by En-men-lu-ana	King of Bad-tibira c. 2844 – c. 2836 BC	Succeeded by Dumuzid
