= Weld-Blundell Prism =

Sumerian King List inscribed on a vertical clay prism

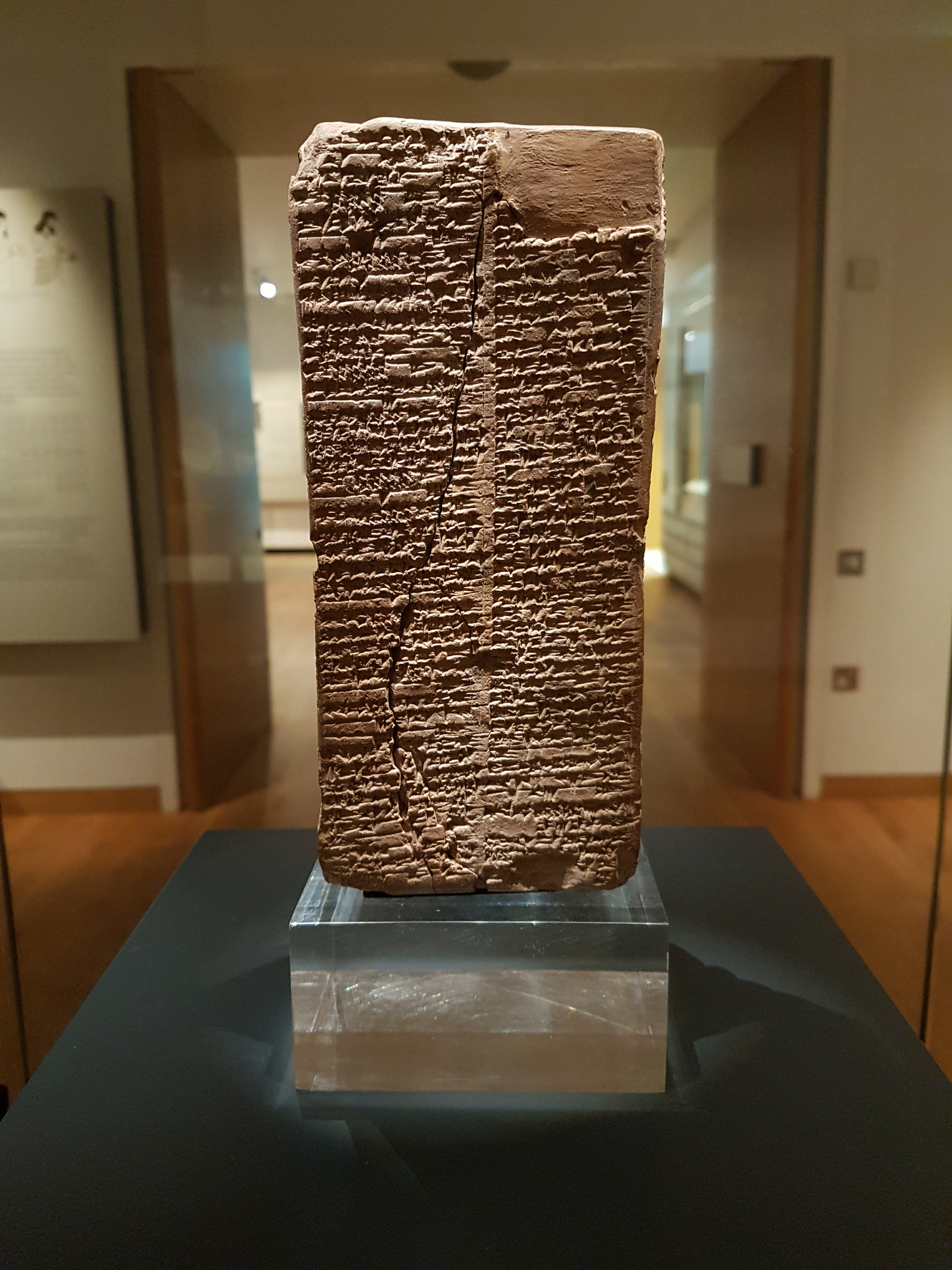
- The Prism in the Ashmolean Museum
- Material: Clay
- Height: c. 20 cm
- Width: c. 9 cm
- Created: c. 1800 BC
- Discovered: 1922; Dhi Qar, Iraq
- Present location: Ashmolean Museum, England, United Kingdom
- Registration: AN1923.444

The Weld-Blundell Prism (WB) is a clay, cuneiform-inscribed vertical prism housed in the Ashmolean Museum in Oxford. The prism was found in a 1922 expedition in Larsa in modern-day Iraq by British archaeologist Herbert Blundell. The prism's four sides, about 20 cm × 9 cm (8 in × 3.5 in), are inscribed in Sumerian with lists of the kings of Sumer; each side contains the text in two columns: this is the famous Sumerian King List. It is considered the most complete of the Sumerian King Lists which have been found, of which there are approximately 25 more or less complete fragments as of 2016.

The list begins with the antediluvian rulers and ends with Suen-magir of the Isin dynasty. The list was most likely written in Sin-magir's final year, or soon after. Many, especially antediluvian, kings are credited with incredibly long reigns (counted in sars and nerah), as a result of which many scholars consider this work to be more fictional rather than historical.

Various theories have been constructed in an attempt to explain such large numbers. They are supposed to express the great importance of rulers who were considered demigods. According to another version, sar (3,600 years) and ner (600 years), units of time measurement in the Sumerian number system, should be taken as years and months, respectively.

This text of the Old Babylonian period (Isin dynasty) is inscribed in traditional Sumerian cuneiform.

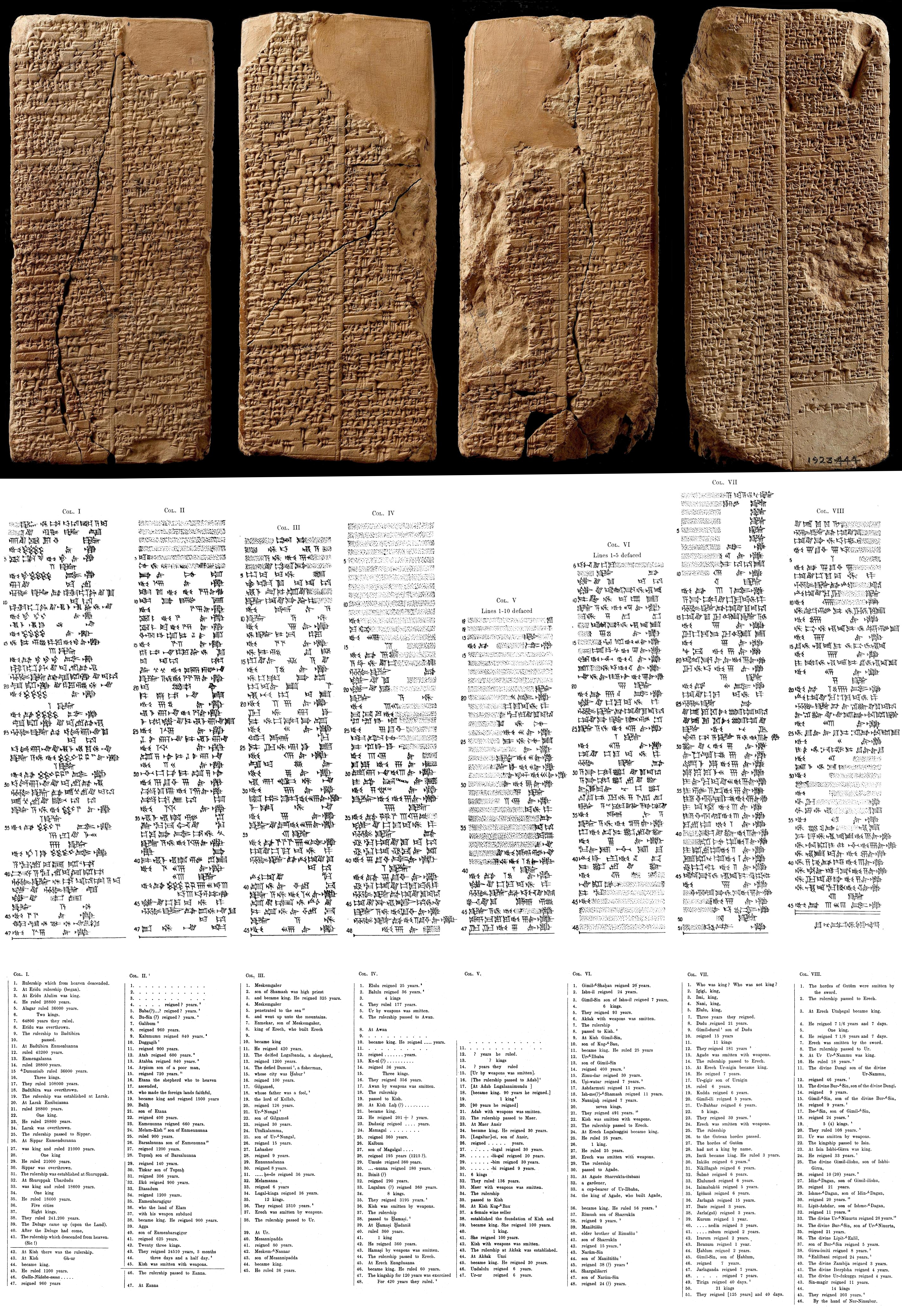
The Weld-Blundell Prism, with transcription and translation by Stephen Langdon

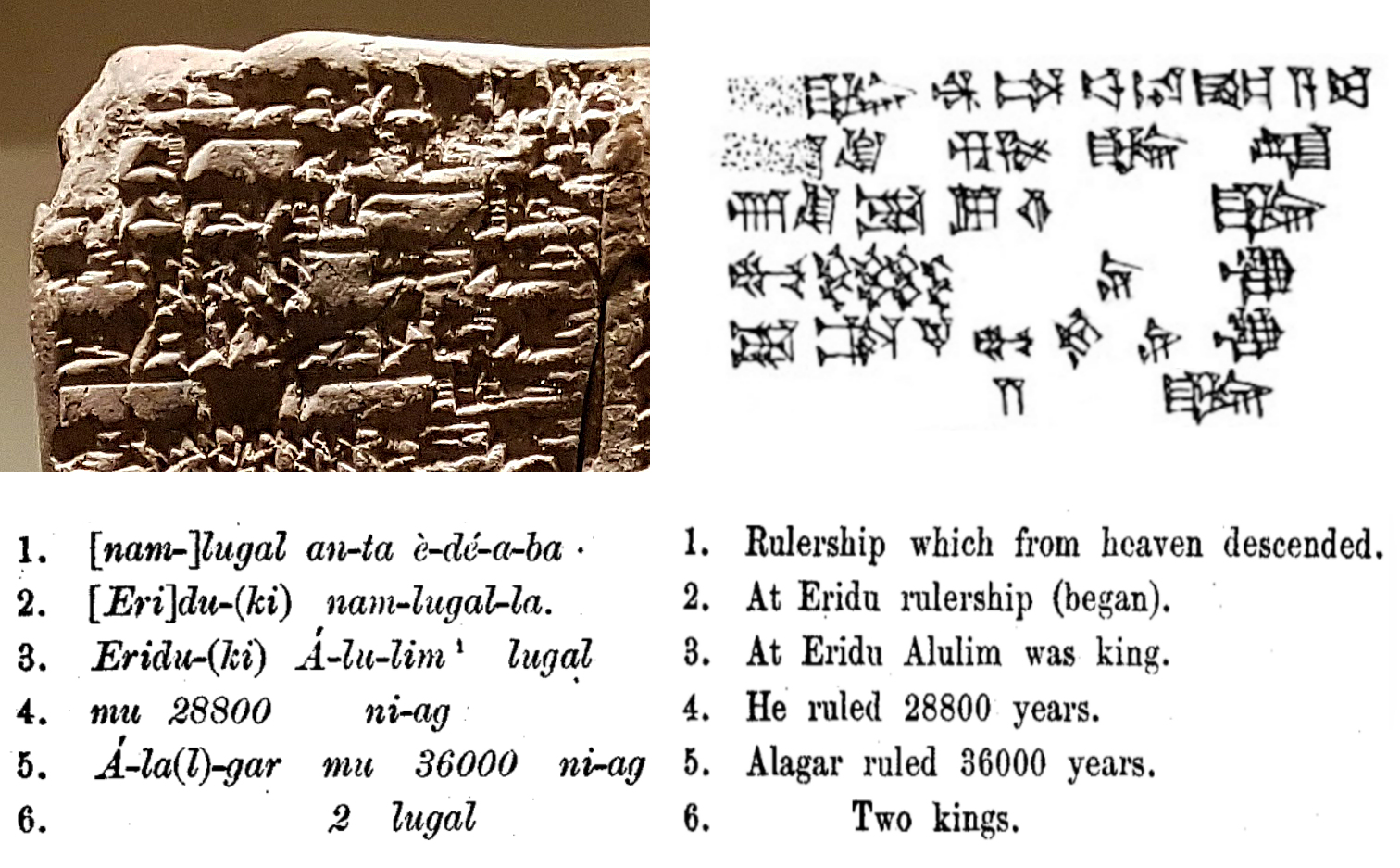
Weld-Blundell Prism, initial paragraph about the rule of Alulim and Alalngar in Eridu for 64,800 years

== See also ==
- List of Mesopotamian dynasties
