= Abydenus =

Ancient Greek historian

Abydenus or Abydenos (Ancient Greek: Ἀβυδηνός, romanized: Abudinós) was a Greek historian who wrote a history of Assyria and Babylonia entitled On the Assyrians. Only some fragments are preserved by Eusebius in his Praeparatio Evangelica and the Armenian translation of his Chronicon; by Cyril of Alexandria in his work against the Emperor Julian; and by George Syncellus.

It is uncertain when he lived. He made use of the Chaldaika of Alexander Polyhistor, who wrote between 80 and 40 BC, and the earliest writer to cite him is Eusebius, writing around AD 300. Abydenus could have been alive at any point between these dates, but he most likely worked during the Second Sophistic in the 2nd and 3rd centuries AD. Cyril states that he wrote in the Ionic dialect. He is to be distinguished from Palaephatus Abydenus, who lived in the time of Alexander the Great.
