= Berossus =

3rd-century BC Babylonian writer, priest and astronomer

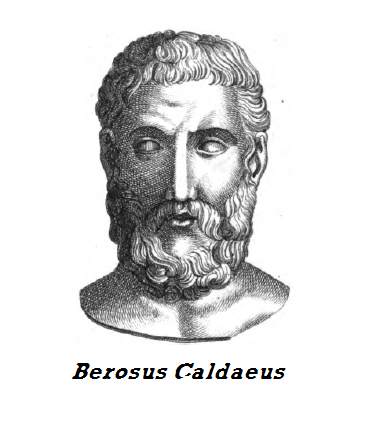

Berossus (/bəˈrɒsəs/) or Berosus (/bəˈroʊsəs/; Ancient Greek: Βηρωσσός, romanized: Bērōssos; possibly derived from Late Babylonian Akkadian: 𒁹𒀭𒂗𒉺𒇻𒋙𒉡, romanized: Bēl-reʾû-šunu, lit. 'Bel is his shepherd') was an early-3rd-century BC Hellenistic-era Babylonian writer, priest of Bel Marduk, and astronomer who wrote in the Koine Greek language.

His original works, including the Babyloniaca (Ancient Greek: Βαβυλωνιακά), are lost, but fragments survive in some quotations, largely in the writings of the fourth-century AD early Christian writer Eusebius.

Berossus has recently been identified with Bēl-reʾû-šunu, a high priest of the Esagila Temple in the city of Babylon, as mentioned in a document from 258 BC.

== Name ==
The name "Berossus" likely originates from a theophoric name whose first component was Bel, meaning "Lord", which was a common title for Marduk. The original name was either Bēl-rē’ûšunu, meaning "the god Bel is their shepherd", or Bēl-uṣuršu, meaning "O Bel watch over him!"

== Life and work ==
Using ancient Babylonian records and texts that are now lost, Berossus published the Babyloniaca (hereafter, History of Babylonia) in three books some time around 290–278 BC, by the patronage of the Macedonian/Seleucid king Antiochus I Soter (during the third year of his reign, according to Tatian, Oratio ad Graecos 36.). Certain astrological fragments recorded by Pliny the Elder, Censorinus, Flavius Josephus, and Marcus Vitruvius Pollio are also attributed to Berossus, but are of unknown provenance, or indeed are uncertain as to where they might fit into his History. Vitruvius credits him with the invention of a semi-circular sundial hollowed out of a cubical block. A statue of him was erected in Athens, perhaps attesting to his fame and scholarship as historian and astronomer-astrologer.

Justin Martyr said that Berossus had a daughter, who was the Sibyll of Babylon, who taught truths similar to those of the Biblical prophets.

A separate work, Procreatio, is attributed to him by the Latin commentaries on Aratus, Commentariorum in Aratum Reliquiae, but there is no proof of this connection. However, a direct citation (name and title) is rare in antiquity, and it may have referred to Book 1 of his History.

He was born during or before Alexander the Great's reign over Babylon (330–323 BC), with the earliest date suggested as 340 BC. According to Vitruvius's work De architectura, he relocated eventually to the island of Kos off the coast of Asia Minor and established a school of astronomy there by the patronage of the king of Egypt. However, scholars have questioned whether it would have been possible to work under the Seleucids and then relocate to a region experiencing Ptolemaic control late in life. It is not known when he died.

== Babyloniaca (History of Babylonia) ==
Versions of the remains of Berossos' lost Babyloniaca are given by two later Greek epitomes that were used by the Christian Eusebius of Caesarea for his Chronological Canons, the Greek manuscripts of which have been lost, but which can be largely recovered by the Latin translation and continuation of Jerome and a surviving Armenian translation. The reasons why Berossus wrote the History have not survived, though contemporaneous Greek historians generally did give reasons for the publication of their own histories. It is suggested that it was commissioned by Antiochus I, perhaps desiring a history of one of his newly acquired lands, or by priesthood of the Great Temple of Marduk, seeking justification for the worship of Marduk in Seleucid lands. Pure history writing per se was not a Babylonian concern, and Josephus testifies to Berossus' reputation as an astrologer. The excerpts quoted recount mythology and history that relate to Old Testament concerns. As historian and archaeologist W.G. Lambert observes: "Of course Berossus may have written other works which are not quoted by Josephus and Eusebius because they lacked any Biblical interest". Lambert finds some statements in the Latin writers so clearly erroneous that it renders doubtful whether the writers had first-hand knowledge of Berossus' text.

=== Sources and content ===
The Armenian translations of Eusebius and Syncellus' transmissions (Chronicon and Ecloga Chronographica, respectively) both record Berossus' use of "public records" and it is possible that Berossus catalogued his sources. This did not make him reliable, only that he was careful with the sources and his access to priestly and sacred records allowed him to do what other Babylonians could not. What we have of ancient Mesopotamian myth is somewhat comparable with Berossus, though the exact integrity with which he transmitted his sources is unknown because much of the literature of Mesopotamia has not survived. What is clear is that the form of writing he used was dissimilar to actual Babylonian literature, writing as he did in Greek.

=== Book 1 ===
Book 1 fragments are preserved in Eusebius and Syncellus above, one of the main sources for knowledge about ancient near eastern cosmology in late antiquity due to its description of the Babylonian creation account and establishment of order, including the defeat of Thalatte (Tiamat) by Bel (Marduk). According to him, all knowledge was revealed to humans by the sea monster Oannes after the Creation, and so Verbrugghe and Wickersham (2000:17) have suggested that this is where the astrological fragments discussed above would fit, if at all.

=== Book 2 ===
Book 2 describes the history of the Babylonian kings from Alulim down to Nabonassar (747–734 BC). Eusebius reports that Apollodorus reports that Berossus recounts 432,000 years from the first king Aloros (Alulim) to the tenth king Xisouthros and the Babylonian Flood. From Berossus' genealogy, it is clear that he had access to king-lists in compiling this section of History, particularly in the kings before the Flood, and from the 7th century BC with Senakheirimos (Sennacherib, who ruled both Assyria and Babylon). His account of the Flood (preserved in Syncellus) is extremely similar to versions of the Epic of Gilgamesh that we have presently. However, in Gilgamesh, the main protagonist is Utnapishtim, while for Berossus, Xisouthros is probably a Greek transliteration of Ziusudra, the protagonist of the Sumerian version of the Flood.

Perhaps what Berossus omits to mention is also noteworthy. Much information on Sargon (c. 2300 BC) would have been available during his time (e.g., a birth legend preserved at El-Amarna and in an Assyrian fragment from 8th century BC, and two Neo-Babylonian fragments), but these were not mentioned. Similarly, the great Babylonian king Hammurabi (c. 1750 BC) merits only passing mention. He did, however, mention that the queen Semiramis (probably Sammuramat, wife of Samshi-Adad V, 824–811 BC) was Assyrian. Perhaps it was in response to Greek writers mythologising her to the point where she was described as the founder of Babylon, daughter of the Syrian goddess Derketo, and married to Ninus (the legendary founder of Nineveh, according to Greek authors).

=== Book 3 ===
Book 3 relates the history of Babylon from Nabonassar to Antiochus I (presumably). Again, it is likely that he used king-lists (i.e., regnal lists), though it is not known which ones he used. The Mesopotamian documents known as King-List A (one copy from the 6th or 5th centuries BC) and Chronicle 1 (3 copies with one confidently dated to 500 BC) are usually suggested as the ones he used, due to the synchronicity between those and his History (though there are some differences). A large part of his history around the time of Naboukhodonosoros (Nebuchadnezzar II, 604–562 BC) and Nabonnedos (Nabonidus, 556–539 BC) survives. Here we see his interpretation of history for the first time, moralising about the success and failure of kings based on their moral conduct. This is similar to another Babylonian history, Chronicle of Nabonidus (as well as to the Hebrew Bible), and differs from the rationalistic accounts of other Greek historians like Thucydides.

At the time of the Jewish historian Josephus (1st century AD), the historical records contained in Berossus' third book of his History were still extant and were used by Josephus in citing the regnal years of six Babylonian kings. Josephus' record of regnal years for these kings is also corroborated by Ptolemy of Alexandria in his Canon, excepting for the fact that the king that reigned between Neglissar and Nabonnedus is omitted by Ptolemy.

Nabopolassar = reigned 21 years.
Nebuchadnezzar b. Nabuchodonosor = reigned 43 years.
Evil Merodach (also called Amel-Marduk) = reigned 2 years. (Josephus, elsewhere, contradicts Berossus, saying that Evil Merodach reigned 18 years).
Neglissar (Neriglissoor) = reigned 4 years (Josephus, elsewhere, says that Neglissar reigned 40 years, which seems odd that it is a factor of 10).
Laborosoarchod (Labosordacus) = reigned 9 months.
Nabonnedus (also known as Baltasar) = reigned 17 years, in which year, Cyrus king of Persia and Darius king of Media took Babel (Borsippus) from the Chaldaeans.

=== Transmission and reception ===
Berossus' work was not popular during the Hellenistic period. The usual account of Mesopotamian history was Ctesias of Cnidus's Persica, while most of the value of Berossus was considered to be his astrological writings. Most pagan writers probably never read the History directly, and seem to have been dependent on Posidonius of Apamea (135–50 BC), who cited Berossos in his works. While Poseidonius's accounts have not survived, the writings of these tertiary sources do: Vitruvius Pollio (a contemporary of Caesar Augustus), Pliny the Elder (d. 79 AD), and Seneca the Younger (d. 65 AD). Seven later pagan writers probably transmitted Berossus via Poseidonius through an additional intermediary. They were Aetius (1st or 2nd century AD), Cleomedes (second half of 2nd century AD), Pausanias (c. 150 AD), Athenaeus (c. 200 AD), Censorinus (3rd century AD), and an anonymous Latin commentator on the Greek poem Phaenomena by Aratus of Soloi (c. 315–240/39 BC).

Jewish and Christian references to Berossus probably had a different source, either Alexander Polyhistor (c. 65 BC) or Juba II of Mauretania (c. 50 BC – 20 AD). Polyhistor's numerous works included a history of Assyria and Babylonia, while Juba wrote On the Assyrians, both using Berossus as their primary sources. Josephus' records of Berossus include some of the only extant narrative material, but he is probably dependent on Alexander Polyhistor, even if he did give the impression that he had direct access to Berossus. The fragments of the Babylonaica found in three Christian writers' works are probably dependent on Alexander or Juba (or both). They are Tatianus of Syria (2nd century AD), Theophilus of Antioch (180 AD), and Titus Flavius Clemens (c. 200 AD).

Like that of Poseidonius, neither Alexander's nor Juba's works have survived. However, the material in Berossus was recorded by Abydenus (c. 200 BC) and Sextus Julius Africanus (early 3rd century AD). Both their works are also lost, possibly considered too long,. Eusebius Bishop of Caesaria (c. 260–340 AD), in his work the Chronicon, preserved some of their accounts. The Greek text of the Chronicon is also now lost to us but there is an ancient Armenian translation (500–800 AD) of it, and portions are quoted in Georgius Syncellus's Ecloga Chronographica (c. 800–810 AD). Nothing of Berossus survives in Jerome's Latin translation of Eusebius. Eusebius' other mentions of Berossus in Praeparatio Evangelica are derived from Josephus, Tatianus, and another inconsequential source (the last cite contains only, "Berossus the Babylonian recorded Naboukhodonosoros in his history").

Christian writers after Eusebius are probably reliant on him; these include Pseudo-Justinus (3rd–5th century), Hesychius of Alexandria (5th century), Agathias (536–582), Moses of Chorene (8th century), an unknown geographer of unknown date, and the Suda (Byzantine dictionary from the 10th century). Thus, what little of Berossus remains is very fragmentary and indirect. The most direct source of material on Berossus is Josephus, received from Alexander Polyhistor. Most of the names in his king-lists and most of the potential narrative content have been lost or corrupted as a result. Only Eusebius and Josephus preserve narrative material, and both had agendas. Eusebius was looking to construct a consistent chronology across different cultures, while Josephus was attempting to refute the charges that there was a civilization older than that of the Jews. However, the ten ante-diluvian kings were preserved by Christian apologists interested in how the long lifespans of the kings were similar to the long lifespans of the ante-diluvian ancestors in the story of Genesis.

== Memory ==
In later centuries, Berossus was remembered as a great astronomer, prophet, sage, and historiographer. For example, Pliny the Elder reports that a statue of Berossus was put up by the inhabitants of Athens due to the accuracy of his future-predictions. Another figure, Pausanias, says that Berossus was the father of the Hebrew Sibyl.

In an isolated report from Vitruvius, it is claimed that Berossus founded a school of astronomy at the Island of Kos, although this is typically dismissed as a later invention. Some historians have suggested that the tale originated to provide a story that creates continuity between Babylonian and Greek astronomy.

Berossus gained a reputation so that many authors in subsequent centuries would falsely attribute his name to their own works so as to increase its prestige.

In 1498, Annius of Viterbo claimed to have discovered lost books of Berossus. These were in fact an elaborate forgery. However, they greatly influenced Renaissance ways of thinking about population and migration, because Annius provided a list of kings from Japhet onwards, filling a historical gap following the Biblical account of the Flood. Annius also introduced characters from classical sources into the biblical framework, publishing his account as Commentaria super opera diversorum auctorum de antiquitatibus loquentium (Commentaries on the Works of Various Authors Discussing Antiquity). One consequence was sophisticated theories about Celtic races with Druid priests in Western Europe.

The crater Berosus on the Moon was named after him.
