= Bilulu =

Mesopotamian goddess

- Deified rain cloud
- Other names: possibly Ninbilulu

Genealogy
- Children: Girgire

Bilulu was a Mesopotamian goddess who most likely functioned as the deification of rain clouds. She might be related to Ninbilulu known from a number of Early Dynastic texts. She is known from the myth Inanna and Bilulu, in which she is responsible for the death of Dumuzi. This event is subsequently avenged by Inanna, who turns Bilulu into a waterskin.

== Name, character and origin ==
In 1953 Samuel Noah Kramer and Thorkild Jacobsen proposed that Bilulu functioned as a personified thunderstorm or rain cloud. According to Daniel Schwemer this interpretation remains plausible, and finds support in the translation of the name of her son Girgire, "lightning bolt". However, the precise meaning of her own name is not known. She was referred to as um-ma, "old woman". Manuel Ceccarelli proposes that she might have functioned as a figure comparable to Frau Holle or Perchta from German folklore.

=== Bilulu, Ninbilulu and Enbilulu ===
It is presumed that Bilulu might be related to the Early Dynastic deity Ninbilulu, who is already attested in the Fara and Abu Salabikh god lists, as well as in the Zame Hymns, in the last of these sources as a deity associated with various sources of water, including Tigris and Euphrates. Julia M. Asher-Greve suggests that the theonym Bilulu is older, and the cuneiform sign nin could be added to it as a prefix. Daniel Schwemer also considers Bilulu to be the original form. Antoine Cavigneaux and Manfred Krebernik assume Ninbilulu might be identified with Enbilulu, a deity associated with irrigation consistently regarded as male. However, according to Joan Goodnick Westenholz it is possible Ninbilulu was a goddess at some point, and that either she came to be viewed as male later, or that female and male derivatives of her coexisted.

== Inanna and Bilulu ==
While the theonym Ninbilulu does not appear in any sources postdating the Early Dynastic period, Bilulu is present in the myth Inanna and Bilulu. The text is poorly preserved, and has been dated to between the nineteenth and seventeenth century BCE. According to Uri Gabbay, it is difficult to tell if it originally functioned as part of the scribal school curriculum, or as a liturgical text. The plot revolves around the death of Dumuzi. It presents a tradition distinct from that known from Inanna's Descent, as Inanna's actions are meant to avenge him. The cause of Dumuzi's death is a raid on his dwelling conducted by Bilulu and her son Girgire. (Note: According to Richard L. Litke, the latter deity might also be mentioned in the god list An = Anum (tablet IV, line 264) though the glosses provided there would imply that in this case the name, while written as ^{d}GÍR.GÍR, should be read as Ulul.) Inanna is informed about Bilulu's role in the events by a nameless servant of Dumuzi. She recites a paean in his memory, praising his skills as a shepherd, and decides that she needs to avenge him by killing Bilulu. She finds her in her dwelling, and places a curse upon her:

Begone! I have killed you; so it is indeed, and with you I destroy also your name!

Bilulu subsequently gets turned into a waterskin, and she and her son are tasked with acting as the tutelary deities of the desert, who are "no one's child and no one's friend", and have to inform the deceased Dumuzi whenever a libation is poured out for him. The transformation might be meant to give the myth an etiological meaning. The rest of the composition is focused on Inanna mourning Dumuzi's death alongside his sister Geshtinanna and his mother Duttur. Samuel Noah Kramer and Thorkild Jacobsen concluded the composition ends with a formula praising Dumuzi:

How truly she proved the equal of Dumuzi, avenging him; by killing Bilulu, Inana proved equal to him!

However, according to Steve Tinney this interpretation might have been partially mistaken, and the passage should be retranslated:

Thus she evens the score for Dumuzi, having avenged him. Bilulu is dead! Inana evened the score!
