= Geshtinanna =

Mesopotamian goddess

- Scribe of the Underworld
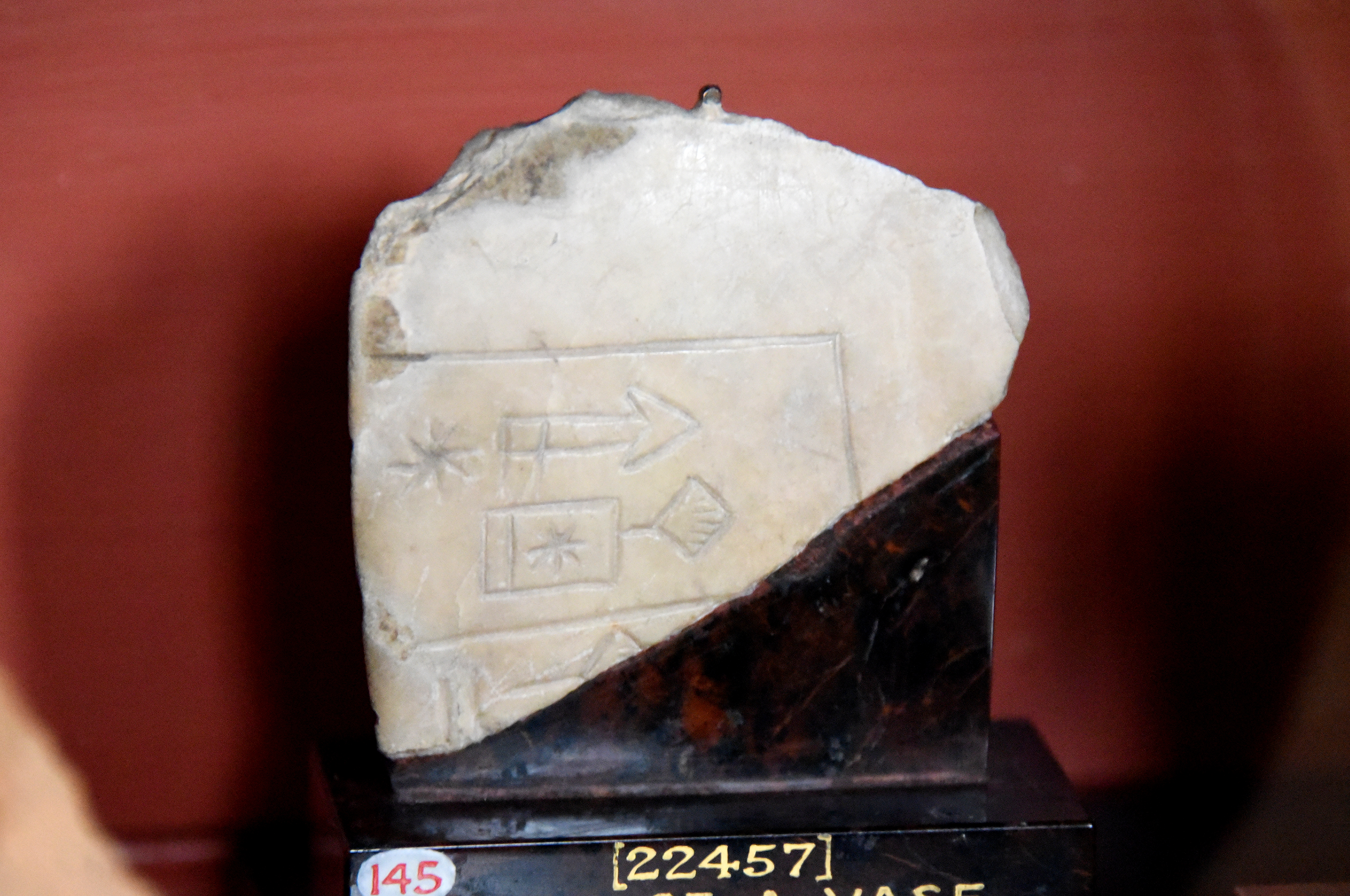
- Fragment of a marble bowl from Uruk inscribed with the name of Geshtinanna, currently housed in the British Museum
- Major cult center: Sagub

Genealogy
- Parents: Duttur
- Siblings: Dumuzi, Belili
- Consort: Ningishzida (in Lagash); Amurru (rarely)

Equivalents
- Akkadian: Belet-Seri

Geshtinanna was a Mesopotamian goddess best known due to her role in myths about the death of Dumuzi, her brother. It is not certain what functions she fulfilled in the Mesopotamian pantheon, though her association with the scribal arts and dream interpretation is well attested. She could serve as a scribe in the underworld, where according to the myth Inanna's Descent she had to reside for a half of each year in place of her brother.

Evidence for the worship of Geshtinanna is mostly available from the Early Dynastic state of Lagash, where she had her own cult center, Sagub. She was also present in the pantheons of other cities, for example in Uruk and Tell al-Rimah. She ceased to be venerated after the Old Babylonian period, though even later on she was still mentioned in god lists and in literary texts, some of which were still copied during the period of Seleucid rule over Mesopotamia.

== Name ==
The oldest writing of Geshtinanna's name was Amageshtin or Amageshtinanna, as attested in documents from Lagash from the Early Dynastic period. There is no agreement over whether Amageshtin was a shortened form of Amageshtinanna or if the suffix -anna was added to a pre-existing name, but Manfred Krebernik argues the latter is more likely, as Amageshtin is attested as an ordinary personal name in the Early Dynastic period. In later sources, the form "Geshtinanna" was the most commonly used one. It might have developed due to the prefix ama (Sumerian: "mother") being considered an epithet. In Emesal, a dialect of Sumerian, the name was rendered as Mutinanna. The conventional translation of the standard form of the name is "grapevine of heaven", though it is possible that the word geštin also had the metaphorical meaning "sweet" or "lovely".

A further variant of the name was Ningeshtinanna. The cuneiform sign NIN can be translated as "lady", "queen" or "mistress" when used in the names of female deities, and it could sometimes be added as a prefix to names of established goddesses, in addition to Geshtinanna for example Aruru or Aya. This form of Geshtinanna's is attested for example in the Canonical Temple List and in the name of a skin disease, hand of Ningeshtinanna. A shorter form also including the sign NIN, Ningeshtin ("lady of the vine") is known from inscriptions on seals from the Kassite period.

It has additionally been pointed out that Ninedina, a direct Sumerian equivalent of the Akkadian name Belet-Seri, which designated a goddess who corresponded to Geshtinanna, can be found in the early Fara god list already, but it is unknown if this goddess was one and the same as Geshtinanna.

Andrew R. George argues that in Bad-tibira, the cult center of Dumuzi, Geshtinanna was known under the name Ninsheshegarra. He points out the existence of a reference to such a goddess being worshiped in the temple Esheshegarra ("house established by the brother") in this city.

== Character ==
Geshtinanna's functions remain unclear. It is known that she was the dubsar-mah aralike, "chief scribe of the underworld". This role is described in detail in one of the Udug-hul incantations. She was believed to be responsible for keeping track of the dead, and for permitting them to enter the underworld. However, it is possible her association with the underworld was only a secondary development. Her association with scribal arts and surveying is also attested in other contexts, where she is a heavenly, rather than underworld, deity. The myth Dumuzi's Dream describes her as the "scribe proficient in tablets" and "singer expert in songs" and highlights her wisdom. Similar associations are present in various poems from the reign of Shulgi.

She was also associated with dream interpretation, though this function could generally be assigned to female deities. Tonia Sharlach additionally argues that she was connected with vegetation, but it is not known if her name has any relation to her role.

Her iconography is unknown, but it is possible that the depictions of a goddess accompanied by a mushussu known from Lagash can be identified as her, with the mythical beast serving as a representation of Ningishzida, her husband in the local tradition. The mushussu was portrayed looking at the goddess in such works of art.

== Worship ==
The worship of Geshtinanna is attested for the first time in the Early Dynastic period. However, she was a goddess of minor importance overall. An early center of her cult was Sagub, a settlement located near Lagash. At least two references to gudu priests connected to her cult in the state of Lagash are known. Under the name Amageshtin, she appears in an inscription of Urukagina. She had a temple in Girsu, built by Ur-Baba. It is possible that another temple dedicated to her, the Esagug, was located in Sagub. It was rebuilt by Enannatum I, and subsequently desecrated during a raid of Lugalzaggesi. He reportedly plundered the precious metals and lapis lazuli the statue of Geshtinanna was decorated with, and then threw it into a well. A later ruler of Lagash, Gudea, dedicated multiple statues to Geshtinanna. While he invoked many members of the Mesopotamian pantheon in his inscriptions, three of them - Geshtinanna, Nanshe and Ningirsu - were singled out as those who "turned their zi gaze" to him, a term apparently normally referring to the way they looked at other deities.

Geshtinanna was also worshiped around Uruk as one of the deities associated with Inanna and Dumuzi. However, her connection with this city was not as pronounced as that between her and the territory of Lagash. It is possible that the temple Esheshegarra in Bad-tibira was dedicated to her. It was built by Ur-gigir of Uruk, son of Ur-nigin. A temple dedicated jointly to her and Dumuzi, the Eniglulu, "house of teeming flocks," is also attested, but its location is unknown. The Sumerian term niglulu often appears in compositions about Dumuzi and refers to his herds.

Later sources show that Geshtinanna continued to be worshiped through the Ur III period, as attested in documents from Girsu, Puzrish-Dagan and Umma. Those from the last of these cities identify the center of her local cult as KI.AN_{ki}, a nearby town which was associated with Shara. The Puzrish-Dagan texts indicate she was worshiped in one of the royal palaces, though not necessarily in a fixed location, with Ur, Uruk and Nippur all being possibilities. One of the royal celebrations dedicated to her might have been related to the funerary cult and involved a visit of the goddess in the palace. A single document mentions offerings made to her alongside those to Ninisina, Dagan and Išḫara. A references to Geshtinanna being celebrated in the temple of Ninsun in Kuara is also known. An unusual phenomenon attested in this period was the apparent identification of Shulgi's mother SI.A-tum (reading uncertain) as a manifestation of Geshtinanna. No other queen from the Third Dynasty of Ur was deified in any way, nor was Ur-Nammu, its founder and Shulgi's father.

In the Old Babylonian period, Geshtinanna was worshiped in Isin, Nippur, Uruk and Tell al-Rimah (Qattara). References to her are known from personal letters from this period, though they are uncommon. The frequency of her appearances in them is lower than that of popular deities, such as Ishtar, Annunitum, Aya, Ninsianna or Gula, and comparable to Ninmug's, Ninkarrak's or Ninegal's.

Only a few theophoric names invoking Geshtinanna are known. Examples include Gu-Geshtinannaka, Geme-Geshtinanna, Lu-Geshtinanna and Ur-Geshtinanna. Only a single attestation of one of them, specifically Ur-Geshtinanna, occurs in documents from Early Dynastic Lagash.

Active worship of Geshtinanna ceased after the Old Babylonian period, but she continued to appear in god lists and especially in literary texts about Dumuzi as late as in the Seleucid period.

== Associations with other deities ==
Geshtinanna's brother was Dumuzi. It has been argued that she was imagined as older than him, since she could be referred to with epithets such as ama ("mother") and umma ("old woman" or "wise woman"). Their mother was Duttur. An alternate tradition, attested in a hymn of Shulgi, refers to Anu and his wife Urash as Geshtinanna's parents. Belili was regarded as a sister of Geshtinanna and Dumuzi. It has been suggested that she could be viewed as an equivalent of Geshtinanna. However, Manfred Krebernik discusses Belili and Gesthinanna as two independent goddesses each of whom could be described as Dumuzi's sister. They also both appear in the myth Dumuzi's Dream, each in a separate role.

Due to Dumuzi's marriage to Inanna, Geshtinanna was the sister-in-law of this goddess. She is directly referred to as her "beloved sister-in-law" in the composition labeled as Inanna D in modern literature, though she is only listed after the members of her immediate family (Ningal, Suen, Utu, Dumuzi) and Ninshubur, addressed as the "beloved vizier."

A network of syncretic relations existed between Geshtinanna, Azimua, Belet-Seri and, by extension, with Ashratum (also known under the Sumerian name Gubarra). From the reign of Gudea of Lagash to the Ur III period, it was common for Geshtinanna to be identified with Azimua, who the wife of Ningishzida. In a tradition originating in Lagash, Geshtinanna came to be viewed as Ningishzida's spouse herself. However, in Old Babylonian god list she is kept apart from Ningishzida. From the same period onward, Belet-Seri started to be recognized as the Akkadian counterpart of Geshtinanna. However, Belet-Seri also functioned as an epithet of Ashratum. In a handful of cases Geshtinanna is therefore listed as the wife of Amurru instead of her. Julia M. Asher-Greve cites two examples of cylinder seals from Old Babylonian Sippar where Geshtinanna is paired with ^{d}MAR.TU (Amurru).

In the myth Dumuzi's Dream, Geshtinanna is assisted by the goddess Geshtindudu, described as her "adviser and girlfriend." The relationship between Geshtinanna and Geshtindudu is regarded as unique due to being based on friendship. It has been suggested that some works of art showing a pair of goddesses stands side by side might represent Geshtinanna and Geshtindudu.

In the Weidner god list, Geshtinanna is placed near the circle of deities associated with Ishkur, after his wife Shala, their son Misharu, Išḫara and the deity ^{d}MAŠ-da-ad. Daniel Schwemer based on a later text assumes ^{d}MAŠ-da-ad was a form of the weather god himself worshiped in the city of Pada, but Manfred Krebernik argues it should be read as Pardat, "the dreadful," the name of a sparsely attested goddess also known from the god list An = Anum. He proposes that she, Išḫara and Geshtinanna were placed one after another because of their shared association with the underworld. The association between Geshtinanna and Ishkur is not attested in any later god lists, but they are invoked together in some blessing formulas in letters from Tell al-Rimah. There is however no indication that they were regarded as a couple, and it is likely Geshtinanna appears in these texts due to being the personal deity of one of the writers.

== Mythology ==
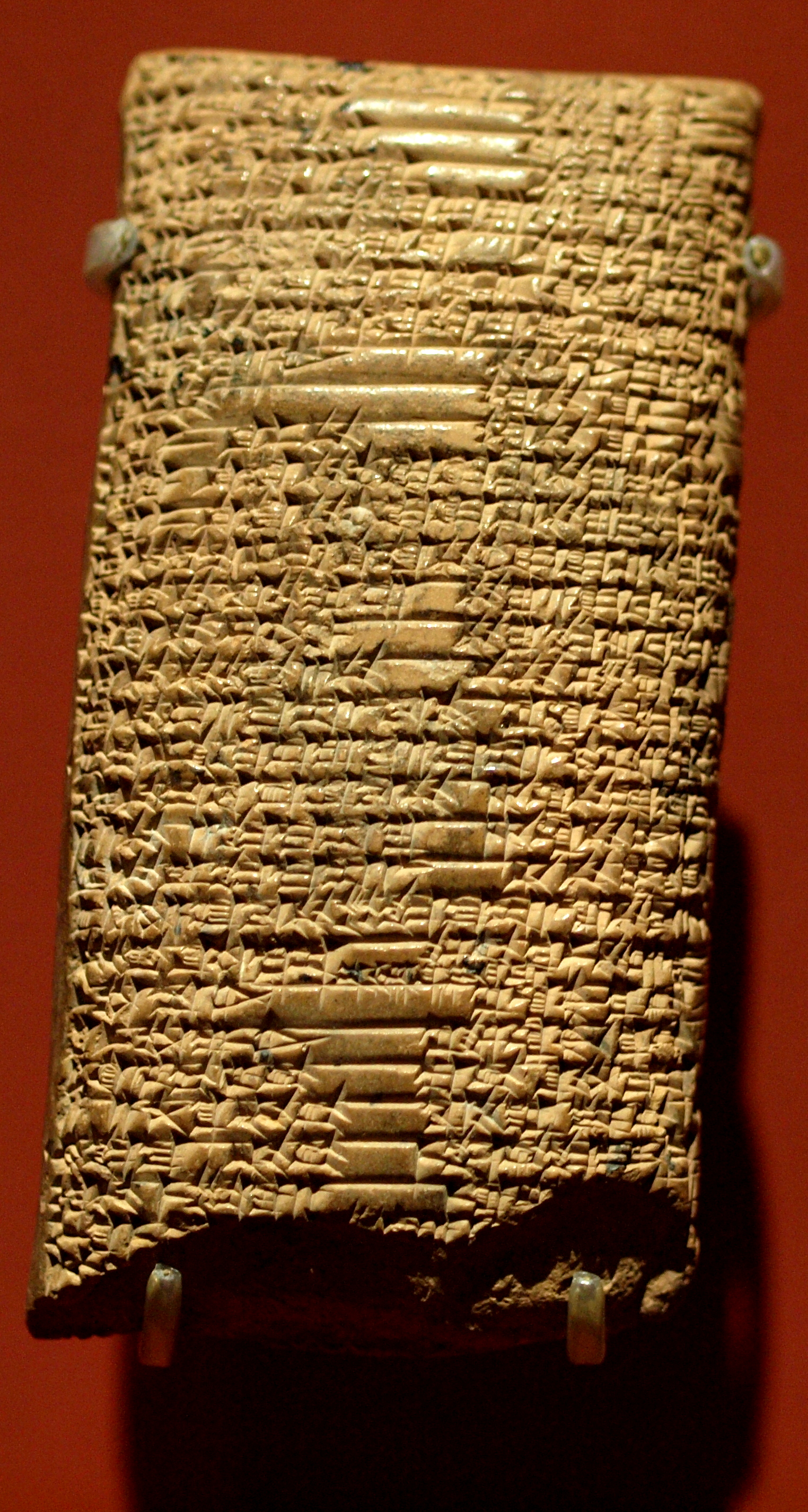
An Old Babylonian tablet inscribed with a lamentation over the death of Dumuzi, currently in the collection of Louvre Museum

Geshtinanna commonly appears in compositions about the death of Dumuzi, where she is one of the three most frequently recurring mourning goddesses, next to Inanna and Duttur. Occasionally she also appears in texts about the death of other similar gods, for example Damu, normally mourned by his mother Ninisina and sister Gunura instead.

=== Dumuzi's Dream ===
In Dumuzi's Dream, Geshtinanna interprets the eponymous dream and informs Dumuzi that it foretells his death. She refers to the assailants as bandits, indicating that in this composition belonged to the tradition in which Dumuzi's death was caused by an attack of evil men, rather than any events pertaining to Inanna. However, Geshtinanna also identifies the attackers as galla. It is possible she uses the term in its historical, rather than mythical, sense, which is supported by the description of the assailants as inhabitants of specific Mesopotamian cities, though it is also possible that a secondary source used by the compiler belonged to a tradition involving demons of the underworld. The historical galla were most likely officials of the judiciary, possibly analogous to policemen or deputies, but in literary texts they can be described not only as agents of law, as bandits and finally as demons. While Dumuzi is in hiding, Geshtinanna and her adviser Geshtindudu wait for the galla to arrive to warn him. Later the galla try to bribe her to offer them information about Dumuzi's whereabouts, but she refuses. They leave her alone and instead approach Dumuzi's unnamed friend instead. While with the help of Utu and Belili Dumuzi manages to escape them for a time, they eventually catch him when he returns to Geshtinanna's sheepfold.

=== Dumuzi and Geshtinanna ===
Another myth involving Geshtinanna is Dumuzi and Geshtinanna, though Dina Katz remarks that despite its conventional title this text focuses chiefly on the galla and the roles of Geshtinanna, Dumuzi, and Inanna are passive. Dumuzi hides in Geshtinanna's dwelling after being offered as a substitute to the galla by Inanna, who in this case was apparently approached by the demons in Uruk and handed her husband over out of fear. The galla torture Geshtinanna, but she refuses to disclose her brother's location. Katz points out that some elements of this myth overlap with Inanna's Descent, but the similarity is limited, because the "journey to the netherworld is twisted and presented as a conspiracy of the galla to dispatch [Inanna] there against her will." Furthermore, the account of Geshtinanna's torture finds no parallel in any other text.

=== Other myths ===
In Inanna's Descent to the Underworld, Geshtinanna is not addressed by name, but it is assumed that she eventually replaces Dumuzi for half of each year in the underworld, where he was himself placed as a replacement for Inanna.

Geshtinanna also appears in the fragmentary myth Dumuzi and his sisters, which has been compared to various compositions focused on Ningishzida. It involves two sisters, one younger and one older, mourning Dumuzi, who was seized by demons. Geshtinanna, the younger sister, mentions her attempts at confronting one of the captors and pours a funerary libation for her brother, though she eventually concludes this is in vain because he will not be able to receive it.

According to Wilfred G. Lambert, it is possible that a goddess named Ningestinna known from the late myth Theogony of Dunnu corresponds to Geshtinanna. The name of the deity she is paired with is not preserved, and due to the unusual nature of this text it is possible that he was not one of the gods usually associated with her.
