= Belili =

Mesopotamian goddess

- Major cult center: Bad-tibira, Babylon

Genealogy
- Parents: Duttur (mother)
- Siblings: Dumuzi, Geshtinanna
- Spouse: Alala

Belili (Sumerian: 𒀭𒁁𒇷𒇷, ^{d}be-li-li), was a Mesopotamian goddess. This name refers both to a sister of Dumuzi known from some of the texts pertaining to his death, and to a primordial deity paired with Alala and listed in enumerations of ancestors of Anu. There is no consensus among researchers if they should be considered one and the same.

== Name ==
Belili's name has no plausible etymology in Sumerian or any Semitic language, and based on its structure it has been compared to other divine names whose origin also remains a mystery, such as Alala, Aruru, Bunene and Zababa. Belili is also attested as an ordinary given name, one of the so-called banana names known from both Mesopotamia and Elam. Names with this structure are particularly common in the earliest Akkadian documents from Gasur (later known as Nuzi). It has been proposed that such names, both divine and ordinary, originate in a substrate language (so-called "proto-Euphratic"), but this conclusion is not universally accepted, and Gonzalo Rubio points out that they might simply represent a naming pattern among speakers of Akkadian. Manfred Krebernik suggests that they were a type of hypocorism (pet name).

The proposal that the theonym Belili was a contracted or corrupted form of the epithet Belet-ili is regarded as baseless today.

== Character ==
Belili appears in two distinct roles in Mesopotamian texts, as a sister of Dumuzi and as a primordial deity counted among the ancestors of Anu. Andrew R. George and Wilfred G. Lambert consider the sister of Dumuzi and the ancestor of Anu to be the same goddess. However, according to Manfred Krebernik, it is uncertain if Belili the sister of Dumuzi and Belili the primordial deity were related in any way.

=== Sister of Dumuzi ===
An explicit reference to the Belili as Dumuzi's sister is only present in the myth Ishtar's Descent, though they appear together in other texts as well. Other deities considered to be Dumuzi's relatives were Geshtinanna, well attested as his sister, and their mother Duttur. Belili is described as a mourner in the incantation series Šurpu, which might be a reference to her relation to Dumuzi.

It has been argued that similar to Belet-Seri, Belili was understood as the Akkadian counterpart of Geshtinanna. However, Manfred Krebernik considers Belili and Gesthinanna to be two independent goddesses each of whom could be described as Dumuzi's sister. Furthermore, both of them appear in separate roles in the myth Dumuzi's Dream.

=== Primordial deity ===
In lists of the sky god Anu's ancestors, Belili was typically paired with Alala, and together they occupy the final place in multiple documents enumerating such deities. This most likely indicates they could be regarded as Anu's parents. In the incantation series Udug Hul they appear in an enumeration of primeval deities: "Dūri, Dāri; Laḫmu, Laḫamu; Engur, Ningarra; Alāla; Bēlili". A single god list (K 4349) equates them with each other. According to Andrew R. George, this pair is also present in an unpublished hymn dedicated to the city of Borsippa. However, they were not associated with each other in other contexts, and according to Wilfred G. Lambert it is possible that they only came to be regarded as a couple because of both of their names being iterative.

== Worship ==
Belili was commonly worshiped alongside Dumuzi. E-Arali (Sumerian: "house, netherworld"), a well known shrine dedicated to this god located in his cult center Bad-tibira, also occurs as a location dedicated to Belili in the Canonical Temple List. Another temple dedicated to both of them was the E-erra (Sumerian: "house of lament"), though its location is unknown.

A temple dedicated to Belili, the Ekadimma, was located in Babylon. In a single administrative text it is paired with a sparsely attested temple of Shara for unknown reasons. Andrew R. George used its absence from the Canonical temple List to estimate the date of this document's composition as the second half of the Kassite period, since it postdates the foundation of Dur-Kurigalzu, but makes no mention of temples commonly listed in sources from Babylonia and Assyria from the late second and first millennium BCE, postdating the fall of the Kassite dynasty. Belili was also worshiped in Esagil complex, in this case sharing a cultic seat with Alala.

Some temples dedicated to Belili alone are also known from the Canonical Temple List, but their locations are unknown. They include the E-TIN-na, possibly to be read as Ekurunna, "house of liquor", and the Euruku, "house, pure city".

== Mythology ==
Belili is attested in a number of literary texts dealing with the death of Dumuzi. In Dumuzi's Dream, Dumuzi wants to hide in her house while being chased by demons. Belili agrees and offers him water, but later she has to leave, which lets the pursuers enter her house and take Dumuzi to the underworld. She is described as an old woman. Geshtinanna appears in the same myth in a different role. In Ishtar's Descent, a late Akkadian reinterpretation of an earlier Sumerian myth, Belili listens to the laments heard when Dumuzi dies and has to enter the underworld. The term used to describe these sounds is ikkillu, "an inarticulate cry expressing suffering of high intensity".

In the Desert by the Early Grass, a collection of laments dedicated to temporarily dying gods mourned by their respective mothers or sisters, mentions Belili alongside Amashilama, Ninazimua, Geshtinanna and three deities whose names are not preserved.
