= Dumuzid =

Sumerian god

- God of shepherds and fertility
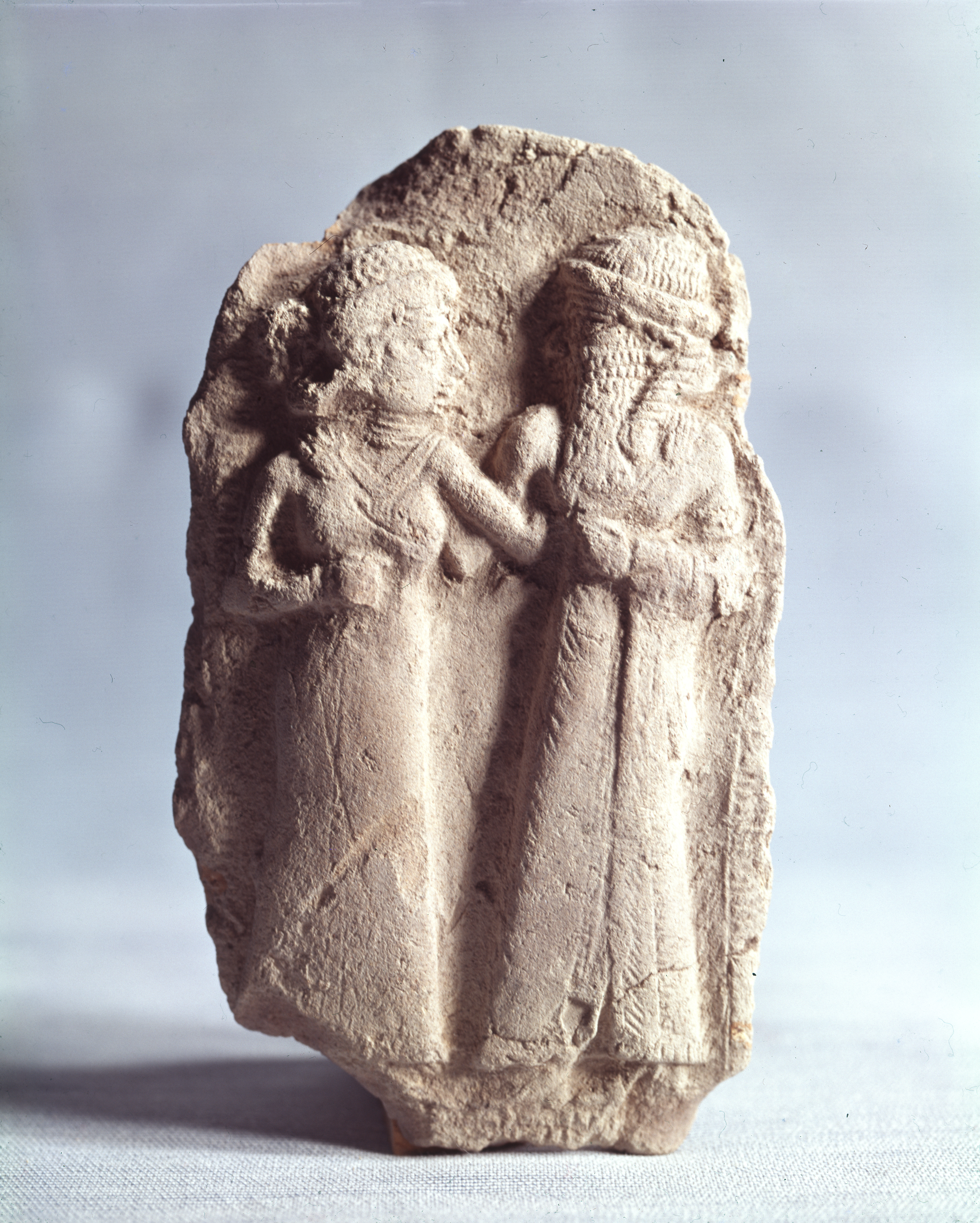
- Ancient Sumerian depiction of the marriage of Inanna and Dumuzid
- Abode: Heaven (for half the year); Kur (for the other half)

Genealogy
- Parents: Enki and Duttur
- Siblings: Geshtinanna (sister), Amashilama (not usually, but in some texts said to be his sister)
- Consort: Inanna (later known as Ishtar)

Equivalents
- Greek: Adonis
- East Semitic: Tammuz
- Levantine: Tammuz/Adonis

Dumuzid, Dumuzi, or Tammuz (Sumerian: 𒌉𒍣, romanized: Dumuzid; Akkadian: Duʾūzu, Dûzu; Arabic: تمّوز, romanized: Tammuz, Tammūz; Hebrew: תַּמּוּז, romanized: Tammūz), (Note: Derived from the Sumerian words meaning "faithful son".) (Note: Syriac: ܬܵܡܘܿܙ, romanized: Tāmōz; Arabic: تمّوز, romanized: Tammūz) known to the Sumerians as Dumuzid the Shepherd (Sumerian: 𒌉𒍣𒉺𒇻, romanized: Dumuzid sipad) and to the Canaanites as Adon (Phoenician: 𐤀𐤃𐤍; Proto-Hebrew: 𐤀𐤃𐤍), is an ancient Mesopotamian and Levantine deity associated with agriculture and shepherds, who was also the first and primary consort of the goddess Inanna (later known as Ishtar). In Sumerian mythology, Dumuzid's sister was Geshtinanna, the goddess of agriculture, fertility, and dream interpretation. In the Sumerian King List, Dumuzid is listed as an antediluvian king of the city of Bad-tibira and also an early king of the city of Uruk.

In Inanna's Descent into the Underworld, Inanna perceives that Dumuzid has failed to properly mourn her death and, when she returns from the Underworld, allows the galla demons to drag him down to the Underworld as her replacement. Inanna later regrets this decision and decrees that Dumuzid will spend half of the year in the Underworld, but the other half of the year with her, while his sister Geshtinanna stays in the Underworld in his place, thus resulting in the cycle of the seasons. In the Sumerian poem Inanna Prefers the Farmer, Dumuzid competes against the farmer Enkimdu for Inanna's hand in marriage.

Gilgamesh references Tammuz in Tablet VI of the Epic of Gilgamesh as the love of Ishtar's youth, who was turned into an allalu bird with a broken wing. Dumuzid was associated with fertility and vegetation and the hot, dry summers of Mesopotamia were believed to be caused by Dumuzid's yearly death. During the month in midsummer bearing his name, people all across Mesopotamia would engage in public, ritual mourning for him. The cult of Dumuzid later spread to the Levant and to Greece, where he became known under the West Semitic name Adonis.

Tammuz is mentioned by name in the Book of Ezekiel (e.g., Ezek. 8:14–15) and possibly alluded to in other passages from the Hebrew Bible. In late nineteenth and early twentieth century scholarship of religion, Tammuz was widely seen as a prime example of the archetypal dying-and-rising god, but the discovery of the full Sumerian text of Inanna's Descent in the mid-twentieth century appeared to disprove the previous scholarly assumption that the narrative ended with Dumuzid's resurrection and instead revealed that it ended with Dumuzid's death. However, the rescue of Dumuzid from the underworld was later found in the text Return of Dumuzid, translated in 1963.

== Worship ==
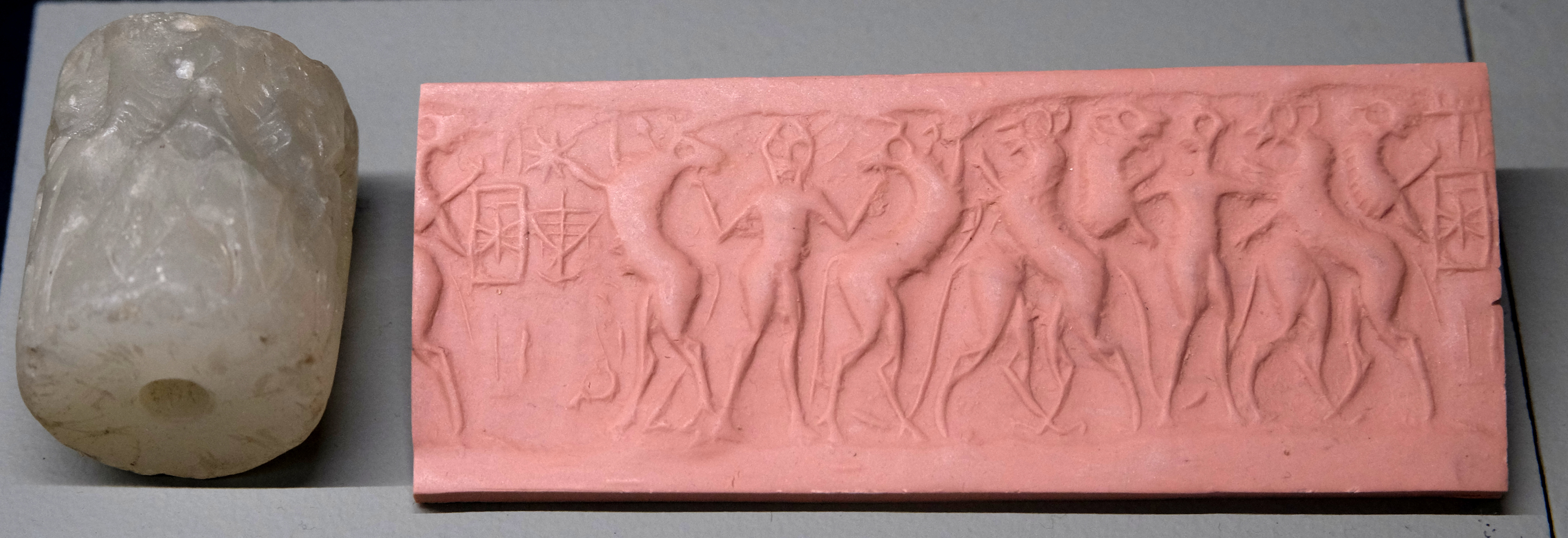
A bull man fighting four quadrupeds. Inscription "Ama-Ushumgal" (𒀭𒂼𒃲𒁔 ^{d}ama-ušumgal), namesake of the mythical king or shepherd Dumuzi. Early Dynastic II, circa 2600 BC. Royal Museums of Art and History - Brussels.

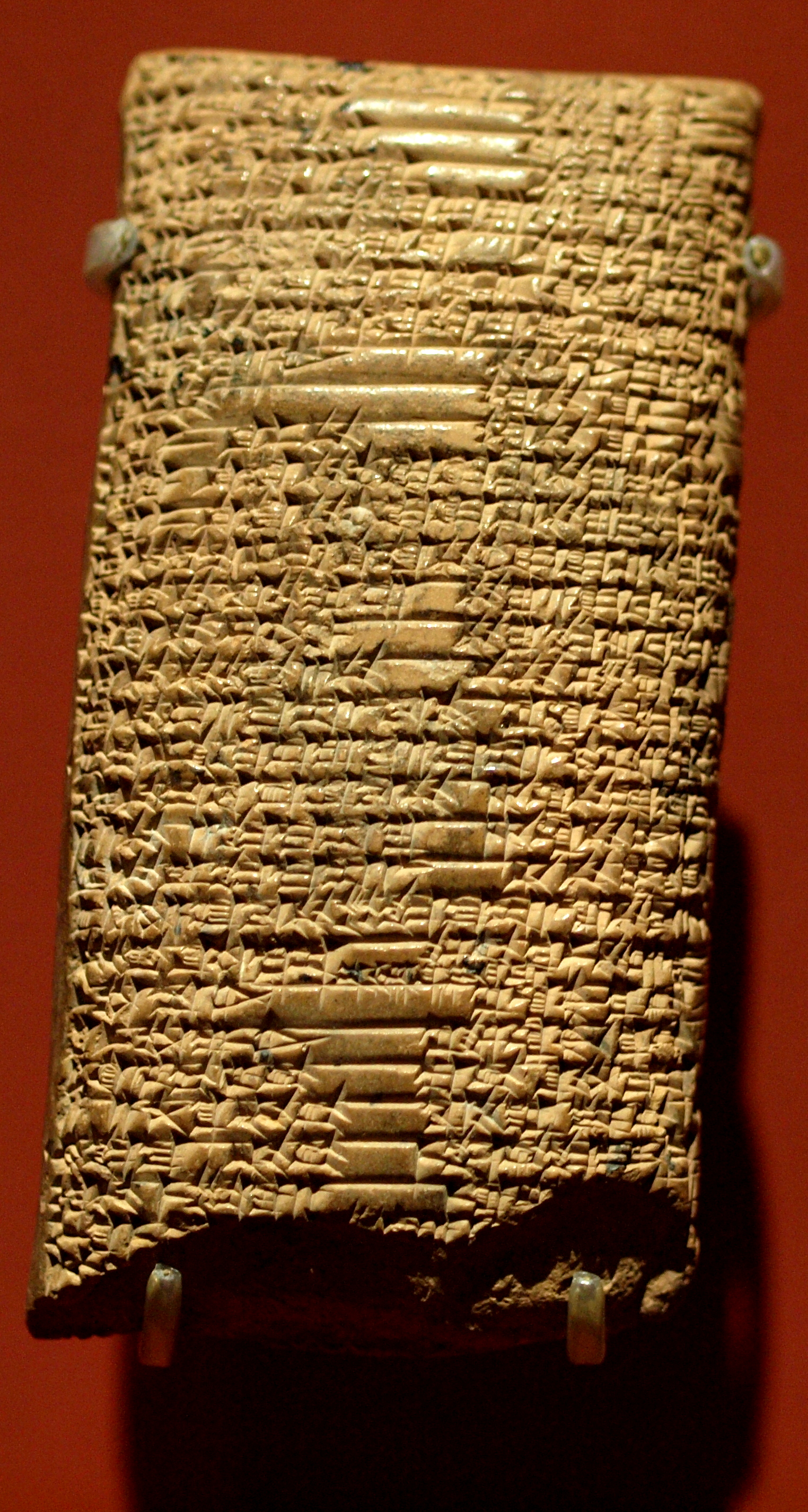
Ancient Mesopotamian clay tablet dating to the Amorite Period (c. 2000-1600 BC), containing a lamentation over the death of Dumuzid, currently held in the Louvre Museum in Paris

=== God of milk and shepherds ===
The Assyriologists Jeremy Black and Anthony Green describe the early history of Dumuzid's cult as "complex and bewildering". According to the Sumerian King List (ETCSL 2.1.1), Dumuzid was the fifth antediluvian king of the city of Bad-tibira. As Dumuzid sipad ("Dumuzid the Shepherd"), Dumuzid was believed to be the provider of milk, which was a rare, seasonal commodity in ancient Sumer due to the fact that it could not easily be stored without spoiling. Another Dumuzid, called "the Fisherman", was listed as an early king of Uruk, where he was said to have come from the nearby village of Kuara and to have been the consort of the goddess Inanna.

=== Plant-growing deity ===
In addition to being the god of shepherds, Dumuzid was also an agricultural deity associated with the growth of plants. Ancient Near Eastern peoples associated Dumuzid with the springtime, when the land was fertile and abundant, but, during the summer months, when the land was dry and barren, it was thought that Dumuzid had "died". During the month of Dumuzid, which fell in the middle of summer, people all across Sumer would mourn over his death. This seems to have been the primary aspect of his cult. In Lagash, the month of Dumuzid was the sixth month of the year. This month and the holiday associated with it was later transmitted from the Sumerians to Babylonians and other East Semitic peoples, with its name transcribed into those languages as Tammuz. A ritual associated with the Ekur temple in Nippur equates Dumuzid with the snake-god Ištaran, who in that ritual, is described as having died.

=== Association with date palms ===
Dumuzid was also identified with the god Ama-ušumgal-ana (𒀭𒂼𒃲𒁔𒀭𒈾 ^{d}ama-ušumgal-an-na), who was originally a local god worshipped in the city of Lagash. In some texts, Ama-ušumgal-ana is described as a heroic warrior. As Ama-ušumgal-ana, Dumuzid is associated with the date palm and its fruits. This aspect of Dumuzid's cult was always joyful in character and had no associations with the darker stories involving his death. To ancient Mesopotamian peoples, the date palm represented stability, because it was one of the few crops that could be harvested all year, even during the dry season. However, the interpretation of Ama-ušumgal-ana as referring to the date palm is disputed. See "Tammuz" in Dictionary of Deities and Demons in the Bible. In some Sumerian poems, Dumuzid is referred to as "my Damu", which means "my son". This name is usually applied to him in his role as the personification of the power that causes the sap to rise in trees and plants. Damu is the name most closely associated with Dumuzid's return in autumn after the dry season has ended. This aspect of his cult emphasized the fear and exhaustion of the community after surviving the devastating summer.

=== Exchange with other near east religions ===
Dumuzid had virtually no power outside of his distinct realm of responsibilities. Very few prayers addressed to him are extant and, of those that are, almost all of them are simply requests for him to provide more milk, more grain, more cattle, etc. The sole exception to this rule is a single Assyrian inscription in which a man requests Tammuz that, when he descends to the Underworld, he should take with him a troublesome ghost who has been haunting him. The cult of Tammuz was particularly associated with women, who were the ones responsible for mourning his death.

The custom of planting miniature gardens with fast-growing plants such as lettuce and fennel, which would then be placed out in the hot sun to sprout before withering in the heat, was a well-attested custom in ancient Greece associated with the festival of Adonia in honor of Adonis, the Greek version of Tammuz; some scholars have argued based on references in the Hebrew Bible that this custom may have been a continuation of an earlier oriental practice. The same women who mourned the death of Tammuz also prepared cakes for his consort Ishtar, the Queen of Heaven. These cakes would be baked in ashes and several clay cake molds discovered at Mari, Syria reveal that they were also at least sometimes shaped like naked women.

=== Role in sacred marriage ===
According to the scholar Samuel Noah Kramer, towards the end of the third millennium BC, kings of Uruk may have established their legitimacy by taking on the role of Dumuzid as part of a "sacred marriage" ceremony. This ritual lasted for one night on the tenth day of the Akitu, the Sumerian new year festival, which was celebrated annually at the spring equinox. As part of the ritual, it was thought that the king would engage in ritualized sexual intercourse with the high priestess of Inanna, who took on the role of the goddess. In the late twentieth century, the historicity of the sacred marriage ritual was treated by scholars as more-or-less an established fact, but in recent years, largely due to the writings of Pirjo Lapinkivi, some scholars have rejected the notion of an actual sex ritual, instead seeing "sacred marriage" as a symbolic rather than a physical union.

== Mythology ==
=== Sumerian ===
==== Marriage to Inanna ====
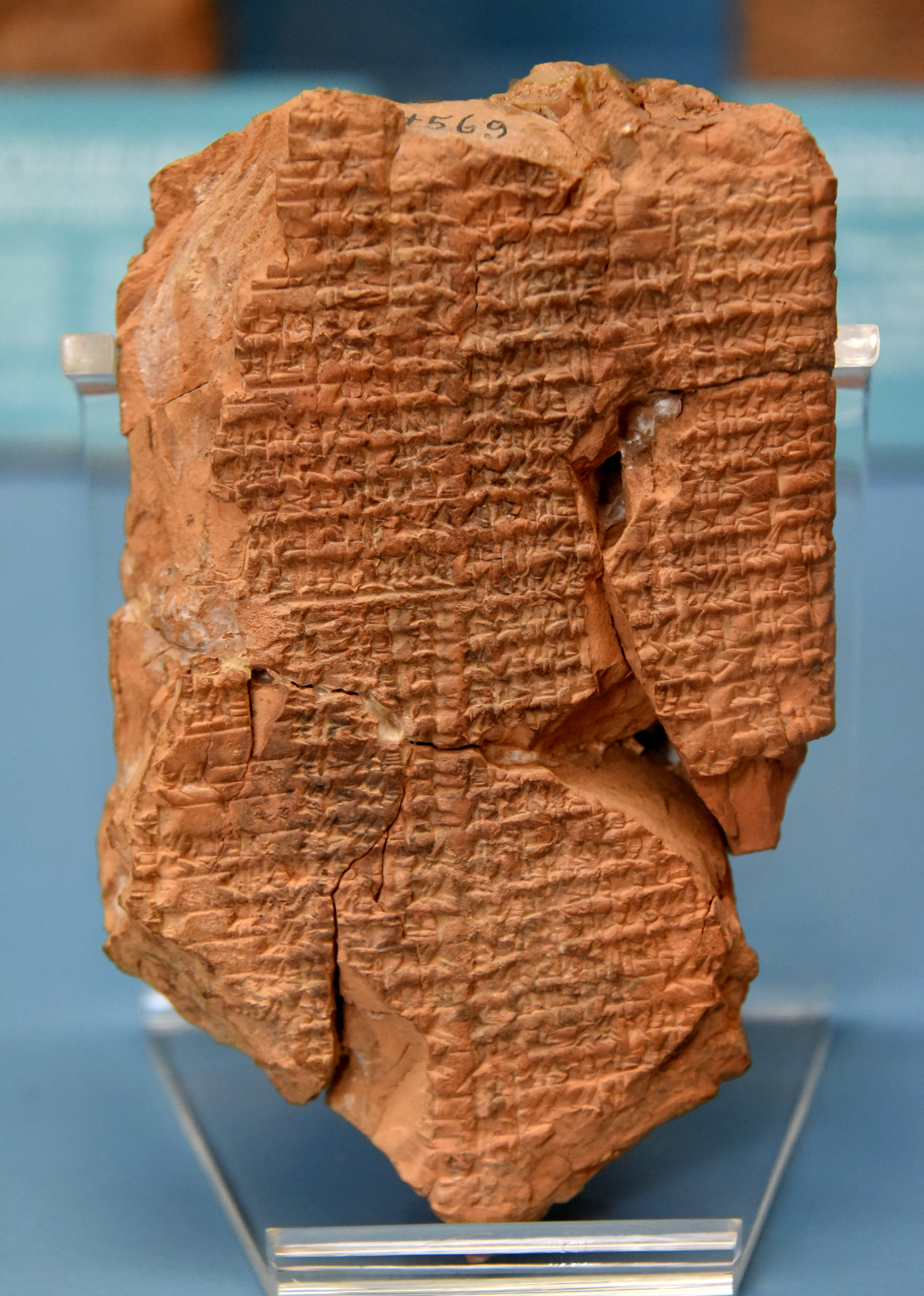
Original Sumerian tablet of the Courtship of Inanna and Dumuzid

The poem "Inanna Prefers the Farmer" (ETCSL 4.0.8.3.3) begins with a rather playful conversation between Inanna and her brother Utu, who incrementally reveals to her that it is time for her to marry. Dumuzid comes to court her, along with a farmer named Enkimdu. At first, Inanna prefers the farmer, but Utu and Dumuzid gradually persuade her that Dumuzid is the better choice for a husband, arguing that, for every gift the farmer can give to her, the shepherd can give her something even better. In the end, Inanna marries Dumuzid. The shepherd and the farmer reconcile their differences, offering each other gifts. Samuel Noah Kramer compares the myth to the Biblical story of Cain and Abel because both accounts center around a farmer and a shepherd competing for divine favor and, in both stories, the deity in question ultimately chooses the shepherd.

A vast number of erotic love poems celebrating the consummation of Inanna and Dumuzid have survived. Two excerpts from a representative example are translated below:

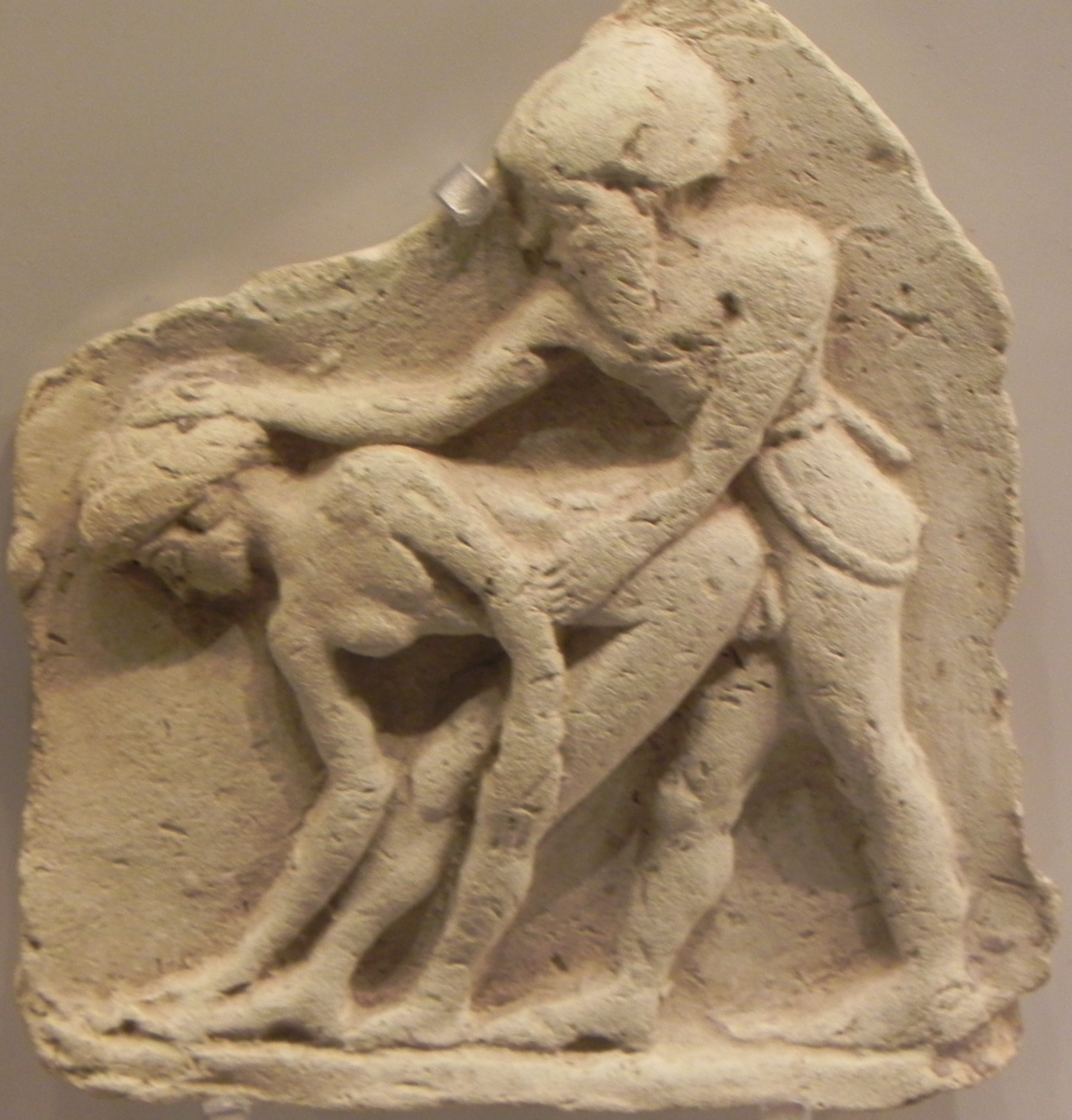
Erotic terracotta votive plaque dating to the Old Babylonian Period (c. 1830 BC — c. 1531). Representations of this type were once interpreted as evidence for a "sacred marriage" ritual in which the king would take on the role of Dumuzid and engage in sexual intercourse with the priestess of Inanna. This interpretation is now generally seen as a misinterpretation of Sumerian literary texts.

Transliterated Sumerian text (ETCSL 4.08.16)

gal_{4}-la jar-ra^{?} ne-en GAG X [...]
si-gin_{7} ^{jic}mar gal-e /kece_{2}\ [...]
ma_{2} an-na ne-en ec_{2} la_{2} [...]
ud-sakar gibil-gin_{7} hi-li /gur3\-[ru-ju_{10}]
kislah ne-en edin-na cub^{?}-[...]
a-cag_{4}? uz^{mucen} ne-en uz^{mucen} dur_{2}-[ra]-/ju_{10}\
a-cag_{4} an-na ne-en a ma-ra-ju_{10}
ma-a gal_{4}-la-ju_{10} du_{6} du_{8}-du_{8}-a a ma-«a»-ra
ki-sikil-jen a-ba-a ur_{11}-ru-a-bi
gal_{4}-la-ju_{10} ki duru_{5} a ma-ra
ga-ca-an-jen gud a-ba-a bi_{2}-ib_{2}-gub-be_{2}
...
ga sig_{7}-a-ma-ab mu-ud-na-ju_{10} ga sig_{7}-/a\-[ma-ab]
mu-ud-na-ju_{10} me-e ga de_{3}-e-da-/na_{8}\-[na_{8}]
am ^{d}dumu-zid ga sig_{7}-a-ma-/ab\
mu-ud-na-ju_{10} me-e ga de_{3}-/e-da\-[na_{8}-na_{8}]
ga ud_{5}-da-ke_{4} amac [...]
nin car_{2}-ra dugcakir kug-ja_{2} sug_{4}-[...]
^{d}dumu-zid ga am-si-har-ra-/an\-[na ...]

English translation by Samuel Noah Kramer and Diane Wolkstein

My vulva, the horn,
The Boat of Heaven,
Is full of eagerness like the young moon.
My untilled land lies fallow.
As for me, Inanna,
Who will plow my vulva?
Who will plow my high field?
Who will plow my wet ground?
As for me, the young woman,
Who will plow my vulva?
Who will station the ox there?
Who will plow my vulva?
...
Make your milk sweet and thick, my bridegroom.
My shepherd, I will drink your fresh milk.
Wild bull, Dumuzi, make your milk sweet and thick.
I will drink your fresh milk.
Let the milk of the goat flow in my sheepfold.
Fill my holy churn with honey cheese.
Lord Dumuzi, I will drink your fresh milk.

==== Death ====
===== Main narrative =====
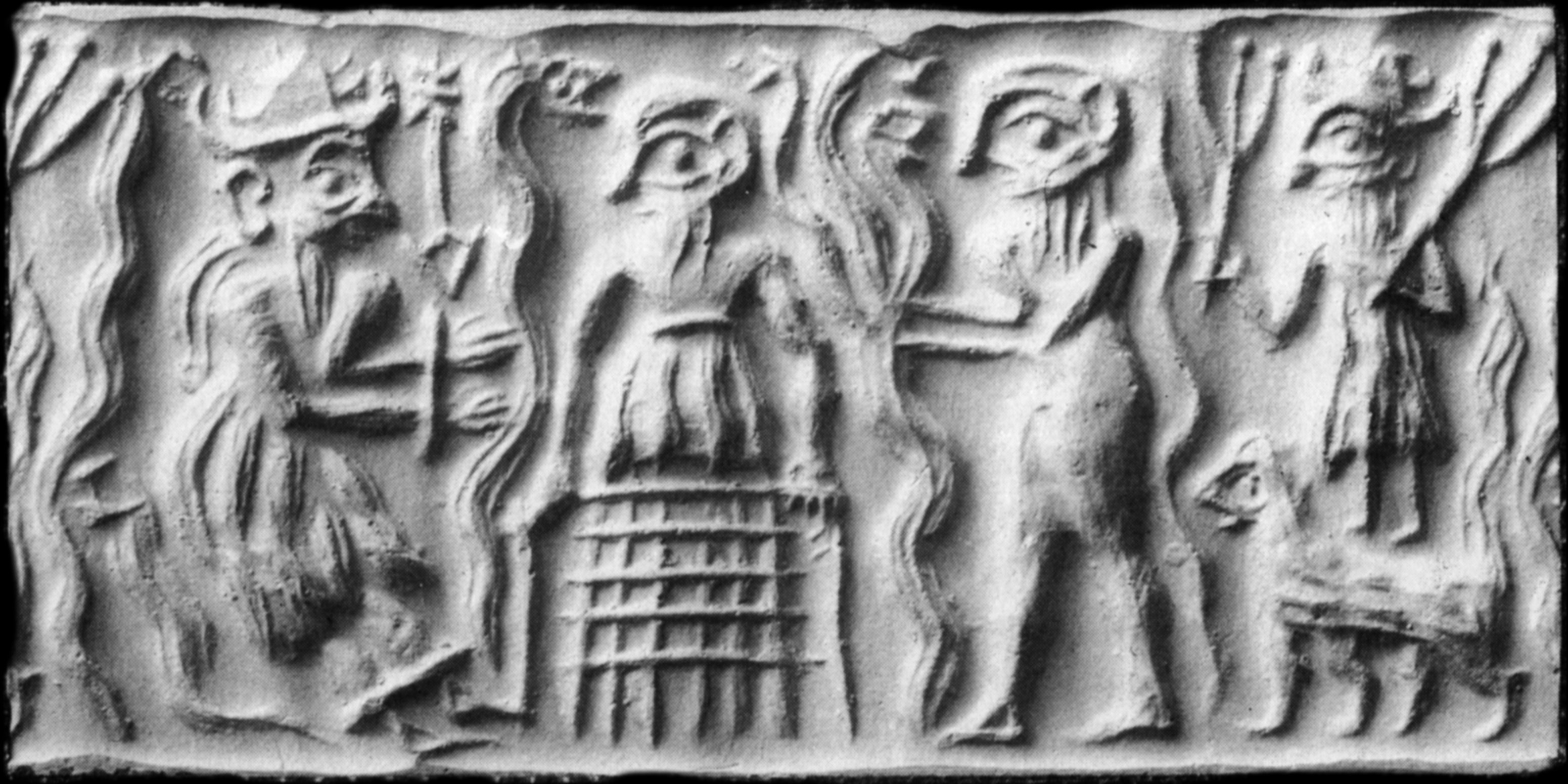
Ancient Sumerian cylinder seal impression showing Dumuzid being tortured in the Underworld by the galla demons

Towards the end of the epic poem Inanna's Descent into the Underworld (ETCSL 1.4.1), Dumuzid's wife Inanna escapes from the Underworld, but is pursued by a horde of galla demons, who insist that someone else must take her place in the Underworld. They first come upon Inanna's sukkal Ninshubur and attempt to take her, but Inanna stops them, insisting that Ninshubur is her loyal servant and that she had rightfully mourned for her while she was in the Underworld. They next come upon Shara, Inanna's beautician, who is still in mourning. The demons attempt to take him, but Inanna insists that they may not, because he had also mourned for her. The third person they come upon is Lulal, who is also in mourning. The demons try to take him, but Inanna stops them once again. Finally, they come upon Dumuzid, who is lavishly clothed and resting beneath a tree, or sitting on Inanna's throne, entertained by slave-girls. Inanna, displeased, decrees that the demons shall take him, using language which echoes the speech Ereshkigal gave while condemning her. The demons then drag Dumuzid down to the Underworld.

The Sumerian poem The Dream of Dumuzid (ETCSL 1.4.3) begins with Dumuzid telling Geshtinanna about a frightening dream he has experienced. (Note: Dumuzid's Dream is attested in seventy-five known sources, fifty-five of which come from Nippur, nine from Ur, three probably from the region around Sippar, one each from Uruk, Kish, Shaduppum, and Susa.) Then the galla demons arrive to drag Dumuzid down into the Underworld as Inanna's replacement. Dumuzid flees and hides. The galla demons brutally torture Geshtinanna in an attempt to force her to tell them where Dumuzid is hiding. Geshtinanna, however, refuses to tell them where her brother has gone. The galla go to Dumuzid's unnamed "friend", who betrays Dumuzid, telling the galla exactly where Dumuzid is hiding. The galla capture Dumuzid, but Utu, the god of the Sun, who is also Inanna's brother, rescues Dumuzid by transforming him into a gazelle. Eventually, the galla recapture Dumuzid and drag him down into the Underworld.

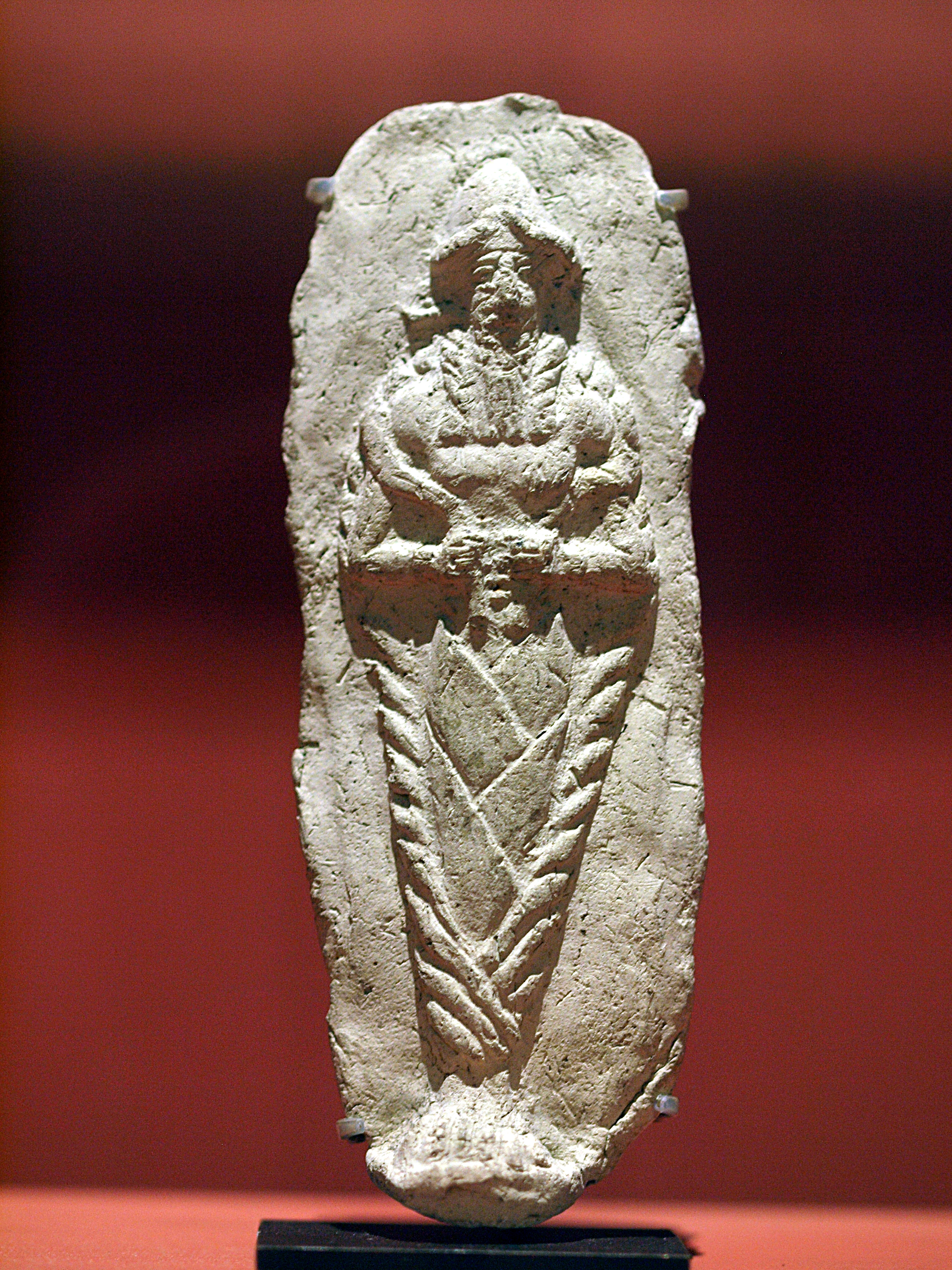
Terracotta plaque dating to the Amorite Period (c. 2000-1600 BC) showing a dead god (probably Dumuzid) resting in his coffin

In the Sumerian poem The Return of Dumuzid, which begins where The Dream of Dumuzid ends, Geshtinanna laments continually for days and nights over Dumuzid's death, joined by Inanna, who has apparently experienced a change of heart, and Sirtur, Dumuzid's mother. The three goddesses mourn continually until a fly reveals to Inanna the location of her husband. Together, Inanna and Geshtinanna go to the place where the fly has told them they will find Dumuzid. They find him there and Inanna decrees that, from that point onwards, Dumuzid will spend half of the year with her sister Ereshkigal in the Underworld and the other half of the year in Heaven with her, while Geshtinanna takes his place in the Underworld.

==== Other versions ====
Other texts describe different and contradictory accounts of Dumuzid's death. The text of the poem Inanna and Bilulu (ETCSL 1.4.4), discovered at Nippur, is badly mutilated and scholars have interpreted it in a number of different ways. The beginning of the poem is mostly destroyed, but seems to be a lament. The intelligible part of the poem describes Inanna pining after her husband Dumuzid, who is in the steppe watching his flocks. Inanna sets out to find him. After this, a large portion of the text is missing. When the story resumes, Inanna is told that Dumuzid has been murdered. Inanna discovers that the old bandit woman Bilulu and her son Girgire are responsible. She travels along the road to Edenlila and stops at an inn, where she finds the two murderers. Inanna stands on top of a stool and transforms Bilulu into "the waterskin that men carry in the desert", forcing her to pour the funerary libations for Dumuzid.

Dumuzid and Geshtinanna begins with demons encouraging Inanna to conquer the Underworld. Instead, she hands Dumuzid over to them. They put Dumuzid's feet, hands, and neck in the stocks and torture him using hot pokers. They strip him naked, do "evil" to him, and cover his face with his own garment. Finally, Dumuzid prays to Utu for help. Utu transforms Dumuzid into a creature that is part eagle and part snake, allowing him to escape back to Geshtinanna. In the text known as The Most Bitter Cry, Dumuzid is chased by the "seven evil deputies of the netherworld" and, as he is running, he falls into a river. Near an apple tree on the other bank, he is dragged into the Underworld, where everything simultaneously "exists" and "does not exist", perhaps indicating that they exist in insubstantial or immaterial forms.

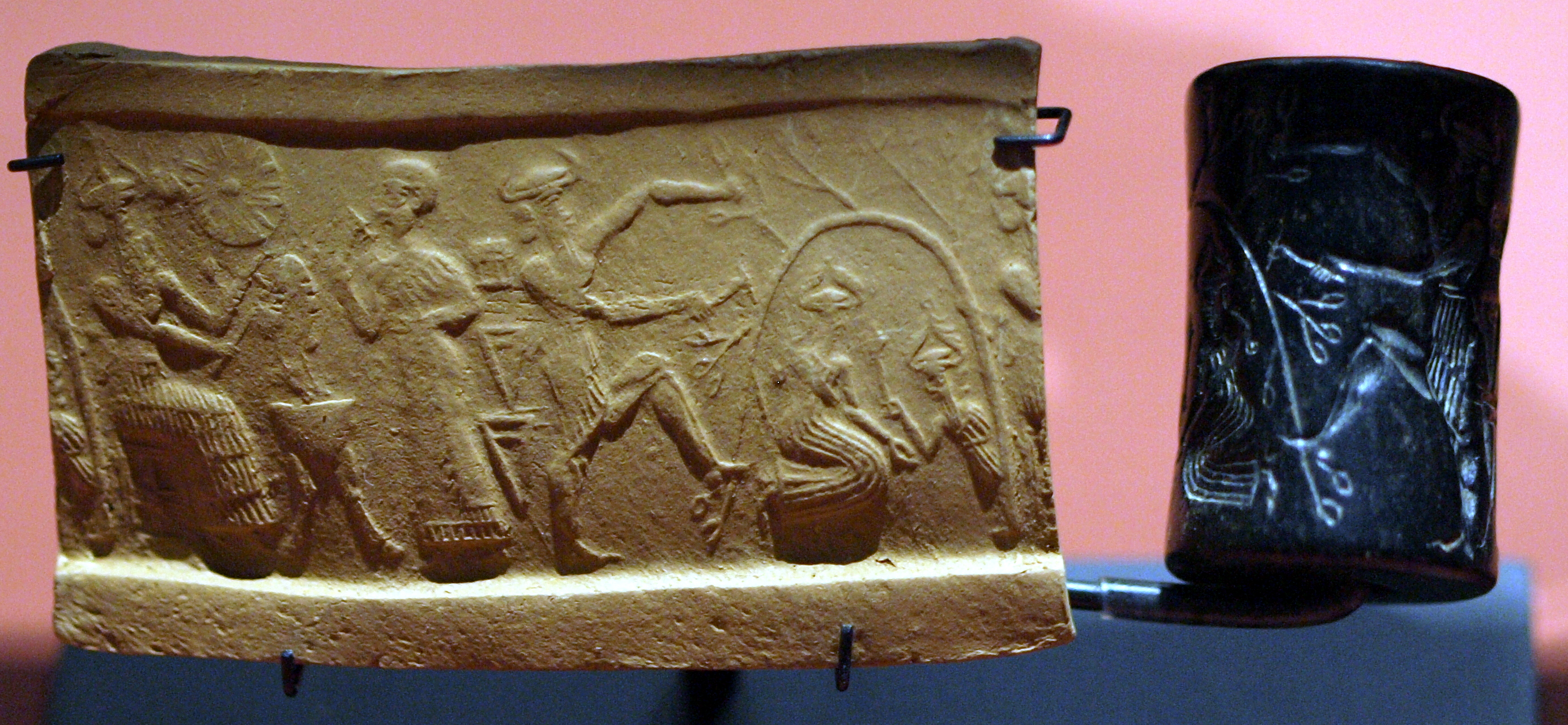
Akkadian cylinder seal impression from Girsu (c. 2340 - 2150 BC) showing a mythological scene. The figure in the center appears to be a god, perhaps Gilgamesh, who is bending the trunk of a tree into a curve as he chops it down. Underneath the tree, a god ascending from the Underworld, possibly Dumuzid, hands a mace-like object to a goddess, possibly Inanna or one of Dumuzid's female relatives.

A collection of lamentations for Dumuzid entitled In the Desert by the Early Grass describes Damu, the "dead anointed one", being dragged down to the Underworld by demons, who blindfold him, tie him up, and forbid him from sleeping. Damu's mother tries to follow him into the Underworld, but Damu is now a disembodied spirit, "lying in" the winds, "in the lightnings and in tornadoes". Damu's mother is also unable to eat the food or drink the water in the Underworld, because it is "bad". Damu travels along the road of the Underworld and encounters various spirits. He meets the ghost of a small child, who tells him that it is lost; the ghost of a singer agrees to accompany the child. Damu asks the spirits to send a message to his mother, but they cannot because they are dead and the living cannot hear the dead's voices. Damu, however, manages to tell his mother to dig up his blood and chop it into pieces. Damu's mother gives the congealed blood to Damu's sister Amashilama, who is a leech. Amashilama mixes the congealed blood into a brew of beer, which Damu must drink in order to be restored to life. Damu, however, realizes that he is dead and declares that he is not in the "grass which shall grow for his mother again", nor in the "waters which will rise". Damu's mother blesses him and Amashilama dies to join him in the Underworld. She tells him that "the day that dawns for you will also dawn for me; the day you see, I shall also see", referring to the fact that day in the world above is night in the Underworld.

=== Akkadian ===
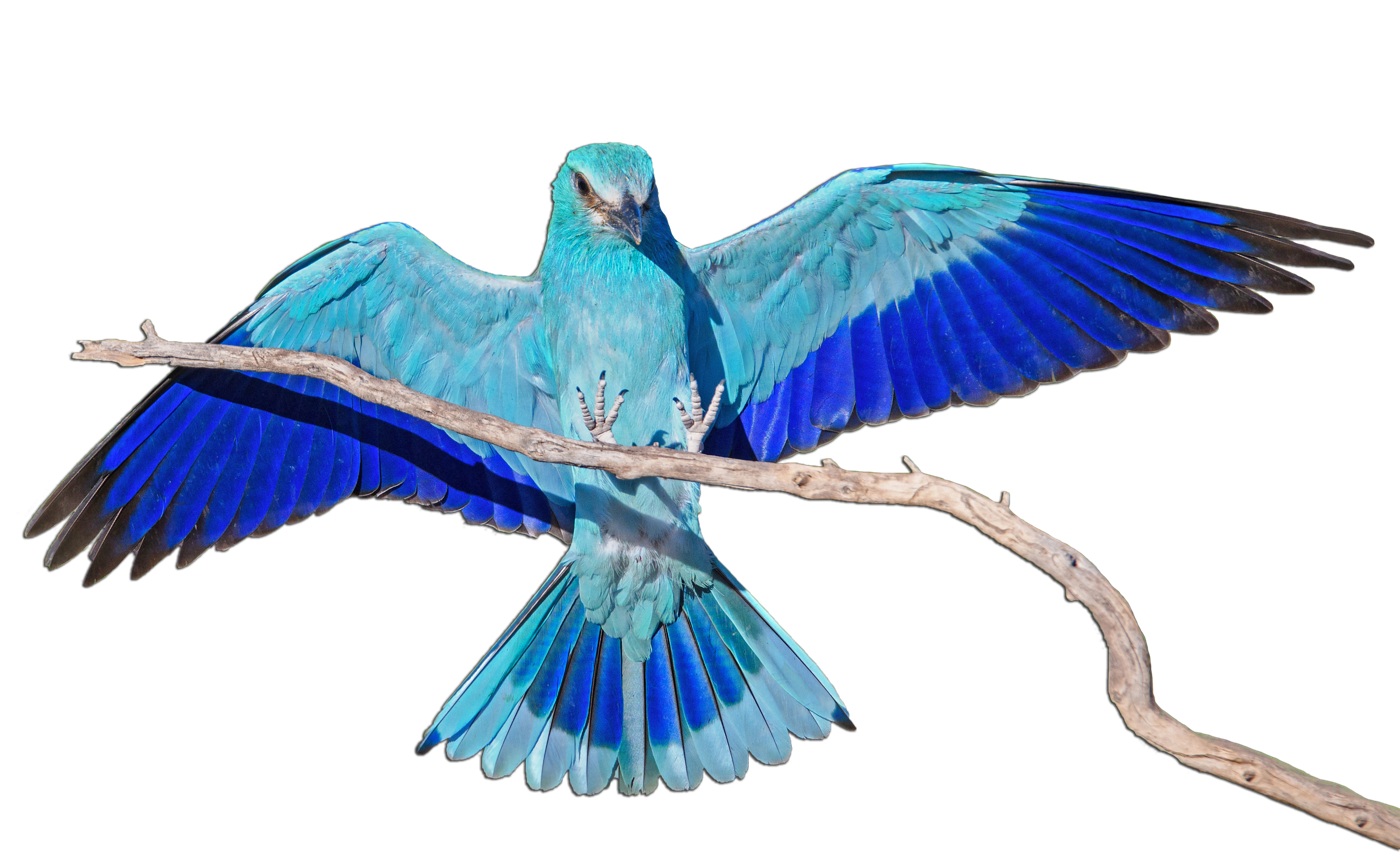
In the Akkadian Epic of Gilgamesh, Tammuz is described as a "colorful allalu bird", possibly a European roller

In the myth of Adapa, Dumuzid and Ningishzida are the two doorkeepers of Anu, the god of the heavens, who speak out in favor of Adapa, the priest of Ea, as he stands trial before Anu. In Tablet VI of the standard Akkadian Epic of Gilgamesh, Ishtar (Inanna) attempts to seduce the hero Gilgamesh, but he rebuffs her, reminding her that she had struck Tammuz (Dumuzid), "the lover of [her] youth", decreeing that he should "keep weeping year after year". Gilgamesh describes Tammuz as a colorful allalu bird (possibly a European or Indian roller), whose wing has been broken and now spends all his time "in the woods crying 'My wing!'" (Tablet VI, section ii, lines 11–15). Gilgamesh may be referring to an alternative account of Dumuzid's death, different from the ones recorded in extant texts.

Anton Moortgat has interpreted Dumuzid as the antithesis of Gilgamesh: Gilgamesh refuses Ishtar's demand for him to become her lover, seeks immortality, and fails to find it; Dumuzid, by contrast, accepts Ishtar's offer and, as a result of her love, is able to spend half the year in Heaven, even though he is condemned to the Underworld for the other half. Mehmet-Ali Ataç further argues that the "Tammuz model" of immortality was far more prevalent in the ancient Near East than the "Gilgamesh model". In a chart of antediluvian generations in Babylonian and Biblical traditions, William Hallo associates Dumuzid with the composite half-man, half-fish counselor or culture hero (Apkallu) An-Enlilda, and suggests an equivalence between Dumuzid and Enoch in the Sethite Genealogy given in Genesis chapter 5.

== Later worship ==
=== In the Bible ===
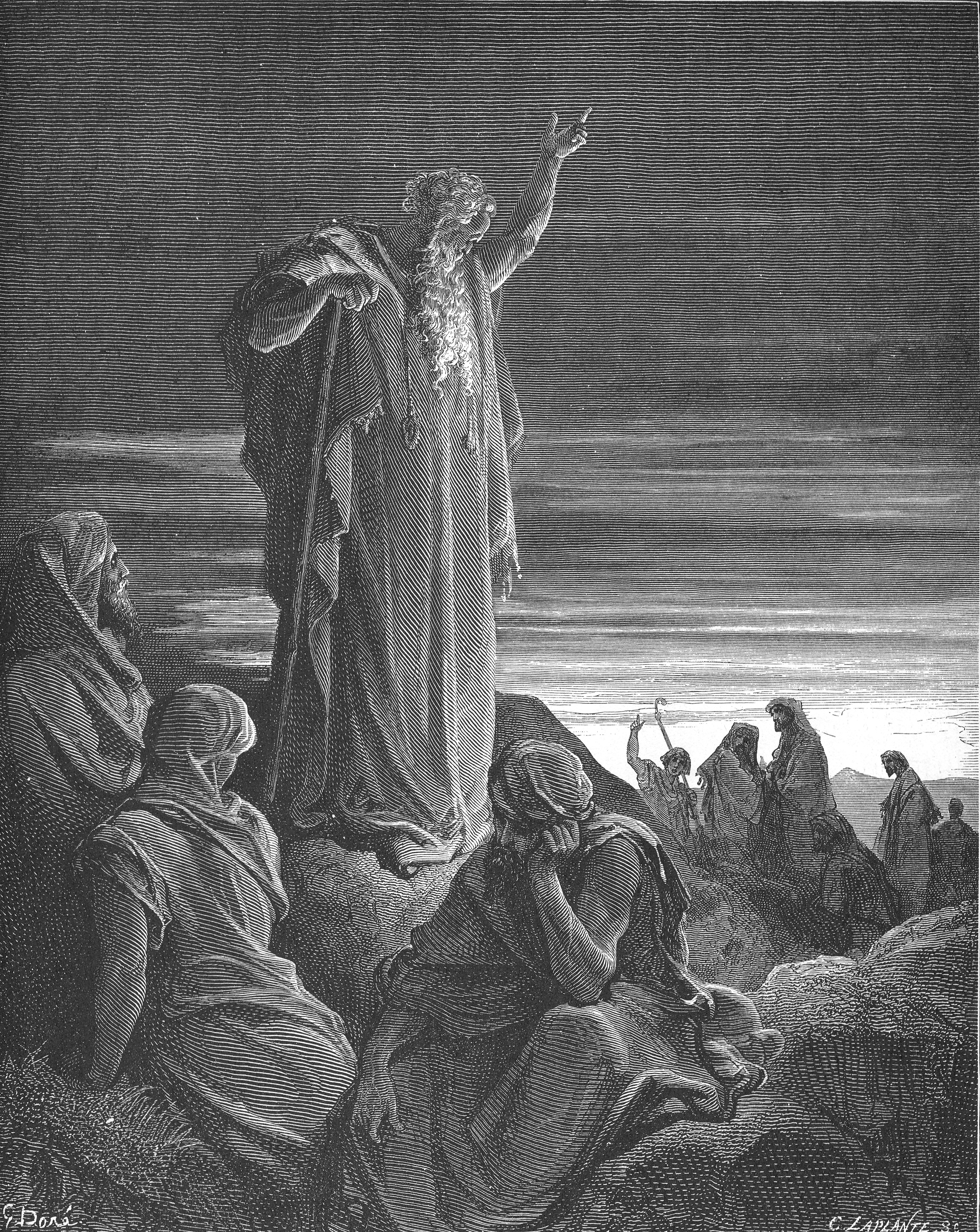
In Ezekiel 8:14, the prophet Ezekiel, shown here in this illustration from 1866 by Gustave Doré, witnesses women mourning the death of Tammuz outside the Temple in Jerusalem

The cult of Ishtar and Tammuz may have been introduced to the Kingdom of Judah during the reign of King Manasseh and the Old Testament contains numerous allusions to them. Ezekiel 8:14 mentions Tammuz by name: "Then he brought me to the door of the gate of the Lord's house which was toward the north; and, behold, there sat women weeping for Tammuz. Then said he unto to me, 'Hast thou seen this, O son of man? turn thee yet again, and thou shalt see greater abominations than these."

Ezekiel's testimony is the only direct mention of Tammuz in the Hebrew Bible, but the cult of Tammuz may also be alluded to in Isaiah 17:10–11:

Because thou hast forgotten the God of thy salvation, and hast not been mindful of the rock of thy strength, therefore shalt thou plant pleasant plants, and shalt set it with strange slips: In the day shalt thou make thy plant to grow, and in the morning shalt thou make thy seed to flourish: but the harvest shall be a heap in the day of grief and of desperate sorrow.

This passage may be describing the miniature gardens that women would plant in honor of Tammuz during his festival. Isaiah 1:29–30, Isaiah 65:3, and Isaiah 66:17 all denounce sacrifices made "in the gardens", which may also be connected to the cult of Tammuz. Another possible allusion to Tammuz occurs in Daniel 11:37: "Neither shall he regard the God of his fathers, nor the desire of women, nor regard any god: for he shall magnify himself above all." The subject of this passage is Antiochus IV Epiphanes and some scholars have interpreted the reference to the "one desired by women" in this passage as an indication that Antiochus may have persecuted the cult of Tammuz. There is no external evidence to support this reading, however, and it is much more probable that this epithet is merely a jibe at Antiochus's notorious cruelty towards all the women who fell in love with him.

The Hebrew Bible also contains references to Tammuz's consort Inanna/Ishtar. Jeremiah 7:18 and Jeremiah 44:15–19 mention "the Queen of Heaven", who is probably a syncretism of Inanna/Ishtar and the West Semitic goddess Astarte. The Song of Songs bears strong similarities to the Sumerian love poems involving Inanna and Dumuzid, particularly in its usage of natural symbolism to represent the lovers' physicality. Song of Songs 6:10 ("Who is she that looketh forth as the morning, fair as the moon, clear as the sun, and terrible as an army with banners?") is almost certainly a reference to Inanna/Ishtar.

=== Classical antiquity ===
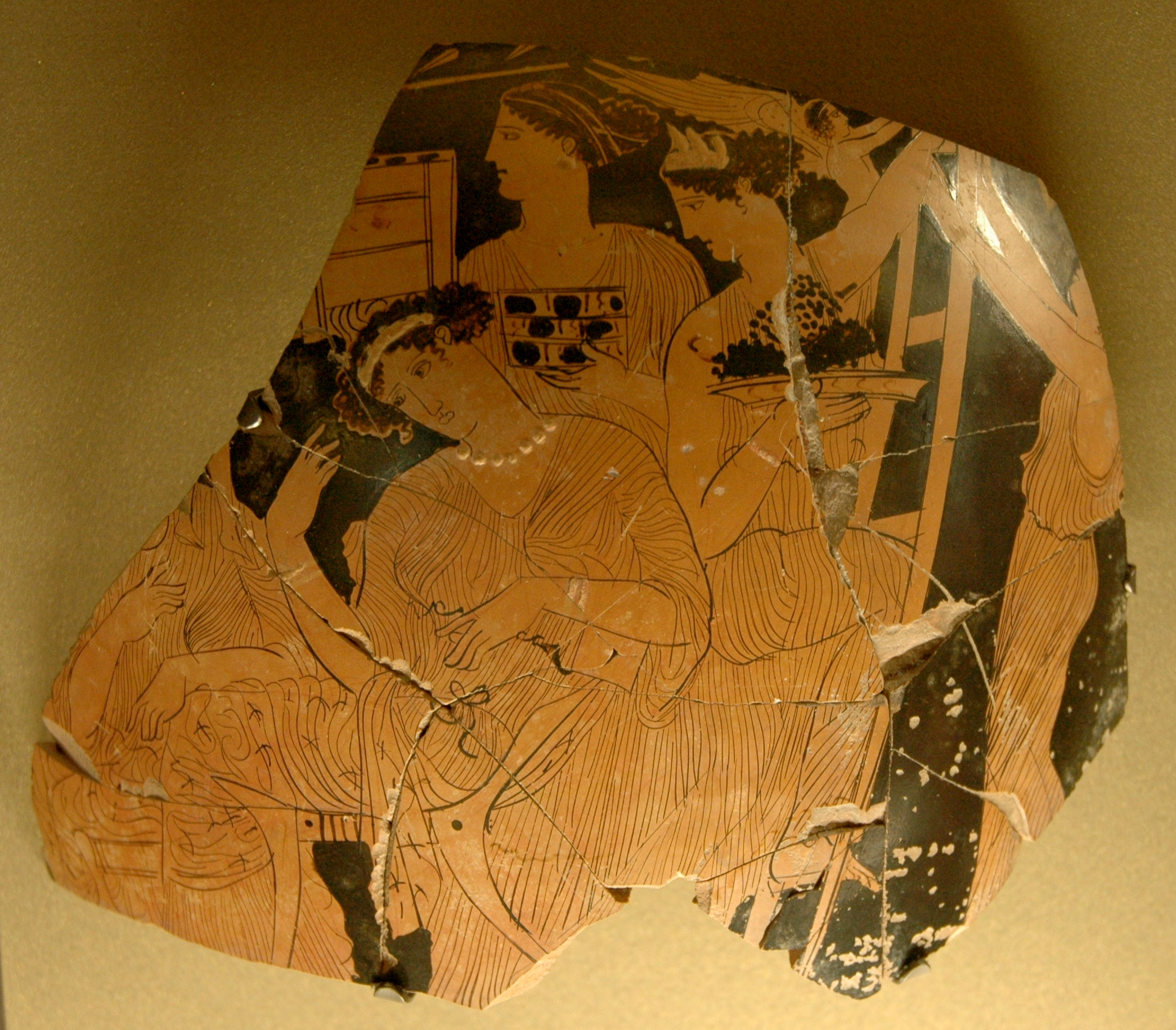
Fragment of an Attic red-figure wedding vase (c. 430-420 BC), showing women climbing ladders up to the roofs of their houses carrying "gardens of Adonis"

The myth of Inanna and Dumuzid later became the basis for the Greek myth of Aphrodite and Adonis. The Greek name Ἄδωνις (Adōnis, Greek pronunciation: [ádɔːnis]) is derived from the Canaanite word ʼadōn, meaning "lord". The earliest known Greek reference to Adonis comes from a fragment of a poem by the Lesbian poet Sappho, dating to the seventh century BC, in which a chorus of young girls asks Aphrodite what they can do to mourn Adonis's death. Aphrodite replies that they must beat their breasts and tear their tunics. Later recensions of the Adonis legend reveal that he was believed to have been slain by a wild boar during a hunting trip. According to Lucian's De Dea Syria, each year during the festival of Adonis, the Adonis River located in what is now Lebanon (renamed the Abraham River) ran red with blood.

In Greece, the myth of Adonis was associated with the festival of the Adonia, which was celebrated by Greek women every year in midsummer. The festival, which was evidently already celebrated in Lesbos by Sappho's time, seems to have first become popular in Athens in the mid-fifth century BC. At the start of the festival, the women would plant a "garden of Adonis", a small garden planted inside a small basket or a shallow piece of broken pottery containing a variety of quick-growing plants, such as lettuce and fennel, or even quick-sprouting grains such as wheat and barley. The women would then climb ladders to the roofs of their houses, where they would place the gardens out under the heat of the summer sun. The plants would sprout in the sunlight, but wither quickly in the heat. Then the women would mourn and lament loudly over the death of Adonis, tearing their clothes and beating their breasts in a public display of grief. The third century BC poet Euphorion of Chalcis remarked in his Hyacinth that "Only Cocytus washed the wounds of Adonis". (Note: Remarked upon in passing by Photius, Biblioteca 190 (on-line translation).)

=== Survival into the Christian Era ===
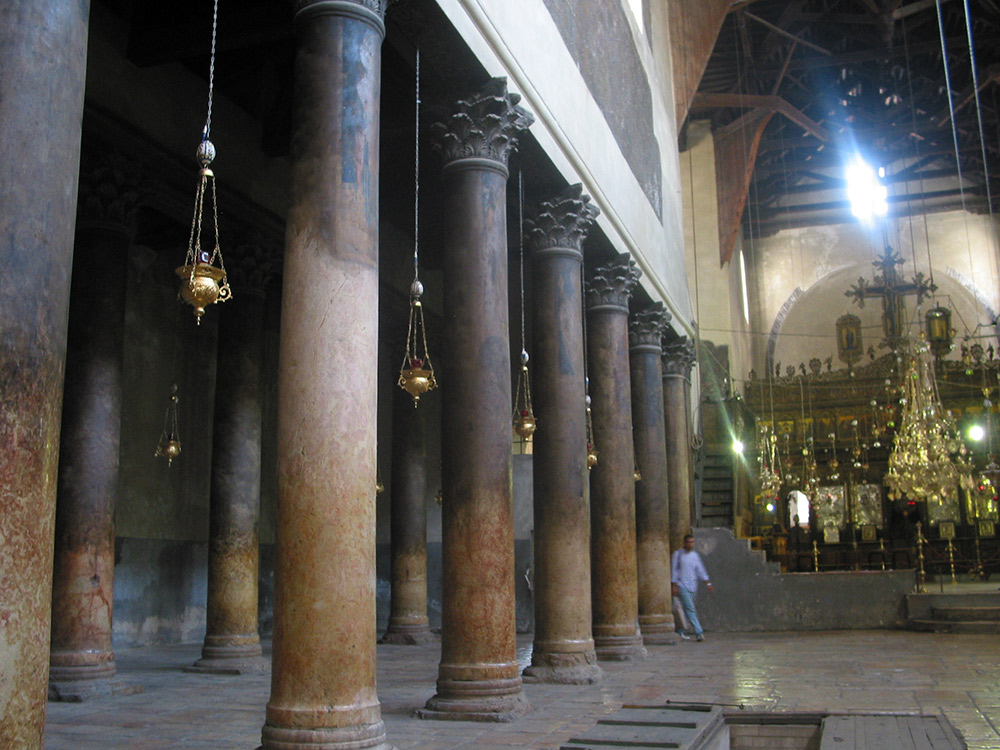
The Church of the Nativity in Bethlehem. According to Jerome, the site had temporarily been "overshadowed by a grove of Tammuz".

The Church Father Jerome records in a letter dated to the year 395 AD that "Bethlehem... belonging now to us... was overshadowed by a grove of Tammuz, that is to say, Adonis, and in the cave where once the infant Christ cried, the lover of Venus was lamented." This same cave later became the site of the Church of the Nativity. The church historian Eusebius, however, does not mention pagans having ever worshipped in the cave, nor do any other early Christian writers. Peter Welten has argued that the cave was never dedicated to Tammuz and that Jerome misinterpreted Christian mourning over the Massacre of the Innocents as a pagan ritual over Tammuz's death. Joan E. Taylor has countered this contention by arguing that Jerome, as an educated man, could not have been so naïve as to mistake Christian mourning over the Massacre of the Innocents as a pagan ritual for Tammuz.

During the sixth century AD, some early Christians in the Middle East borrowed elements from poems of Ishtar mourning over the death of Tammuz into their own retellings of the Virgin Mary mourning over the death of her son Jesus. The Syrian writers Jacob of Serugh and Romanos the Melodist both wrote laments in which the Virgin Mary describes her compassion for her son at the foot of the cross in deeply personal terms closely resembling Ishtar's laments over the death of Tammuz.

Tammuz is the month of July in Iraqi Arabic and Levantine Arabic (see Arabic names of calendar months), as well as in the Assyrian calendar and Jewish calendar, and references to Tammuz appear in Arabic literature from the 9th to 11th centuries AD. In what purports to be a translation of an ancient Nabataean text by Qūthāmā the Babylonian, Ibn Wahshiyya (c. 9th-10th century AD), adds information on his own efforts to ascertain the identity of Tammuz, and his discovery of the full details of the legend of Tammuz in another Nabataean book: "How he summoned the king to worship the seven (planets) and the twelve (signs) and how the king put him to death several times in a cruel manner Tammuz coming to life again after each time, until at last he died; and behold! it was identical to the legend of St. George." Ibn Wahshiyya also adds that Tammuz lived in Babylonia before the coming of the Chaldeans and belonged to an ancient Mesopotamian tribe called Ganbân. On rituals related to Tammuz in his time, he adds that the Sabaeans in Harran and Babylonia still lamented the loss of Tammuz every July, but that the origin of the worship had been lost. Ibn Wahshiyya's version of the Tammuz myth is also cited by Maimonides in his Guide for the Perplexed.

In the tenth century AD, the Arab traveler Al-Nadim wrote in his Kitab al-Fehrest that "All the Sabaeans of our time, those of Babylonia as well as those of Harran, lament and weep to this day over Tammuz at a festival which they, more particularly the women, hold in the month of the same name." Drawing from a work on Syriac calendar feast days, Al-Nadim describes a Tâ'ûz festival that took place in the middle of the month of Tammuz. Women bewailed the death of Tammuz at the hands of his master who was said to have "ground his bones in a mill and scattered them to the wind." Consequently, women would forgo the eating of ground foods during the festival time. The same festival is mentioned in the eleventh century by Ibn Athir, who recounts that it still took place every year at the appointed time along the banks of the Tigris river. Tammuz is still the name for the month of July in Iraqi Arabic.

== As a dying-and-rising god ==
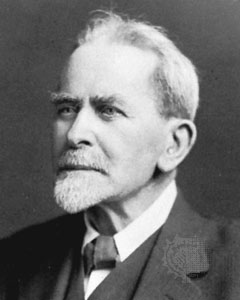
Photograph of Sir James George Frazer, the anthropologist who is most directly responsible for promoting the concept of a "dying and rising god" archetype

The late nineteenth-century Scottish anthropologist Sir James George Frazer wrote extensively about Tammuz in his monumental study of comparative religion The Golden Bough (the first edition of which was published in 1890) as well as in later works. Frazer claimed that Tammuz was just one example of the archetype of a "dying-and-rising god" found throughout all cultures. Frazer and others also saw Tammuz's Greek equivalent Adonis as a "dying-and-rising god". Origen discusses Adonis, whom he associates with Tammuz, in his Selecta in Ezechielem ( “Comments on Ezekiel”), noting that "they say that for a long time certain rites of initiation are conducted: first, that they weep for him, since he has died; second, that they rejoice for him because he has risen from the dead (apo nekrôn anastanti)." (Note: cf. J.-P. Migne, Patrologiae Cursus Completus: Series Graeca, 13:800)

Tammuz's categorization as a "dying-and-rising god" was based on the abbreviated Akkadian redaction of Inanna's Descent into the Underworld, which was missing the ending. Since numerous lamentations over the death of Dumuzid had already been translated, scholars filled in the missing ending by assuming that the reason for Ishtar's descent was because she was going to resurrect Dumuzid and that the text could therefore be assumed to end with Tammuz's resurrection. Then, in the middle of the twentieth century, the complete, unabridged, original Sumerian text of Inanna's Descent was finally translated, revealing that, instead of ending with Dumuzid's resurrection as had long been assumed, the text actually ended with Dumuzid's death.

The rescue of Dumuzid from the underworld was later found in the text Return of Dumuzid, translated in 1963. Biblical scholars Paul Eddy and Greg Boyd argued in 2007 that this text does not describe a triumph over death because Dumuzid must be replaced in the underworld by his sister, thus reinforcing the "inalterable power of the realm of the dead". However, other scholars have cited this as an example of a god who was previously dead and risen again.

== Literary references ==
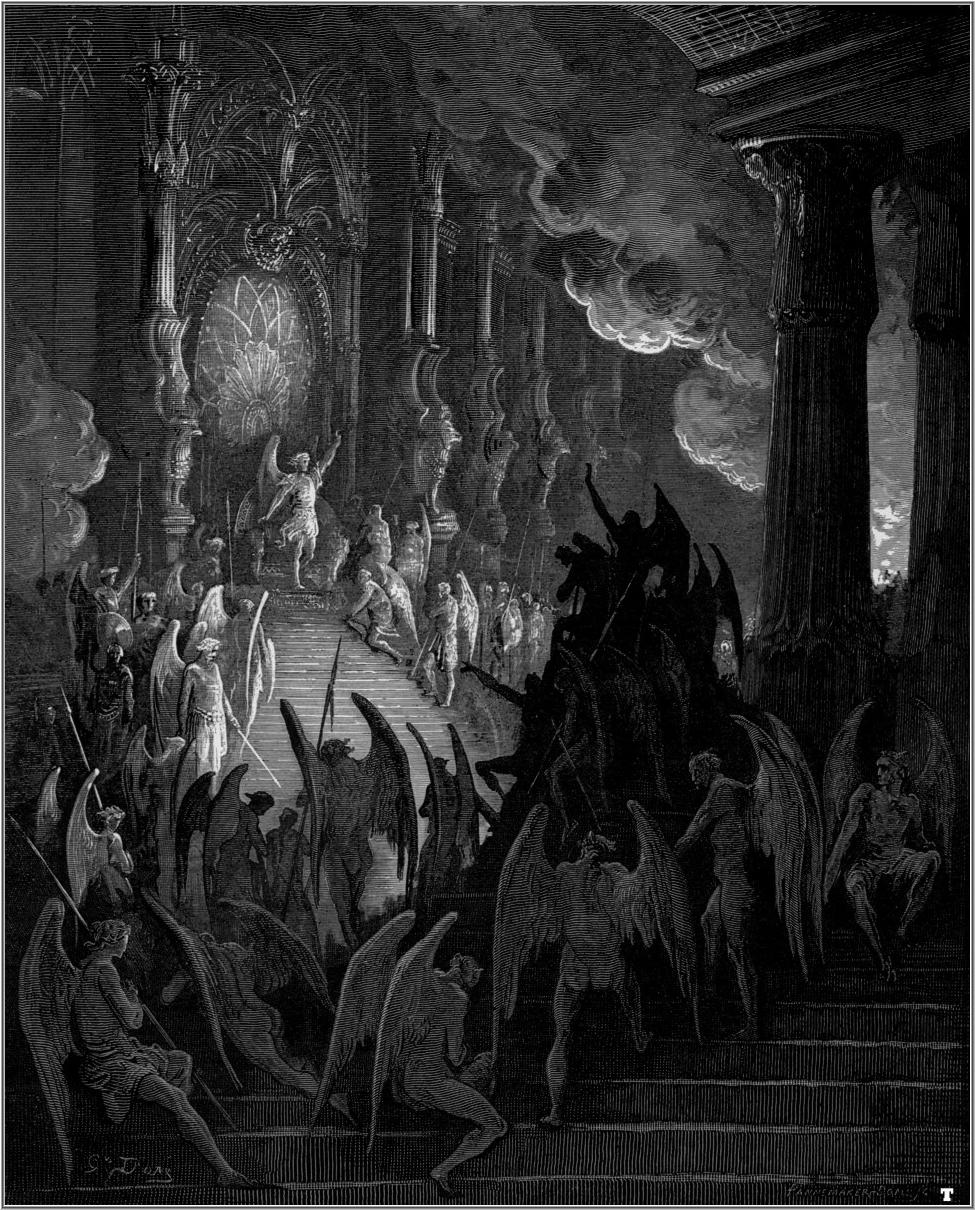
Tammuz appears as one of Satan's demons in Book I of John Milton's Paradise Lost, shown here in this engraving from 1866 by Gustave Doré

The references to the cult of Tammuz preserved in the Bible and in Greco-Roman literature brought the story to the attention of western European writers. The story was popular in Early Modern England and appeared in a variety of works, including Sir Walter Raleigh's History of the World (1614), George Sandys's Dictionarium Relation of a Journey (1615), and Charles Stephanus's Dictionarium Historicam (1553). These have all been suggested as sources for Tammuz's most famous appearance in English literature as a demon in Book I of John Milton's Paradise Lost, lines 446–457:

THAMMUZ came next behind,
Whose annual wound in LEBANON allur'd
The SYRIAN Damsels to lament his fate
In amorous dittyes all a Summers day,
While smooth ADONIS from his native Rock
Ran purple to the Sea, suppos'd with blood
Of THAMMUZ yearly wounded: the Love-tale
Infected SION'S daughters with like heat,
Whose wanton passions in the sacred Porch
EZEKIEL saw, when by the Vision led
His eye survey'd the dark Idolatries
Of alienated JUDAH.

- Oscar Wilde, "Charmides"

And then each pigeon spread its milky van,
The bright car soared into the dawning sky
And like a cloud the aerial caravan
Passed over the Ægean silently,
Till the faint air was troubled with the song
From the wan mouths that call on bleeding Thammuz all night long

== Family tree ==
An
Ninḫursaĝ	Enki born to Namma	Ninkikurga born to Namma	Nisaba born to Uraš	Ḫaya
Ninsar	Ninlil	Enlil
Ninkurra	Ningal maybe daughter of Enlil	Nanna	Nergal maybe son of Enki	Ninurta maybe born to Ninḫursaĝ	Baba born to Uraš
Uttu	Inanna possibly also the daughter of Enki, of Enlil, or of An	Dumuzid maybe son of Enki	Utu	Ninkigal married Nergal
Meškiaĝĝašer	Lugalbanda	Ninsumun
Enmerkar	Gilgāmeš
Urnungal

== See also ==
- History of Sumer
- Mesopotamian mythology
- Descent of Inanna into the Underworld

== Notes ==
Preceded by En-men-gal-ana	5th King of Sumer legendary	Succeeded by En-sipad-zid-ana of Larak
