= Uraš =

Mesopotamian earth goddess

Urash
- Goddess of earth

Genealogy
- Spouse: Anu
- Children: Amurru, Bau, Enki (sometimes), Geshtinanna (sometimes), Ishkur, Ishtaran, Lugalbanda (possibly), Ninisina, Ninkarrak, Ninsun (possibly)

Uraš (Sumerian: 𒀭𒅁, romanized: ^{d}Uraš), or Urash, was a Mesopotamian goddess regarded as the personification of the earth. She should not be confused with a male deity sharing the same name, who had agricultural character and was worshiped in Dilbat. She is well attested in association with Anu, most commonly as his spouse, though traditions according to which she was one of his ancestors or even his alternate name are also known. She could be equated with other goddesses who could be considered his wives, namely Ki and Antu, though they were not always regarded as identical. Numerous deities were regarded as children of Urash and Anu, for example Ninisina and Ishkur. However, in some cases multiple genealogies existed, for example Enki was usually regarded as the son of Nammu and Geshtinanna of Duttur, even though texts describing them as children of Urash exist. Not much evidence for the worship of Urash is available, though offerings to her are mentioned in documents from the Ur III period and it is possible she had a temple in Nippur.

== Name and character ==
Urash's name was usually represented by the cuneiform sign IB, typically prefaced by the so-called "divine determinative", DINGIR, though phonetic syllabic spellings such as ur_{5}-ra-aš or u_{4}-ra-aš are also attested, in some cases, for example in the god list An = Anum, as glosses. The precise origin of the name is a matter of dispute, though it is agreed that regardless of whether it originated in Sumerian or Akkadian, it was understood as "earth" or "tilth". Urash was accordingly considered the deification of the earth. She has been characterized as a primeval deity, comparable in that regard to Anu or Nammu. In some cases, Urash could be inserted into texts dealing with the Enki-Ninki deities, the ancestors of Enlil, due to shared association with the earth.

Urash was also the name of a male agricultural deity worshiped in Dilbat, and in some cases it is not certain whether he or the earth goddess is meant. In An = Anum both deities appear in separate sections. Wilfred G. Lambert has additionally suggested that a possible phonetic variant of the term uraš, supplied with the prefix nin, is the second element of the theonym Ninurta.

== Associations with other deities ==
=== Anu ===
Urash is well attested as a spouse of Anu. Frans Wiggermann outright refers to her as his most commonly recognized wife. She appears particularly commonly in association with him in texts from between the Akkadian and Old Babylonian periods. In some cases, it is impossible to tell if the writing AN IB refers to Urash alone (^{d}uraš) or Anu and her as a pair. As Anu's spouse, Urash could be addressed as bēlet-ilī, "queen of the gods", though in this context this name was only used as a descriptive epithet reflecting her position in the Mesopotamian pantheon and it did not imply an equation with the goddess usually designated by it, Ninhursag.

A tradition in which Urash was an ancestor of Anu is also known, for example from the god list An = Anum. A genealogy of Anu which Wilfred G. Lambert refers to as the "Theogony of Anu" mentions the pair Urash, here a male cosmogonic earth deity, and Ninurash, his female counterpart. Lambert speculated that in this context Urash might have been viewed as a descendant of either Nammu or "eternal time". He suggests the primordial deities Dūri and Dāri, whose names, while attested in Sumerian texts, were loanwords derived from the Akkadian phrase "ever and ever", might have represented the latter concept.

A number of texts treat Urash as a name of Anu himself, which is presumed to be related to the infrequent use of the word uraš to refer to heaven rather than earth, attested for example in Nabnitu, but the details of these developments are unknown.

=== Other spouses of Anu ===
It has been noted that the fact that in addition to Urash Anu could be paired with another earth deity, Ki, could sometimes lead to confusion, though ultimately the two were separate figures. It has been proposed that Anu paired with Ki represented heaven and earth as a unity prior to their cosmological separation, with Anu and Urash reflecting their later separated state instead. Another proposal is that Urash only represented the arable surface of earth, rather than its totality.

In a god list known from late Assyrian copies and a number of other sources the double name Ki-Urash (^{d}ki-uraš, 𒀭𒆠𒅁) appears, which indicates the two could be combined into a single designation for earth as a primordial being. The double name was initially misread as ^{d}ki-ib and thus misinterpreted as a reference to the Egyptian god Geb by Daniel David Luckenbill, but this proposal has been disproved and abandoned. In a fragmentary god list (KAV 52 // 54 // 71), Ku-Urash is paired with Alala, a figure attested among Anu's ancestors in An = Anum.

A lexical list from the Old Babylonian period equates Urash with Antu, yet another goddess who could be paired with Anu. The formula AN URAŠ present on a number of seals from the Kassite period might also refer to Anu and Antu. However, the latter was not commonly understood as a divine representation of earth.

=== Children ===
As already attested in hymns traditionally attributed to Enheduanna, numerous deities could be regarded as the children or grandchildren of Urash and Anu. Examples include the medicine goddesses Ninisina and Ninkarrak, as well as Amurru, Bau and Ishtaran. The only source directly referring to a deity as the mother of Ishkur also places Urash in this role, which can be considered an extension of his well attested position as a son of Anu. Enki is addressed as a son of Urash and Anu in the hymn Ishme-Dagan E (all names of hymns given follow the ETCSL naming system), but while Anu is attested as his father elsewhere, with this one exception his mother was believed to be Nammu. Geshtinanna is described as a daughter of Urash and Anu in the hymn Shulgi P, and by extension the king, addressed as her brother, also implicitly shares this ancestry. However, elsewhere the mother of this goddess is identified as Duttur. The hymn designated as Nisaba A refers to the eponymous goddess as her daughter, but she had no fixed parentage. Urash might also have been regarded as the mother of the hero Lugalbanda, though the evidence is indirect and limited to a single passage in the Old Babylonian poem Lugalbanda in the Mountain Cave, and in other compositions an emphasis is instead put on the absence of his parents. Additionally, evidence exists for Ninsun being regarded as Urash's daughter, though Jan Lisman argues that based on an Early Dynastic myth her parents should be considered unknown, as during her marriage a group of multiple gods fulfills the role which would normally belong to the parents.

It is also possible that the fact that the male Urash worshiped in Dilbat was regarded as Anu's son was influenced by the relation between the latter with the former's female namesake.

While Nanaya was referred to both as a daughter of Anu and as the "firstborn daughter of Urash", the male deity was meant in this case, and this epithet reflected the existence of two separate traditions about her parentage, rather than descent from the couple Urash and Anu.

== Worship ==
While uncommon, offerings to Urash and Anu as a pair are attested in documents from the Ur III period. Urash is also attested in a number of Old Babylonian letters, though she does not appear commonly in this context. According to Joan Goodnick Westenholz, the deity Urash-Nibru, "Urash of the city of Nippur", who had a temple in this location, should be considered a form of the female Urash.
