= Kuara =

Turkic god of thunder

Kuara is the god of thunder in Turkic mythology, and the son of Tengri. Kuara (also known as Kvara) was held in particular reverence by the early Danube people. This Oghur Turkic deity corresponds to Common Turkic Kayra who was believed to be the son of Tengri/Taňry in Turkic shamanism and Tengrism.
