= Duttur =

Mesopotamian pastoral goddess

Duttur (Sumerian language:𒀭𒁍𒁺, ^{d}BU-du) was a Mesopotamian goddess best known as the mother of Dumuzid. She frequently appears in texts mourning his death, either on her own or alongside Geshtinanna and Inanna. It is often assumed that she was associated with sheep.

== Name ==
The name of Dumuzid's mother was usually written as ^{d}BU-du. The possible readings of the cuneiform sign BU include sír and dur_{7}. Duttur is the commonly accepted reading of the name in modern scholarship, though the variant Durtur is also in use. Other attested writings include the Emesal forms Zertu and Zertur and Akkadian Dutturru. A rare spelling only known from the Old Babylonian period is Turtur. However, ^{d}TUR.TUR is also attested as a name of an unrelated deity worshiped in the Ur III period, sometimes written with the plural morpheme -ne and as a result interpreted as either "the small gods" (Dingir-TUR.TUR-ne) or "the divine children" (^{d}dumu-dumu-ne).

Duttur's name could also be represented logographically by the cuneiform sign U_{8}, "ewe." The same logogram could also be used to represent the name of the unrelated deity Ga'um, the shepherd of Sin, whose gender varies between sources. In at least one case, in an Assyrian god list fragment, U_{8} is used to write the names of them both without equating them.

The etymology of Duttur's name is not known, but it has been pointed out that it might have originally been a name with a reduplicated syllable, similar to various well attested Mesopotamian hypocorisms as well as to the name of another member of Dumuzid's family, his sister Belili.

== Character ==
Thorkild Jacobsen proposed that Duttur should be understood as a deification of the ewe (adult female sheep). This proposal has been subsequently accepted by other researchers, such as Bendt Alster, but according to Manfred Krebernik the evidence is not clear, as Duttur's name shows no etymological affinity with any attested terms related to sheep. He also notes that Duttur could be associated with Ninsun, who was connected with wild cows instead. On this basis he proposes that while she was definitely a goddess associated with livestock and pastoralism, she was not necessarily exclusively connected with sheep.

In Mesopotamian literature, Duttur was usually characterised as a mourning mother. She commonly appears in laments detailing her son Dumuzid's capture by the galla, in which she is one of the three goddesses who can be described as mourning him, the other two being his wife Inanna and his sister Geshtinanna.

A commentary on one of the Dumuzid laments states that Duttur was born in Ku'ara.

== Associations with other deities ==
Duttur was the mother of the dying god Dumuzid, as well as his well attested sister Geshtinanna. According to Old Babylonian incantations, Ea was the father of Dumuzid, but he plays no role in narrative texts about him, unlike his female relatives like Duttur. A further member of the family attested in known sources is the goddess Belili, who also appears to be Dumuzid's sister. The relation between her and the primordial deity Belili associated with Alala is presently uncertain.

Frans Wiggermann argues that Dumuzid's relationship with Duttur was ultimately less significant than his marriage to Inanna, even though his name's conventional translation, "good son," would point at a close connection with the former.

Ninsun, the goddess of wild cows, could be identified with Duttur. It is possible that this equation was the result of the network of associations between Dumuzid, Damu, and kings of the Third Dynasty of Ur, who referred to Ninsun as their divine mother. Dina Katz proposes that the tradition in which Ninsun, rather than Duttur, was the mother of Dumuzid was inspired by king lists, in which Dumuzid the Fisherman (a figure distinct from the god Dumuzid) is listed between Lugalbanda, the husband of Ninsun, and Gilgamesh, her son, though without being labeled as a son of the former. In at least one case, Dumuzid is called the son of both Ninsun and Lugalbanda.

In the Weidner god list, Duttur is placed near Ereshkigal, rather than with Dumuzi in the circle of Inanna. Dina Katz proposes that this placement was a nod to a tradition in which Ereshkigal was herself depicted as a mourning mother of Ninazu, and as such had traits similar to Duttur. One eršemma composition dedicated to Duttur and Dumuzid, most likely dating to the Old Babylonian period, indicates that the traditions about various dying gods (Damu, Dumuzid, Ningishzida) and their mourning relatives could intersect or merge.
