= Music of Mesopotamia =

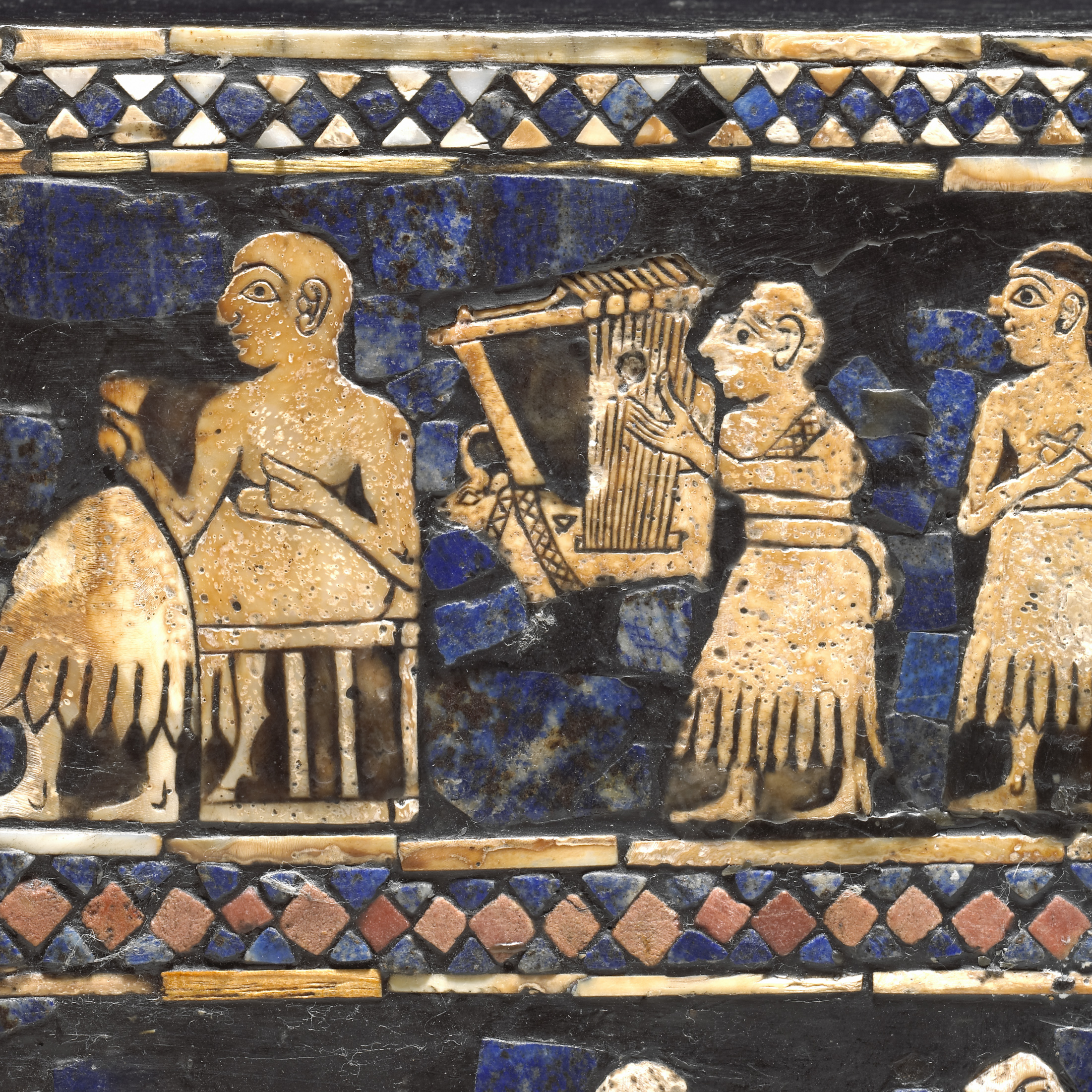
A depiction of a singer and a lyre player entertaining guests at a banquet c. 2500 BCE. Music was a normal part of social life in Mesopotamia. Detail from the Standard of Ur. British Museum, London.

Music was ubiquitous throughout Mesopotamian history, playing important roles in both religious and secular contexts. Mesopotamia is of particular interest to scholars because evidence from the region—which includes artifacts, artistic depictions, and written records—places it among the earliest well-documented cultures in the history of music. The discovery of a bone wind instrument dating to the 5th millennium BCE provides the earliest evidence of music culture in Mesopotamia; depictions of music and musicians appear in the 4th millennium BCE; and later, in the city of Uruk, the pictograms for 'harp' and 'musician' are present among the earliest known examples of writing.

Music played a central role in Mesopotamian religion and some instruments themselves were regarded as minor deities and given proper names, such as Ninigizibara. Its use in secular occasions included festivals, warfare, and funerals—among all classes of society. Mesopotamians sang and played percussion, wind, and string instruments; instructions for playing them were discovered on clay tablets. Surviving artifacts include the oldest known string instruments, the Lyres of Ur, which includes the Bull Headed Lyre of Ur.

There are several surviving works of written music; the Hurrian songs, particularly the "Hymn to Nikkal", represent the oldest known substantially complete notated music. Modern scholars have attempted to recreate the melodies from these works, although there is no consensus on exactly how the music would have sounded. The Mesopotamians had an elaborate system of music theory and some level of music education. Music in Mesopotamia influenced, and was influenced by, music in neighboring cultures of antiquity based in Egypt, East and West Africa, and the Mediterranean coast.

Much of what researchers know about Mesopotamian music comes from clay tablets. Scribes would use a reed stylus to make wedge-shaped impressions in wet clay, and the tablets would be baked. Using this cuneiform script, they recorded texts that listed genres and song titles, included instructions on how to play instruments, and articulated their music theory. By piecing together thousands of surviving tablets, as well as examining surviving artworks and instruments, researchers have been able to offer a detailed picture of Mesopotamian music culture.

== Uses of music ==
=== Religious ===
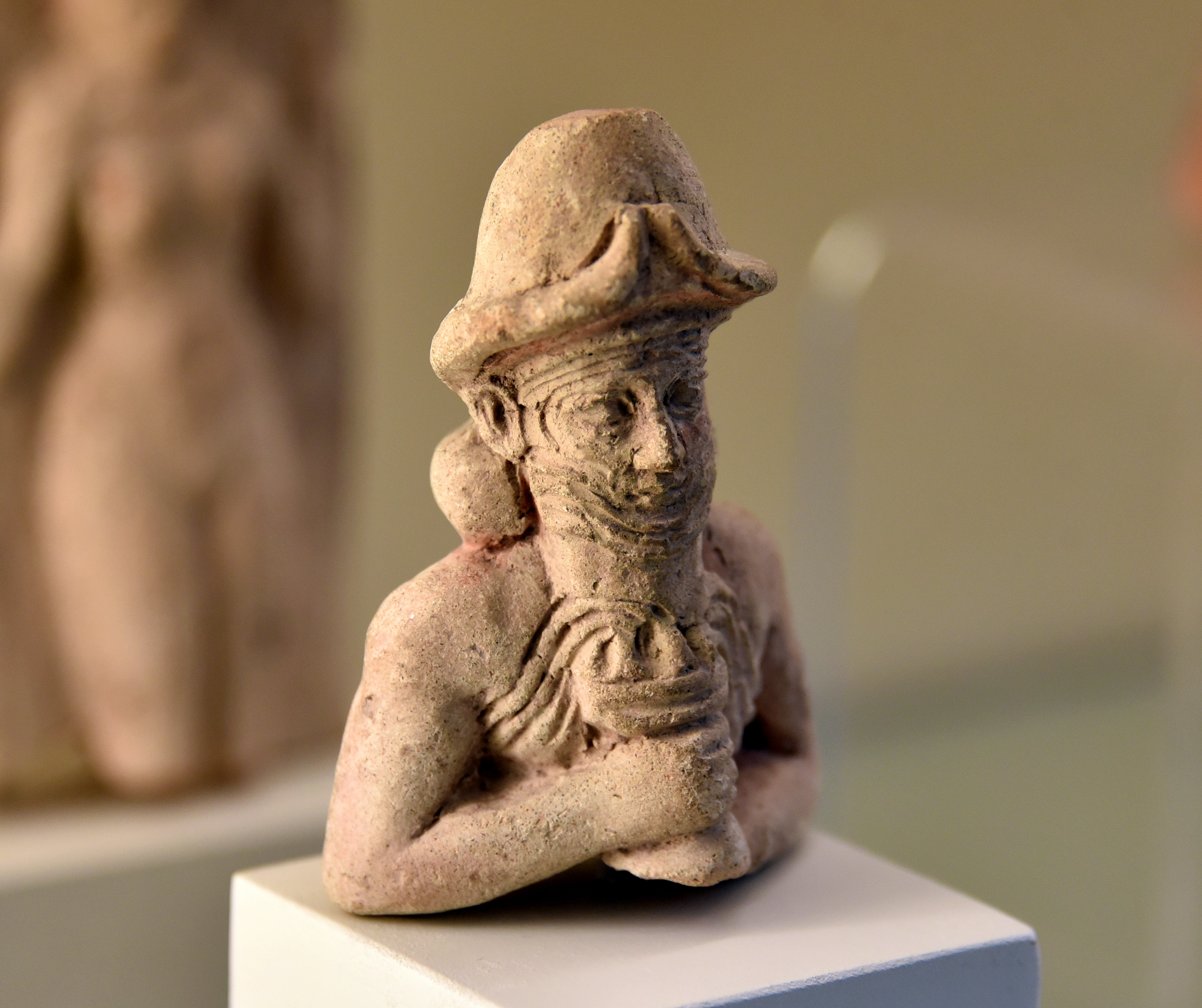
Ea (also Enki), deity of music, wears a horned helmet and holds a cup from which water overflows. Old Babylonian period, 19th–17th century BCE. Pergamon Museum, Berlin.

Music played a central role in ancient Mesopotamian religion. In the Old Babylonian period (c. 1894 BCE – c. 1595 BCE), when music was performed as part of a religious ceremony, the practitioners, known in Sumerian as gala priests, sang in a dialect of Sumerian called Emesal. There were two types of Emesal prayers, the Balag and the Ershemma, named after the instruments used in their performance (the balag and shem, respectively). In some depictions of religious festivals, musicians were accompanied by dancers, jugglers, and acrobats.

Evidence from the city of Mari offers a picture of how the musicians were situated within the temple. An instrument called Ninigizibara was placed opposite a statue of that city's deity, Eštar. Singers sat to the right of the instrument, an orchestra sat to its left, and female musicians stood behind the instrument. Ritual acts were performed during these sung lamentation prayers, whose purpose was to persuade the local deity not to abandon the city. Moreover, some laments included grief over the loss of music itself during the destruction of a city and its temple. In one such work, the "weeping goddess" Ninisinna laments the destruction of her city, Isin, not only bemoaning the loss of food, drink, and luxury, but also because there were "no sweet-sounding musical instruments such as the lyre, drum, tambourine, and reed pipe; no comforting songs and soothing words from the temple singers and priests".

Some rituals involved the instruments themselves, deified, and capable of receiving animal sacrifices as gods. In a ritual closely associated with a drum described in an Akkadian text, a bull was brought to the temple and offerings were made to Ea, god of music and wisdom. Various parts of the bull were burned with a torch during the ritual. Twelve linens were placed on the ground, and a bronze image of a god was placed on top of each linen. Sacrifices were made and a drum was put into place. The bronze images were then put inside the drum, incantations were whispered into the bull's ears, a hymn was sung accompanied by an oboe, and the bull was sacrificed.

=== Secular ===
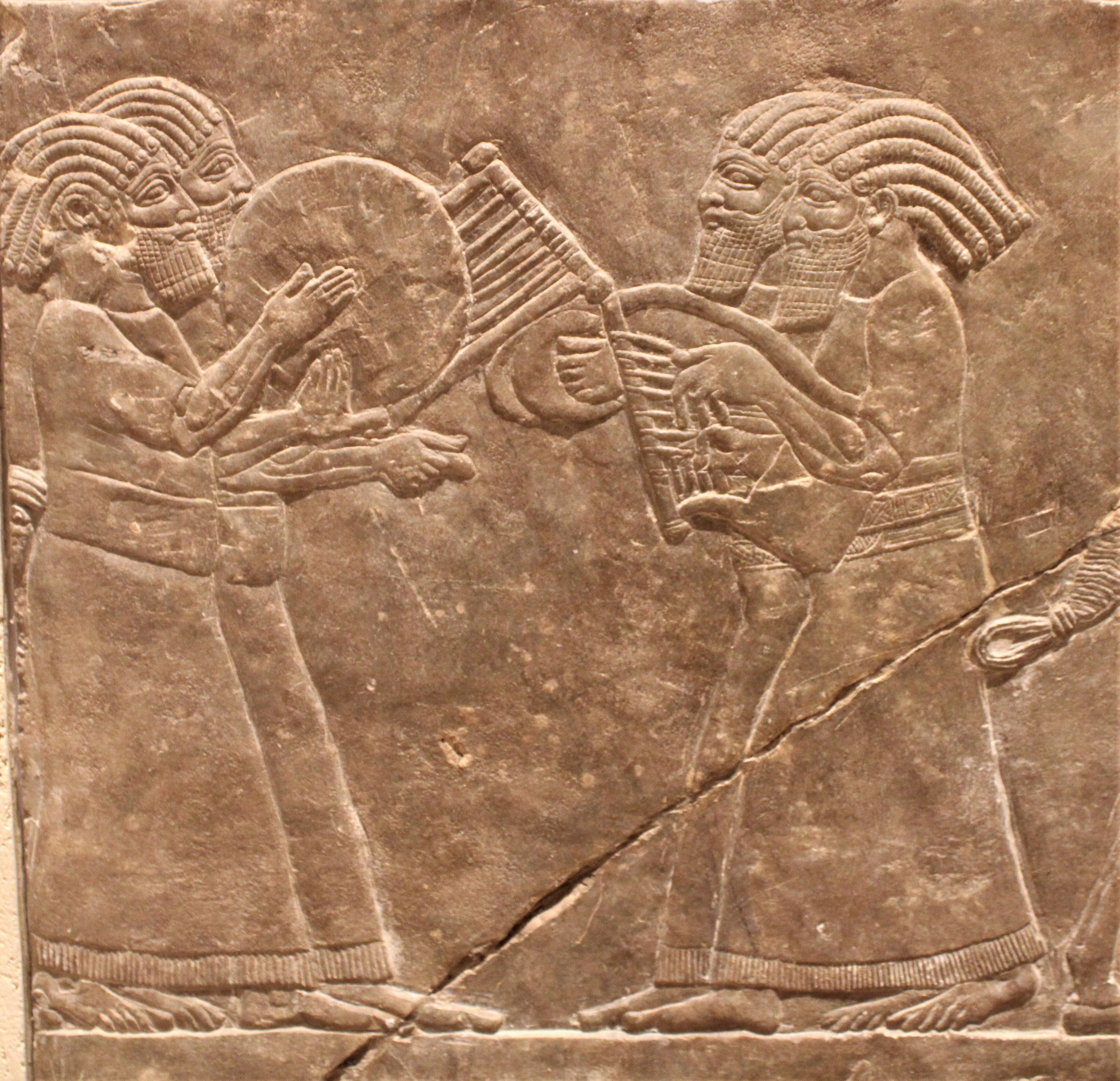
Musicians of the Assyrian army c. 645 BCE. Nineveh, bas relief in Gypsum alabaster. Palace of Ashurbanipal, Nineveh.

The Akkadian word for music, nigūtu, also meant 'joy' and 'merriment', well illustrated by a seal in the Louvre showing a peaceful scene of a shepherd playing a flute to his flock. Music was a normal part of social life in Mesopotamia and was used in many secular contexts. Music played important roles at funerals, among royalty, and was also depicted in relation to sports and sex. Mesopotamian love songs, which represented a distinct genre of music, nevertheless shared features in common with religious music. Inana and Dumuzi, often featured in laments, are also prominent as the divine lovers in romantic songs, and both genres used Emesal, a dialect associated with women. The use of Emesal by women singers extended into wedding songs as well, but over time these singing roles were taken over by male performers, at least among the elite. In the Early Dynastic III period, music was depicted at banquets, but the purpose is unclear. The celebration may have been "a regular calendrical event, such as the New Year's festival" or the occasions may have been "extensions of temple practices or celebrations of successful military campaigns".

As in neighboring cultures, Mesopotamian music played an important role in the military. While the musical instruments of war varied from culture to culture, the intention of the music was the same — to "carry terror to the hearts of the foe". Martens writes:

The Assyrians made battle music a real influence in the determination of conquest. Their footmen struck to the sound of drum, cymbal and shrill double-flutes, and when the fierce Assyrian horsemen charged they did so to the clashing of iron bells (like modern sleigh-bells), with which their harness was hung. From 1100 B.C. until its conquest by the Persians, Asia danced to the tune of the Assyrian war-pipes, and blood flowed where they sounded. The Babylonians, Hittites, Canaanites, Syrian Phoenicians, Jews, Egyptians and Lydian Greeks yielded up their goods and treasure to these martial pipings, and gold, silver, lapis lazuli, gums, spices, war-chariots, horses, cattle and slaves pour into the Assyrian capital to the tempo of their military.

Musicologist J. Peter Burkholder lists genres of secular music including "work songs, nursery songs, dance music, tavern music, music for entertaining at feasts, and epics sung with instrumental accompaniment". Vibrant wall paintings illustrate dancing, and several genres of dance can be distinguished on wall reliefs, cylinder seals, and painted pottery; depictions of musical instruments accompany them. Secular music was comforting to the Mesopotamian people: one incantation tells of a homesick scribe who was stuck and ill in Elam-Anšan; he longed "to be healed by the music of the horizontal harp with seven strings".

== Musicians ==
=== Education ===
As in ancient Egypt, Mesopotamian schools taught music. Active by the 3rd millennium BCE, these schools—known in Sumerian as edubbas—were chiefly for educating scribes and priests. Extant clay tablets often record information on student activities in edubbas, and indicate that their examinations included questions on differentiating and identifying instruments, singing technique, and analyzing compositions. Other tablets include information on how to play musical instruments. Sumerian texts indicate that choral training occurred by 3000 BCE in the temple of Ningarsu in Lagash; choral performances developed into highly complex responsorial chanting with instrumental parts, which the musicologist Charles Plummeridge notes "must have required expert tuition and direction".

In the 18th century BCE, a nascent music school existed in Mari, where young musicians may have been purposefully blinded. The fact that Mesopotamians connected blindness (Note: The oldest known Sumerian term for "blind" is igi-nu-du_{8}.) with musicianship is expressed in literature. Gabbay writes: "In the Sumerian myth Enki and Ninmah, the goddess Ninmah creates various human creatures, and their destiny is then fixed by the god Enki. When Ninmah creates a blind person, Enki allots him the "art of the musician"." Texts reveal that a disproportionate number of Mesopotamian musicians were blind.

Outside of the classroom, music was taught through one-on-one apprenticeship. Both male and female musicians were trained, some of whom lived with their teachers. Contracts for training were either official, as among royalty, or in a private agreement between two families; music was also passed down within a family. Among the elite class, children received a comprehensive education in reading, writing, religion, the sciences, law, and medicine, among other topics; whether music was included is largely uncertain. Some evidence suggests that Mesopotamians had toy instruments.

=== Societal role ===
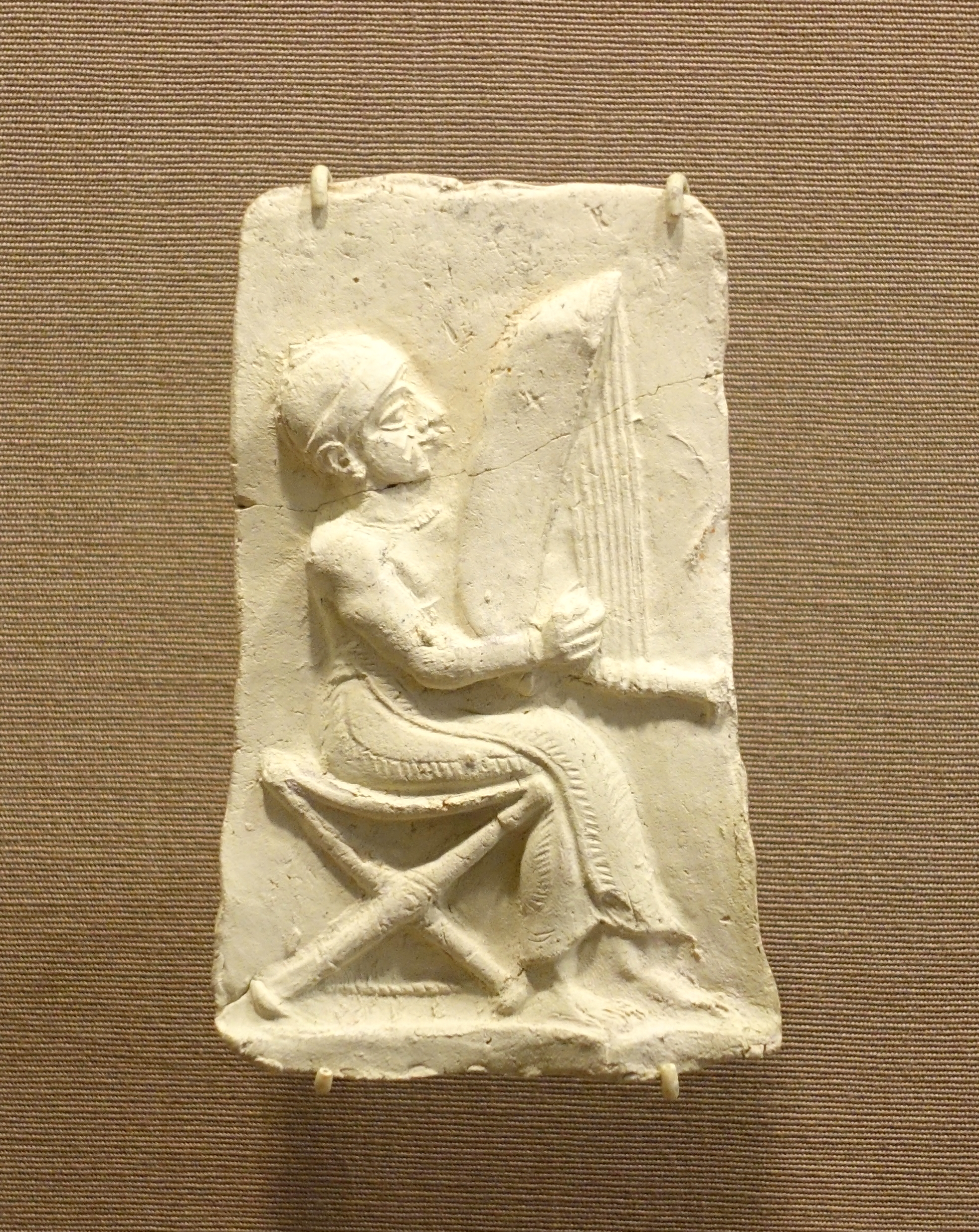
Plaque with male musician playing a harp. Ischali, baked clay. Oriental Institute Museum, University of Chicago, Chicago.

Sumerian and Akkadian language texts provide insight into the role of musicians in society. Two distinct types of musicians are known, the gala and the nar. Both classes of musicians were highly regarded, and associated with religion and royalty, but their roles differed. The gala (Akkadian: kalû) musician was closely associated with temple rituals; it has been suggested by the musicologist Piotr Michalowski that their job was "normally less glamorous and perhaps temporary". Musical instruments associated with the gala priests include a small drum (Sumerian: ub, Akkadian: appu), a timpani (Sumerian: lilis), and a sistrum or cymbals (Sumerian: meze), although not much is known about these instruments. There are hundreds of individual named musicians, such as the gala musician Ur-Utu, who are known from administrative documents. In some cases, archaeological findings have identified the homes and family histories of these musicians, revealing their high status in society. Gala musicians were associated with the god Enki.

The nar (Akkadian: nāru) musician, who had a close association with royalty, was known to play and transport musical instruments and to have a close correspondence with the king. The chief musician of the palace directed musical performances and also taught apprentice musicians. In the royal harem, which included the king's wives, concubines, children, and servants, the king also kept young apprentice musicians. The possession of musicians was a sign of status, and musicians were traded over long distances, including as diplomatic gifts and in war. When the Assyrian military conquered a city, they would spare the musicians and send them to Nineveh with the spoils. An epic tale called "The Death of Gilgamesh" details how Gilgamesh offered gifts to the gods on behalf of his wives and children, but also on behalf of his musicians. Musicians sometimes accompanied royalty to their graves. In the Royal Cemetery at Ur, archaeologist Leonard Woolley found a girl musician lying down, harp in hand, inside the tomb of Queen Puabi.

The gender of ancient Mesopotamian musicians is debated. Some sources indicate that gala priests, for example, were either genderfluid or regarded as a third gender. Gabbay writes, "The term Gala/kalû should be understood as a general concept, relating to a third gender which shares features of both female and male, but which is an independent gender category." Other sources suggest they may have been homosexual or intersex. Still, other texts, including music instruction texts, differentiate between male and female apprentice musicians. Some of the ambiguity surrounding the gala's gender could be explained by the history of lamentation prayers, which may have originated with the funerary laments of women. The earliest documented gala performance was in the context of a funeral, with women lamenters accompanying the gala in the mourning. These origins may explain why female characteristics, and the dialect associated with women, Emesal, have long been associated with the gala and temple prayers.

=== Specific personalities ===
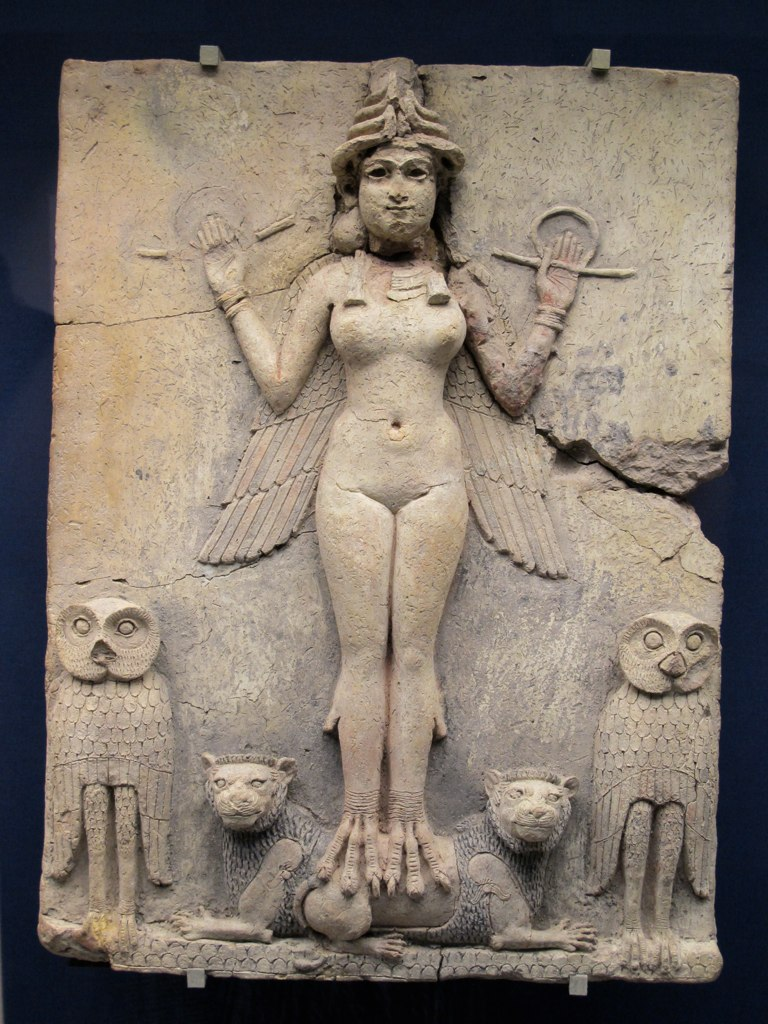
The goddess Ishtar, to whom Enheduanna composed numerous hymns. Old Babylonian, 1800-1750 BCE. British Museum, London.

Shulgi of Ur, who ruled c. 2094 – c. 2046 BCE during the Third Dynasty of Ur, was a generous patron of the arts, especially music. In self-laudatory texts, he professed to be an expert musician, claiming that the zeal with which he studied it prevented it from being too difficult. He listed numerous instruments he claimed to have mastered: (Note: [The italicized terms are Sumerian and are left untranslated due to uncertainty about their meanings.]) the algar, the sabîtum, the mirîtum, the urzababîtum, the harhar, the "Great Lion," the dìm, and the magur; he also claimed to have mastered the art of composition of genres such as the tigi and the adab. Shulgi seemed to enjoy playing all instruments except the reed pipe, which he believed brought sadness to the spirit, whereas music should bring joy and cheer. Shulgi generously funded Sumer's two major edubbas, those of Ur and Nippur; in return, Sumerian poets composed hymns of glorification in his honor.

The best-known musician of the Third Dynasty of Ur period, Dada, was a wealthy individual who held the title of gala. His career began during the reign of Shulgi, and it seems that he was a special kind of gala who acted as the gala of the royal court or even of the state, and was in charge of other galas. Dada organized musical events, looking after both the instruments and related entertainment, including handling a bear cub. He and his family owned residences in both Girsu and Ur, and two of Dada's children, Hedut-Amar-Sin and Šu-Sin-migir-Eštar, entertained the king with their own music. Dada's main assistant, or perhaps star performer, was a nar musician named Ur-Ningublaga. While Dada's story offers a glimpse into the life of a Mesopotamian musician, it is likely that he was an exceptional example, and that most gala musicians would have held more mundane roles.

Among the earliest known composers in the history of music was an Akkadian priestess, Enheduanna, active around 2300 BCE. The daughter of Sargon of Akkad, founder of the Akkadian Empire, Enheduanna was simultaneously a princess, priestess, and poetess who wrote a cycle of hymns to the temples of Sumer and Akkad, including devotional hymns for the gods Sin and Inanna, the texts for which survive. Her work was prolific and also well documented; as many as fifty copies of some of her hymnal works have survived, but none of her music. She authored nin-me-sar-ra, a short (153 line) poem in which she may allude to her own songwriting at a critical moment in the work. She is the likely author of a hymn entitled the 'Myth of Inanna and Ebih' (in-nin me-huš-a). Some of her works had themes related to her father's accomplishments, while others are autobiographical—she speaks in the first person at least once. Her poems were quite popular in Babylon and her hymnal organization likely influenced many generations of composers. She is referred to by name in a hymn to Dumuzi, attesting to her popularity in the region.

== Instruments ==
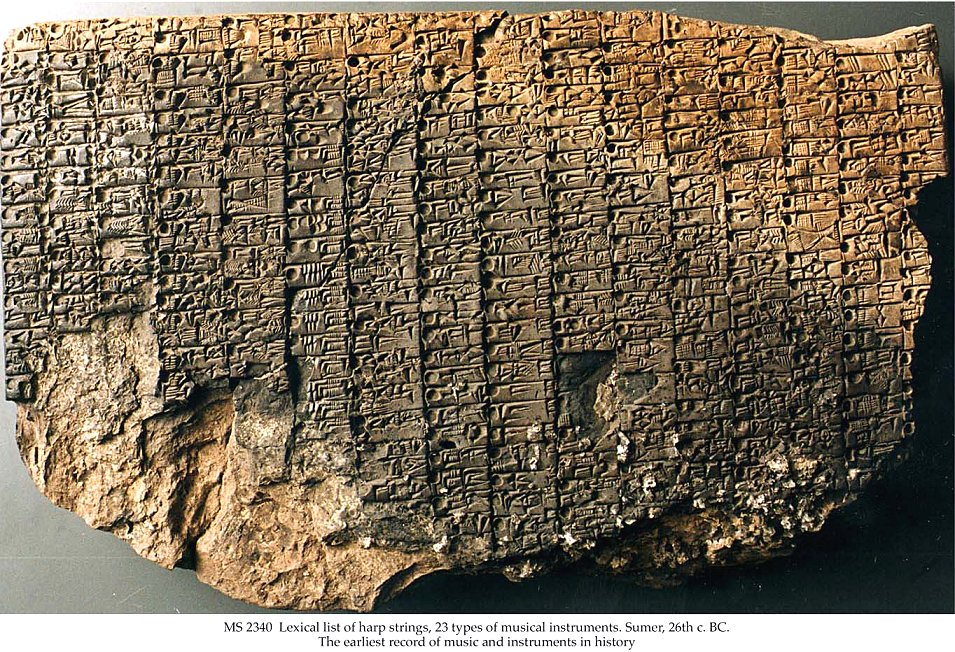
Clay tablet recording the names of 23 types of musical instruments. Sumer, 26th C. BCE. The Schøyen Collection, Oslo.

Instruments of ancient Mesopotamia include harps, lyres, lutes, reed pipes, and drums. While much is known about Mesopotamian instruments, musicologist Carl Engel points out that because the main depictions of musical instruments come from reliefs celebrating royal and religious events, it is likely that there are many instruments, perhaps popular ones, that scholars are unaware of.

=== Divinity of instruments ===
Musical instruments were intimately associated with Mesopotamian religion, and some were regarded as minor gods: intermediaries that could help the priest communicate with a major god. Clear evidence for the divinity of musical instruments comes from the Sumerian language. Determinatives, or unvocalized logograms that show the category of a noun, inform the reader whether the object in question is, for example, made of wood (𒄑, giš), is a person (𒇽, lú), or is a building (𒂍, é). The proper names of certain Mesopotamian musical instruments are always accompanied by the divine determinative (𒀭, dingir) used for gods. Furthermore, these instruments' names appear in written lists of gods. Franklin writes, "These were not symbols of the gods, but instantiations of some sort [...] divinized cult-objects were gods." The Mesopotamians made various offerings to these instruments, such as animal sacrifices, spices, and jewelry.

This was especially true of an instrument known as a balag, whose identity is disputed but which may have been a string instrument or a drum. During his reign in Lagash (c. 2100 BCE), Gudea commissioned balags such as 'Great Dragon of the Land' (Ušumgal-kalama) and 'Lady as Exalted as Heaven', and some calendar years were named for the balag that was deified and dedicated. Several balags are known to have been minor gods related to the sun-god Utu, associated with law and justice, including 'Let me live by His Word', 'Just Judge', and 'Decision of Sky and Earth'. Other named instrument-gods include Nin-an-da-gal-ki and the 'Red-Eyed Lord' (Lugal-igi-ḫuš). Furthermore, some kings inserted their names into the proper name of the instrument; Ishbi-Erra, during the Isin dynasty, dedicated a deified balag named 'Ishbi-Erra trusts in Enlil', suggesting that this instrument was "an intermediary between the earthly king and his divine counterpart". During the rituals associated with these balags, the lines between priest, musician, instrument, god, and king were blurred, and within this context, the Mesopotamians believed the balag played itself. Franklin writes:

Perhaps sympathetic vibration played a role here, since an unplayed Ninigizibara (Note: [i.e., a named balag instrument]) would still murmur in response to the music of others. Was this seen as evidence that the instrument was indeed alive, had its own voice, and was itself lamenting?

=== Voice ===
Contracts for the employment of musicians in temples survive and reveal that a large number of singers were used in the ritual performances. While the exact nature of these performances may never be known, musicologist Peter van der Merwe speculates that the vocal tone or timbre was probably similar to the "pungently nasal sound" of the narrow-bore reed pipes. He suggests that ancient Mesopotamian singing included trills, mordents, glides and microtonal inflections associated with a nasal timbre; Mesopotamian singers also made use of the drone. Reliefs carved in stone show that singers would sometimes squeeze their larynx with their fingers in order to achieve high notes. Researchers also know that choral singing was sometimes done in unison and at other times in parts; Geshtinanna was the goddess of singing in unison.

=== Percussion ===
Percussive instruments in ancient Mesopotamia included clappers, scrapers, rattles, sistra, cymbals, bells, and drums. A scraper consisted of a stick and an object with notches cut in it, while rattles were made of gourds or other materials and contained pebbles or clay objects that produced the rattling sound when shaken. A Mesopotamian sistrum consisted of a handle, a frame, and cross bars that jingled. Cymbals were small but heavy, with some shaped like plates and others like cups, and some were made of bronze.

Mesopotamian art depicts at least four types of drums: a shallow drum, which a Sumerian relief dating to 2100 BCE depicts as an estimated 1.7 metres (5 ft 7 in) across, and which required two men to play; a small cylindrical drum held horizontally; a large footed drum; and a small drum with one head, carried vertically. Sumerian drums were made of metal rather than wood and were played with the hands rather than with sticks. The skin of the Babylonian drum was made from bull hide, and the placement of the skin over the sacred instrument was itself the subject of a ritual at the Temple of Ea.

=== Wind ===
Almost no wind instruments survive, but there is ample evidence of their use in artistic depictions and literature. Wind instruments included flutes, oboes, horns, and pan-pipes, made of wood, animal horn, bone, metal, and reed. A short horn instrument used by the Hittites was a precursor to the Jewish shofar. The reed pipe was played on sad occasions, such as funerals.

Two silver pipes dating to 2800 BCE were discovered in Ur. Both pipes are 24 centimetres (9.4 in) in length. One has four finger holes and the other has three; when placed next to each other, three of the finger holes from each pipe are aligned. While scholars agree this was a reeded instrument, it's unclear whether it was a single or double reed, and some scholars claim that ancient Mesopotamians did not have a single-reeded instrument such as a clarinet. These silver pipes are the oldest known wind instrument, predating a set of Egyptian reed pipes by five hundred years. Similar pipes made of gold, silver, and bronze are described in texts from the same city.

The word "flute" (Akkadian: embūbu) appears in the Epic of Gilgamesh, the earliest surviving literary work from Mesopotamia. The text describes "A flute of carnelian". (Note: [Tablet VIII, line 148, translation by Andrew R. George]) There are numerous depictions of flutes in visual art throughout Mesopotamian history, including a woman playing a flute on a Sumerian shell ornament from Nippur dating to 2600–2500 BCE, a flautist on an Akkadian cylinder seal dating to 2400–2200 BCE, an ivory box from Nimrud dating to 900–700 BCE, and in a bas relief from Nineveh dating to 645 BCE.

=== String ===
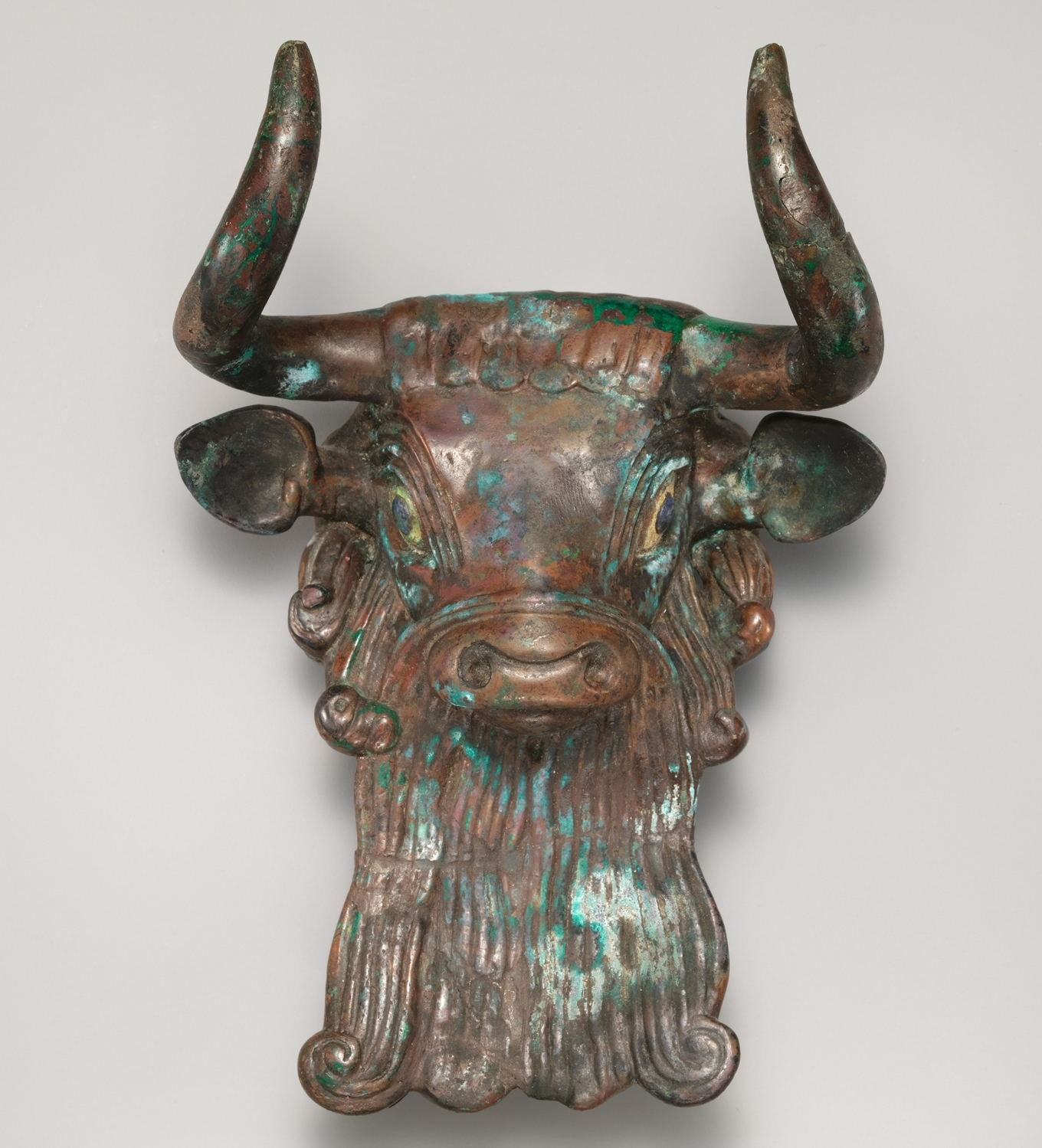
Bull's head ornament for a lyre, Sumerian, c. 2600 – c. 2350 BCE. Bronze, inlaid with shell and lapis lazuli. Metropolitan Museum of Art.

String instruments included harps, lyres, lutes, and psalteries. The Mesopotamian harp originated from the warrior's bow, perhaps by the addition of a gourd as a resonator, and became the ancestor to the lyre and other stringed instruments. Strings may have been made with catgut, as was done by the Egyptians, or with silk. Plucked instruments came in many varieties, differing in the manner in which they were intended to be held. The psaltery, whose strings are parallel to the soundbox and stretched across its full length, first appears in the 8th century BCE on a Phoenecian ivory piece (British Museum). This instrument is sometimes called the 'dulcimer' when struck or the 'psaltery' when plucked. When used by royalty or as part of a religious ceremony, string instruments were adorned with precious metals and stones, such as gold, silver, lapis lazuli, and mother of pearl.

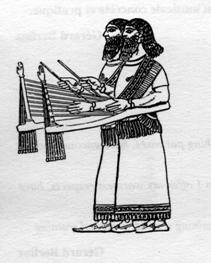
Musicians play the Mesopotamian dulcimer, a string instrument with many modern names and derivatives.

The body of the lyre (Sumerian: zami, Babylonian: sammu, Hittite: zinar) was a representation of an animal's body, such as a cow, bull, calf, donkey, or stag. Archaeologist Leonard Woolley suggested that the animal head depicted on the front of the lyre indicated the instrument's register. For example, a bull-headed lyre would be in the bass register, a cow-headed lyre would be a tenor, and a calf-headed lyre would be an alto. The legs of the instrument were meant to represent animal legs, with the rear post as the tail. The instrument was played either in place with its legs on the ground, or as part of a procession, carried over the shoulder with a strap.

The oldest pictorial record of lute playing is on an Uruk-period cylinder seal (British Museum) dating to 3100 BCE that depicts a female figure with a long-necked instrument sitting at the back of a boat in a musician's posture. Two seals in the British Museum from the Agade period (c. 2340 BCE – c. 2198 BCE) depict lutenists playing their instruments in the presence of Ea. Later representations appear after the Third Dynasty of Ur, including a relief from Larsa (Louvre) showing a sexual scene involving two participants, a lute, and a small drum; a relief from Mari (Iraq Museum) depicting bow-legged figures playing three-stringed lutes while apes watch; a relief from Nippur (Philadelphia Museum) showing a shepherd playing a lute; a relief from Nippur (Iraq Museum) showing a figure holding a lute in the right hand and a plectrum in the left; a relief from Uruk (Vorderasiatisches Museum) showing a lute being played alongside a lyre; and a Kassite seal (Louvre) showing the same. A comparison of these depictions reveals that lutes were held in different postures during different time periods, possibly affecting the range of the instrument.

=== Surviving instruments ===
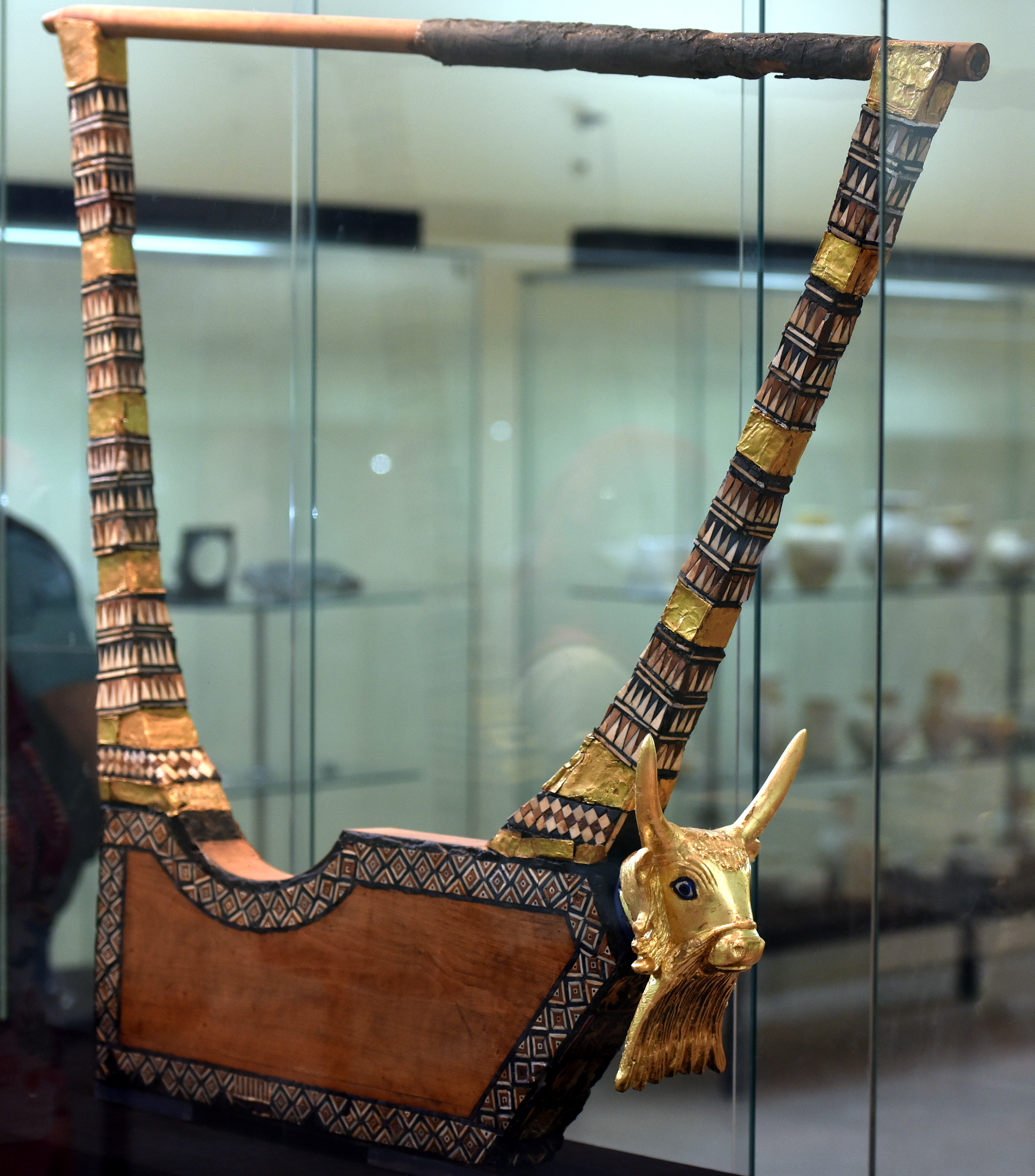
The Gold Lyre from the Royal Cemetery at Ur. C. 2500 BCE. Iraq Museum. Some elements are original, including the shell and lapis-lazuli mosaic, some of the sheet gold, and part of the silver cross-bar. The wood body and gold head are modern. The instrument also likely had legs, but these were not reconstructed. Iraq Museum, Baghdad.

Although musicians and musical instruments were depicted in Mesopotamian art in various forms over a 3,000 year period, very few of the instruments themselves have survived. Only eleven stringed instruments have been recovered, nine lyres and two harps, all from the Royal Cemetery of Ur. These Lyres of Ur include the "Gold Lyre" (Iraq Museum) and the "Bull Headed Lyre" (Penn Museum).

The Gold Lyre of Ur now held in the Iraq Museum is a partial reconstruction; the original was destroyed in the looting that followed the US invasion of Baghdad during the second Iraq War. Musicologist Samuel Dorf details the event:

In early April of 2003, the museum was looted. The lyre went missing, only to be found in pieces. The irreparably damaged gold and mother-of-pearl bull's head was subsequently discovered in the flooded basement vaults of Iraq's Central Bank. Looters stripped parts of the body of much of its gold and left the remains in a parking lot.

The destruction of these antiquities during the war sparked widespread international condemnation. In a 2016 event held in London's Trafalgar Square meant to condemn ISIS and the looting, singer/composer Stef Conner and harpist Mark Hamer performed with a replica of the lyre, recreated by harpist Andy Lowings. The lyre was built of authentic wood, and adorned with lapis lazuli, other precious stones, and $13,000 worth of 24k gold. They played a musical interpretation of The Epic of Gilgamesh from their 2014 album The Flood.

At Ur, an especially ornate harp was found in the grave of Queen Puabi. Whereas the largest of the lyres had a register similar to a modern bass viol, and the smaller silver lyre had a register like a cello, Puabi's harp fell in the register of a small guitar. UC Berkeley professor Robert R. Brown made three playable replicas of Puabi's harp, one of which is held in the British Museum. Musicologist Claire Polin describes the richly adorned instrument:

a graceful boat-shaped instrument with gold knobs upon the eleven-stringed posts. The body terminated in a golden calf's head with lapis lazuli hair and beard, shell and lapis eyes, a mosaic-studded collar, a spacious wooden soundbox with inlaid edges of mosaic, red limestone, shell, and lapis.

Other instruments discovered at the cemetery include a pair of silver pipes, as well as drums, sistra, and cymbals. In earlier findings dating to the 5th millennium BCE, two bone wind instruments have been recovered, one complete and the other in fragments. Also recovered is a fragment of a clay whistle from Uruk dating to c. 3200 BCE. Two pairs of copper clappers from Kish are in the Oriental Institute, and there are two scraper instruments dating to 1500 BCE in the Teheran Archaeological Museum. There is a large, elaborately decorated Assyrian bell in the Berlin Museum. At one time there was a bone whistle recovered from Nimrud, which produced three distinct pitches, but it was subsequently lost.

== Works of music ==
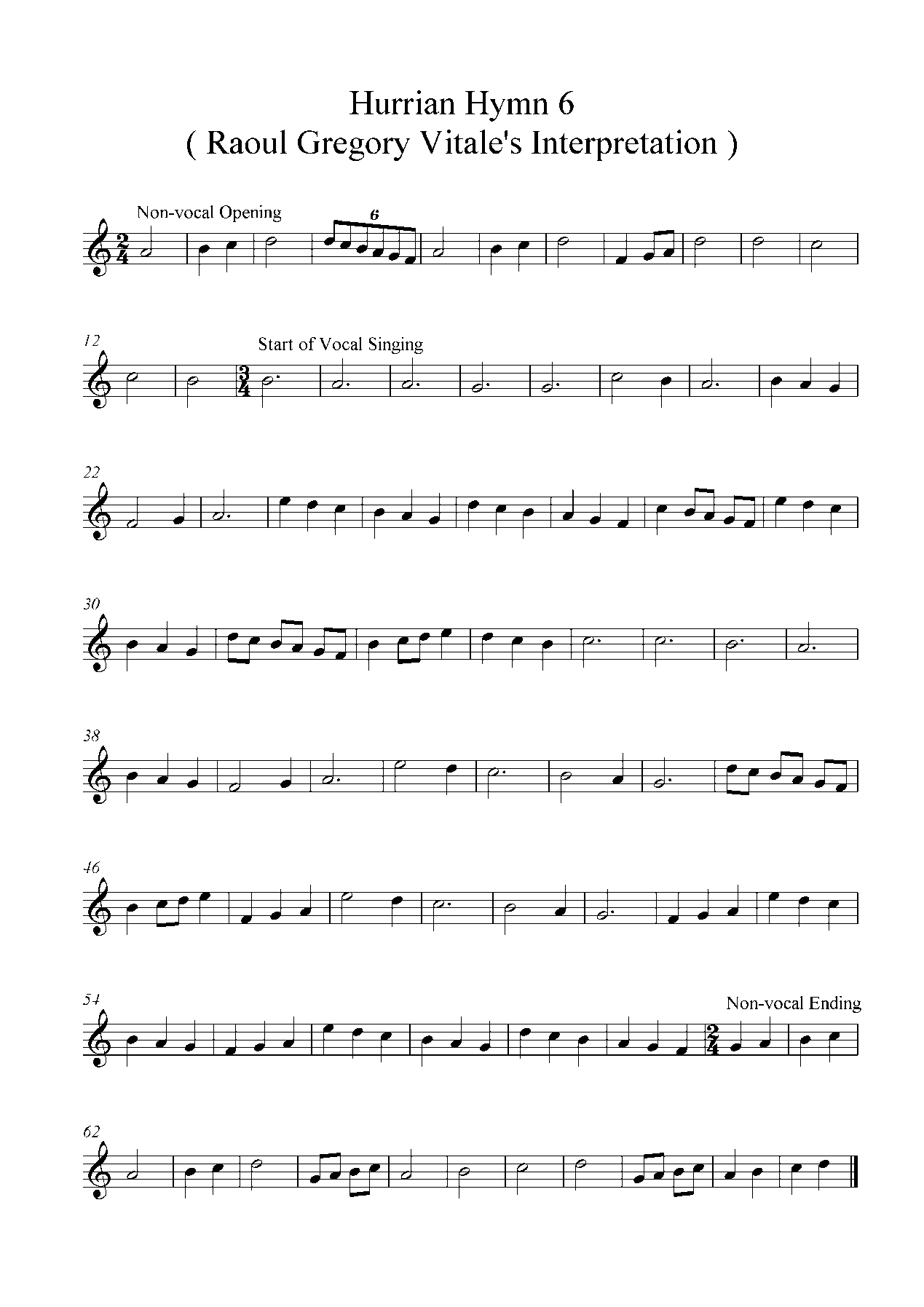
Hurrian Hymn No. 6 interpreted by Raoul Vitale

The most famous surviving works of music are the Hurrian Hymns, (Note: [Tablets RS 15.30, RS 15.49, and RS 17.387]) a collection of music inscribed in cuneiform on clay tablets excavated from the ancient city of Ugarit, modern-day Syria, dating to approximately 1400 BCE. Hurrian Hymn No. 6, the "Hymn to Nikkal", is considered to be the oldest surviving substantially complete written music in the world. At least five interpretations of this tablet have been made in an attempt to reconstruct the music, notably by Anne Draffkorn Kilmer, Marcelle Duchesne-Guillemin, Raoul Vitale, and others. Experts agree on some points, for example, the name of each string of the instrument, its intervals, and its tuning. Nevertheless, each interpretation yields different music. In 2009 Syrian composer Malek Jandali released an album, Echoes from Ugarit, which contains an interpretation of Hurrian Hymn No. 6 on piano accompanied by a full orchestra.

The Hurrian hymns were authored by four composers from Ugarit: Tapšihuni, Puhiya(na), Urhiya, and Ammiya, and were recorded by two scribes, Ammurabi and Ipšali. To notate the music, the scribes used cuneiform, including both words and numerals from the script. The tablets were divided by a double horizontal line; the song's words were written above the lines and the musical notation was written below. The music notation consists of a musical term followed by a numeral. While the musical terms are better understood, including the Hurrian words sa ('string'), ašhu ('upper'), and turi ('lower'), the numerals are more mysterious. It is unclear whether the numeral is meant to represent a tone in the scale, the number of times to repeat a note, or something else.

Although the music for most hymns is lost, their surviving texts provide insight as to how the compositions were organized. These compositions, according to Assyriologist Samuel Noah Kramer, show "a rich variety in both content and structure", and fall into two groups, hymns for the king, and hymns for gods. Kramer details some elements of hymnal organization:

As to structure, the hymns are frequently divided into songs of varying lengths separated from each other by brief antiphonal responses; others consist of a number of four-line strophes. Not a few of the hymns weave a repeated refrain into their contents; still others break up into sections separated by liturgic rubrics of varying types. The hymns were divided by the ancient Sumerian scribes themselves into different groups and categories. At times, not unlike the hymns in the Book of Psalms, these varied with the type of musical instrument which accompanied them.

Furthermore, an Akkadian language tablet from Assur (Note: [Tablet KAR 158 VIII VAT 10101, now in the Berlin Museum]) contains a catalog of song titles organized by genre, including workmen's songs, shepherds' songs, love songs, and songs of youth, although the melodies are lost. Nevertheless, Mesopotamian views of love, sex, and marriage can be inferred from some love songs. In two surviving examples, love songs related to a wedding between a priestess and a king "ring out with passionate love and sexual ecstasy". Kramer infers from the surviving words that some marriages were motivated by sex and love, rather than practical considerations, and relates this fact to a Sumerian proverb: "Marry a wife according to your choice!"

== Music theory ==
A corpus of thousands of surviving clay tablets provides details about ancient Mesopotamian music theory. While some relate to tuning, (Note: [e.g, Tablet U. 7/80]) others relate to musical scales. Mesopotamian art also provides information; the musicologist Curt Sachs describes a relief that depicts the Elamite court orchestra as it welcomes the Assyrian conqueror in 650 BCE:

Its seven harpists are identically depicted, except that they are plucking different strings. As the style is realistic, indeed almost photographic, this cannot be accidental; that variety in that one point cannot be explained by any consideration for design. Each harpist plucks two strings, but the only strings plucked are the fifth, eighth, tenth, fifteenth, and eighteenth of the set. If the instruments, as it is likely to suppose, were tuned to a pentatonic scale – say on C, without half-tones – the plucked notes were A, e, a, e', a', e", that is, a fifth chord orchestrated in the modern way, the two notes being distributed among the seven players in different combinations, as double octave, octave, unison, and fifth.

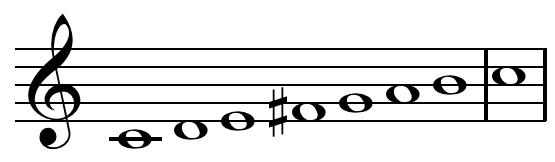
An example of a Lydian scale, a heptatonic, diatonic scale used by the Mesopotamians

2 consecutive tetrachords, heptachord based on D, modal pattern: 1 1/2 1 1 1/2 1

From this relief, Sachs draws three conclusions: (1) that musicians used the pentatonic scale, (2) that different orchestra members played different parts, and (3) that musicians knew how to use chords. Researchers also know that the Mesopotamians used a heptatonic, diatonic scale. They had the concept of musical intervals, including the octave, and understood the circle of fifths. Crickmore postulated heptachord scales.

Tablets reveal words in the Mesopotamian musical vocabulary. (Note: [e.g., Tablet U. 3011, lines 1-15, now in the British Museum]) For example, on a nine-stringed harp, the strings were numbered from one to five, then back down to one: '1st', '2nd', '3rd-thin', 'God-Ea-made-it', '5th', '4th-behind', '3rd-behind', '2nd-behind', and '1st-behind'. In addition, a text composed by Shulgi around 2070 BCE articulates Sumerian technical terms such as 'tuning up' (ZI.ZI), 'tuning down' (ŠÚ.ŠÚ), 'tightening' (GÍD.I), 'loosening' (TU.LU), and the term 'adjust the frets' (SI.AK).

Two surviving tablets (Note: [Tablets UET VI/3 899 and UET VII 74]) give instructions for tuning string instruments. According to O.R. Gurney these tablets are better thought of in terms of re-tuning rather than tuning:

It is more accurate to describe both these texts as "modulation" texts. Essentially, they are instructions that tell a musician how he or she can change a sammû (Note: [a harp or lyre]) instrument's tuning from one "mode" to another. The method of modulation is essentially cyclical. One can proceed either via successive tightening of "unclear" dichords, or conversely via successive loosening of "unclear" dichords.

David Wulstan offers an excerpt from a small fragment of such a text:

If the harp is in išartum tuning,

You have played the qablitum interval

You adjust strings II and IX

And the harp is now in kitmum tuning.

By piecing together such fragments, researchers have been able to come up with what Leon Crickmore called "credible reconstructions" of the Mesopotamian tuning systems for string instruments. Tablets reveal that string instruments were tuned by alternating descending fourths and ascending fifths; this procedure was known to the Greeks as Pythagorean tuning. The seven heptatonic scales (and their Greek equivalents) were: išartu (Dorian), kitmu (Hypodorian), embūbu (Phrygian), pūtu (Hypophrygian), nīd qabli ( Lydian), nīš gabarî (Hypolydian), qablītu (Mixolydian). The Babylonians regarded the tritone as dissonant and called it 'impure'. Marcelle Duchesne-Guillemin lists the four rules that governed the tuning of these instruments:

1. an ascending fifth and a descending fourth are used;

2. the heptachord is a limit not to be exceeded in the alternating process. Hence the alternation is interrupted on the 4th string (the Ea-string) and gives way to a succession of two descending fourths;

3. the first tuning gesture starts on the group of strings after which the mode is named and which is characterized by having the half-tone between its highest two notes;

4. the tuning ends on the tritone. In order to change to the next scale, the tritone is inflected to reach consonance.

Music theory in Mesopotamia was also connected to mathematics and astronomy. For example, an Akkadian language mathematical text (Note: [Tablet CBS 10996]) contains references to musical strings. Musicologist Egon Wellesz suggested that in Mesopotamian thought, numbers represented a sacred force and that the seven notes of their heptatonic scales were symbolically linked to the seven heavenly bodies, including the Sun, Moon, and the five visible planets: (Note: [italics Akkadian]) Šiḫṭu (Mercury), Dilbat (Venus), Ṣalbatānu (Mars), White Star (Jupiter), and Kayyāmānu (Saturn), known from the second millennium BCE. A Babylonian tablet reveals that the Mesopotamians also used another visualization of their heptatonic tuning system: a seven-pointed star. However, knowledge about these Mesopotamian ideas is sparse.

== Influence ==
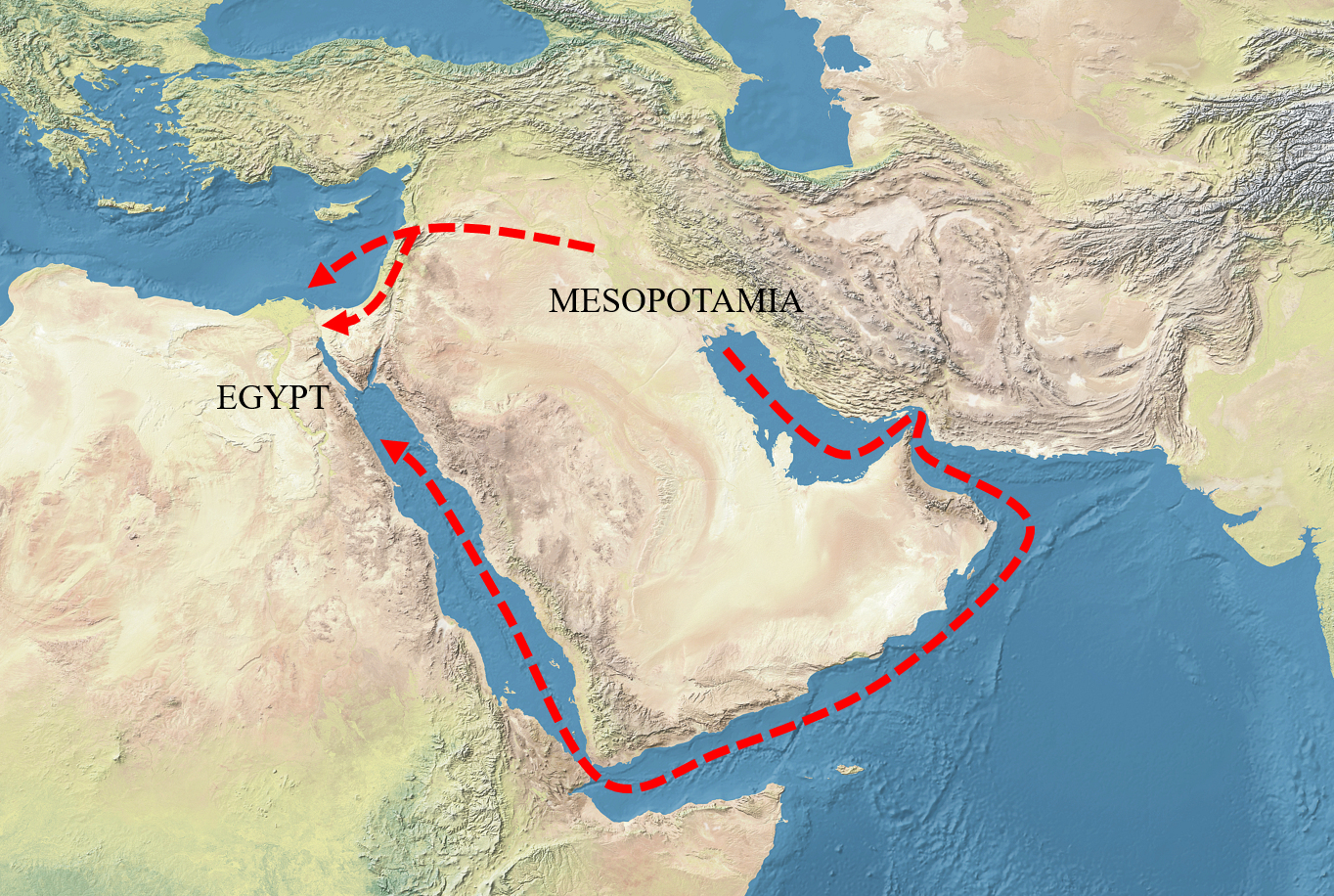
Mesopotamia—Egypt trade routes

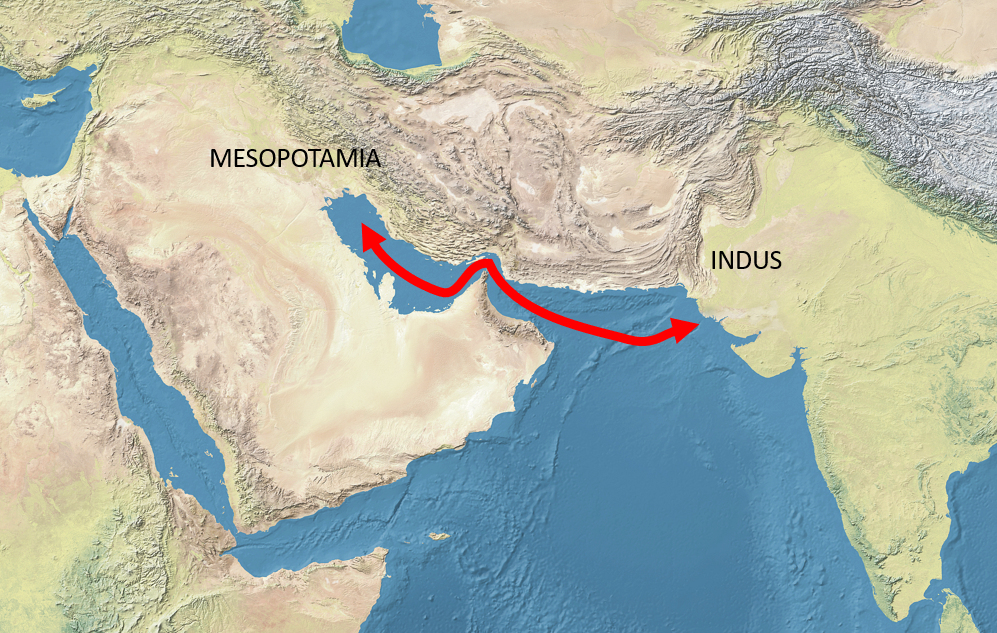
Mesopotamia—Indus trade routes

Mesopotamian music had a lasting and widespread influence on the history of music. Trade routes allowed for the free flow of musical instruments, while classical education spread Mesopotamian musical theory and insights. From 1300 BCE onwards, musician-priests formed guilds and were housed in a temple college, attracting intellectual attention from across the region. Bahrain, home to an independent culture of its own, had connections with both the Indus Valley Civilization to the southeast, and also with Mesopotamia to the north. For much of ancient history, Egypt, Israel, Phoenicia, Syria, Babylonia, Asia Minor, Italy, and Greece together formed what musicologist Claire Polin called a "musical province in which free intercourse created understanding in musical exchange". Musicologist Peter van der Merwe writes:

The harps, lyres, lutes, and pipes of Mesopotamia spread into Egypt, and later into Greece, and, mainly through the Greek influence, to Rome. Via the Roman empire they then made their way into Northern Europe. From Egypt the same instruments spread south and westward into black Africa, where some of them survive to this day.

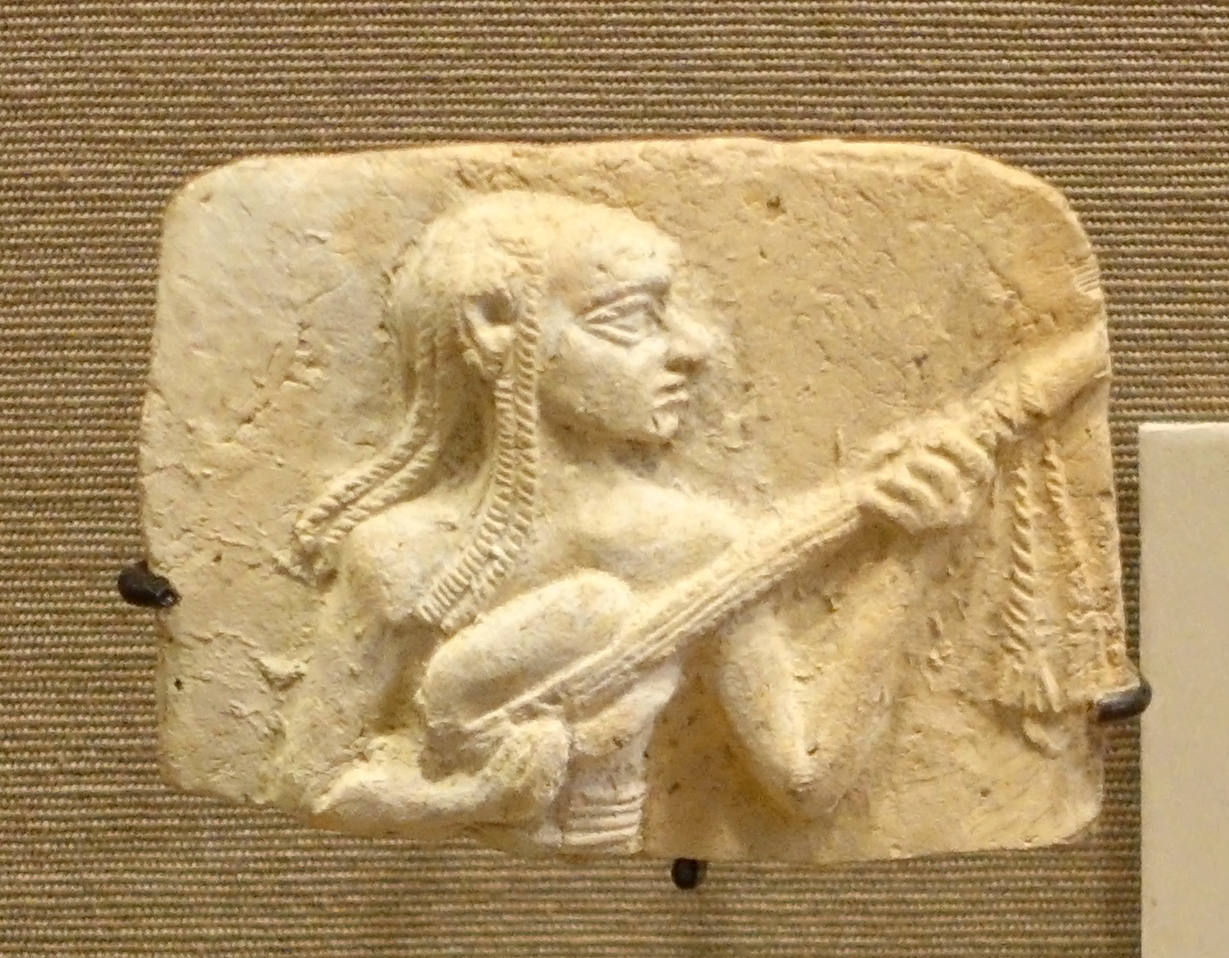
Plaque with musician playing a lute, Isin-Larsa period, 2000-1600 BCE. Ischali, baked clay. Oriental Institute Museum, University of Chicago.

The lute, or sinnitu, may have originated in Mesopotamia, or it may have been introduced from surrounding regions, such as by the Hittites, Hurrians or Kassites, or from the west by nomadic people of the semidesert plains of Syria. It appeared in Mesopotamia about the same time as a similar instrument in Egypt, the nefer. (Note: Khonsura Wilson, professor of African Studies at California State University, Long Beach, writes that the Egyptian Nefer glyph "combines the heart (emotion) and trachea (voice of reason) to give us the concept of beauty.") This instrument became well known throughout the Near East as the tambour, and is comparable to the Sumerian pan-tur, the Greek pandoura, the Russian balalaika, the Georgian tar, and the Arabian oud. The Hebrew flute (halil) is derived from the Akkadian hal-hallatu. Contemporary East African lyres and West African lutes preserve many features of Mesopotamian instruments. Mesopotamian harps diffused as far west as the Mediterranean and as far east as Asia. Ancient Mesopotamian influence in Syriac culture can be seen in the abbūḇā (Syriac: ܐܒܘܒܐ), ṭaḇlā (Syriac: ܛܒܠܐ), p(ə)laggā (Syriac: ܦܠܓܐ), qarnā (Syriac: ܩܪܢܐ), and zemmōrā instruments.

The dulcimer spread throughout the world, its variants and derivatives known in Persia as the santur; in places of Islamic influence (e.g., Egypt, Georgia, Greece, India, and Slovenia) as the senterija; in China and India as yang-ch’in; (Note: [Mandarin for 'foreign string instrument']) in Mongolia as youchin; in Korea as yanggûm; in Thailand as kim; in eastern Europe as kim balon; in western Europe as tympanon; in Britain, North America, and New Zealand as the 'dulcimer' (when struck) or the 'psaltery' (when plucked). While an instrument in the dulcimer family usually consists of a box body with sound holes, derivatives include variations in body size, string length, and string tension, among other characteristics. Variants of the dulcimer are prominent in Persian classical music.

Classical education also helped disseminate musical ideas. The Mesopotamian musical system made up part of the classical education curriculum that scribes, priests and other educated professionals went through, and there were major Mesopotamian music centers at the temples of Babylon, Sippar, Nippur, and Erech. These musical centers became famous in the western world and attracted the attention of the Greeks, including the Pythagoreans, for their musical achievements in addition to those in mathematics and astronomy. This classical education spread abroad during the second millennium BCE, and these musical systems came to represent a common language from which cities abroad could adapt to their local circumstances in syncretism.

For example, pottery in the Mediterranean and Near East showed a common, stereotyped motif — a typical musical ensemble that could be found throughout the region, consisting of lyres, double pipes, and percussion. Variations in this motif show local adaption, for example in ancient Greece the asymmetrical West Semitic lyres are replaced with Hellenistic instruments. Musical terms also appear in connection with religious practices. The Sumerian logogram for 'gala' (kalû in Akkadian) appeared in Hatti, where the word also designated a musician-priest—a type of drummer—and was pronounced as in Hittite as šahtarili. While the gala and šahtarili were both musicians and priests, they were not identical. The Sumerian gala priests were often associated with a third gender category, whereas the šahtarili were typically men; furthermore, there was no Hatti counterpart to Ištar — the two types of priests were involved in the worship of two distinct pantheons.

=== Egypt ===
By the third millennium BCE, music and musicians were depicted in a large number of Egyptian texts. Starting in the New Kingdom, evidence suggests Egypt was influenced by the Babylonians and Hittites, and from the fifteenth century BCE onwards, Egypt adopted the Babylonian vertical angular harp. The Sumerian lyre was introduced to Egypt by nomadic Syrian people, and the Egyptians elaborated upon the design. A seal from Ur dated to 2,800 BCE depicts a small animal playing a pair of clappers; similar clappers appear in ancient Egypt centuries later. Because the lute, harp, and lyre appear significantly earlier in the Near East than in Egypt, it is often assumed that the former introduced them to the latter, but direct evidence is lacking. On the other hand, the sistrum appears in Egypt either before or at the same time as Mesopotamia. The Babylonian lute was introduced to Egypt by way of Asia, from whom the Egyptians also likely inherited their heptatonic system. In the first centuries CE, a certain type of clapper was simultaneously depicted not only in Egypt, but on mosaics in Hama and Carthage, on Roman sarcophagi, on Sasanian silverware, and in Byzantine manuscripts.

=== Persia ===
Like the Mesopotamians, the Persians connected music to the heavens. Bo Lawergren describes an early Iranian seal that depicts a harp rising above the head of a goddess and concludes, "harp and rite were so strongly linked that it was unnecessary to show the player". Nevertheless, they're not identical—while harps shown were similar to those of Mesopotamia, they were used in a secular and more complex setting. Bull-headed lyres also show a heritage; they first flourished in Mesopotamia but spread to Susa, where they retained their strong association with animals. The first lutes appeared in Mesopotamia in 2300 BCE; 1,000 years later lutes would become the favored instrument in Persia. Parthian songs continue to be performed in Iran today. Persia, in turn, influenced the Greeks, Arabs, and Indians.

=== Greece ===
Mesopotamian music had a strong influence in ancient Greece. The practice of deifying string instruments was sometimes echoed in Classical Greece, but the mythology was modified resulting in the Greek 'lyre heroes' such as Orpheus, Amphion, Cadmus and Linus. Like the Mesopotamians, the Greeks connected music to the planets. In the Pythagorean doctrine of the Harmony of the Spheres, the tuning of the lyre was seen as "a microcosm of a universal harmony". (Note: Greek numerology-mysticism has roots in Mesopotamia. This included the Greek fascination with the number seven, especially in supernatural contexts, including in the mythology surrounding the Oracle at Delphi.) Moreover, the Greeks inherited the Mesopotamians' emphasis on the seven-stringed lyre, a seven-pitched scale, and in compositions that focus on the central string, as the Hurrian hymns. Sumerian adornment of lyres with animals was a practice adopted by Greece, which can be seen in the kithara instrument. Greek music, in turn, had a strong influence on Roman music, especially after the Roman conquest of the Greek mainland in 168 BCE; the musical theory inherited by the Romans led to the eight principal modes of Gregorian chant. The modern Western seven-note scales are nearly identical to those used by the Mesopotamians and the Greeks.

=== Modern Iraq ===
Efforts have been made in modern Iraq to preserve the musical culture of Mesopotamia. In the 1970s, during an ideological shift among the Ba'th party toward preservation of pre-Arab cultural heritage, the garment designers and musicians of the Iraqi Fashion House presented "a historical show inspired by the civilizations of Sumer, Akkad, Babylon, Assyria, Basra, Kufa, Baghdad, Samarra and Mosul, dating from past [millennia] to the present day." Performances of a modern dulcimer are frequently featured on Iraqi television. The oud is also still played today. Bassam Salim, an expert oud player and teacher in Baghdad, notes a new interest in the instrument. He says that the oud "represents every special moment in life, from sorrow, sadness, joy and all combinations of emotions ... It's a huge national pride when I feel that through this great instrument, I represent Iraq's cultural history."
