= Balag =

- Cultural origins: Sumer
- Formats: Hymns
- Authors: Priests

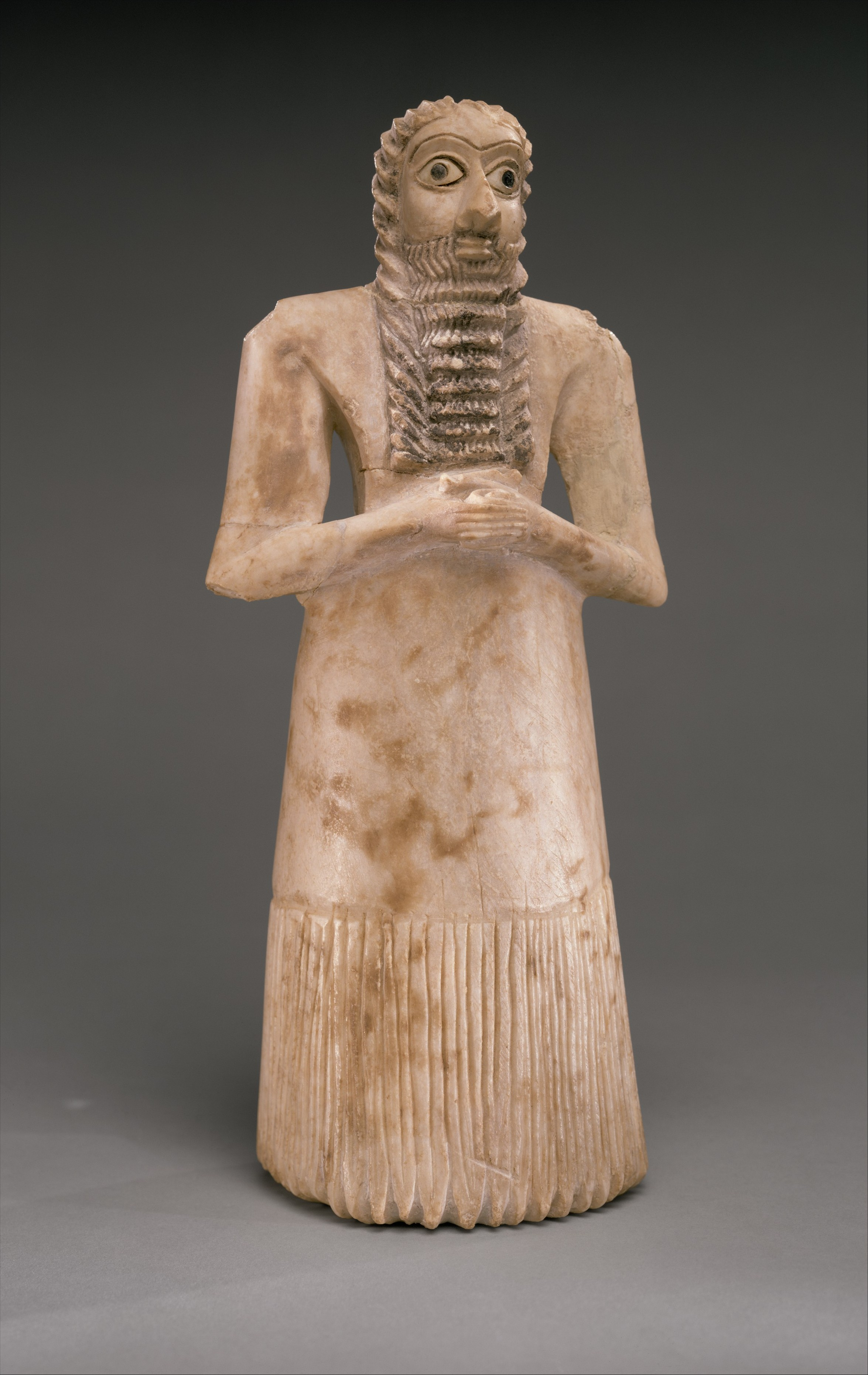
Standing male worshiper, Early Dynastic I-II ca. 2900–2600 BCE, Mesopotamia, Metropolitan Museum of Art

In Mesopotamia, a balag (or balaĝ) refers both to a Sumerian religious literary genre and also to a closely associated musical instrument. In Mesopotamian religion, Balag prayers were sung by a gala priest during temple rituals intended to pacify a deity and avert disaster.

Sometimes the instrument itself was regarded as a minor deity, and every balag had a proper name. Despite the importance of the instrument in the rituals, its identity is disputed, but is generally thought to be either a drum or a string instrument such as a lyre. The purpose of the ritual involving this prayer and instrument was to soothe the local deity with pleasing sounds, while lamenting what may happen to the city should the god decide to abandon it. Balags were used from the Old Babylonian period to the Seleucid Empire.

== Characteristics ==
As a literary genre, the balag was written in the cuneiform script and sung by the Gala priest in a dialect of Sumerian called Emesal (𒅴𒊩 eme-sal). Each balag is composed for a particular god.

The precursor to the balag was the City Lament, a type of prayer that was recited when temples were destroyed and rebuilt. The balag instrument was known to accompany the city lament. Over time, as city laments became associated with scribal schools, the balag was adapted for many different ritual uses. As the city lament became more distant from ritual activity, the balag emerged as a distinct literary genre.

Despite its importance in the rituals, the balag instrument's exact nature is debated. Some scholars regard it as a drum, others a stringed instrument such as a lyre. Others have claimed it is both of these at once, and another theory suggests the word balag started out referring to a lyre, but over the period of several millennia, it came to mean a drum. There were earlier suggestions that it was a bell.

Every balag had a proper name. For example, the names of two balags commissioned by Gudea included ‘Great Dragon of the Land' and 'Lady as Exalted as Heaven'.

The word was loaned into Syriac as p(ə)laggā (Syriac: ܦܠܓܐ), referring to a type of drum.

== See also ==
- Ancient Mesopotamian religion
- Music of Mesopotamia
- Timbrel
