= Galician tambourine =

Musical instrument

Traditional Pandeireta Galega

The Galician tambourine or Pandeireta Galega is a percussion instrument consisting of a wooden hoop that incorporates several metal rattles (ferreñas), whose hollow central part is covered by a skin stretched (usually rabbit or pig). The metal rattles that wave between them make the sound as well as the beating on the leather.

The bigger the tambourine (which depends on the amount of rattles) the deeper the sound. The ferreñas may be arranged in parallel pairs or in line.

The pandeireta is an instrument with its own identity within the traditional Galician music, as it is very common to find groups of pandeireteiras, only using this instrument and voice.

== Playing styles ==
Playing the Galician tambourine requires moving only the right hand, by using the wrist, without moving the arm or the forearm. The left hand hardly moves; players hit the tambourine against the left hand. The position of the hand playing the tambourine is integral to the sound. Although it is now commonly played with an open hand, the hand against which the tambourine is hit was mostly played with a closed fist. There is also a "riscado"/"repenicar" style which means vibrating the tambourine on the leather section.

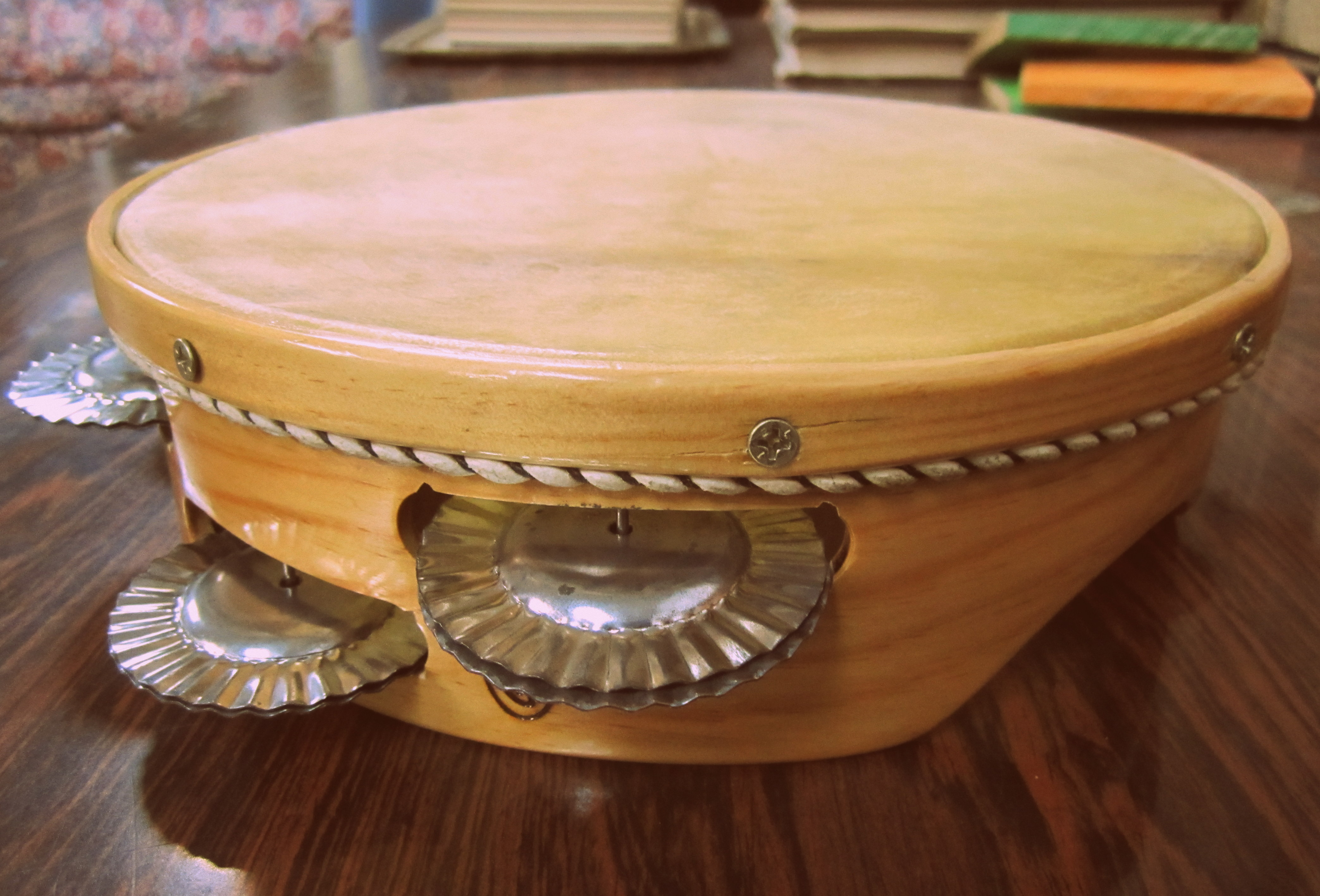
Traditional Galician tambourine from Galicia - Spain.

== See also ==
- Timbrel
- Pandeireta
- Tambourine
