= Timbrel =

Principal percussion instrument of the ancient Israelites

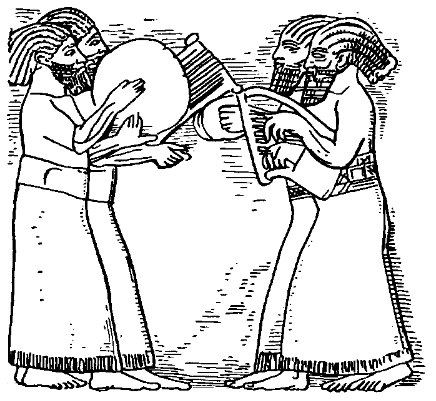
- Assyrian musician depicted playing a timbrel.

Percussion instrument
- Other names: adufe, deff, tabret, tof
- Classification: Frame drum
- Hornbostel–Sachs classification: 211.311 (Directly struck membranophone)

The timbrel or tabret (also known as the tof of the ancient Hebrews, the deff in Arabic, the adufe of the Moors of Portugal) was the principal percussion instrument of the ancient Israelites. It resembled either a frame drum or a modern tambourine.

== Etymology ==
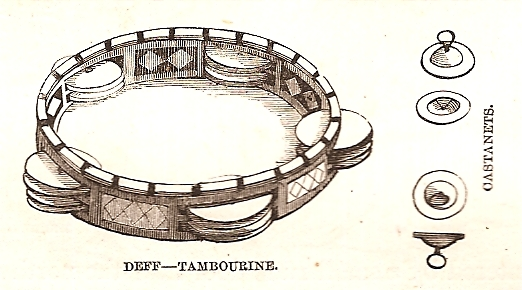
1859 depiction of a "timbrel" or "Judean tof" from Ottoman Palestine, the Hebrew toph can be related to this instrument.

In the Hebrew Bible, the instrument is referred to as "תוף" or "תֹּף" (romanized as either "toph" or "toff"), which is cognate with the Ugaritic word tuppu. It is related to the Hebrew verb "תָּפַף" (romanized as taphaph), meaning "to strike, to play (a drum), or to knock". In Aramaic the terms "duppa" (דפא / ܕܦܐ) was used to refer to a "musical board" and a simple "frame drum" used primarily by women, possibly derived from Sumerian "DAB" (𒁳) which meant "wooden board" and "clapper (musical instrument)".

It is both etymologically and terminologically related to Perso-Arabic word "daf", which is a common Near Eastern name for frame drums that are usually either left simple or fitted with a line of metal rattles attached to the frame, similar to a sistrum.

== History ==
The word timbrel is used in the Hebrew Bible in both singular and plural form, so as to suggest the former referred to a hoop of wood or metal over which was stretched a parchment head; while the latter was perhaps used to designate the tambourine with bells or jangles fixed at intervals in hoops. A tambourine is essentially a wooden frame drum with jangles or bells round the edges. In Nahum 2:7, where the word "tabering" occurs in the King James Version, it means beating on the breast, as drummers beat on the tabret.

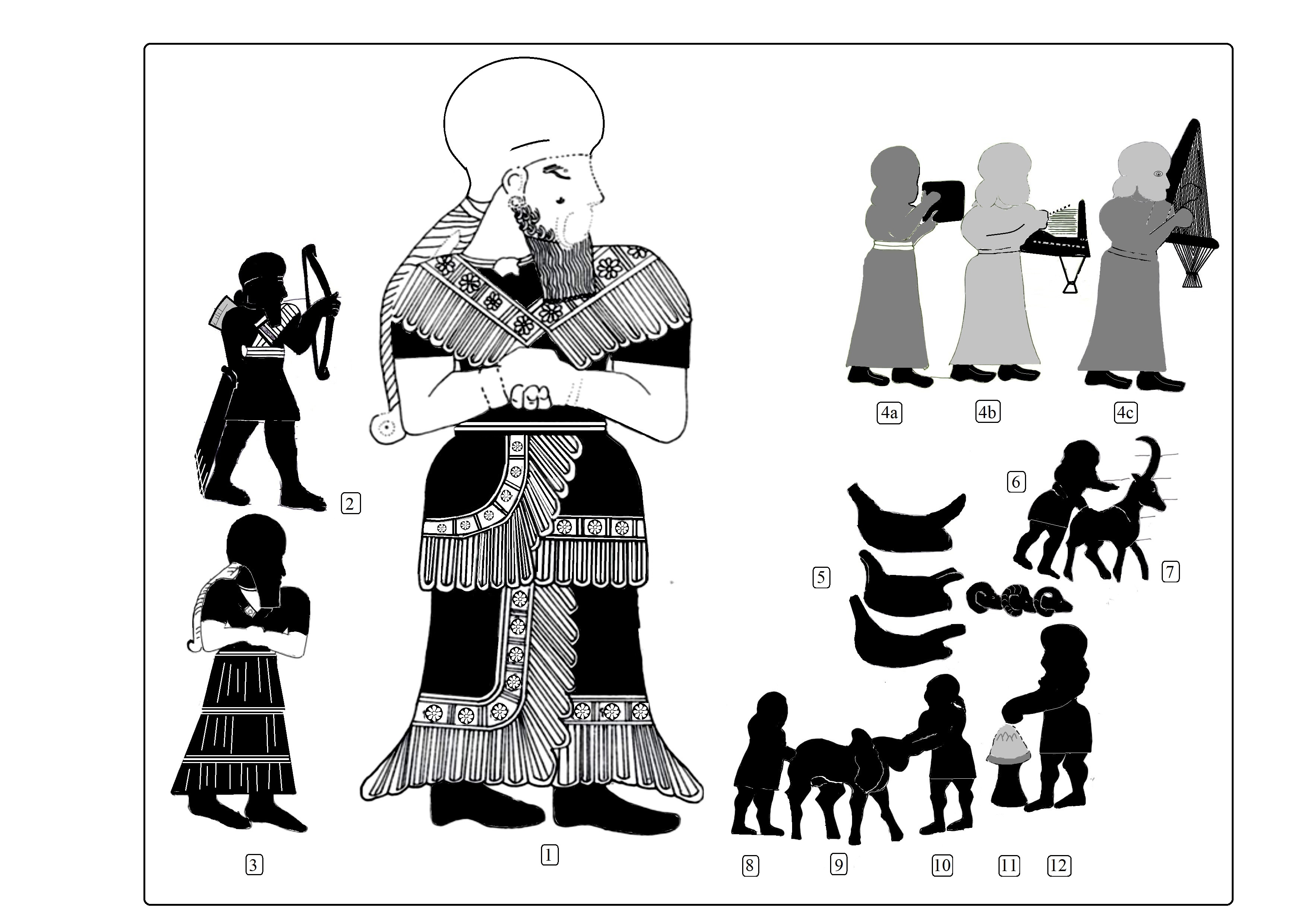
Elamite-era rock relief (from Kul-e Farah) conptemporary with Sumerian timbrel tradition depicting a drummer playing a square shaped timbrel (4a). Reflecting the shape of cuneiform "DAB" (𒁳), square drum known also as "Akkadian adapu".

Drumming in the Bronze Age ancient Near East was primarily associated with women and regarded as a feminine activity. This was reflected in the Song of the Sea (Miriam singing a hymn), in 1 Samuel 18:6–7 with women celebrating David slaying Goliath, and in the account of Jephthah's daughter playing a sorrowful timbrel tune (as she would later be killed in a ritual sacrifice) for Jephthah's victory. This dynamic was also evident in Mesopotamian culture, where the priestly role of playing drums and singing laments was associated with women and the feminine male gala priests of Sumer. Not all timbrel use, however, was associated with femininity; Biblical evidence aligning with temple traditions suggests timbrel playing by men, occurring chronologically after the feminine usage of timbrels, such as in 2 Samuel 6:5 and 1 Chronicles 13:8 with King David playing it before the ark. In 1 Chronicles 15:16 and 2 Chronicles 29:25 it is ordered for temple musicians to play timbrels for praise, which was also reflected in Psalm 149:3 and Psalm 150:4-5, in which scripture explicitly calls people to praise God with timbrels, dancing, and loud-sounding cymbals. That is parallel with the Sumerian distinction of large "Á-LÁ" drums located in the temple that were deemed masculine and played by two men, unlike the small drum of lamentation, and were regarded as having high status:

Large stone stelae of this period show giant drums (Á-LÁ) lying on their sides, with heads as tall as a man. Played by two men in alternating strokes with their hands or with drumsticks, these drums accompanied the dedication ceremonies of royal buildings and other rituals; singers and cymbal players also took part, together with men and women who clapped their hands.

The feminine association of small-framed, non-temple timbrels can also be observed in Egypto-Canaanite clay statuettes, which depict only women playing timbrels and include no men. It is therefore suggested—as corroborated by Egyptian artworks depicting women carrying timbrels in processions and during public ceremonies—that through Syro-Palestinian contact, the feminine use of the timbrel and its associated rituals were introduced to Egypt:

Together, the biblical passages and the Syro-Palestinian terracottas depicting women holding a frame-drum reveal a distinct woman's per-formance tradition involving the hand-drum. There are no other ancient textual references to such a woman's musical genre, but the dis-tribution of the terracottas would indicate that this genre should not be viewed as an exclusively Israelite phenomenon; perhaps it can be called a Canaanite women's musical tradi-tion (Ginsberg 1938). Such a designation would account for the biblical references, since the Israelites are, to some extent, the inheritors and transmitters of Canaanite economic, so-cial and cultural forms. It would also account for the apparent dissemina-tion in the material culture of a female drumming tradition, via the Canaanites/Phoenicians, to Cyprus. A similar tradition may have spread, also via the Canaanites/Phoenicians, to Egypt, where depictions of frame-drum players from the New Kingdom onward are predominantly female (Sachs 1940: 97; Gradenwitz 1949: 40).

In the eleventh edition of the Encyclopædia Britannica, Kathleen Schlesinger stated "it has been suggested that as the Egyptians used it to scare away their evil spirit Typhon", the word tof is suggested to be derived from the latter however modern linguistic evidence suggests Semitic or Sumerian origin of the word that either resembles onomatopoeic sound of a drum, a word meaning "hitting" or a word that originally meant "board" (see etymology section). The tabret or timbrel was a favorite instrument of the women, and was used with dances, as by Miriam, to accompany songs of victory, or with the harp at banquets and processions; it was one of the instruments used by King David and his musicians when he danced before the Ark of the Covenant. It was also used in the valley of Hinnom at the sacrificial rites.

John Keats mentions timbrels in "Ode on a Grecian Urn" (1819): "What pipes and timbrels? What wild ecstasy?"

== See also ==
- Tabor (instrument)
- Balag
