= Raoul Gregory Vitale =

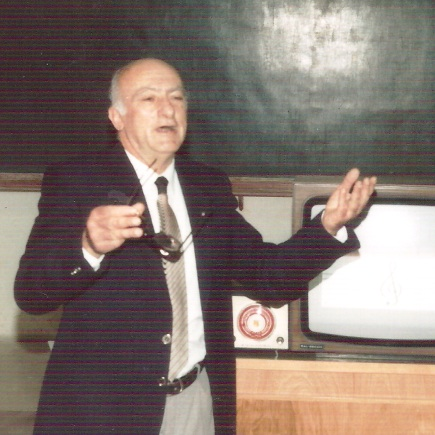
- Raoul Gregory Vitale giving lecture in Tishreen University
- Born: 12 February 1928; Latakia – Syria
- Died: 29 September 2003
- Citizenship: British, Syrian
- Known for: Determination of Babylonian musical scales; Interpretation of Hurrian Hymn-6
- Scientific career
- Fields: Musicology, Ancient history

Raoul Gregory Vitale (12 February 1928 – 29 September 2003) was a Syrian musicologist who introduced the total description of the ancient Babylonian musical scales used in Music of Mesopotamia and Near East, and also a complete interpretation of the musical notation of the Hurrian Hymn 6 discovered in Ugarit which is considered to be the first known complete musical notation.

== Biography ==
Vitale was born in Latakia, Syria, on 12 February 1928. He is the only child of John James Alfred Vitale and Olivia Vitale. His family is of Italian origin and migrated to Syria in the beginning of the 18th century.

Vitale attended the French Frères des écoles chrétiennes school in Latakia for primary, secondary and high school, then he studied physics in the American University of Beirut in Lebanon where he got a master's degree in physical science. He taught physics in the American University of Beirut and in the Lebanese University. He married in Lebanon and had three male children. In 1975, Vitale came back with his family to Latakia, Syria, after the beginning of the Lebanese Civil War, and worked in trading. He died on 29 September 2003.

== Scientific interests ==
Beside physics Vitale was interested in music theory and the ancient history of the Middle East.

In his youth he was a member of the Musical Club in Latakia and the Committee of Ugarit Friends, then the Archaeological Society of Latakia (Adiyat) where he served as the head of the cultural committee for many years.

He studied the ancient history of the Middle East and musical theories as hobbies, and wrote and lectured many essays in those two subjects.

== Works ==
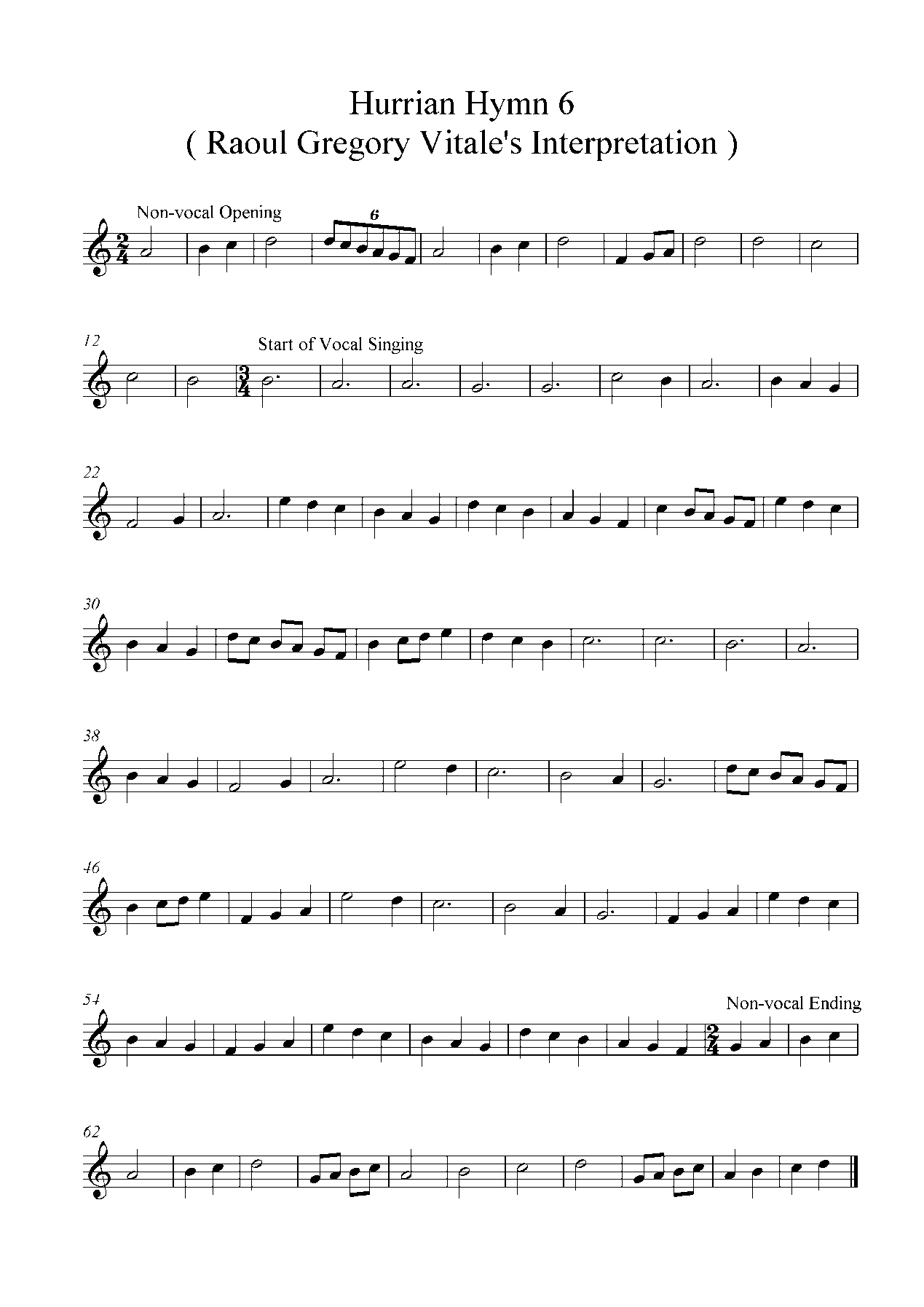
Hurrian hymn 6 interpreted by Raoul Vitale

One of his most remarkable works was the reconsideration of the Babylonian musical scales and giving the first complete description of all of its notes, the work which was accepted widely and confirmed by newer researchers, for example M. L. West and O. R. Gurney. Also very remarkable was giving a new interpretation of the Hurrian Hymn 6 (see Hurrian songs) which is the most ancient musical notation known, giving the first complete interpretation.

Among his other researches was a study on the order of the Ugaritic alphabet which was the basis of the Greek, Latin and Arabic alphabets orders.

== Published researches ==
- La tablette musical H-6. Archeologiques Arabe Syriennes 29 – 30 (1979–1980)
- La Musique suméro-accadienne: gamme et notation musicale. Ugarit-Forschungen 14 (1982): 241–63.
- أقدم موسيقا معروفة في العالم". الحياة الموسيقية العدد 2 سنة 1993 والعدد 6 سنة 1994"

== Other researches given as lectures ==
- Arabs in Syria before Islam
- Formal symmetry of the Ugaritic letters
- Shapes and order of the Ugaritic letters
- Number through history – The invention and progression of numbers calligraphy
- Semites or not
- Keninites
- Ugarit not Keninite nor Phoenician

In addition to many educational lectures in the fields of physics, mathematics, history and music. Also he has participated in many cultural conferences and events.

== See also ==
- Hurrian songs
- Music of Mesopotamia
