= Hurrian songs =

Collection of music dating from approximately 1400 BCE

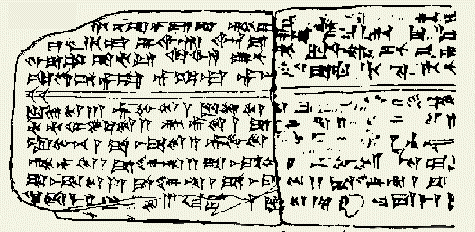
A drawing of one side of the tablet on which the Hymn to Nikkal is inscribed

The Hurrian songs (or Hurrian Hymns) are a collection of music written in cuneiform on clay tablets excavated from the ancient city of Ugarit, a headland in northern Syria, which date to approximately 1400 BCE. One of these tablets, which is nearly complete, contains the Hurrian Hymn to Nikkal (also known as the Hurrian cult hymn or "a zaluzi-prayer to the gods," or simply "h.6"), making it the oldest surviving substantially complete work of notated music in the world. While the composers' names of some of the fragmentary pieces are known, h.6 is an anonymous work.

== History ==
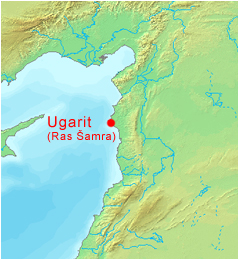
Ugarit, where the Hurrian songs were found

The complete song is one of about 36 such hymns in cuneiform writing, found on fragments of clay tablets excavated in the 1950s from the Royal Palace at Ugarit (present-day Ras Shamra, Syria), in a stratum dating from the fourteenth century BCE, but is the only one surviving in substantially complete form.

An account of the group of shards was first published in 1955 and 1968 by Emmanuel Laroche, who identified as parts of a single clay tablet the three fragments catalogued by the field archaeologists as RS 15.30, 15.49, and 17.387. In Laroche's catalogue, the hymns are designated h. (for ”Hurrian”) 2–17, 19–23, 25–6, 28, 30, along with smaller fragments RS. 19.164 g, j, n, o, p, r, t, w, x, y, aa, and gg. The complete hymn is h.6 in this list. A revised text of h.6 was published in 1975.

Following Laroche's work, Assyriologist Anne Draffkorn Kilmer and musicologist Marcelle Duchesne-Guillemin worked together in the 1970s to understand the meaning of the tablets, concluding that one tablet presented tuning methods for a Babylonian lyre, another referred to musical intervals.

Tablet h.6 contains the lyrics for a hymn to Nikkal, an Ancient Near Eastern goddess of orchards, and instructions for a singer accompanied by a nine-stringed sammûm, a type of harp or, much more likely, a lyre. The hymn was given its first modern performance in 1974, a performance of which The New York Times wrote: "This has revolutionized the whole concept of the origin of western music."

The Hurrian hymn pre-dates several other surviving early works of music (e.g., the Seikilos epitaph and the Delphic Hymns) by a millennium, and the reconstruction of the music has improved over time. The first reconstructions interpreted the musical scale upside down, with the highest tones incorrectly becoming the lowest. In parallel, attempts to map the lyrics onto the music led historians to try to extend the music. Duchesne-Guillemin's reconstruction may be heard at the Urkesh webpage, though this is only one of at least five "rival decipherments of the notation, each yielding entirely different results". These reconstructions (not decipherments in the correct sense of the word, because the script is well understood and mostly unambiguous) illustrate the history of research and the improvements as well as failures made over time.

The tablet is in the collection of the National Museum of Damascus.

== Notation ==
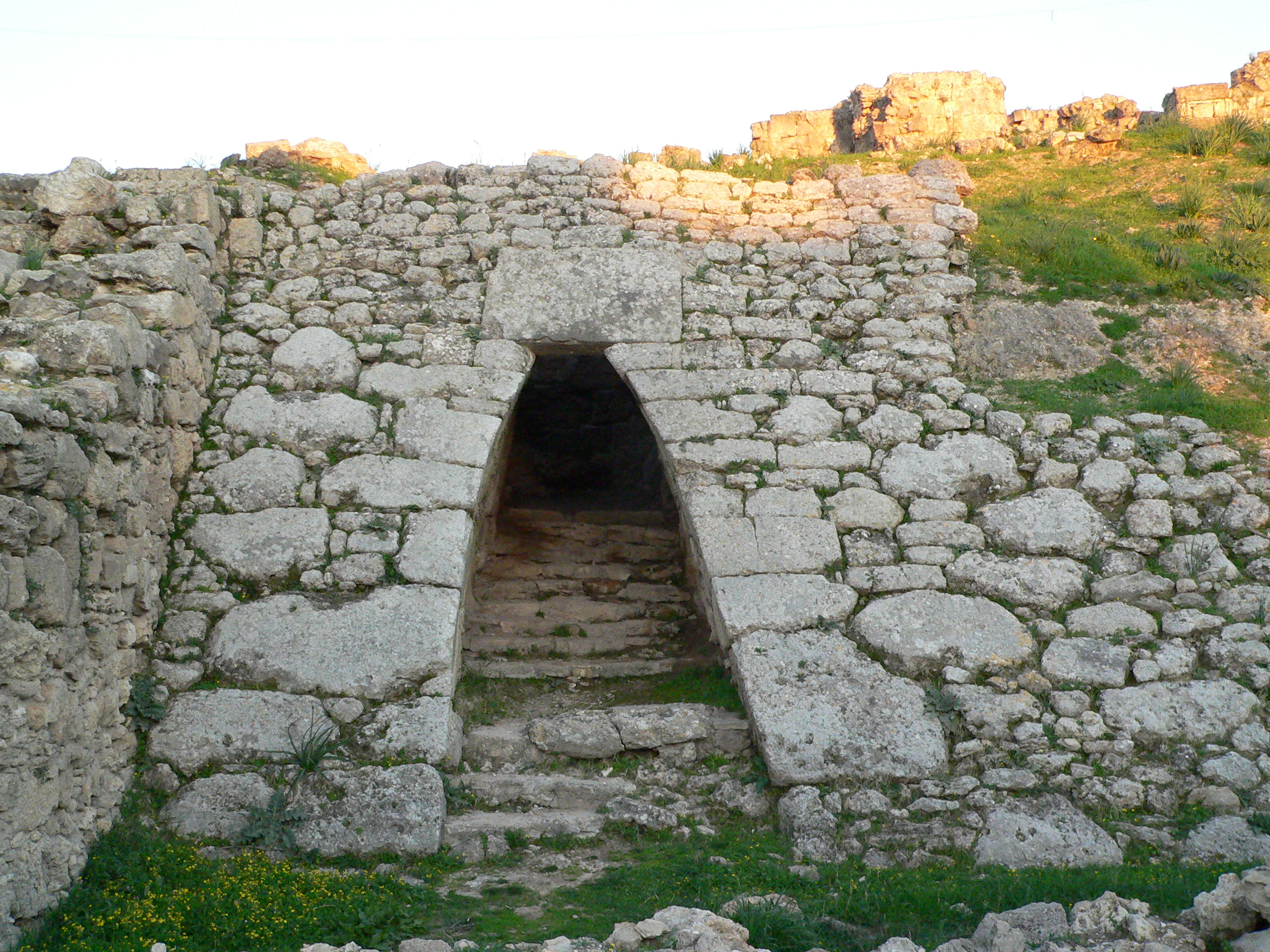
An entrance to the royal palace at Ugarit, where the Hurrian songs were found

The arrangement of tablet h.6 places the Hurrian words of the hymn at the top, under which is a double division line. The hymn text is written in a continuous spiral, alternating recto-verso sides of the tablet—a layout not found in Babylonian texts. Below this is found the Akkadian musical instructions, consisting of interval names followed by number signs. Differences in transcriptions hinge on interpretation of the meaning of these paired signs, and the relationship to the hymn text. Below the musical instructions there is another dividing line—single this time—underneath which is a colophon in Akkadian reading "This [is] a song [in the] nitkibli [i.e., the nid qabli tuning], a zaluzi … written down by Ammurabi". This name and another scribe's name found on one of the other tablets, Ipsali, are both Semitic. There is no composer named for the complete hymn, but four composers' names are found for five of the fragmentary pieces: Tapšiẖuni, Puẖiya(na), Urẖiya (two hymns: h.8 and h.12), and Ammiya. These are all Hurrian names.

The Akkadian cuneiform music notation refers to a diatonic scale on a nine-stringed lyre, in a tuning system described on three Akkadian tablets, two from the Late Babylonian and one from the Old Babylonian period (approximately the 18th century BCE). Babylonian theory describes intervals of thirds, fourths, fifths, and sixths, but only with specific terms for the various groups of strings that may be spanned by the hand over that distance, within the purely theoretical range of a seven-string lyre (even though the actual instrument described has nine strings). Babylonian theory had no term for the abstract distance of a fifth or a fourth—only for fifths and fourths between specific pairs of strings. As a result, there are fourteen terms in all, describing two pairs spanning six strings, three pairs spanning five, four pairs spanning four, and five different pairs spanning three strings. (Note: A single note could be represented simply with the name of that string; terms for intervals of a seventh have been identified in Babylonian texts but do not appear at Ugarit.) The names of these fourteen pairs of strings form the basis of the theoretical system and are arranged by twos in the ancient sources (string-number pairs first, then the regularized Old Babylonian names and translations):

1–5 nīš tuḫrim (raising of the heel), formerly read nīš gab(a)rîm (raising of the counterpart)

7–5 šērum (tune/sound/song)

2–6 išartum (straight/in proper condition)

1–6 šalšatum (third)

3–7 embūbum (reed-pipe)

2–7 rebûttum (fourth)

4–1 nīd qablim (casting down of the middle)

1–3 isqum (lot/portion)

5–2 qablītum (middle)

2–4 titur qablītim (bridge of the middle)

6–3 kitmum (covering/closing)

3–5 titur išartim (bridge of the išartum)

7–4 pītum (opening)

4–6 ṣ/zerdum (loosening/gripping)

The name of the first item of each pair is also used as the name of a tuning. These are all fifths (nīš gab(a)rîm, išartum', embūbum') or fourths (nīd qablim, qablītum, kitmum, and pītum), and have been called by one modern scholar the "primary" intervals—the other seven (which are not used as names of tunings) being the "secondary" intervals: thirds and sixths.

A transcription of the first two lines of the notation on h.6 reads:

qáb-li-te 3 ir-bu-te 1 qáb-li-te 3 ša-aḫ-ri 1 i-šar-te 10 uš-ta-ma-a-ri
ti-ti-mi-šar-te 2 zi-ir-te 1 ša-[a]ḫ-ri 2 ša-aš-ša-te 2 ir-bu-te 2.

Hypothetical chord progression of the first two lines of the notation on tablet h.6

It was the unsystematic succession of the interval names, their location below apparently lyric texts, and the regular interpolation of numerals that led to the conclusion that these were notated musical compositions. Some of the terms differ to varying degrees from the Akkadian forms found in the older theoretical text, which is not surprising since they were foreign terms. For example, irbute in the hymn notation corresponds to rebûttum in the theory text, šaḫri = šērum, zirte = ṣ/zerdum, šaššate = šalšatum, and titim išarte = titur išartim. There are also a few rarer, additional words, some of them apparently Hurrian rather than Akkadian. Because these interrupt the interval-numeral pattern, they may be modifiers of the preceding or following named interval. The first line of h.6, for example, ends with ušta mari, and this word-pair is also found on several of the other, fragmentary hymn tablets, usually following but not preceding a numeral.

== Text ==
The text of h.6 is difficult, in part because the Hurrian language itself is imperfectly understood, and in part because of small lacunae due to missing flakes of the clay tablet. In addition, however, it appears that the language is a local Ugarit dialect, which differs significantly from the dialects known from other sources. It is also possible that the pronunciation of some words was altered from normal speech because of the music. Despite the many difficulties, it is clearly a religious text concerning offerings to the goddess Nikkal, wife of the moon god. The text is presented in four lines, with the peculiarity that the seven final syllables of each of the first three lines on the verso of the tablet are repeated at the beginning of the next line on the recto. While Laroche saw in this a procedure similar to one employed by Babylonian scribes in longer texts to provide continuity at the transition from one tablet to another, Güterbock and Kilmer took the position that this device is never found within the text on a single tablet, and so these repeated syllables must constitute refrains dividing the text into regular sections. To this, Duchesne-Guillemin retorts that the recto-verso-recto spiral path of the text—an arrangement unknown in Babylon—is ample reason for the use of such guides.

The first published attempt to interpret the text of h.6 was made in 1977 by Hans-Jochen Thiel, and his work formed the basis for a new but still very provisional attempt made 24 years later by Theo J. H. Krispijn, after Hurritology had made significant progress thanks to archaeological discoveries made in the meantime at a site near Boğazkale.

== Discography ==
- Music of the Ancient Sumerians, Egyptians & Greeks, new expanded edition. Ensemble De Organographia (Gayle Stuwe Neuman and Philip Neuman). CD recording. Pandourion PRDC 1005. Oregon City: Pandourion Records, 2006. [Includes the nearly complete h.6 (as "A Zaluzi to the Gods"), as well as fragments of 14 others, following the transcriptions of M. L. West.]

== See also ==
- Seikilos epitaph
- Hittite music
- Raoul Gregory Vitale
- Malek Jandali
- Music of Mesopotamia
