= Gala (priests) =

Priests of the Sumerian goddess Inanna

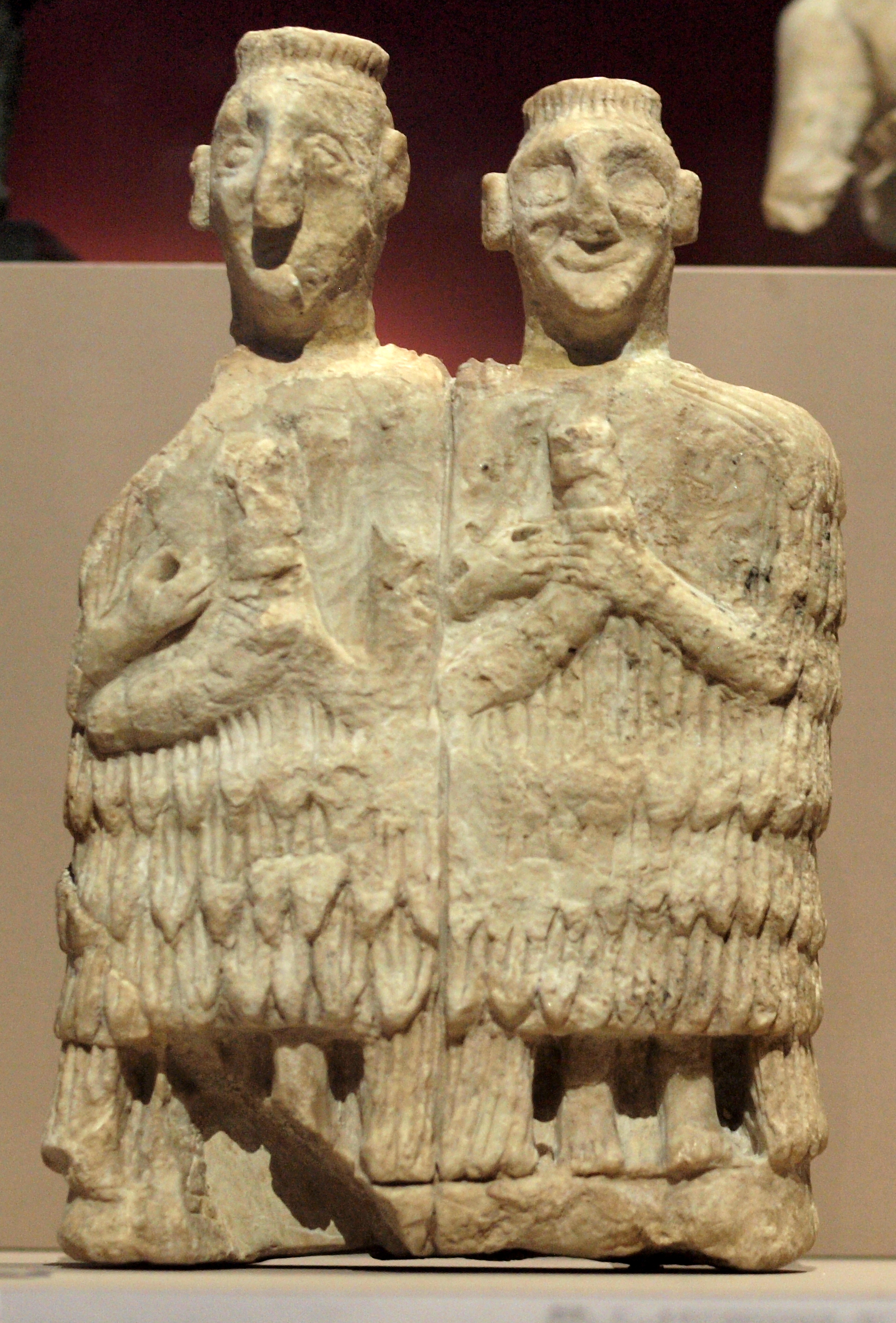
Ancient Sumerian statuette of two gala priests, dating to c. 2450 BC, found in the temple of Inanna at Mari

The Gala (Sumerian: 𒍑𒆪, romanized: gala, Akkadian: kalû) were priests of the Sumerian goddess Inanna. They made up a significant number of the personnel of both temples and palaces, the central institutions of Mesopotamian city-states.

Originally specialists in singing lamentations, gala appear in temple records dating back from the middle of the 3rd millennium BC. According to an old Babylonian text, the god Enki created the gala specifically to sing "heart-soothing laments" for the goddess Inanna. Cuneiform references indicate the gendered character of the role. Lamentation and wailing may have originally been female professions, so that the males who entered the role adopted its more feminine forms. Their hymns were sung in a Sumerian dialect known as eme-sal, normally used to render the speech of female gods, and some gala took feminine names and roles.

Homosexual proclivities are implied by a Sumerian proverb which reads, "When the gala wiped off his anus [he said], ‘I must not arouse that which belongs to my mistress [i.e., Inanna]’ ". In fact, the word gala was written using the sign sequence UŠ.KU, the first sign having also the reading g̃iš_{3} ("penis") & nita ("male"), and the second one bed_{3} ("anus") & dur_{2} ("buttocks"), meaning that might be a pun involved. Moreover, gala is homophonous with gal_{4}-la (𒊩𒆷) meaning "vulva".

There are references to their 'effeminate' character (especially in the Sumerian proverbs), many administrative texts make mention of heterosexual gala who had children, wives, and large families. In addition, some gala priests were women.

== See also ==
- Enaree
- Galli
- Hijra

== Sources ==
- Al-Rawi, F. N. H. 1992. "Two Old Akkadian Letters Concerning the Offices of kala'um and närum." In Zeitschrift für Assyriologie 82.
- Bottéro, Jean, and H. Petschow. 1975. "Homosexualität." In Reallexikon der Assyriologie und Vorderasiatischen Archäologie 4:459b–468b.
- Cohen, Mark. 1974. Balag-Compositions: Sumerian lamentation liturgies of the second and first millennium B.C. Sources from the Ancient Neat East, volume 1, fasc. 2.
- Carl S. Ehrlich (2009). From an Antique Land: An Introduction to Ancient Near Eastern Literature. Rowman & Littlefield Publishers. ISBN 978-0742563476.
- Gelb, I. J. 1975. "Homo ludens in early Mesopotamia." In Haec studia orientalia professori Assyriologia, et filologiae Semiticae in Universitate Helsingensi Armas I. Salonen, S.Q.A.: Anno 1975 sexagenario, 43–76. Studia Orientalia 46.
- Gordon, Edmund. 1959. Sumerian proverbs: Glimpses of everyday life in ancient Mesopotamia.
- Hartmann, Henrike. 1960. Die Musik der Sumerischen Kultur.
- Henshaw, Richard A. 1994. Male and female, the cultic personnel: The Bible and the rest of the ancient Near East. Princeton Theological Monograph Series 31.
- Kramer, Samuel N. 1981. History begins at Sumer: Thirty-nine firsts in man's recorded history. Rev. ed.
- Krecher, Joachim. 1966. Sumerische Kultlyrik.
- Lambert, Wilfried G. 1992. "Prostitution." Xenia 32:127-57.
- Michalowski, Piotr et al. (eds.). 2006. Approaches to Sumerian Literature: Studies in Honor of Stip (H. L. J. Vanstiphout).
- Stephen O. Murray; Will Roscoe, eds. (1997). Islamic Homosexualities: Culture, History, and Literature. NYU Press. ISBN 0814774687.
- Renger, Johannes. 1969. "Untersuchungen zum Priestertum der altbabylonischen Zeit, 2. Teil." Zeitschrift zur Assyriologie 59 (n.f. 25).
- Steinkeller, Piotr. 1992. Third-millennium legal and administrative texts in the Iraq Museum, Baghdad.
- Ann Suter (2008). Lament: Studies in the Ancient Mediterranean and Beyond. Oxford University Press. ISBN 978-0199714278.
