= Song of the hoe =

Sumerian creation myth

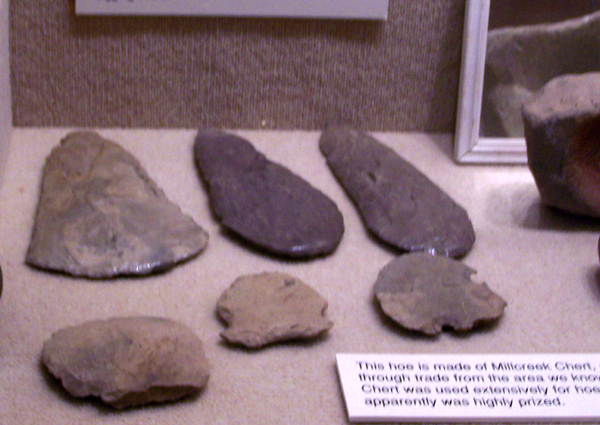
Late Mississippian hoes, similar in appearance to the first Near Eastern hoes.

The Song of the hoe, sometimes also known as the Creation of the pickaxe or the Praise of the pickaxe, is a Sumerian creation myth, written on clay tablets from the last century of the 3rd millennium BCE.

== Genre ==
The Song of the hoe is one of several known Sumerian disputations. Other examples from this genre include: The Debate between sheep and grain; The Debate between bird and fish; the Debate between Winter and Summer; and The Debate between silver and copper, etc. The debates, stretching back to the late 3rd millennium BC, are philosophical and address humanity's place in the world. The Song of the hoe stands alone in its own sub-category as a one-sided debate poem.

== Inscriptions and translations ==
Three tablets of the myth are held by the British Museum, numbers 80170, 132243 (unpublished) and 139993. Two tablets of the myth are held by the Louvre in Paris, number AO 7087 & AO 8898. One is held in the Vorderasiatisches Museum Berlin, number 17378 and three at the Yale Babylonian collection, numbers 5487, 7070 and 11941. Lines of the myth were discovered on the University of Pennsylvania Museum of Archaeology and Anthropology, catalogue of the Babylonian section (CBS), from their excavations at the temple library at Nippur. Tablets from this collection, numbers 8111, 13122, 13382 and 13864 were documented by Edward Chiera in "Sumerian Epics and Myths". Samuel Noah Kramer included CBS tablets 8531, 10310, 10335, 29.16.23, 29.16.436. He also included translations from tablets in the Nippur collection of the Museum of the Ancient Orient in Istanbul, catalogue numbers 1117, 2337, 2473, 2742. Other tablets were added from the "Ur excavations texts" in 1928 along with several others to bring it to its present form, which is virtually complete. The latest composite text and translation was produced in 1996 by H. Behrens, B. Jagersma and Joachim Krecher.

== Story ==
The poem is composed of the frequent use of the word "al", which means hoe. The verb-forms and nouns also frequently start with, or contain the syllable "al" (or "ar"), suggesting the writer intended it for humour as a satirical school text or as a tongue-twister. The song starts with a creation myth where Enlil, god of the earth, separates heaven and earth from the point of the world-axis, Duranki:

"Not only did the lord make the world appear in its correct form, the lord who never changes the destinies which he determines – Enlil – who will make the human seed of the Land come forth from the earth – and not only did he hasten to separate heaven from earth, and hasten to separate earth from heaven, but, in order to make it possible for humans to grow in "where flesh came forth" [the name of a cosmic location], he first raised the axis of the world at Dur-an-ki."

The myth continues with a description of Enlil creating daylight with his hoe; he goes on to praise its construction and creation. Enlil's mighty hoe is said to be made of gold, with the blade made of lapis lazuli and fastened by cord. It is inlaid with lapis lazuli and adorned with silver and gold. Enlil makes civilized man, from a brick mould with his hoe – and the Annunaki start to praise him. Nisaba, Ninmena, and Nunamnir start organizing things. Enki praises the hoe; they start reproducing and Enlil makes numerous shining hoes, for everyone to begin work. Enlil then founds the Ekur with his hoe whilst a "god-man" called Lord Nudimmud builds the Abzu in Eridug. Various gods are then described establishing construction projects in other cities, such as Ninhursag in Kesh, and Inanna and Utu in Zabalam; Nisaba and E-ana also set about building. The useful construction and agricultural uses of the hoe are summarized, along with its capabilities for use as a weapon and for burying the dead. Allusions are made to the scenes of Enkidu's ghost, and Urshanabi's ferry over the Hubur, in the Epic of Gilgamesh:

"dead people are also brought up from the ground by the hoe. With the hoe, the hero honoured by An, the younger brother of Nergal, the warrior Gilgamesh – is as powerful as a hunting net. The sage son of Ninsumun is pre-eminent with oars. With the hoe, he is the great "kindajal" of the watercourses."

Ninmena is suggested to create both the priestess and king. The hymn ends with extensive praisings of the hoe, Enlil, and Nisaba:

"The hoe makes everything prosper; the hoe makes everything flourish. The hoe is good barley; the hoe is an overseer. The hoe is brick moulds; the hoe has made people exist. It is the hoe that is the strength of young manhood. The hoe and the basket are the tools for building cities. It builds the right kind of house; it cultivates the right kind of fields. It is you, hoe, that extend the good agricultural land!"

== Discussion ==
Modern society may have trouble comprehending the virtue of extolling a tool such as the lowly hoe, for the Sumerians the implement had brought agriculture, irrigation, drainage and the ability to build roads, canals and eventually the first proto-cities. One of the tablets from the Yale Babylonian Collection was published by J.J. Van Dijk which spoke of three cosmic realms; heaven, earth and kur in a time when darkness covered an arid land, when heaven and earth were joined and the Enlil's universal laws, the me did not function. Two of the major traditions of the Sumerian concept of the creation of man are discussed in the myth. The first is the creation of mankind from brick moulds or clay. This has notable similarities to the creation of man from the dust of the earth in the Book of Genesis in the Bible (Genesis 2:6–7). This activity has also been associated with creating clay figurines. The second Sumerian tradition which compares men to plants, made to "break through the ground", an allusion to imagery of the fertility or mother goddess and giving an image of man being "planted" in the ground. Wayne Horowitz notes that five Sumerian myths recount a creation scene with the separation of heaven and earth. He further notes the figurative imagery relaying the relationship between the creation of agricultural implements making a function for mankind and thereby its creation from the "seed of the land". The myth was called the "Creation of the Pickax" by Samuel Noah Kramer, a name by which it is referred in older sources. In Sumerian literature, the hoe or pickaxe is used not only in creation of the Ekur but also described as the tool of its destruction in city-lament hymns such as the Lament for Ur, where it is torn apart with a storm and then pickaxes.

The cosmological position of the hoe does not fit into Charles Long's categorization of cosmogenic myths. Creation has been suggested to have been the responsibility of different gods via different processes. Creation via a cosmological agricultural implement seems to occupy a unique place in the creation myth genre. The song was meant to be sung aloud with the repetition of the word hoe or "al" a total of forty five times in the text with common use of the two syllables together "al"/"ar". A cosmological link is suggested between the hoe's being and its doing; making everything prosper and flourish within a community. Gary Martin discusses the sociological benefits of singing songs to a hoe, to remind people that they wield the implement of Enlil and of creation. That they can participate in creativity and work well to preserve and improve society. He suggests that "perhaps by praising the simple tool of an extremely important group of laborers, and imbuing it with cosmological significance, those wielders of the hoe are themselves brought into a grand cosmological drama."

== See also ==
- Barton Cylinder
- Debate between sheep and grain
- Debate between bird and fish
- Debate between Winter and Summer
- Enlil and Ninlil
- Eridu Genesis
- Self-praise of Shulgi (Shulgi D)
- Old Babylonian oracle
- Hymn to Enlil
- Kesh temple hymn
- Lament for Ur
- Sumerian disputations
- Sumerian religion
- Sumerian literature
