= Garden of the gods (Sumerian paradise) =

Concept in Mesopotamian mythology

The concept of a garden of the gods or a divine paradise may have originated in Sumer. This concept of the home of the immortals was later handed down to the Babylonians, who conquered Sumer.

== Location ==
=== Persian Gulf ===
A Sumerian paradise is usually associated with the Dilmun civilization of Eastern Arabia. Sir Henry Rawlinson first suggested the geographic location of Dilmun was in Bahrain in 1880. This theory was later promoted by Friedrich Delitzsch in his book Wo lag das Paradies in 1881, suggesting that it was at the head of the Persian Gulf. Various other theories have been put forward on this theme. Dilmun is first mentioned in association with Kur (mountain) and this is particularly problematic as Bahrain is very flat, having a highest prominence of only 134 metres (440 ft) elevation. Also, in the early epic Enmerkar and the Lord of Aratta, the construction of the ziggurats in Uruk and Eridu are described as taking place in a world "before Dilmun had yet been settled". In 1987, Theresa Howard-Carter realized that the locations in this area possess no archaeological evidence of a settlement dating 3300-2300 BC. She proposed that Dilmun could have existed in different eras and the one of this era might be a still unidentified tell.

=== Lebanon and Mount Hermon ===
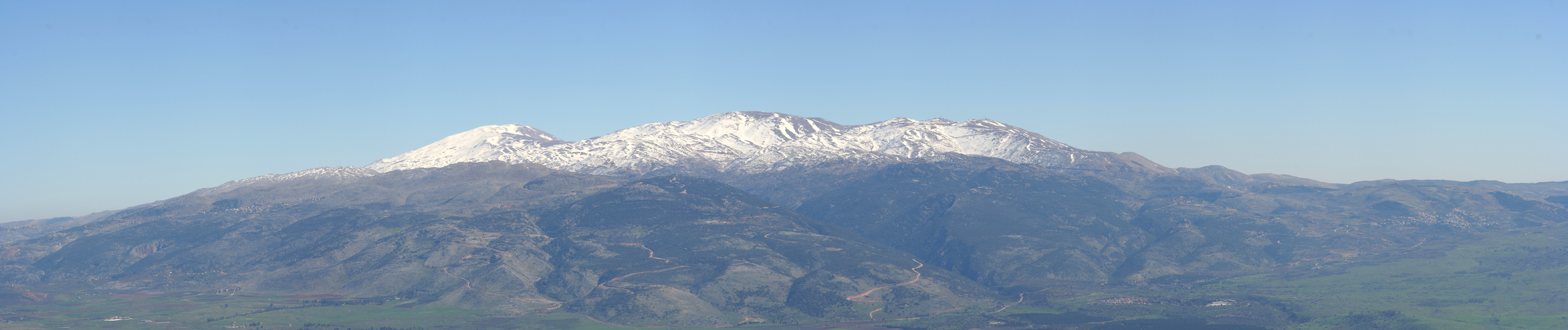
Mount Hermon

In tablet nine of the standard version of the Epic of Gilgamesh, Gilgamesh travels to the garden of the gods through the Cedar Forest and the depths of Mashu, a comparable location in Sumerian version is the "mountain of cedar-felling". Little description remains of the "jewelled garden" of Gilgamesh because twenty four lines of the myth were damaged and could not be translated at that point in the text.

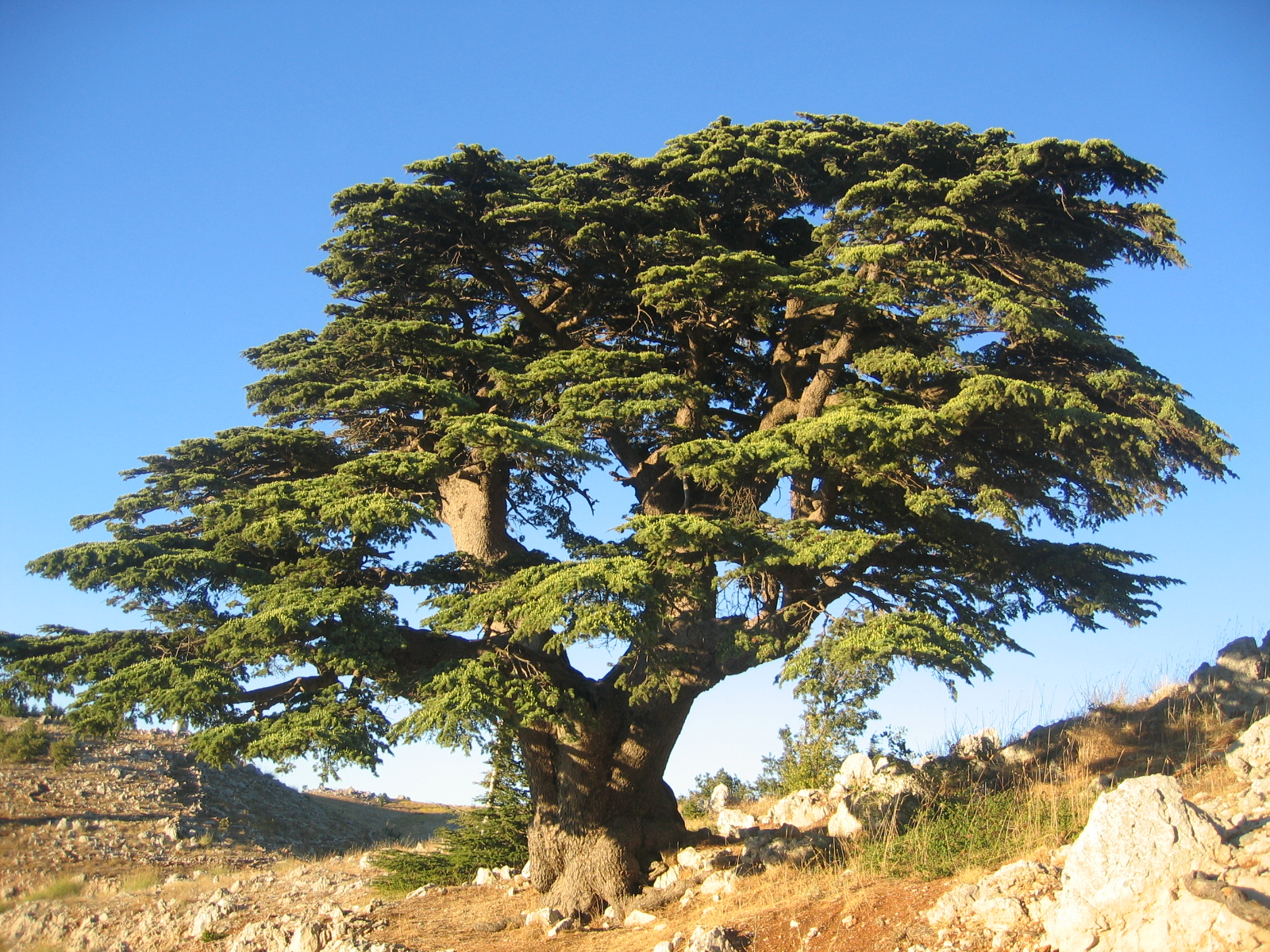
A cedar of Lebanon (Cedrus libani, which are associated with the "garden of the gods"

The name of the mountain is Mashu. As he arrives at the mountain of Mashu, Which every day keeps watch over the rising and setting of the sun, Whose peaks reach as high as the "banks of heaven," and whose breast reaches down to the netherworld, The scorpion-people keep watch at its gate.

The archaeologist Frans de Liagre Böhl has highlighted that the word Mashu in Sumerian means "twins". Jensen and Zimmern thought it to be the geographic location between Mount Lebanon and Mount Hermon in the Anti-Lebanon Mountains. Edward Lipiński and P. Kyle McCarter Jr. have suggested that the garden of the gods relates to a mountain sanctuary in the Lebanon and Anti-Lebanon ranges. Other scholars have found a connection between the Cedar Forest (Cedrus libani) and the garden of the gods. The garden is close to the forest: "Saria (Sirion/Mount Hermon) and Lebanon tremble at the felling of the cedars."

=== Eridu ===
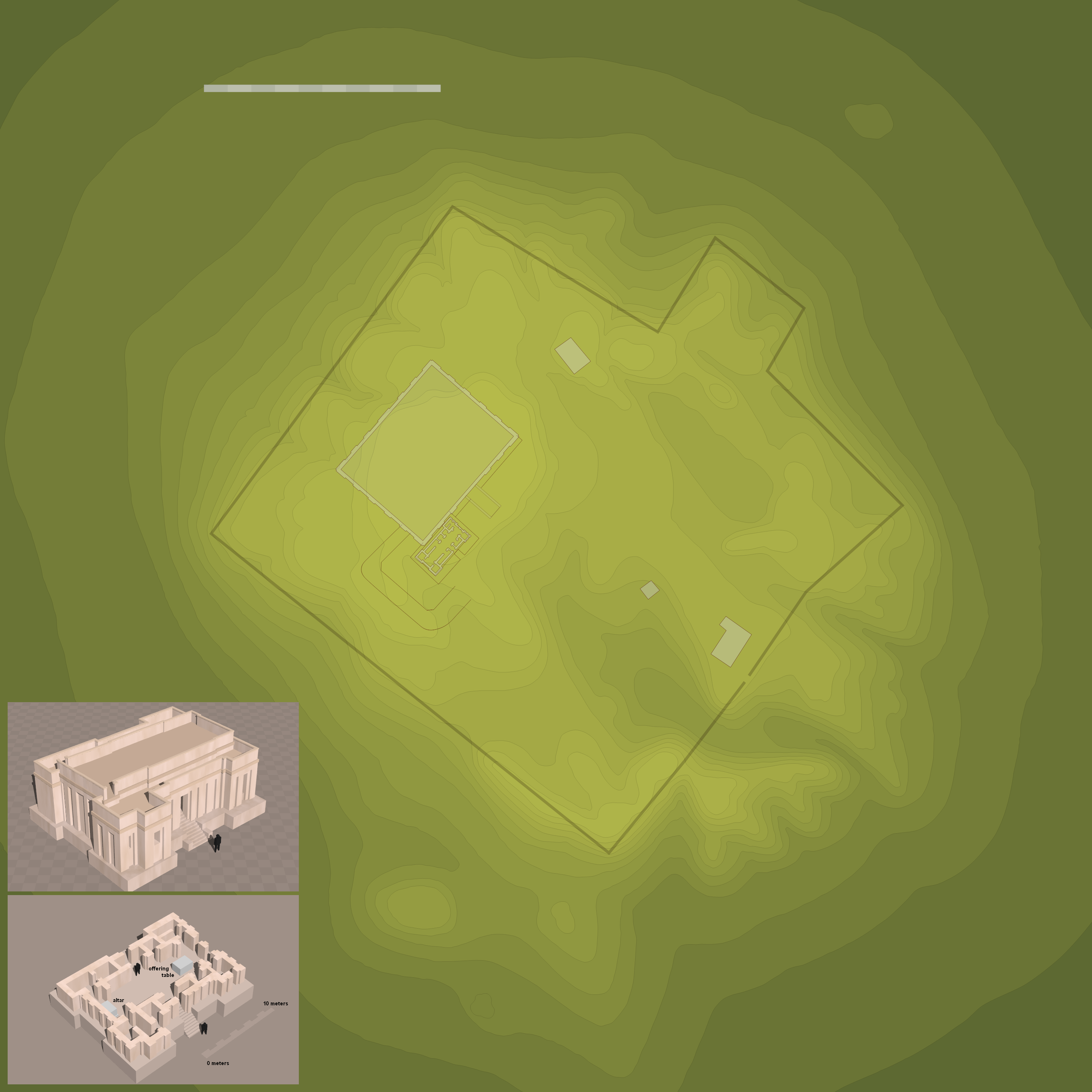
Tell mound at Eridu with temple dedicated to the gods

Theophilus Pinches suggested in 1908 that Eridu was the Sumerian paradise calling it "not the earthly city of that name, but a city conceived as lying also "within the Abyss", containing a tree of life fed by the Euphrates river. Pinches noted "it was represented as a place to which access was forbidden, for 'no man entered its midst', as in the case of the garden of Eden after the fall." In a myth called the Incantation of Eridu, it is described as having a "glorious fountain of the abyss", a "house of wisdom", sacred grove and a kiskanu-tree with the appearance of lapis-lazuli. Fuʼād Safar also found the remains of a canal running through Eridu in archaeological excavations of 1948 to 1949. William Foxwell Albright noted that "Eridu is employed as a name of the Abzu, just as Kutu (Kutha), the city of Nergal, is a common name of Aralu" highlighting the problems in translation where several places were called the same name. Alfred Jeremias suggested that Aralu was the same as Ariel in the West Bank and signified both the mountain of the gods and a place of desolation. As with the word Ekur, this has suggested that ideas associated with the netherworld came from a mountainous country outside of Babylonia.

=== Nippur ===
The myth of Enlil and Ninlil opens with a description of the city of Nippur, its walls, river, canals, and well, portrayed as the home of the gods and, according to Kramer, "that seems to be conceived as having existed before the creation of man." Andrew R. George suggests "Nippur was a city inhabited by gods not men, and this would suggest that it had existed from the very beginning." He discusses Nippur as the "first city" (uru-sag, "City-top" or "head") of Sumer. This conception of Nippur is echoed by Joan Goodnick Westenholz, describing the setting as "civitas dei", existing before the "axis mundi".

There was a city, there was a city—the one we live in. Nibru (Nippur) was the city, the one we live in. Dur-jicnimbar was the city, the one we live in. Id-sala is its holy river, Kar-jectina is its quay. Kar-asar is its quay where boats make fast. Pu-lal is its freshwater well. Id-nunbir-tum is its branching canal, and if one measures from there, its cultivated land is 50 sar each way. Enlil was one of its young men, and Ninlil was one its young women.

George also noted that a ritual garden was recreated in the "Grand Garden of Nippur, most probably a sacred garden in the E-kur (or Dur-an-ki) temple complex, is described in a cult-song of Enlil as a "garden of heavenly joy". Temples in Mesopotamia were also known to have adorned their ziggurats with a sanctuary and sacred grove of trees, reminiscent of the Hanging Gardens of Babylon.

== Mythology ==
=== Kesh temple hymn ===
In the Kesh temple hymn, the first recorded description (c. 2600 BC) of a domain of the gods is described as being the color of a garden: "The four corners of heaven became green for Enlil like a garden." In an earlier translation of this myth by George Aaron Barton in Miscellaneous Babylonian Inscriptions he considered it to read "In hursag the garden of the gods was green."

=== Debate between sheep and grain ===
Another Sumerian creation myth, the Debate between sheep and grain opens with a location "the hill of heaven and earth", and describes various agricultural developments in a pastoral setting. This is discussed by Edward Chiera as "not a poetical name for the earth, but the dwelling place of the gods, situated at the point where the heavens rest upon the earth. It is there that mankind had their first habitat and there the Babylonian Garden of Eden is to be placed." The Sumerian word Edin, means "steppe" or "plain", so modern scholarship has abandoned the use of the phrase "Babylonian Garden of Eden" as it has become clear the "Garden of Eden" was a later concept.

=== Epic of Gilgamesh ===
The Epic of Gilgamesh describes Gilgamesh travelling to a wondrous garden of the gods that is the source of a river, next to a mountain covered in cedars, and references a "plant of life". In the myth, paradise is identified as the place where the deified Sumerian hero of the flood, Utnapishtim (Ziusudra), was taken by the gods to live forever. Once in the garden of the gods, Gilgamesh finds all sorts of precious stones, similar to Genesis 2:12:

There was a garden of the gods: all round him stood bushes bearing gems ... fruit of carnelian with the vine hanging from it, beautiful to look at; lapis lazuli leaves hung thick with fruit, sweet to see ... rare stones, agate and pearls from out the sea.

=== Enki and Ninhursag ===
The myth of Enki and Ninhursag also describes the Sumerian paradise as a garden, which Enki obtains water from Utu to irrigate.

=== Song of the hoe ===
The song of the hoe features Enlil creating mankind with a hoe and the Anunnaki spreading outward from the original garden of the gods. It also mentions the Abzu being built in Eridu.

=== Hymn to Enlil ===
A Hymn to Enlil praises the leader of the Sumerian pantheon in the following terms:

You founded it in the Dur-an-ki, in the middle of the four quarters of the earth. Its soil is the life of the Land, and the life of all the foreign countries. Its brickwork is red gold, its foundation is lapis lazuli. You made it glisten on high.

== Later usage ==
The word for Paradise garden in much later Persian literature is pairi-Daeza, meaning "garden", "walled enclosure" or "orchard". The Arabic word for paradise or garden in the Qur'an is Jannah which literally means "concealed place". Two watercourses are supposed to flow underneath the jannah where large trees are described, mountains made of musk, between which rivers flow in valleys of pearl and ruby. Features of this garden of paradise are told in a parable in the Quran 47:15–15. Islamic gardens can further divide the watercourses into four, meeting at a spring and including a sanctuary for shade and rest.

In myths of the Greater Iranian culture and tradition, Jamshid is described as saving the world by building a magical garden on top of a mountain. This garden also features a tree of life and is the source of a river that brings fertility to the land. Jamshid is warned by Ahura Mazda about a freezing winter approaching and so creates this enclosure to protect the seeds of life when a climatic catastrophe strikes.
