= Hymn to Enlil =

Sacred Texts

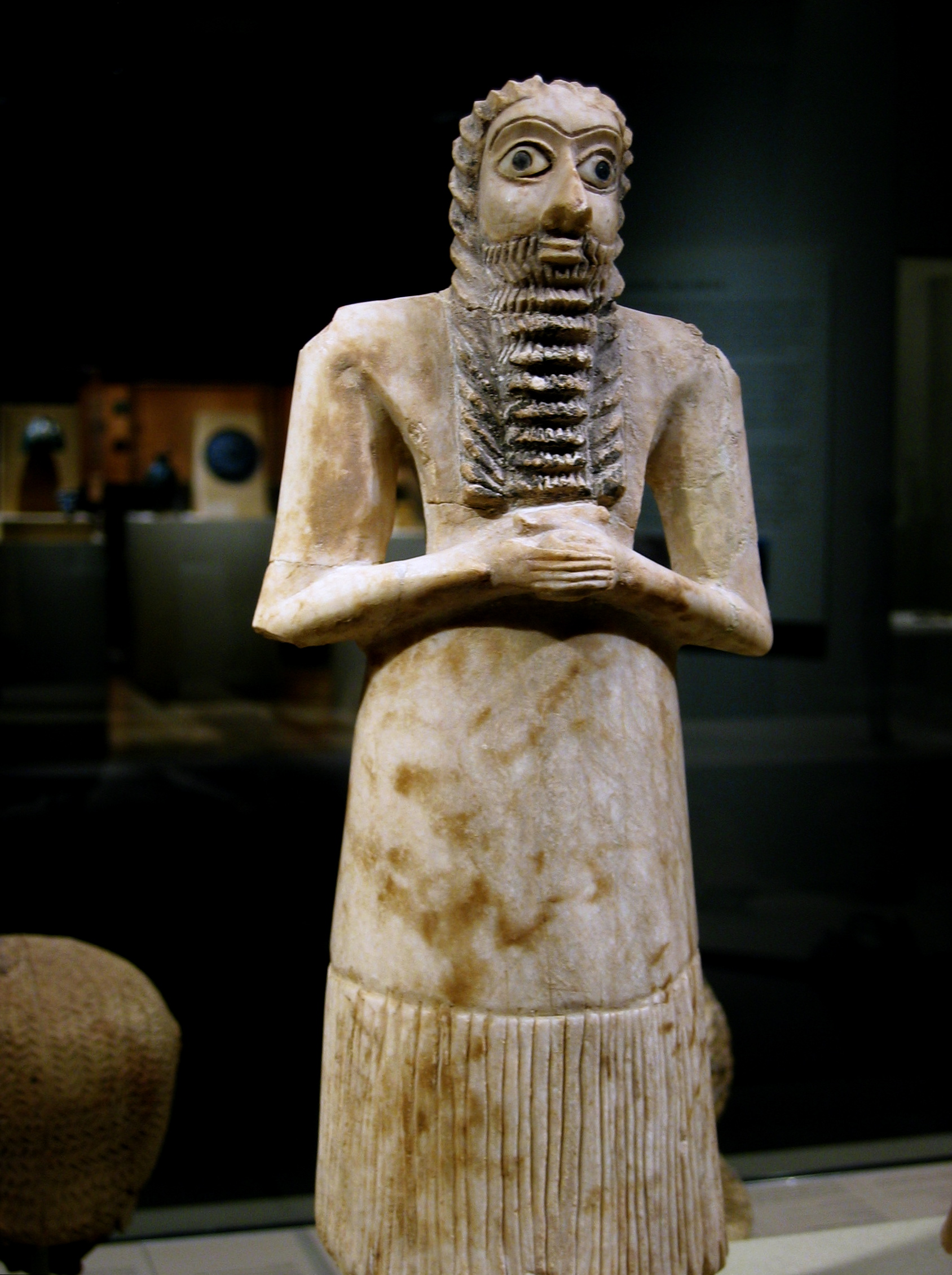
Figure of standing male worshiper, 2750-2600 B.C. (when Enlil was considered the most powerful god) from the "square temple" at Eshnunna

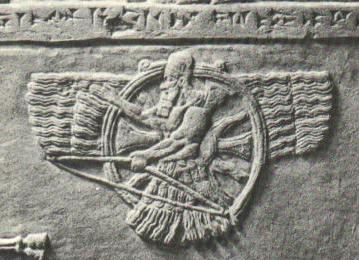
Feather robed and turbaned archer figure of Ashur (a later development of Enlil) superimposed on a sun disc

The Hymn to Enlil, Enlil and the Ekur (Enlil A), Hymn to the Ekur, Hymn and incantation to Enlil, Hymn to Enlil the all beneficent or Excerpt from an exorcism is a Sumerian myth, written on clay tablets in the late third millennium BC.

== Compilation ==
Fragments of the text were discovered in the University of Pennsylvania Museum of Archaeology and Anthropology catalogue of the Babylonian section (CBS) from their excavations at the temple library at Nippur. The myth was first published using tablet CBS 8317, translated by George Aaron Barton in 1918 as "Sumerian religious texts" in "Miscellaneous Babylonian Inscriptions", number ten, entitled "An excerpt from an exorcism". The tablet is 3.4 by 2.75 by 1.2 inches (8.6 by 7.0 by 3.0 cm) at its thickest point. A larger fragment of the text was found on CBS tablet number 14152 and first published by Henry Frederick Lutz as "A hymn and incantation to Enlil" in "Selected Sumerian and Babylonian Texts", number 114 in 1919. Barton's tablet had only contained lines five to twenty four of the reverse of Lutz's, which had already been translated in 1918 and was used to complete several of his damaged lines.

Edward Chiera published tablet CBS 7924B from the hymn in "Sumerian Epics and Myths". He also worked with Samuel Noah Kramer to publish three other tablets CBS 8473, 10226, 13869 in "Sumerian texts of varied contents" in 1934. The name given this time was "Hymn to the Ekur", suggesting the tablets were "parts of a composition which extols the ekur of Enlil at Nippur, it may, however be only an extract from a longer text". Further tablets were found to be part of the myth in the Hilprecht collection at the University of Jena, Germany, numbers 1530, 1531, 1532, 1749b, 2610, 2648a and b, 2665, 2685, 1576 and 1577. Further tablets containing the text were excavated at Isin, modern Ishan al-Bahriyat, tablet 923. Another was found amongst the texts in the Iraq Museum, tablet 44351a. Others are held in the collections of the Abbey of Montserrat in Barcelona and the Ashmolean in Oxford.

Other translations were made from tablets in the Nippur collection of the Museum of the Ancient Orient in Istanbul (Ni). Samuel Noah Kramer amongst others worked to translate several others from the Istanbul collection including Ni 1039, 1180, 4005, 4044, 4150, 4339, 4377, 4584, 9563 and 9698. More were found at Henri de Genouillac's excavations at Kish (C 53). Another tablet of the myth (Si 231) was excavated at Sippar in the collections of the Istanbul Archaeological Museum. Sir Charles Leonard Woolley unearthed more tablets at Ur contained in the "Ur excavations texts" from 1928. Other tablets and versions were used to bring the myth to its present form with the latest translations presented by Thorkild Jacobsen, Miguel Civil and Joachim Krecher.

== Composition ==
The hymn, noted by Kramer as one of the most important of its type, starts with praise for Enlil in his awe-inspiring dais:

Enlil's commands are by far the loftiest, his words are holy, his utterances are immutable! The fate he decides is everlasting, his glance makes the mountains anxious, his ... reaches into the interior of the mountains. All the gods of the earth bow down to father Enlil, who sits comfortably on the holy dais, the lofty engur, to Nunamnir, whose lordship and princeship are most perfect. The Anunnaki enter before him and obey his instructions faithfully.

The hymn develops by relating Enlil founding and creating the origin of the city of Nippur and his organization of the earth. In contrast to the myth of Enlil and Ninlil where the city exists before creation, here Enlil is shown to be responsible for its planning and construction, suggesting he surveyed and drew the plans before its creation:

When you mapped out the holy settlement on the earth, You built the city Nippur by yourself, Enlil. The Kiur, your pure place. In the Duranki, in the middle of the four quarters of the earth, you founded it. Its soil is the life of the land (Sumer)

The hymn moves on from the physical construction of the city and gives a description and veneration of its ethics and moral code:

The powerful lord, who is exceedingly great in heaven and earth, who knows judgement, who is wise. He of great wisdom takes his seat in the Duranki. In princeship he makes the Kiur, the great place, come forth radiantly. In Nippur, the 'bond' of heaven and earth, he establishes his place of residence. The City - its panorama is a terrifying radiance. To him who speaks mightily it does not grant life. It permits no inimical word to be spoken in judgement, no improper speech, hostile words, hostility, and unseemingliness, no evil, oppression, looking askance, acting without regard, slandering, arrogance, the breaking of promises. These abominations the city does not permit. The evil and wicked man do not escape its hand. The city, which is bestowed with steadfastness. For which righteousness and justice have been made a lasting possession.

The last sentence has been compared by R. P. Gordon to the description of Jerusalem in the Book of Isaiah (Isaiah 1:21), "the city of justice, righteousness dwelled in her" and in the Book of Jeremiah (Jeremiah 31:23), "O habitation of justice, and mountain of holiness." The myth continues with the city's inhabitants building a temple dedicated to Enlil, referred to as the Ekur. The priestly positions and responsibilities of the Ekur are listed along with an appeal for Enlil's blessings on the city, where he is regarded as the source of all prosperity:

Without the Great Mountain, Enlil, no city would be built, no settlement would be founded; no cow-pen would be built, no sheepfold would be established; no king would be elevated, no lord would be given birth; no high priest or priestess would perform extispicy; soldiers would have no generals or captains; no carp-filled waters would ... the rivers at their peak; the carp would not ... come straight up from the sea, they would not dart about. The sea would not produce all its heavy treasure, no freshwater fish would lay eggs in the reedbeds, no bird of the sky would build nests in the spacious land; in the sky the thick clouds would not open their mouths; on the fields, dappled grain would not fill the arable lands, vegetation would not grow lushly on the plain; in the gardens, the spreading forests of the mountain would not yield fruits. Without the Great Mountain, Enlil, Nintud would not kill, she would not strike dead; no cow would drop its calf in the cattle-pen, no ewe would bring forth ... lamb in its sheepfold; the living creatures which multiply by themselves would not lie down in their ... ; the four-legged animals would not propagate, they would not mate.

A similar passage to the last lines above has been noted in the Biblical Psalms (Psalms 29:9) "The voice of the Lord makes hinds to calve and makes goats to give birth (too) quickly". The hymn concludes with further reference to Enlil as a farmer and praise for his wife, Ninlil:

When it relates to the earth, it brings prosperity: the earth will produce prosperity. Your word means flax, your word means grain. Your word means the early flooding, the life of the lands. It makes the living creatures, the animals (?) which copulate and breathe joyfully in the greenery. You, Enlil, the good shepherd, know their ways ... the sparkling stars. You married Ninlil, the holy consort, whose words are of the heart, her of noble countenance in a holy ma garment, her of beautiful shape and limbs, the trustworthy lady of your choice. Covered with allure, the lady who knows what is fitting for the E-kur, whose words of advice are perfect, whose words bring comfort like fine oil for the heart, who shares the holy throne, the pure throne with you, she takes counsel and discusses matters with you. You decide the fates together at the place facing the sunrise. Ninlil, the lady of heaven and earth, the lady of all the lands, is honoured in the praise of the Great Mountain.

Andrew R. George suggested that the hymn to Enlil "can be incorporated into longer compositions" as with the Kesh temple hymn and "the hymn to temples in Ur that introduces a Shulgi hymn."

== Discussion ==
The poetic form and laudatory content of the hymn have shown similarities to the Book of Psalms in the Bible, particularly Psalm 23 (Psalms 23:1–2) "The Lord is my shepherd, I shall not want, he maketh me to lie down in green pastures." Line eighty four mentions:

Enlil, if you look upon the shepherd favourably, if you elevate the one truly called in the Land, then the foreign countries are in his hands, the foreign countries are at his feet! Even the most distant foreign countries submit to him.

and in line ninety one, Enlil is referred to as a shepherd:

Enlil, faithful shepherd of the teeming multitudes, herdsman, leader of all living creatures.

The shepherd motif originating in this myth is also found describing Jesus in the Book of John (John 10:11–13). Joan Westenholz noted that "The farmer image was even more popular than the shepherd in the earliest personal names, as might be expected in an agrarian society." She notes that both Falkenstein and Thorkild Jacobsen consider the farmer refers to the king of Nippur; Reisman has suggested that the farmer or 'engar' of the Ekur was likely to be Ninurta. The term appears in line sixty

Its great farmer is the good shepherd of the Land, who was born vigorous on a propitious day. The farmer, suited for the broad fields, comes with rich offerings; he does not ...... into the shining E-kur.

Wayne Horowitz discusses the use of the word abzu, normally used as a name for an abzu temple, god, cosmic place or cultic water basin. In the hymn to Enlil, its interior is described as a 'distant sea':

Its (Ekur's) me's (ordinances) are mes of the Abzu which no-one can understand. Its interior is a distant sea which 'Heaven's Edge' cannot comprehend.

The foundations of Enlil's temple are made of lapis lazuli, which has been linked to the "soham" stone used in the Book of Ezekiel (Ezekiel 28:13) describing the materials used in the building of "Eden, the Garden of god" perched on "the mountain of the lord", Zion, and in the Book of Job (Job 28:6–16) "The stones of it are the place of sapphires and it hath dust of gold". Moses also saw God's feet standing on a "paved work of a sapphire stone" in (Exodus 24:10). Precious stones are also later repeated in a similar context describing decoration of the walls of New Jerusalem in the Apocalypse (Revelation 21:21).

You founded it in the Dur-an-ki, in the middle of the four quarters of the earth. Its soil is the life of the Land, and the life of all the foreign countries. Its brickwork is red gold, its foundation is lapis lazuli. You made it glisten on high.

Along with the Kesh Temple Hymn, Steve Tinney has identified the Hymn to Enlil as part of a standard sequence of scribal training scripts he refers to as the Decad. He suggested that "the Decad constituted a required program of literary learning, used almost without exception throughout Babylonia. The Decad thus included almost all literary types available in Sumerian."

== See also ==
- Barton Cylinder
- Debate between Winter and Summer
- Debate between sheep and grain
- Enlil and Ninlil
- Eridu Genesis
- Old Babylonian oracle
- Kesh temple hymn
- Self-praise of Shulgi (Shulgi D)
- Lament for Ur
- Sumerian religion
- Sumerian literature
