= Kesh temple hymn =

Oldest surviving literary text in the world

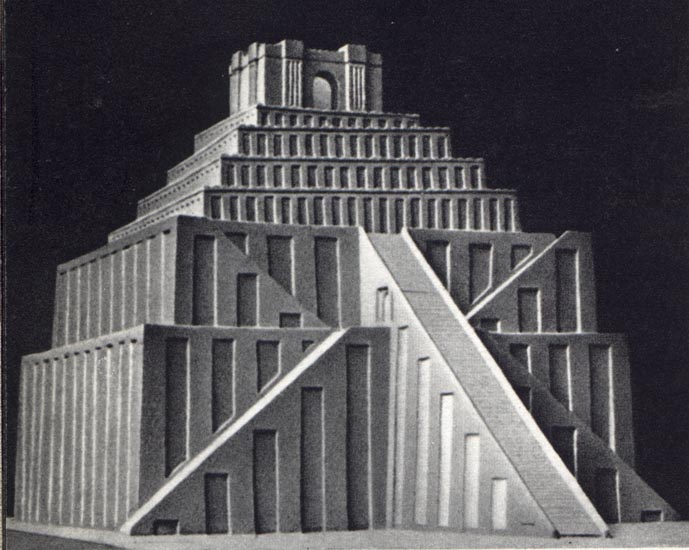
Sumerian Temple

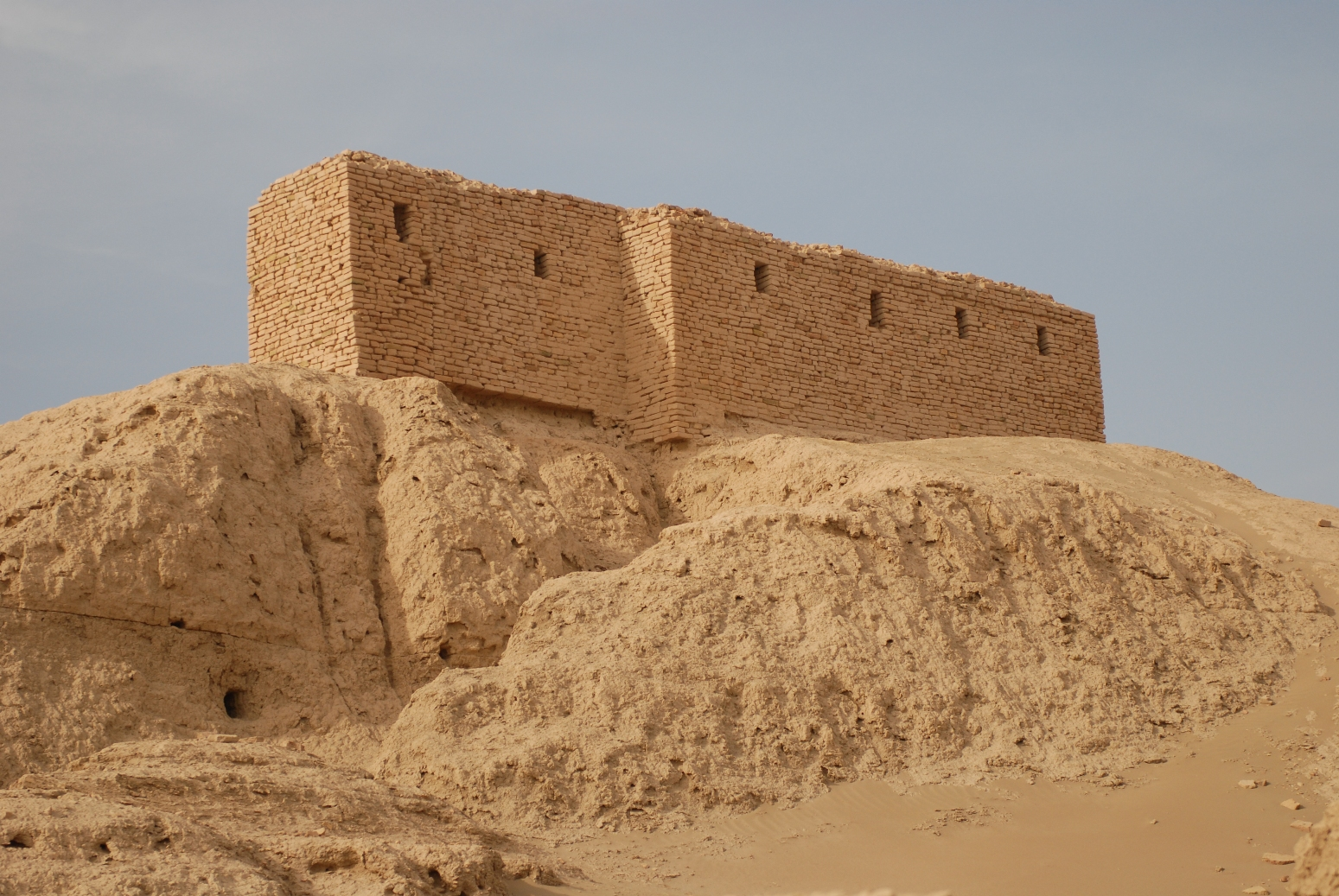
Ruins of a temple at Nippur

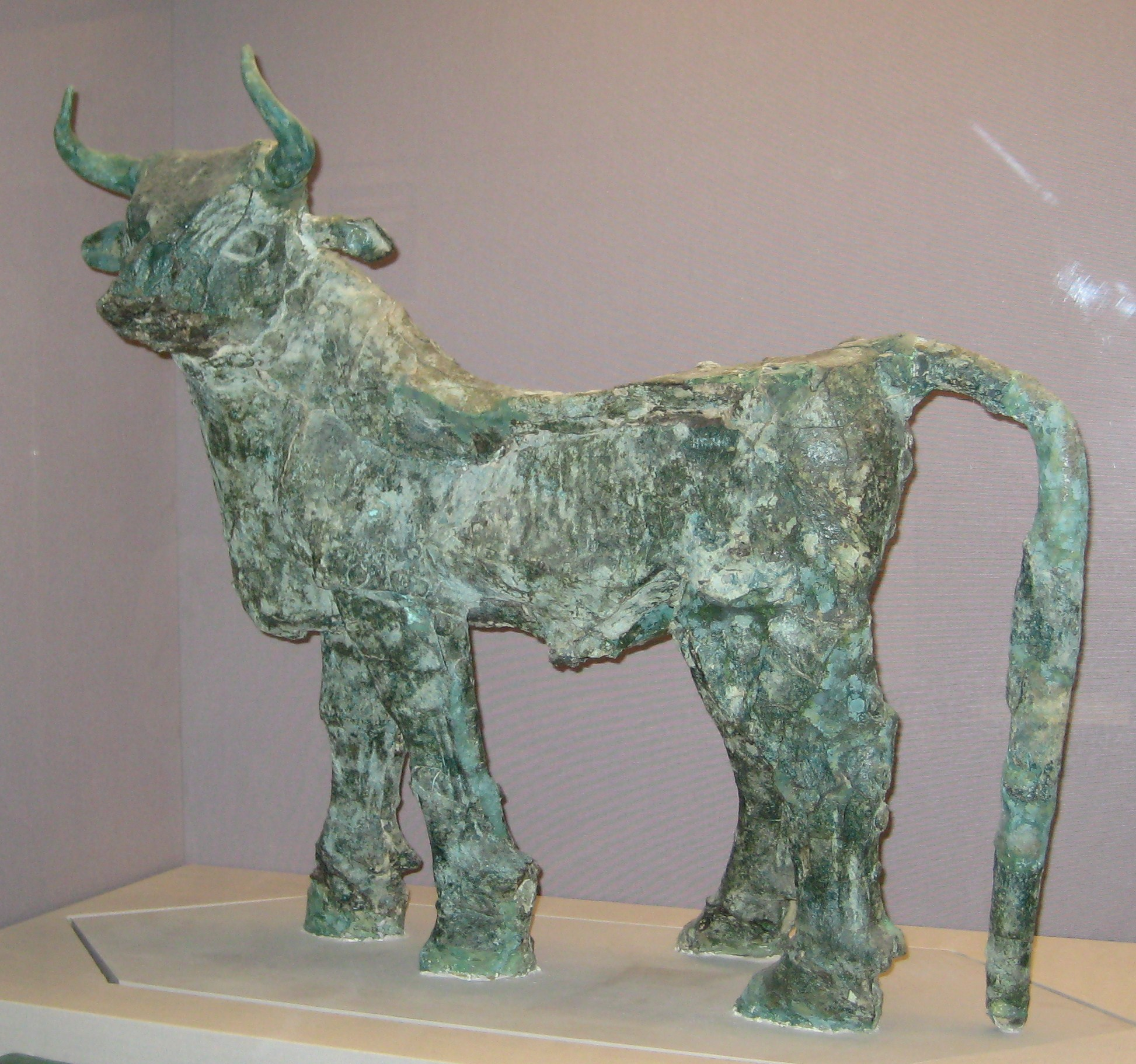
Copper figure of a bull from the Temple of Ninhursag, Tell al-'Ubaid, southern Iraq, around 2600 BCE.

The Kesh temple hymn, Liturgy to Nintud, or Liturgy to Nintud on the creation of man and woman, is a Sumerian tablet, written on clay tablets as early as 2600 BCE. Along with the Instructions of Shuruppak, it is the oldest surviving literature in the world.

== Compilation ==
Fragments of the text were discovered in the University of Pennsylvania Museum of Archaeology and Anthropology catalogue of the Babylonian section (CBS - Catalogue of the Babylonian Section) from their excavations at the temple library at Nippur in modern-day Iraq. One fragment of the text found on CBS tablet number 11876 was first published by Hugo Radau in "Miscellaneous Sumerian Texts," number 8 in 1909. Radau's fragment was translated by Stephen Herbert Langdon in 1915. Langdon published a translation from a 4 by 4 by 4 by 4 inches (10 by 10 by 10 by 10 cm) perforated, four sided, Sumerian prism from Nippur and held in the Ashmolean in Oxford in 1913 (number 1911-405) in "Babylonian Liturgies." The prism contains around 145 lines in eight sections, similar to the Hymn to Enlil. Langdon called it "A Liturgy to Nintud, Goddess of Creation" and noted that each section ended with the same refrain, which he interpreted as referring "to the creation of man and woman, the Biblical Adam and Eve." Langdon translated two further fragments in 1914 and 1917.

The myth was developed with the addition of CBS 8384, translated by George Aaron Barton in 1918 and first published as "Sumerian religious texts" in "Miscellaneous Babylonian Inscriptions," number eleven, entitled "A Fragment of the so-called 'Liturgy to Nintud.'" The tablet is 5.25 by 2.4 by 1.2 inches (13.3 by 6.1 by 3.0 cm) at its thickest point. Barton's tablet contained nine sections from which he was able to translate sections four, five and six. Barton argued for the abandonment of the myth's subtitle, the "creation of man." He claimed, "So far as the writer can see, there is no allusion in the text to the creation of man." He noted only the allusion to the goddess he called Nintu as "the mother of mankind." He suggested, "Apparently the text celebrated the primitive (or very early) conditions of some town; possibly the founding and growth of the town, but beyond this we can confidently affirm nothing."

CBS tablet 6520 was published in 1929 by Edward Chiera in "Sumerian Lexical Texts". Chiera also published three more tablets—CBS 7802, CBS 13625 and CBS 14153—in "Sumerian Epics and Myths". Other translations were made from tablets in the Nippur collection of the Museum of the Ancient Orient in Istanbul (Ni). Chiera translated number Ni 2402 in "Sumerian Religious Texts" in 1924. Hermann Volrath Hilprecht and Samuel Noah Kramer amongst others worked to translate several others from the Istanbul collection including Ni 4371, 4465, 4555 & 9773, 4597, 9649, 9810, 9861 & 9903. A further tablet source of the myth is held by the Louvre in Paris, number AO 6717. Others are held in the Ashmolean number 1929-478, British Museum number 115798 and the Walters Art Museum number 48.1802, formerly called the "David prism". Further tablets containing the text were excavated at Isin, modern Ishan al-Bahriyat. More were found at Henri de Genouillac's excavations at Kish (B 150) and Jean Perrot's excavations at Susa. Sir Charles Leonard Woolley unearthed more tablets at Ur contained in the "Ur excavations texts" from 1928. Other tablets and versions were used to bring the myth to its present form with the latest composite text by Miguel Civil produced in 1992 with latest translation by Gene Gragg in 1969 and Joachim Krecher in 1966. Gragg described the text as "one of the best preserved literary texts that we possess from the Old Babylonian period".

Robert D. Biggs translated an exceptionally archaic version of the hymn from Tell Abu Salabikh. He dated this version to around 2600 BCE based upon similarities to tablets found in Shuruppak and dated to a similar age by Anton Deimel in the 1920s. Subsequent radiocarbon dating of samples taken from Tell Abu Salabikh date the site to 2550–2520 BCE however, a timeframe slightly more recent than the one Biggs proposed. Biggs recognized various differences in the archaic cuneiform and that "the literary texts of this period were unrecognized for so long is due to the fact that they present formidable obstacles to comprehension". He suggests that Abu Salabikh could have been the location of Kesh, however points out that it is not near Adab as described and that Kesh could have just been a variation in the spelling of Kish. He discusses how the hymn is preserved for so long in later Nippur texts, saying "Although the Abu Saläbikh copies are approximately eight centuries earlier than copies known before, there is a surprisingly small amount of deviation (except in orthography) between them. The Old Babylonian version is thus not a creation of Old Babylonian scribes using older material, but is a faithful reflection of a text that had already been fixed in the Sumerian literary tradition for centuries." Biggs suggested "that other traditional works of literature may also go back in essentially their present form to the last third of the third millennium BCE at least."

== Composition ==
Victor Hurowitz referred to it as the "Kesh Temple building hymn" and suggests the hymn begins with a description and Enlil praising the city Kesh and its selection and establishment of the Ekur by Enlil. He also discusses the writing of the hymn by another god called Nisaba. Sabrina P. Ramet commented on the presence and role of Nisaba (or Nidaba) in the establishment of the temple. She refers to her as the "goddess of vegetation, writing and literature including astronomical texts, the deity of the "house of understanding" (most likely intelligence), and as she who 'knows the (inmost) secrets of numbers'." Nisaba records the events and provides a "standard version" of the events as they really happened. Charpin and Todd noted in the relationship between Enlil and Nisuba (similar to Yahweh and Moses) how the text is the work of gods, who created and transmitted it to humans, giving the literature a reason for legitimacy.

The princely one, the princely one came forth from the house. Enlil, the princely one, came forth from the house. The princely one came forth royally from the house. Enlil lifted his glance over all the lands, and the lands raised themselves to Enlil. The four corners of heaven became green for Enlil like a garden. Kesh was positioned there for him with head uplifted, and as Kesh lifted its head among all the lands, Enlil spoke the praises of Kesh. Nisaba was its decision-maker; with its words she wove it intricately like a net. Written on tablets it was held in her hands: House, platform of the Land, important fierce bull!

The myth goes on to describe the temple dedication rites and explains that the Annanuki were the lords of the temple. He suggests that the hymn mentions "objects placed in the temple upon its completion." His translation of the introduction reads:

Temple [...] Kesh Temple growing up like a mountain embracing the heaven. Growing up like Ekur when it lifted its head in the Land.

The hymn is composed of 134 lines, formally divided into eight songs or "houses" or "temples", each of which ends with three rhetorical questions discussing the birth of Nintud's warrior son, Acgi:

Will anyone else bring forth something as great as Kesh? Will any other mother ever give birth to someone as great as its hero Acgi? Who has ever seen anyone as great as its lady Nintud?.

Lines 1–21 describe the election and praise of Kesh as recorded by Nisaba, 22–44 liken the temple to the moon against the sky containing the life sources of Sumer and its cosmic dimensions filling the world. Lines 45–57 give a metaphorical description of the temple reaching both for the heaven and descending into the underworld. Lines 58–73 discuss the complexities of the temple with vast quantities of oxen and sheep. The temple is likened to the trees from which wood was used in its construction. The gods and functions of the temple are described and praised during temple dedication with different parts of the temple described: its interior and exterior appearance, its gate, courtyard, door and walls. The hymn ends on the conclusion to approach the temple.

Wayne Horowitz working from Gragg's translation, discusses the mention of the Abzu in the myth saying it "occurs as a name for the cosmic waters of the water table beneath the earth's surface in Sumerian literature."

Temple, great crown reaching heaven. Temple, rainbow reaching heaven. Temple, whose gleam stretches into 'Heaven's Midst', whose foundation is fastened on the Abzu.

The latest translation describes its founders, geography and features:

House founded by An, praised by Enlil, given an oracle by mother Nintud! [...] house, at its upper end a mountain, at its lower end a spring! House, at its upper end threefold indeed [...] Whose well-founded storehouse is established as a household [...] whose terrace is supported by lahama deities; whose princely great wall [...] the shrine of Urim!

Barton translated the actions of the Annanuki in and around the temple:

In it their heroes were collected; they were noble. In decisions rendered, the word of all the gods, they rejoiced; The fields, – the sheep and oxen were like an ox of the stall; the cedars spoke; they were like messengers; The field invited the oxen all of them; The field strengthened the sheep all of them; Their fig-trees on the bank of the boat filled; The weapon the lord, the prince [...] lifted up; The luluppi-tree of the wife of the god, the pi-pi-plants of [...] In hursag the garden of the god were green.

Jeremy Black suggests the hymn describes the statues of bulls or lions that were placed at the entrances to temples "Kesh temple, <before which> (something) in the shape of winged lions stands, (something) in the shape of 'white' wild bulls stands facing the desert." The hymn discusses music being played at the temple towards the end with drums and the coarse sound of a bull's horn sounding at temple ceremonies: "the wild bull's horn was made to growl, the algarsura instrument was made to thud." Samuel Noah Kramer suggested that the musical instruments mentioned in the hymn were played in accompaniment. He proposed that the tigi was probably a hymn accompanied by lyre, that irshemma was perhaps one accompanied by a type of drum and that adab possibly a hymn accompanied by another form of string instrument.

The hymn finishes with an admonition repeated four times suggested to be both a warning and invocation of the divine presence in the temple. Such ambivalence about approaching temples has crucially influenced the development of Jewish and Christian mysticism.

Draw near, man, to the city, to the city -- but do not draw near! Draw near, man, to the house Kesh, to the city -- but do not draw near! Draw near, man, to its hero Acgi -- but do not draw near! Draw near, man, to its lady Nintud -- but do not draw near! Praise be to well-built Kesh, O Acgi! Praise be to cherished Kesh and Nintud!

A.R. George suggests such hymns "can be incorporated into longer compositions, as with the eulogy to Nippur and Ekur which makes up a large portion of a well-known Hymn to Enlil and the hymn to temples in Ur that introduces a Shulgi hymn."

The Enheduanna hymn/poem version is:

"Towering Kesh. You are the image of heaven and earth. Like the mighty viper of the desert, you spread fear. House of Ninhursanga, you stand on a land of wrath. Glorious Kesh: your heart is deep, your form is huge. Great lion . . . the upland, roaming through the wild. Great mountain, brought here by holy incantations. Your heart is dusk, moon light cannot enter you. The Lady of Birth has given you beauty. House of Kesh: your brickwork is your birthing. Your terrace is a crown of lapis lazuli: your frame is your creation. Your lady is the lady who imposes silence. The great good queen of heaven.When she speaks, heaven shakes. When she opens her mouth, storms roar. Ninhursanga, Enlil’s sister, has built a home in your holy court, House of Kesh, and has taken her seat upon your throne. Thirteen lines. House of Ninhursanga in Kesh."

== Discussion ==
Stephen Langdon suggested the hymn gave evidence of the Sumerian theological view that Enlil and Ninlil created mankind and living things. He noted that Nintud, the primary goddess of Kesh was "a form of Ninlil in Nippur : in other words she is Ninlil of Kesh, where her character as goddess of begetting was emphasized." He noted based on an observation of Theophilus G. Pinches, that Ninlil or Belit Ilani had seven different names (such as Nintud, Ninhursag, Ninmah, etc.) for seven different localities. He also discussed the location of Kesh appearing to be near Kish to the east of Babylon calling the temple of Kesh "Ekisigga". Raymond de Hoop noted similarities between Sumerian temple hymns and chapter forty nine of Genesis in the Bible (Genesis 49:1–28). He suggests remarkably close syntactical and metaphorical parallels in the sayings about Joseph and Judah such as "the highly esteemed prince (Genesis 49:8), "a leopard, who seizes prey" (Genesis 49:9), "a great wild ox / a wild bull" (Genesis 49:22) and " seed of a (the) steer, engendered by a wild ox (Genesis 49:22). Jeremy Black noted that Kesh was no longer a major settlement by the time of the later Babylonian versions but presumed that the temple of Nintud still functioned. Wilfred G. Lambert noted that many kings had built temples and chapels to Ninhursag, but that the Kesh sanctuary "was the centre of the goddess's cult from the Early Dynastic period into the Old Babylonian Dynasty; after this time it lost its importance".

== See also ==
- Barton Cylinder
- Debate between Winter and Summer
- Debate between sheep and grain
- Enlil and Ninlil
- Eridu Genesis
- Old Babylonian oracle
- Self-praise of Shulgi (Shulgi D)
- Hymn to Enlil
- Lament for Ur
- Sumerian religion
- Sumerian literature
