= Lament for Ur =

Sumerian lament

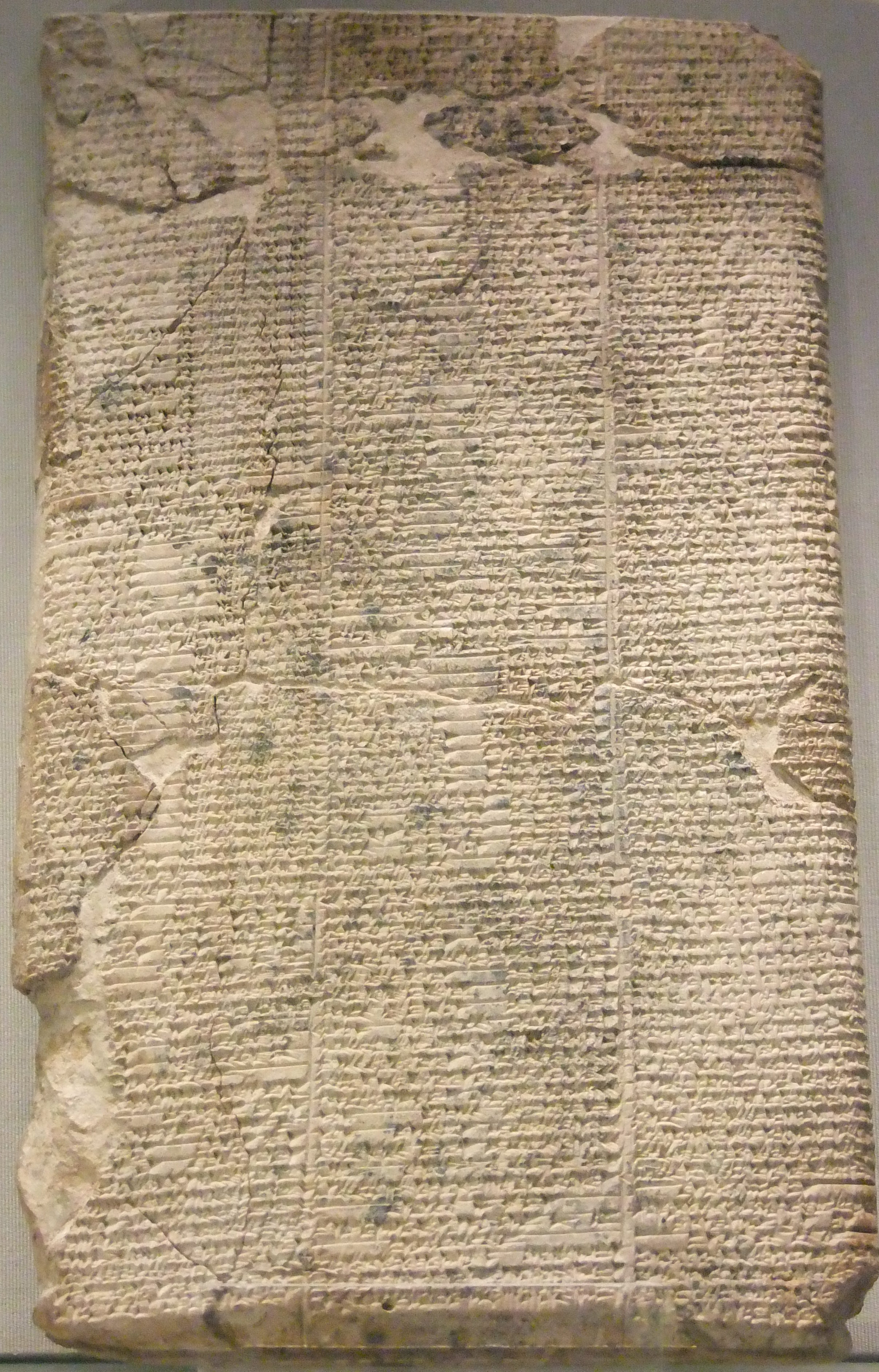
- Lament for Ur at the Louvre Museum
- Height: 22.9 cm
- Width: 11.4 cm
- Created: c. 2000 BC
- Present location: Paris, Ile-de-France, France

The Lament for Ur, or Lamentation over the city of Ur is a Sumerian lament composed around the time of the fall of Ur to the Elamites and the end of the city's third dynasty (c. 2000 BC).

== Laments ==
It contains one of five known Mesopotamian "city laments"—dirges for ruined cities in the voice of the city's tutelary goddess.

The other city laments are:

- The Lament for Sumer and Ur
- The Lament for Nippur
- The Lament for Eridu
- The Lament for Uruk

The Book of Lamentations of the Old Testament, which bewails the destruction of Jerusalem by Nebuchadnezzar II of Babylon in the sixth century BC, is similar in style and theme to these earlier Mesopotamian laments. Similar laments can be found in the Book of Jeremiah, the Book of Ezekiel and the Book of Psalms, Psalm 137 (Psalms 137:1–9).

== Compilation ==
The first lines of the lament were discovered on the University of Pennsylvania Museum of Archaeology and Anthropology catalogue of the Babylonian section, tablet numbers 2204, 2270, 2302 and 19751 from their excavations at the temple library at Nippur in modern-day Iraq. These were translated by George Barton in 1918 and first published as "Sumerian religious texts" in Miscellaneous Babylonian Inscriptions, number six, entitled "A prayer for the city of Ur". The restored tablet is 9 by 4.5 by 1.75 inches (22.9 by 11.4 by 4.4 cm) at its thickest point. Barton noted that "from the portions that can be translated it appears to be a prayer for the city of Ur at a time of great danger and distress. It seems impossible to assign it with certainty to any particular period." He noted that it was plausible but unconfirmed to conjecture that it "was written in the last days of Ibbi-Sin when Ur was tottering to its fall".

Edward Chiera published other tablets CBS 3878, 6889, 6905, 7975, 8079, 10227, 13911 and 14110 in "Sumerian texts of varied contents" in 1934, which combined with tablets CBS 3901, 3927, 8023, 9316, 11078 and 14234 to further restore the myth, calling it a "Lamentation over the city of Ur". A further tablet source of the myth is held by the Louvre in Paris, number AO 6446. Others are held in the Ashmolean, Oxford, numbers 1932,415, 1932,522, 1932,526j and 1932,526o. Further tablets were found to be part of the myth in the Hilprecht collection at the University of Jena, Germany, numbers 1426, 1427, 1452, 1575, 1579, 1487, 1510 and 1553. More fragments are held at the Musée d'Art et d'Histoire (Geneva) in Switzerland, MAH 15861 and MAH 16015.

Other translations were made from tablets in the Nippur collection of the Museum of the Ancient Orient in Istanbul (Ni). Samuel Noah Kramer amongst others worked to translate several others from the Istanbul collection including Ni 4496, 1162, 2401, 2510, 2518, 2780, 2911, 3166, 4024, 4424, 4429, 4459, 4474, 4566, 9586, 9599, 9623, 9822 and 9969. Other tablets from the Istanbul collection, numbers Ni 2510 and 2518 were translated by Edward Chiera in 1924 in "Sumerian religious texts". Sir Charles Woolley unearthed more tablets at Ur contained in the "Ur excavations texts" from 1928. Other tablets are held in the Vorderasiatisches Museum Berlin and the Yale Babylonian collection. Samuel Kramer compiled twenty-two different fragments into the first complete edition of the Lament, which was published in 1940 by the University of Chicago as Lamentation over the Destruction of Ur (Assyriological Study no. 12). Other tablets and versions were used to bring the myth to its present form with a composite text by Miguel Civil produced in 1989 and latest translations by Thorkild Jacobsen in 1987 and Joachim Krecher in 1996. In 2012, 3 new fragments from Nippur (Ni. 4296, Ni. 4383, and Ni. 4566) were published.

== Composition ==
The lament is composed of four hundred and thirty eight lines in eleven kirugu (sections), arranged in stanzas of six lines. It describes the goddess Ningal, who weeps for her city after pleading with the god Enlil to call back a destructive storm. Interspersed with the goddess's wailing are other sections, possibly of different origin and composition; these describe the ghost town that Ur has become, recount the wrath of Enlil's storm, and invoke the protection of the god Nanna (Nergal or Suen) against future calamities. Ningal, the wife of the moon god Nanna, goes on to recall her petition to the leaders of the gods, An and Enlil to change their minds and not to destroy Ur. She does this both in private and in a speech to the Annunaki assembly:

I verily clasped legs, laid hold of arms, truly I shed my tears before An, truly I made supplication, I myself before Enlil: "May my city not be ravaged, I said to them, May Ur not be ravaged.

The council of gods decide that the Ur III dynasty, which had reigned for around one hundred years, had its destiny apportioned to end. The temple treasury was raided by invading Elamites and the centre of power in Sumer moved to Isin, while control of trade in Ur passed to several leading families of the city. Kenneth Wade suggested that Terah, the father of Abraham in the Book of Genesis could have been one of the heads of such a leading family (Genesis 11:28). The metaphor of a garden hut being knocked down is used for the destroyed temple of Ur and in subsequent lines this metaphorical language is extended to the rest of the setting, reminiscent of the representation of Jerusalem as a "booth" in the Book of Amos (Amos 9:11). Ningal bewails:

My faithful house ... like a tent, a pulled-up harvest shed, like a pulled-up harvest shed! Ur, my home filled with things, my well-filled house and city that were pulled up, were verily pulled up.

The different temples throughout the land are described with their patron gods or goddesses abandoning the temples, like sheepfolds:

Ninlil has abandoned that house, the Ki-ur, and has let the breezes haunt her sheepfold. The queen of Kesh has abandoned it and has let the breezes haunt her sheepfold. Ninmah has abandoned that house Kesh and has let the breezes haunt her sheepfold.

Edward L. Greenstein has noted the emptying of sheep pens as a metaphor of the destruction of the city. He also notes that the speakers of the laments are generally male lamentation-priests, who take on the characteristics of a traditional female singer and ask for the gods to be appeased so the temples can be restored. Then a goddess, sometimes accompanied by a god notes the devastation and weeps bitterly with a dirge about the destructive storm and an entreats to the gods to return to the sanctuaries. The destruction of the Elamites is compared in the myth to imagery of a rising flood and raging storm. This imagery is facilitated by the title of Enlil as the "god of the winds" The following text suggests that the setting of the myth was subject to a destructive storm prior to its final destruction:

Alas, storm after storm swept the Land together: the great storm of heaven, the ever-roaring storm, the malicious storm which swept over the Land, the storm which destroyed cities, the storm which destroyed houses, the storm which destroyed cow-pens, the storm which burned sheepfolds, which laid hands on the holy rites, which defiled the weighty counsel, the storm which cut off all that is good from the Land.

Various buildings are noted to be destroyed in Enlil's storm, including the shrines of Agrun-kug and Egal-mah, the Ekur (the sanctuary of Enlil), the Iri-kug, the Eridug and the Unug. The destruction of the E-kiš-nu-ĝal is described in detail.

The good house of the lofty untouchable mountain, E-kiš-nu-ĝal, was entirely devoured by large axes. The people of Šimaški and Elam, the destroyers, counted its worth as only thirty shekels. They broke up the good house with pickaxes. They reduced the city to ruin mounds.

Images of what was lost, and the scorched earth that was left behind indicate the scale of the catastrophe. The Line 274 reads

"eden kiri-zal bi du-du-a-mu gir-gin ha-ba-hu-hur" - My steppe, established for joy, was scorched like an oven.

The destruction of the location is reported to Enlil, and his consort Ninlil, who are praised and exalted at the end of the myth.

== Discussion ==
The Lament for Ur has been well known to scholarship and well edited for a long time. Piotr Michalowski has suggested this gave literary primacy to the myth over the Lament for Sumer and Ur, originally called the "Second Lament for Ur", which he argues was chronologically a more archaic version. Philip S. Alexander compares lines seventeen and eighteen of the myth with Lamentations 2:17 "The Lord has done what he purposed, he has carried out his threat; as he ordained long ago, he has demolished without pity", suggesting this could "allude to some mysterious, ineluctable fate ordained for Zion in the distant past":

The wild bull of Eridug has abandoned it and has let the breezes haunt his sheepfold. Enki has abandoned that house Eridug and has let the breezes haunt his sheepfold.

The devastation of cities and settlements by natural disasters and invaders has been used widely throughout the history of literature since the end of the Third Dynasty of Ur. A stela (pictured) from Iraq depicts a similar destruction of a mountain house at Susa.

Dead men, not potsherds. Covered the approaches. The walls were gaping, the high gates, the roads, were piled with dead. In the side streets, where feasting crows would gather, scattered they lay. In all the side streets and roadways bodies lay. In the open fields that used to fill with dancers, they lay in heaps. The country's blood now filled its holes, like metal in a mould; Bodies dissolved - like fat left in the sun.

Michelle Breyer suggested tribes of neighbouring shepherds destroyed the city and called Ur, "the last great city to fall".

== Gallery ==
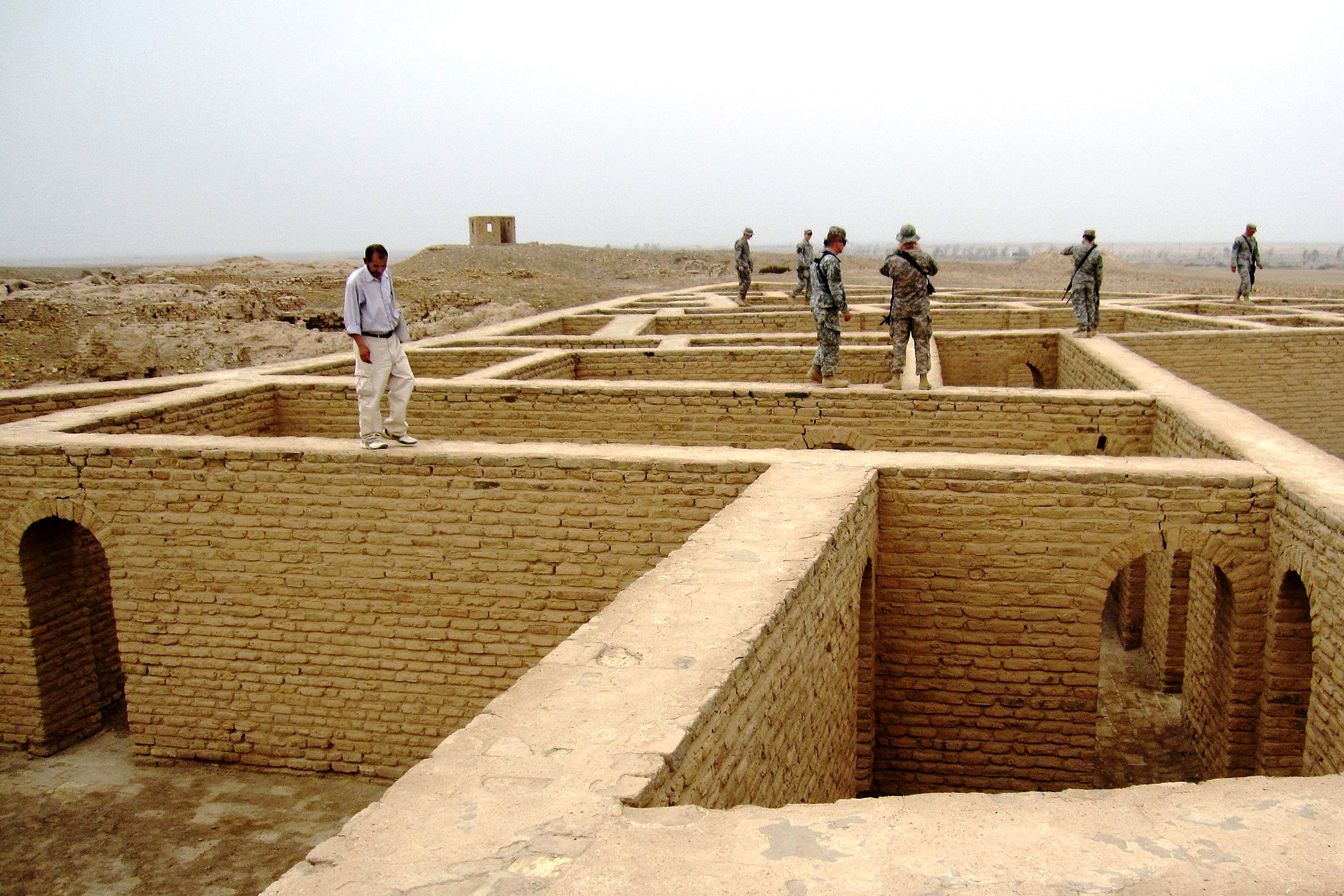
Reconstructed ruins of the city of Ur

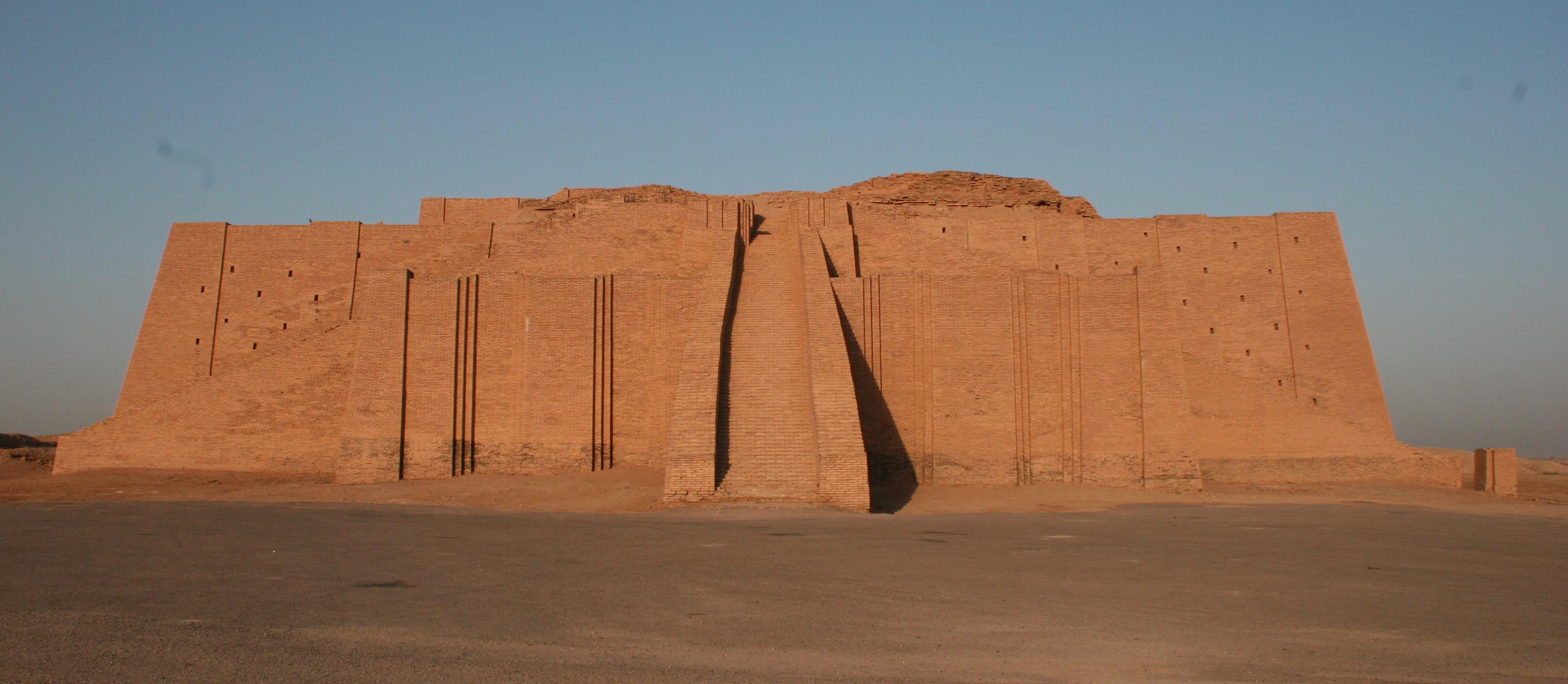
Ziggurat of Ur

== See also ==
- Barton Cylinder
- Debate between Winter and Summer
- Debate between sheep and grain
- Enlil and Ninlil
- Eridu Genesis
- Old Babylonian oracle
- Self-praise of Shulgi (Shulgi D)
- Kesh temple hymn
- Hymn to Enlil
- Sumerian religion
- Sumerian literature
- Panbabylonism
- Third Dynasty of Ur
- Sumer
- Nuclear weapon
- Nuclear warfare
