= Miscellaneous Babylonian Inscriptions =

Book by George Aaron Barton

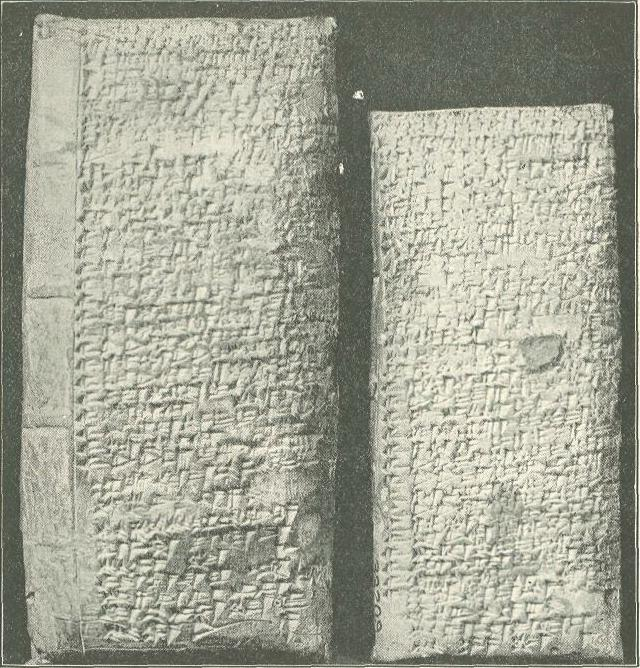
- Semitic Babylonian contract-tablet inscribed in the reign of Hammurabi
- Author: George Aaron Barton
- Language: English
- Subject: Language, Sumerology, Cuneiform studies, Translation
- Publisher: Yale University Press, Oxford University Press
- Publication date: August 1918
- Publication place: United States
- Media type: print (hardback)
- Pages: 177pp (first edition)
- ISBN: 978-1-148-59897-0
- OCLC: 2539495
- Dewey Decimal: 492/.1
- LC Class: PJ3711 .Y34 1983

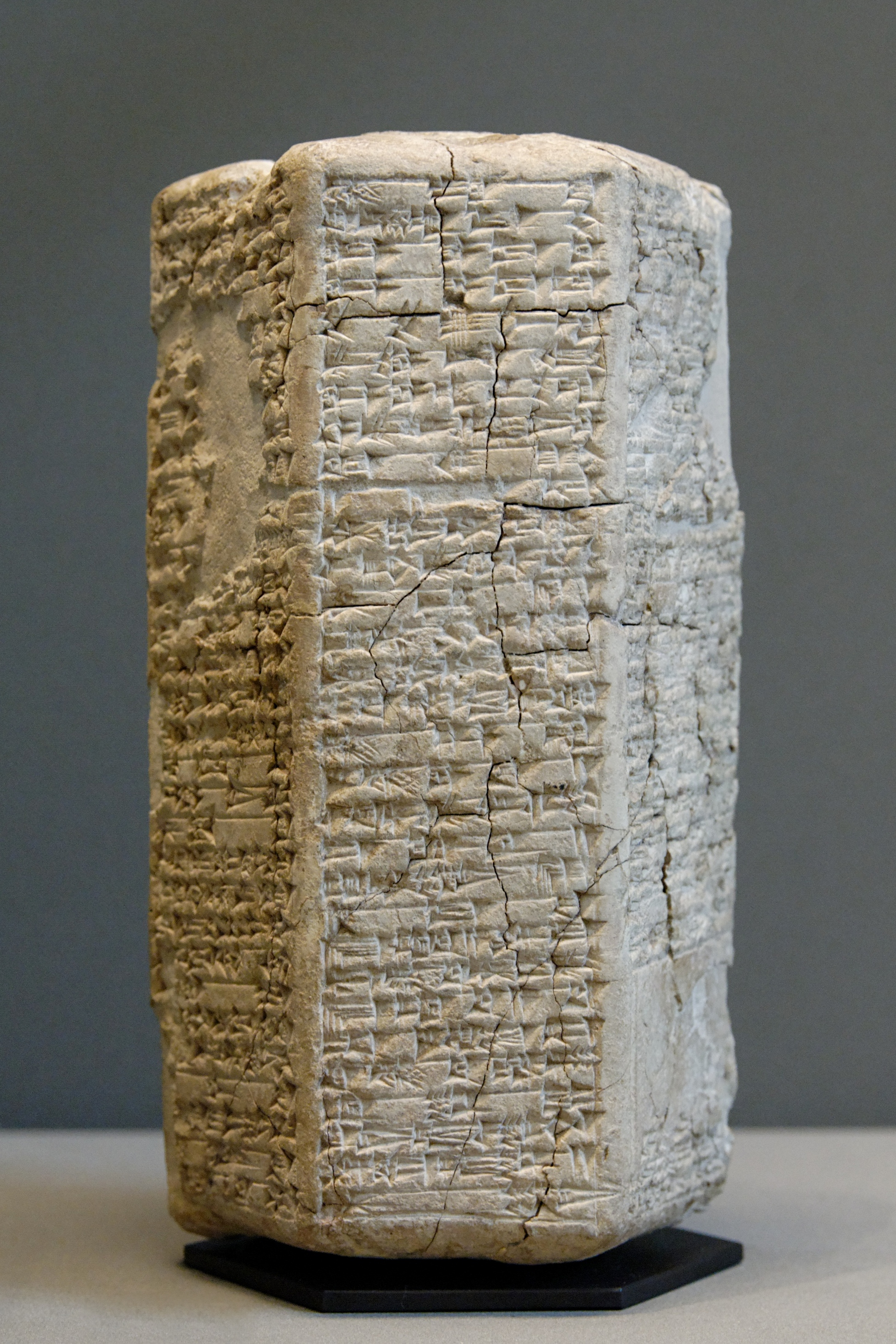
Sumerian Cuneiform Cylinder similar to the "Barton Cylinder"

Miscellaneous Babylonian Inscriptions is a 1918, Sumerian linguistics and mythology book written by George Aaron Barton.

It was first published by Yale University Press in the United States and deals with commentary and translations of twelve cuneiform, Sumerian myths and texts discovered by the University of Pennsylvania Museum of Archaeology and Anthropology excavations at the temple library at Nippur. Many of the texts are extremely archaic, especially the Barton Cylinder, which Samuel Noah Kramer suggested may date as early as 2500 BC. A more modern dating by Joan Goodnick Westenholz has suggested the cylinder dates to around 2400 BC.

== Contents ==
Some of the myths contained in the book are shown below:

Modern title	Museum number	Barton's title
Debate between sheep and grain	14,005	A Creation Myth
Barton Cylinder	8,383	The oldest religious text from Babylonia
Enlil and Ninlil	9,205	Enlil and Ninlil
Self-praise of Shulgi (Shulgi D)	11,065	A hymn to Dungi
Old Babylonian oracle	8,322	An Old Babylonian oracle
Kesh temple hymn	8,384	Fragment of the so-called "Liturgy to Nintud"
Debate between Winter and Summer	8,310	Hymn to Ibbi-Sin
Hymn to Enlil	8,317	An excerpt from an exorcism
Lament for Ur	19,751, 2,204, 2,270 & 2,302	A prayer for the city of Ur
