= Old Babylonian oracle =

Sumerian myths

The Old Babylonian oracle is a Sumerian myth, written on clay tablets dated to between 2340 and 2200 BC.

The myth was discovered on the University of Pennsylvania Museum of Archaeology and Anthropology, catalogue of the Babylonian section (CBS), tablet number 8322 from their excavations at the temple library at Nippur. This was translated by George Aaron Barton in 1918 and first published as "Sumerian religious texts" in Miscellaneous Babylonian Inscriptions, number two, entitled "An Old Babylonian Oracle". The tablet is 3.2 inches (8.1 cm) by 2.6 inches (6.6 cm) by 0.85 inches (2.2 cm) at its thickest point.

Barton suggests the text is difficult and enigmatic, he confesses the interpretation put forward is uncertain and with great reserve. He suggests that it describes an oracle given by a seer for a priest called "Allu-Kal" who wished to rebuild dwellings or a temple of cedar wood. Barton suggests Enlil then appears and takes Enki's axe, presumably to chop cedars for the building he proceeds to guard. Allu-Kal then entreats the gods for protection of the dwellings of cedar to which the gods exalt him in reply and he is called a "bearded prince," suggested as a hint that he may be deified as were Naram-Sin, Gudea and Shulgi.

with cedar he shall build. Strong are the houses; the dwelling is of aromatic wood, the great dwelling of Enlil.

== See also ==
- Barton Cylinder
- Debate between Winter and Summer
- Debate between sheep and grain
- Enlil and Ninlil
- Self-praise of Shulgi (Shulgi D)
- Hymn to Enlil
- Kesh temple hymn
- Lament for Ur
- Sumerian religion
- Sumerian literature
