= Winter and Summer =

Winter and Summer may refer to:

- An episode of Barney and Friends
- A Sumerian creation myth, the Debate between Winter and Summer
