= Barton Cylinder =

Clay cylinder inscribed with a Sumerian creation myth

The Barton Cylinder, also known as CBS 8383, is a clay cylinder dating to the mid to late 3rd millennium BCE on which is written a Sumerian creation myth. It is now in the University of Pennsylvania Museum of Archaeology and Anthropology. Joan Goodnick Westenholz suggests it dates to around 2400 BC (ED III).

== Description and date ==
The cylinder is inscribed with a Sumerian cuneiform mythological text, found at the site of Nippur in 1889 during excavations conducted by the University of Pennsylvania. The cylinder takes its name from George Barton, who was the first to publish a transcription and translation of the text in 1918 in "Miscellaneous Babylonian Inscriptions". It is also referred to as University of Pennsylvania Museum of Archaeology and Anthropology, Catalogue of the Babylonian Section (CBS) number 8383. Samuel Noah Kramer referred to it as The Nippur Cylinder and suggested it may date as far back as 2500 BC. The cylinder dates to the Old Babylonian period, but Falkenstein (1951) surmises that the composition was written in Archaic, pre-Ur III cuneiform, likely dating to the Akkadian Empire (c. 2300 BC). He concludes a non-written literary history that was characterised and repeated in future texts. Jan van Dijk concurs with this suggestion that it is a copy of a far older story predating neo-Sumerian times.

== Translation ==
The following translation is taken from Lisman 2013.

column 1

1 On that remote day, until that remote day,

2 it was indeed;

3 in that remote night, until that remote night,

4 it was indeed;

5 in that more year, until that remote year,

6 it was indeed.

7 Then a gale was really blowing unceasingly,

8 there were really flashes of lightning continuously.

9 Near the sanctuary of Nippur

10 a gale was really blowing unceasingly

11 there were really flashes of lightning continuously,

12 An/heaven is shouting together with Ki/earth;

13 [empty]

14 Ki/earth is shouting together with An/heaven

15 [...]

about 7 broken lines

column 2

1 With the true, great Queen of heaven,

2 the older sister of Enlil,

3 Ninhursag

4 with the true, great Queen of heaven,

5 the older sister of Enlil,

6 Ninhursag

7 he has had intercourse;

8 he had kissed her;

9 the seed for a set of setupletes [seven children]

10 he has poured into her womb.

11 Earth chatted cheery with the muš-ğir snake:

12 [empty]

13 'Exalted Divine River,

14 your small things have brought along water;

15 in the canals, the god of the river

16 [...] has [...]'

17 [...]

about 6 broken lines

== Content ==
The most recent edition was published by Bendt Alster and Aage Westenholz in 1994. Jeremy Black calls the work "a beautiful example of Early Dynastic calligraphy" and discussed the text "where primeval cosmic events are imagined." Along with Peeter Espak, he notes that Nippur is pre-existing before creation when heaven and earth separated. Nippur, he suggests is transfigured by the mythological events into both a "scene of a mythic drama" and a real place, indicating "the location becomes a metaphor."

Black details the beginning of the myth: "Those days were indeed faraway days. Those nights were indeed faraway nights. Those years were indeed faraway years. The storm roared, the lights flashed. In the sacred area of Nibru (Nippur), the storm roared, the lights flashed. Heaven talked with Earth, Earth talked with Heaven." The content of the text deals with Ninhursag, described by Bendt and Westenholz as the "older sister of Enlil." The first part of the myth deals with the description of the sanctuary of Nippur, detailing a sacred marriage between An and Ninhursag during which heaven and earth touch. Piotr Michalowski says that in the second part of the text "we learn that someone, perhaps Enki, made love to the mother goddess, Ninhursag, the sister of Enlil and planted the seed of seven (twins of) deities in her midst."

The Alster and Westenholz translation reads: "Enlil's older sister / with Ninhursag / he had intercourse / he kissed her / the semen of seven twins / he planted in her womb"

Peeter Espak clarifies the text gives no proof of Enki's involvement, however he notes "the motive described here seems to be similar enough to the intercourse conducted by Enki in the later myth "Enki and Ninhursag" for suggesting the same parties acting also in the Old-Sumerian myth."

== Significance ==
Barton suggested that the text portrayed a primitive sense of religion where "chief among these spirits were gods, who, however capricious, were the givers of vegetation and life." He discusses the text as a series of entreatments and appeals to the various provider and protector gods and goddesses, such as Enlil, in lines such as "O divine lord, protect the little habitation."

== Influence ==
Barton suggests that several concepts within the text were later recycled in the much later biblical Book of Genesis. He describes Ninhursag in terms of a snake goddess who creates enchantments, incantations, and oils, to protect from demons, saying: "Her counsels strengthen the wise divinity of An", a statement which reveals a point of view similar to that of Genesis 3, (Genesis 3:1) 'Now the serpent was more subtle than any beast of the field." Barton also finds reference to the tree of life in the text, from which he claimed: "As it stands the passage seems to imply a knowledge on the part of the Babylonians of a story kindred to that of Genesis (Genesis 2:9). However, in the absence of context one cannot build on this." Finding yet another parallel with Genesis, Barton mentions that "The Tigris and Euphrates are twice spoken of as holy rivers – and the 'mighty abyss' (or 'well of the mighty abyss') is appealed-to for protection."

His translation reads: "The holy Tigris, the holy Euphrates / the holy sceptre of Enlil / establish Kharsag."

== See also ==
- Debate between sheep and grain
- Debate between Winter and Summer
- Enlil and Ninlil
- Eridu Genesis
- Old Babylonian oracle
- Self-praise of Shulgi (Shulgi D)
- Kesh temple hymn
- Hymn to Enlil
- Lament for Ur
- Sumerian religion
- Sumerian literature

== Sources ==
- Lisman, J.W. (2013). Cosmogony, Theogony and Anthropogeny in Sumerian texts. Ugarit-Verlag.
