= Debate between Winter and Summer =

Sumerian creation myth

The Debate between Winter and Summer or Myth of Emesh and Enten is a Sumerian creation myth belonging to the genre of Sumerian disputations, written on clay tablets in the mid to late 3rd millennium BC.

== Disputations ==
Seven "debate" topics are known from the Sumerian literature, falling in the category of 'disputations'; some examples are: the debate between sheep and grain; the debate between bird and fish; the tree and the reed; and the dispute between silver and copper, etc. These topics came some centuries after writing was established in Sumerian Mesopotamia. The debates are philosophical and address humanity's place in the world.

== Compilation ==
The first lines of the myth were discovered on the University of Pennsylvania Museum of Archaeology and Anthropology, catalogue of the Babylonian section (CBS), tablet number 8310 from their excavations at the temple library at Nippur. This was translated by George Aaron Barton in 1918 and first published as "Sumerian religious texts" in Miscellaneous Babylonian Inscriptions, number seven, entitled "A Hymn to Ibbi-Sin". The tablet is 5.5 inches (14 cm) by 4.75 inches (12.1 cm) by 1.6 inches (4.1 cm) at its thickest point. Barton describes Ibbi-Sin as an "inglorious King" suggesting the text to have been composed during his lifetime, he commented "The hymn provides a powerful statement for emperor worship in Ur at the time of composition." Ibbi-Sin is still mentioned in the modern translation "For my king named by Nanna, the son of Enlil, Ibbi-Sin, when he is arrayed in the 'cutur' garment and the 'hursag' garment."

Another tablet from the same collection, number 8886 was documented by Edward Chiera in Sumerian Epics and Myths, number 46. Samuel Noah Kramer included CBS tablets 3167, 10431, 13857, 29.13.464, 29.16.142 (which forms a join with 8310), 29.16.232, 29.16.417, 29.16.427, 29.16.446 and 29.16.448. He also included translations from tablets in the Nippur collection of the Museum of the Ancient Orient in Istanbul, catalogue numbers 2705, 3167 and 4004. Further tablets from Nippur were added by Jane Heimerdinger. Other tablets were added from the "Ur excavations texts" in 1928 along with several others to bring it to its present form. A later edition of the text were published by Miguel Civil in 1996.

== Story ==
The story takes the form of a contest poem between two cultural entities first identified by Kramer as vegetation gods, Emesh and Enten. These were later identified with the natural phenomena of Summer and Winter, respectively. The location and occasion of the story is described in the introduction with the usual creation sequence of day and night, food and fertility, weather and seasons and sluice gates for irrigation.

An lifted his head in pride and brought forth a good day. He laid plans for ... and spread the population wide. Enlil set his foot upon the earth like a great bull. Enlil, the king of all lands, set his mind to increasing the good day of abundance, to making the ... night resplendent in celebration, to making flax grow, to making barley proliferate, to guaranteeing the spring floods at the quay, to making ... lengthen (?) their days in abundance, to making Summer close the sluices of heaven, and to making Winter guarantee plentiful water at the quay.

The two seasons are personified as brothers, born after Enlil copulates with a "hursag" (hill). The destinies of Summer and Winter are then described, Summer founding towns and villages with plentiful harvests, Winter to bring the Spring floods.

He copulated with the great hills, he gave the mountain its share. He filled its womb with Summer and Winter, the plenitude and life of the Land. As Enlil copulated with the earth, there was a roar like a bull's. The hill spent the day at that place and at night she opened her loins. She bore Summer and Winter as smoothly as fine oil. He fed them pure plants on the terraces of the hills like great bulls. He nourished them in the pastures of the hills. Enlil set about determining the destinies of Summer and Winter. For Summer founding towns and villages, bringing in harvests of plenitude for the Great Mountain Enlil, sending labourers out to the large arable tracts, and working the fields with oxen; for Winter plenitude, the spring floods, the abundance and life of the Land, placing grain in the fields and fruitful acres, and gathering in everything – Enlil determined these as the destinies of Summer and Winter.

The two brothers soon decide to take their gifts to Enlil's "house of life", the E-namtila, where they begin a debate about their relative merits. Summer argues:

Your straw bundles are for the oven-side, hearth and kiln. Like a herdsman or shepherd encumbered by sheep and lambs, helpless people run like sheep from oven-side to kiln, and from kiln to oven-side, in the face of you. In sunshine ... you reach decisions, but now in the city people's teeth chatter because of you.

To which Winter replies:

Father Enlil, you gave me control of irrigation; you brought plentiful water. I made one meadow adjacent to another and I heaped high the granaries. The grain became thick in the furrows ... Summer, a bragging field-administrator who does not know the extent of the field ... my thighs grown tired from toil. ... tribute has been produced for the king's palace. Winter admires the heart of your ... in words.

Enlil eventually intervenes and declares Winter the winner of the debate and there is a scene of reconciliation. Bendt Alster explains "Winter prevails over Summer, because Winter provides the water that was so essential to agriculture in the hot climate of ancient Mesopotamia."

Enlil answered Summer and Winter: "Winter is controller of the life-giving waters of all the lands – the farmer of the gods produces everything. Summer, my son, how can you compare yourself to your brother Winter?" The import of the exalted word Enlil speaks is artfully wrought, the verdict he pronounces is one which cannot be altered – who can change it? Summer bowed to Winter and offered him a prayer. In his house he prepared emmer-beer and wine. At its side they spend the day at a succulent banquet. Summer presents Winter with gold, silver and lapis lazuli. They pour out brotherhood and friendship like best oil. By bringing sweet words to the quarrel (?) they have achieved harmony with each other. In the dispute between Summer and Winter, Winter, the faithful farmer of Enlil, was superior to Summer – praise be to the Great Mountain, father Enlil!"

== Discussion ==
John Walton wrote that "people in the Ancient Near East did not think of creation in terms of making material things – instead, everything is function oriented. Creation thus constituted bringing order to the cosmos from an originally nonfunctional condition. Consequently, to create something (cause it to exist) in the ancient world means to give it a function, not material properties." Samuel Noah Kramer has noted this myth "is the closest extant Sumerian parallel to the Biblical Cain and Abel story" in the Book of Genesis (Genesis 4:1–16). This connection has been made by other scholars. The disputation form has also been suggested to have similar elements to the discussions between Job and his friends in the Book of Job. M. L. West noted similarities with Aesop's fable "a debate between Winter and Spring" along with another similar work by Bion of Smyrna.

J.J.A. van Dijk analysed the myth and determined the following common elements with other Sumerian debates "(1) Introduction, presenting the disputants and the occasion of the dispute; (2) the dispute itself, in which each party praises himself and attacks the other; (3) judgement uttered by a god, followed by reconciliation; (4) a formula of praise." Bendt Alster suggests a link to harvest festivals, saying "It is definitely conceivable that summer and winter contests may have belonged to festivals celebrating the harvest among the peasants." Herman Vanstiphout has suggested the lexical listing of offerings was used in scribal training, quoting the example from the myth "Wild Animals, cattle and sheep from the mountains, Wild rams, mountain rams, deer and full-grown ibex, Mountain sheep, first class sheep, and fat tailed sheep he brings."

Eliade and Adams note that in the story, the water flows through the "hursag" (foothills), Enlil is identified as a "kurgal" (mountain) and his main temple being the "Ekur" (mountain house), they link this mountain aspect with Enlil being the "Lord of the winds" by suggesting the ancients believed the winds originated in the mountains. Piotr Michalowski makes the connection in the story that "E-hursag" is a structure "named as the residence of the king" and "E-namtilla" "as the residence of Enlil", suspecting the two words refer to the same place and that "E-namtilla is simply another name for E-hursag" and that it was a royal palace.

== See also ==
- Barton Cylinder
- Debate between bird and fish
- Debate between sheep and grain
- Enlil and Ninlil
- Eridu Genesis
- Hymn to Enlil
- Kesh temple hymn
- Lament for Ur
- Old Babylonian oracle
- Self-praise of Shulgi (Shulgi D)
- Song of the hoe
- Sumerian literature
- Sumerian religion
