= Garden of the Gods (disambiguation) =

== Religion and Mythology ==
- Garden of the gods (Sumerian paradise), a concept in Ancient Mesopotamian religion
- Garden of the Gods in Norse mythology, the etymological root of Asgard

== Literature ==
- The Garden of the Gods, the third book in Gerald Durrell's Corfu Trilogy

== Places ==
- Garden of the Gods, in Colorado Springs, Colorado
- Garden of the Gods Wilderness in southern Illinois
