= Debate between sheep and grain =

Sumerian creation myth

The "Debate between sheep and grain" or "Myth of cattle and grain" (ETCSL 5.3.2) is a Sumerian disputation and creation myth, written on clay tablets in the mid to late 3rd millennium BC.

== Disputations ==
Seven "debate" topics are known from the Sumerian literature, falling in the category of 'disputations'; some examples are: the Debate between Winter and Summer; the Debate between bird and fish; the Tree and the Reed; and the Debate between silver and copper. These topics came some centuries after writing was established in Sumerian Mesopotamia. The debates are philosophical and address humanity's place in the world.

== Compilation ==
The first sixty-one lines of the myth were discovered on the University of Pennsylvania Museum of Archaeology and Anthropology catalogue of the Babylonian section, tablet number 14,005 from their excavations at the temple library at Nippur. This was translated by George Aaron Barton in 1918 and first published as "Sumerian religious texts" in "Miscellaneous Babylonian Inscriptions", number eight, entitled "A New Creation Myth". The tablet is 5 by 2.6 by 1.25 inches (12.7 by 6.6 by 3.2 cm) at its thickest point. Barton describes the text as an "elaborate statement of the non-existence of many things once upon a time" and considered it a "statement that mankind was brought into existence through the physical union of a god and a goddess."

Another tablet from the same collection, number 6893 (part of which was destroyed) was translated by Edward Chiera in 1924 increasing the text to seventy lines in "Sumerian religious texts". Chiera compiled his translation using further tablets translated by Hugo Radau published in "Miscellaneous Sumerian Texts" in 1909. Stephen Herbert Langdon also translated further parts of the text and discusses the myth saying, "One of the most remarkable tablets in the Museum is number 14005, a didactic poem in 61 lines on the period of pre-culture and institution of paradise by the earth god and the water god in Dilmun". It was then increased to two hundred lines and the myth called cattle and grain by Samuel Noah Kramer in 1959; he called it the "second myth significant for the Sumerian concept of the creation of man". He added the translation of a tablet by Hermann Hilprecht and included translations of museum tablet numbers 7344, 7916, 15161 and 29.15.973. He also included translations from tablets in the Nippur collection of the Museum of the Ancient Orient in Istanbul, catalogue numbers 2308, 4036 and 4094. Other translations were taken from Edward Chiera's "Sumerian Epics and Myths" numbers 38, 54, 55, 56 and 57. In total, seventeen pieces were found by Kramer to belong to the myth. Later work has added to this and modern translation has removed the deification of Lahar and Ashnan, naming them simply "grain" and "sheep" (also known as cattle).

== Story ==
The story opens with a location "the hill of heaven and earth" which is discussed by Chiera as "not a poetical name for the earth, but the dwelling place of the gods, situated at the point where the heavens rest upon the earth. It is there that mankind had their first habitat, and there the Babylonian Garden of Eden is to be placed." The Sumerian word Edin, means "steppe" or "plain", so modern scholarship has abandoned the use of the phrase "Babylonian Garden of Eden" as it has become clear that the "Garden of Eden" was a later concept. Jeremy Black suggests that this area was restricted for gods, noting that field plans from the Third Dynasty of Ur use the term hursag ("hill") to describe the hilly parts of fields that are hard to cultivate due to the presence of prehistoric tell mounds (ruined habitations).

Kramer discusses the story of the god An creating the cattle-goddess, Lahar, and the grain goddess, Ashnan, to feed and clothe the Anunnaki, who in turn made man. Lahar and Ashnan are created in the "duku" or "pure place" and the story further describes how the Anunnaki create a sheepfold with plants and herbs for Lahar and a house, plough and yoke for Ashnan, describing the introduction of animal husbandry and agriculture. The story continues with a quarrel between the two goddesses over their gifts which eventually resolves with Enki and Enlil intervening to declare Ashnan the victor.

== Discussion ==
Samuel Noah Kramer has noted the parallels and variations between the story and the later one of Cain and Abel in the Bible Book of Genesis (Genesis 4:1–16). Ewa Wasilewska mentions, "this text is not very clear, allowing for the interpretation that humankind was already present before Lahar and Ashnan were created and it was them, not the Anunnakû, who were not able to provide for themselves and for the deities until they were given divine 'breath' (Lyczkowska and Szarzynska 1981). However, it seems that Kramer's translation is more appropriate concerning the Sumerian realm in which each and every creation must have had its clearly described purpose". Karen Rhea Nemet-Nejat noted the use of measuring rods in the tale as being linked to the history of writing, which developed in order to keep count of animals and produce. Jeremy Black suggests that the victory of grain perhaps implies that man can live without domestic animals, but cannot survive without bread. He goes on to point out that the debates on both sides are roughly equal.

== Quotes ==
The introduction to the myth reads:

When, upon the hill of heaven and earth, An created the Annunaki, since he neither spawned nor created Grain with them, and since in the Land he neither fashioned the yarn of Uttu (the goddess of weaving) nor pegged out the loom for Uttu—with no Sheep appearing, there were no numerous lambs, and with no goats, there were no numerous kids, the sheep did not give birth to her twin lambs, and the goat did not give birth to her triplet kids; the Annunaki, the great gods, did not even know the names Grain or Sheep. There was no grain of thirty days; there was no grain of forty days; there was no grain of fifty days; there was no small grain, grain from the mountains or grain from the holy habitations. There was no cloth to wear; Uttu had not been born—no royal turban was worn; lord Niĝir-si, the precious lord, had not been born; The god of wild animals had not gone out into the barren lands. The people of those days did not know about eating bread. They did not know about wearing clothes; they went about with naked limbs in the Land. Like sheep they ate grass with their mouths and drank water from the ditches.

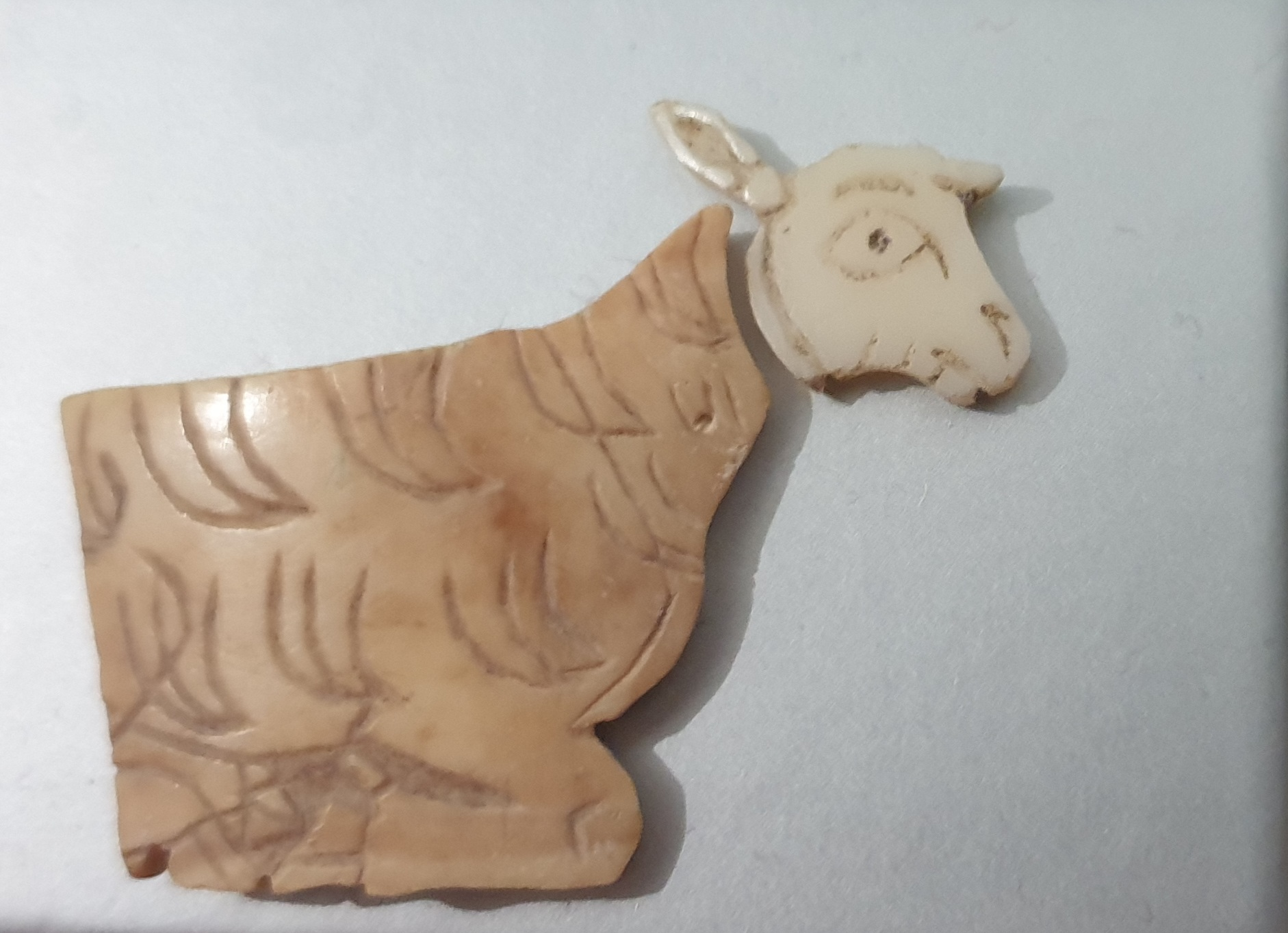
A Sumerian group of two separate shell inlay fragments forming the body and head of a sheep. c. 27th–24th century BC. From a Mayfair gallery, London, UK.

The benefits that grain and sheep bring to the habitation are also described:

They brought wealth to the assembly. They brought sustenance to the Land. They fulfilled the ordinances of the gods. They filled the store-rooms of the Land with stock. The barns of the Land were heavy with them. When they entered the homes of the poor who crouch in the dust they brought wealth. Both of them, wherever they directed their steps, added to the riches of the household with their weight. Where they stood, they were satisfying; where they settled, they were seemly. They gladdened the heart of An and the heart of Enlil.

The final merits of grain are emphasized in a proverb at the end of the myth:

From sunrise till sunset, may the name of Grain be praised. People should submit to the yoke of Grain. Whoever has silver, whoever has jewels, whoever has cattle, whoever has sheep shall take a seat at the gate of whoever has grain, and pass his time there.

== See also ==
- Barton Cylinder
- Debate between Winter and Summer
- Debate between bird and fish
- Enlil and Ninlil
- Eridu Genesis
- Old Babylonian oracle
- Self-praise of Shulgi (Shulgi D)
- Hymn to Enlil
- Kesh temple hymn
- Lament for Ur
- Sumerian religion
- Sumerian literature
