= Sumerian literature =

18th–17th century BCE writings

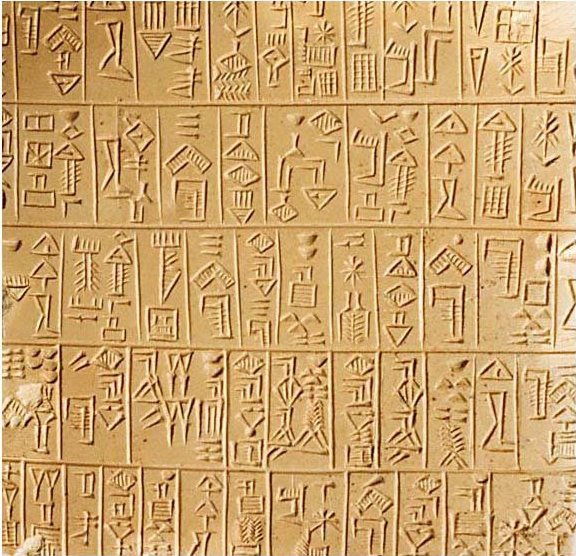
Sumerian inscription on a ceramic stone plaque.

Sumerian literature constitutes the earliest known corpus of recorded literature, including the religious writings and other traditional stories maintained by the Sumerian civilization and largely preserved by the later Akkadian and Babylonian empires. These records were written in the Sumerian language in the 3rd and 2nd millennia BC during the Middle Bronze Age.

The Sumerians invented one of the first writing systems, developing Sumerian cuneiform writing out of earlier proto-writing systems by about the 30th century BC. The Sumerian language remained in official and literary use in the Akkadian and Babylonian empires, even after the spoken language disappeared from the population; literacy was widespread, and the Sumerian texts that students copied heavily influenced later Babylonian literature. The basic genres of Sumerian literature were literary catalogues, narrative/mythological compositions, historical compositions, letters and legal documents, disputation poems, proverbs, and other texts which do not belong to these prior categories.

== Poetry ==
Most Sumerian literature is written in left-justified lines, and could contain line-based organization such as the couplet or the stanza, but the Sumerian definition of poetry is unknown. It is not rhymed, although “comparable effects were sometimes exploited.” Though rhymeless, the intricate patterns of similar and alternating sounds of vowels and consonants and the similar and alternating verb and noun endings give the language a musical resonance. It did not use syllabo-tonic versification, and the writing system precludes detection of rhythm, metre, rhyme, or alliteration. Quantitative analysis of other possible poetic features seems to be lacking, or has been intentionally hidden by the scribes who recorded the writing.

== Literary genres and topics ==
Genre is often the first judgement made of ancient literature; types of literature were not clearly defined, and all Sumerian literature incorporated poetic aspects. Sumerian poems demonstrate basic elements of poetry, including lines, imagery, and metaphor. Humans, gods, talking animals, and inanimate objects were all incorporated as characters. Suspense and humor were both incorporated into Sumerian stories. These stories were primarily shared orally, though they were also recorded by scribes. Some works were associated with specific musical instruments or contexts and may have been performed in specific settings. Sumerian literature did not use titles, instead being referred to by the work's first line.

Based on the categorization work of Miguel Civil, Modern assyriologists have divided the extant corpus of Sumerian literature into broad categories including "Literary Catalogs", "Narratives and Mythological Compositions", "Historical Compositions and Praise Poetry", "Letters, Letter Prayers and Laws", "Hymns and Songs", "Heterogenous Compositions" (including Wisdom literature), and "Proverbs".

=== Literary catalogs ===
- Sumerian scribal education focused on a curriculum called the Decad. Manuscripts of these ten texts are some of the best preserved Sumerian literature.

=== Narrative and mythological compositions ===
- Narratives featuring heroes include:
  - Stories from the Epic of Gilgamesh, such as Gilgamesh and Huwawa, Gilgamesh and the Bull of Heaven, Gilgamesh and Aga, Gilgamesh, Enkidu, and the Netherworld, and the Death of Gilgamesh.
  - Enmerkar and Lugalbanda: Enmerkar and the Lord of Aratta and Enmerkar and En-suhgir-ana as well as two tales of Lugalbanda during Enmerkar's campaign against Aratta: Lugalbanda in the Mountain Cave and Lugalbanda and the Anzud Bird
  - Inanna's Descent to the Underworld,
  - The Legend of Adapa
- Narratives featuring deities, such as Enki, Enlil (including Enlil and Ninlil), Inanna, Inanna and Dumuzid, and Ninurta (including Lugal-e and Angim)
- Other myths such as the Eridu Genesis

=== Historical compositions ===
- Praise Poems for kings
  - Third Dynasty of Ur - Ur-Nammu, Shulgi (including the Self-praise of Shulgi (Shulgi D), Amar-Sin, Shu-Sin, Ibbi-Sin
  - Isin dynasty - Ishbi-Erra, Shu-Ilishu, Iddin-Dagan, Ishme-Dagan, Lipit-Ishtar, Ur-Ninurta, Bur-Suen, Enlil-bani
  - Larsa dynasty - Gungunum, Sin-Iddinam, Sin-Iqisham, Warad-Sin, Rim-Sin
  - First Dynasty of Babylon - Hammurabi, Samsu-iluna, Abi-Eshuh
- City Laments such as Lament for Ur and Lament for Sumer and Ur
- King lists and other historical compositions such as Building of Ningirsu's temple

=== Letters and laws ===
- Letters include the Correspondence of the Kings of Ur as well as Isin, Larsa, and other dynasties.
- The Code of Ur-Nammu is attributed to Ur-Nammu, founder of the Third Dynasty of Ur
- Code of Lipit-Ishtar
- Code of Hammurabi

=== Hymns ===
- Hymns to deities in the Sumerian pantheon, such as the Hymn to Enlil, as well as Hymns dedicated to specific cities or temples, including the Zame Hymns, the Temple Hymns and the Kesh Temple Hymn

=== Disputation poems ===
- Debate between the hoe and the plough
- Debate between bird and fish
- Debate between sheep and grain
- Debate between Winter and Summer
- Debate between tree and reed
- Debate between silver and copper

=== Proverbs ===
- Anthologies of proverbs from Nippur, Susa, Ur, and Uruk

=== Heterogeneous compositions ===
- Instruction literature such as Instructions of Shuruppak
- Dialogue between a Man and His God

== See also ==
- Akkadian literature
- Ancient Egyptian literature
- Cuneiform law
- Electronic Text Corpus of Sumerian Literature

== Sources ==
- Black, Jeremy; Cunningham, Graham; Robson, Eleanor; Zólyomi, Gábor (2006). The Literature of Ancient Sumer. Oxford University Press. ISBN 9780199296330.
- Wolkstein, Diane (1983-08-03). Inanna. New York: Harper Collins. ISBN 978-0-06-090854-6.
