= Eridu Genesis =

Creation myth

Eridu Genesis, also called the Sumerian Creation Myth or Sumerian Flood Myth, is a work of Sumerian religion offering a description of the story surrounding how humanity was created by the gods, the circumstances leading to the origins of the first cities in Mesopotamia, how the office of kingship appeared, and the global flood myth.

Other creation myths include the Barton Cylinder, the Debate between sheep and grain and between Winter and Summer, also found at Nippur. Similar flood myths are described in the Atra-Hasis and the Epic of Gilgamesh; the former deals with the internal conflict of an organisation of Sumerian gods which they try to end by creating the first humans as labour slaves, followed by a mass reproduction of these creatures and a great flood triggered by Enlil. The Genesis creation narrative exhibits striking parallels; researchers have long assumed influence on the emergence of the Hebrew Bible.

== Fragments ==
The story is known from three fragments representing different versions of the narrative. One is a tablet excavated from the ancient Sumerian city known as Nippur. This tablet was discovered during the Expedition of the University of Pennsylvania in 1893, and the creation story was recognized by Arno Poebel in 1912. It is written in the Sumerian language and is dated to around 1600 BCE. The second fragment is from Ur, also written in Sumerian and from the same time period. The third is a bilingual Sumerian-Akkadian fragment from the Library of Ashurbanipal ca. 600 BCE.

In 2018, a new fragment of the Eridu Genesis story was published.

== Synopsis ==
The first 36 lines of the primary tablet from Nippur are lost, although they can be inferred to have discussed the creation of humans and animals, and likely spoke about the dissolute existence of humankind prior to civilization (as is indicated by the fragment from Ur). The surviving portion begins with a monologue from Nintur, the goddess who gave birth to humankind, where she calls humans from a vagrant existence as nomad to build cities, temples, and become both sedentary and civilized. After the monologue, there is another missing section that only resumes after another 36 lines, and at this point humans are still in a nomadic state; the missing section may have spoken of an initial unsuccessful attempt by humans to establish civilization.

When the text resumes, Nintur is still planning on providing kingship and organization to humans. Then, the first cities are named (beginning with Eridu, whose leadership Nintur placed under Enki), then Badtibira, Larak, Sippar, and finally Shuruppak. The cities were established as distributive (fr: Économie distributive) (not monetary) economies. Another lacuna (missing section) of 34 lines proceeds. The fragment from the Library of Ashurbanipal, as well as independent evidence from the Sumerian King List, suggests this section included the naming of more cities and their rulers.

Next comes the statement that humans began to make noises that annoyed the gods: Enlil, master of the universe and ruling this early culture down from the cosmic freshwater ocean, was entirely unable to sleep due to this disturbance and made the radical decision to deal with this by destroying humanity with a flood. The god Enki, living in the lower part of the cosmic freshwater ocean, informs one human, Ziusudra (likely a priest), of this decision and advises him to build a boat to save both himself and one couple of every living creature. Ziusudra builds the boat, boards it with his family and the animals, and the gods unleash the flood, although the exact phrasing is unclear as another lacuna appears in this section. Mankind and the rest of life survives, and again, the text breaks off.

== Flood myth ==
=== In Eridu Genesis ===
Before the missing section, the gods have decided to send a flood to destroy humanity. Enki, equivalent of Babylonian Ea, warns Ziusudra, the ruler of Shuruppak, to build a large boat, the construction manual of which has also been lost.

When the tablet resumes, it describes the flood. A terrible storm rages for seven days and nights. "The huge boat had been tossed about on the great waters." Then Utu (Sun) appears and Ziusudra opens a window, prostrates himself, and sacrifices an ox and a sheep.

After another break, the text resumes with the flood apparently over, and Ziusudra prostrating himself before the sky god An and the wind-god Enlil, who give him "breath eternal" for "preserving the animals and the seed of mankind". The remainder is lost.

The Epic of Ziusudra adds an element at lines 258–261 not found in other versions, that after the river flood "king Ziusudra ... they caused to dwell in the land of the country of Dilmun, the place where the sun rises". In this version of the story, Ziusudra's boat floats down the Euphrates river into the Persian Gulf (rather than up onto a mountain, or up-stream to Kish). The Sumerian word KUR in line 140 of the Gilgamesh flood myth was interpreted to mean "mountain" in Akkadian, although in Sumerian, KUR means "mountain" but also "land", especially a foreign country, as well as "the Underworld".

=== Historical context ===
Some modern scholars including Kim San-hae believe the Sumerian deluge story corresponds to localized river flooding at Shuruppak (now Tell Fara, Iraq) and various other cities as far north as Kish, as revealed by a layer of riverine sediments, radiocarbon dated to c. 2900 BCE, which interrupt the continuity of settlement. Polychrome pottery from the Jemdet Nasr period (c. 3000–2900 BCE) was discovered immediately below this Shuruppak flood stratum. None of the antediluvian rulers has been verified as historical by archaeological excavations and inscriptions, but the Sumerians purported them to have lived in the mythical era before the great deluge.

== See also ==
- Atra-Hasis
- Creation myth
- Deluge (mythology)
- Enūma Eliš
- Epic of Gilgamesh
- Gilgamesh flood myth
- Mesopotamian mythology
- Song of the hoe
- Sumerian literature
