= Samuel Noah Kramer =

American Assyriologist (1897–1990)

- Samuel Noah Kramer
- Born: September 28, 1897; Zhashkiv, Kyiv Governorate, Russian Empire
- Died: November 26, 1990 (aged 93); Philadelphia, Pennsylvania, U.S.

Samuel Noah Kramer (September 28, 1897 – November 26, 1990) was one of the world's leading Assyriologists, an expert in Sumerian history and Sumerian language. After high school, he attended Temple University, before Dropsie University and the University of Pennsylvania, all in Philadelphia.

Among scholars, his work is considered transformative for the field of Sumerian history. His popular book History Begins at Sumer made Sumerian literature accessible to the general public.

== Biography ==
Kramer was born on September 28, 1897, in Zhashkiv near Uman in the Kyiv Governorate, Russian Empire (modern day Ukraine), the son of Benjamin and Yetta Kramer. His family was Jewish. In 1905, as a result of the anti-Semitic pogroms by mobs following the October Manifesto of Emperor Nicholas II of Russia, his family emigrated to Philadelphia, where his father established a Hebrew school. After graduating from South Philadelphia High School, obtaining an Academic Diploma, Kramer tried a variety of occupations, including teaching in his father's school, becoming a writer and becoming a businessman.

Concerning the time when he began to approach the age of thirty, still without a career, he later stated in his autobiography, In the World of Sumer: "Finally it came to me that I might well go back to my beginnings and try to utilize the Hebrew learning on which I had spent so much of my youth, and relate it in some way to an academic future".

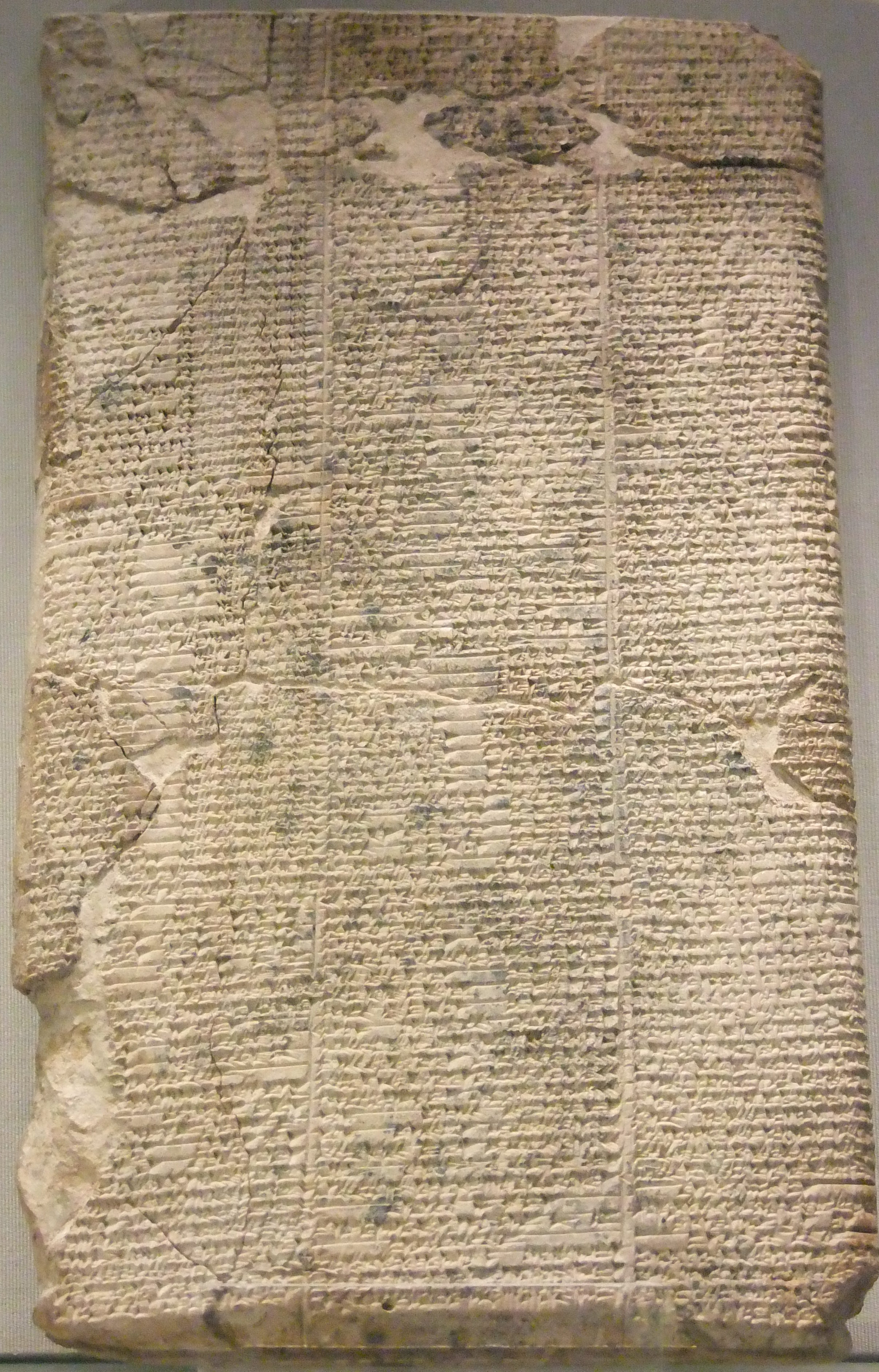
The Lament for Ur at the Louvre Museum in Paris. The Lament was one of several literary works that Kramer studied.

He enrolled at Dropsie College for Hebrew and Cognate Learning in Philadelphia, and became passionately interested in Egyptology. He then transferred to the Oriental Studies Department of the University of Pennsylvania, working with the "brilliant young Ephraim Avigdor Speiser, who was to become one of the world's leading figures in Near Eastern Studies". Speiser was trying to decipher cuneiform tablets of the Late Bronze Age dating from about 1300 BC; it was now that Kramer began his lifelong work in understanding the cuneiform writing system.

Kramer earned his PhD in 1929, and was famous for assembling tablets recounting single stories that had become distributed among different institutions around the world. He was elected to the American Philosophical Society in 1949. He retired from formal academic life in 1968, but remained very active throughout his post-retirement years. He was elected to the American Academy of Arts and Sciences in 1971.

In his autobiography published in 1986, he sums up his accomplishments

First, and most important, is the role I played in the recovery, restoration, and resurrection of Sumerian literature, or at least of a representative cross section [...]. But through my efforts several thousand Sumerian literary tablets and fragments have been made available to cuneiformists, a basic reservoir of unadulterated data that will endure for many decades to come. Second, I endeavored [...] to make available reasonably reliable translations of many of these documents to the academic community, and especially to the anthropologist, historian, and humanist. Third, I have helped to spread the name of Sumer to the world at large, and to make people aware of the crucial role the Sumerians played in the ascent of civilized man.

— Samuel Noah Kramer, In the World of Sumer: An Autobiography

He was married to Milly Tokarsky, a Chicago mathematics teacher.

Kramer died of throat cancer at age 93 on November 26, 1990, in Philadelphia.

== Selected writings ==
- Kramer, Samuel Noah (1944). Sumerian Mythology: A Study of Spiritual and Literary Achievement in the Third Millennium B.C. American Philosophical Society. Revised edition: 1961.
- Kramer, Samuel Noah (1981). History Begins at Sumer: Thirty-Nine Firsts in Man's Recorded History (3 ed.). University of Pennsylvania Press. ISBN 0-8122-7812-7. First edition: 1956 (Twenty-Five Firsts). Second Edition: 1959 (Twenty-Seven Firsts).
- Kramer, Samuel Noah (1963). The Sumerians: Their History, Culture, and Character Samuel Noah Kramer (PDF). University of Chicago Press. ISBN 0-226-45238-7.
- Kramer, Samuel Noah (1967). Cradle of Civilization: Picture-text survey that reconstructs the history, politics, religion and cultural achievements of ancient Sumer, Babylonia and Assyria. Time-Life: Great Ages of Man: A History of the World's Cultures. ISBN 9780809403325.
- Wolkstein, Diane; Kramer, Samuel Noah (1983). Inanna, Queen of Heaven and Earth: Her Stories and Hymns from Sumer. New York: Harper & Row. ISBN 0-06-090854-8.
- Kramer, Samuel Noah (1988a). In the World of Sumer: An Autobiography. Wayne State University Press. ISBN 0-8143-2121-6.

== See also ==
- Eridu Genesis
- Inanna
- Lament for Sumer and Ur
- Sumerian literature
