= George Aaron Barton =

Canadian writer, academic and clergyman (1859 – 1942)

The Reverend George Aaron Barton
- Born: 12 November 1859; East Farnham, Canada East, Canada
- Died: 28 June 1942 (aged 82); Weston, Massachusetts, US
- Spouses: Caroline Brewer Danforth (m. 1884; died 1930); Katherine Blye Hagy

Ecclesiastical career
- Religion: Christianity (Anglican)
- Church: Episcopal Church (United States)
- Ordained: 1918 (deacon); 1919 (priest)

Academic background
- Education: Haverford College; Harvard University

Academic work
- Discipline: Biblical studies; history; linguistics
- Institutions: Bryn Mawr College; University of Pennsylvania

George Aaron Barton (12 November 1859 – 28 June 1942) was a Canadian author, Episcopal clergyman, and professor of Semitic languages and the history of religion.

== Biography ==
Barton was born on 12 November 1859 in East Farnham, Canada East, Canada. After attending Oakwood Seminary in Union Springs, New York. Barton became a minister in the Religious Society of Friends and continued his education at Haverford College, completing a MA in 1885. He taught in Rhode Island from 1884 to 1889, then earned a PhD at Harvard and became a professor of Semitic languages at Bryn Mawr College in 1891.

In 1922 Barton moved to the University of Pennsylvania, where he was professor of Semitic languages and the history of religion. He retired in 1931 and held the title of professor emeritus until his death. He specialized in many subjects, particularly in Semitic languages. His many publications cover a wide range of topics in areas such as biblical studies, religion, and linguistics along with translations of Sumerian cuneiform tablets. He was fascinated by bible archeology and wrote a text book on the subject, published in 1916, along with other publications on similar subjects.

Barton specialized in translations of Sumerian and Akkadian tablets, seals and cylinders. He notably translated a set of Sumerian tablets recovered in 1896–1898 by the University of Pennsylvania's excavation at Nippur initially labelled as "Miscellaneous Babylonian Inscriptions", including creation myths known as the Barton Cylinder and the Debate between sheep and grain. These were later revised by Samuel Noah Kramer. He also served as a deacon and priest within the Episcopal Church.

Barton died in Weston, Massachusetts, on 28 June 1942.

== Positions, awards, and accolades ==
- 1911 Elected member of the American Philosophical Society.
- 1891–1922 Professor of Semitic languages, Bryn Mawr College.
- 1922–1931 Professor of Semitic languages and the history of religion, University of Pennsylvania.
- 1932–1942 Professor Emeritus, University of Pennsylvania
- 1921–1934 Director of the American School of Oriental Research, Baghdad.

== Books ==
- Barton, G.A., 1894, Native Israelitish Deities, Oriental Club of Philadelphia.
- Barton, G.A., 1902, A Sketch of Semitic Origins: Social and Religious, The Macmillan Company.
- Barton, G.A., 1904, A Year's Wandering in Bible Lands, Ferris & Leach.
- Barton, G.A., 1905–14, The Haverford Library Collection of Cuneiform Tablets, or Documents from the Temple Archives of Telloh. Parts 1–3. New Haven.
- Barton, G.A., 1906, Traces of the Diatessaron of Tatian in Harclean Syriac Lectionaries, s.n.
- Barton, G.A., 1908, A Critical and Exegetical Commentary on the Book of Ecclesiastes, T & T Clark Ltd, Edinburgh.
- Barton, G.A., 1909, Haverford Library Collection of Cuneiform Tablets or Documents from the Temple Archives of Telloh, Volumes 1-3, The John C. Winston Company.
- Barton, G.A., 1911, Commentary on the Book of Job, The Macmillan Company.
- Barton, G.A., 1912, The Heart of the Christian Message, The Macmillan Company.
- Barton, G.A., 1913, The Origin and Development of Babylonian Writing, J. C. Hinrichs.
- Barton, G.A., 1915, Sumerian Business and Administrative Documents from the Earliest Times to the Dynasty of Agade, Harvard University Museum.
- Barton, G.A., 1916, Archæology and the Bible, American Sunday School Union. Re-printed BiblioBazaar (26 November 2009) ISBN 1-117-13138-6
- Barton, G.A., 1917, New Babylonian Material Concerning Creation and Paradise, The University of Chicago Press.
- Barton, G.A., 1918, The Religion of Ancient Israel, The Macmillan Company.
- Barton, G.A., 1918, Miscellaneous Babylonian Inscriptions, Volume 1, Yale University Press.
- Barton, G.A., 1919, The Religions of the World, The University of Chicago Press.
- Barton, G.A., 1922, Jesus of Nazareth: A Biography, The Macmillan Company.
- Barton, G.A., 1926, The Annual of the American Schools of Oriental Research, American Schools of Oriental Research.
- Barton, G.A., 1928, Studies in New Testament Christianity, University of Pennsylvania Press.
- Barton, G.A., 1928, Hittite Studies, Volumes 1-2, P. Geuthner.
- Barton, G.A., 1929, The Royal Inscriptions of Sumer and Akkad, Yale University press.
- Barton, G.A., 1930, A History of the Hebrew People from the Earliest Times to the Year 70 A.D.: Largely in the Language of Bible, The Century co.
- Barton, G.A., 1932, A Hittite Chrestomathy with Vocabulary, P. Geuthner.
- Barton, G.A., 1934, Christ and Evolution: A Study of the Doctrine of Redemption in the Light of Modern Knowledge, University of Pennsylvania Press.
- Barton, G.A., 1934, Semitic and Hamitic Origins: Social and Religious, University of Pennsylvania Press.
- Barton, G.A., 1936, The Apostolic Age and the New Testament, University of Pennsylvania Press.

== See also ==
- Christian O'Brien

Professional and academic associations
Preceded by Lewis B. Paton	President of the Society of Biblical; Literature and Exegesis; 1913	Succeeded by Nathaniel Schmidt
