= Family tree of the Babylonian gods =

Babylonian gods and goddesses family tree

The following is a family tree of gods and goddesses from Babylonian mythology.

Apsu | Tiamat
Mummu | Lahmu | Lahamu | Kingu
Anshar | Kishar
Anu | Antu
Damkina | Ea/Nudimmud | Ellil | Sin
Asaruludu | Marduk | Sarpanit | Ishtar (Note: Ishtar is sometimes considered the daughter of Anu instead.)
Nabu | Tashmetum

== See also ==
- Enūma Eliš
- List of Mesopotamian deities
