= Ki (goddess) =

Babylonian earth goddess

Ki (Sumerian: 𒀭𒆠) was the earth goddess in Sumerian religion, chief consort of the sky god An. In some legends, Ki and An were brother and sister, being the offspring of Anshar ("Sky Pivot") and Kishar ("Earth Pivot"), earlier personifications of the heavens and earth.

By her consort Anu (also known as Anunna), Ki gave birth to Anunnaki; the most prominent of these deities being Enlil, god of the air. According to legends, the heavens and earth were once inseparable until Enlil was born; Enlil cleaved the heavens and earth in two. An carried away the heavens. Ki, in company with Enlil, took the Earth. Ki marries her son, Enlil, and from this union all the plant and animal life on Earth is produced.

Some authorities question whether Ki was regarded as a deity since there is no evidence of a cult and the name appears only in a limited number of Sumerian creation texts. Samuel Noah Kramer identifies Ki with the Sumerian mother goddess Ninhursag and claims that they were originally the same figure.

She later developed into the Babylonian and Akkadian goddess Antu, consort of the god Anu (from Sumerian An).

== Family ==
Ki was the wife and chief consort of Anu, the god of the Sky. They are thought to be brother and sister, who could both be offspring of the god named Anshar (the sky pivot) and Kishar (the earth pivot). This makes Anshar and Kishar her father and mother.

Ki was a mother to one child, who was named Enlil. Her son Enlil, the god of Air, was part of the Anunnaki. Ki ends up marrying her son, Enlil, and according to the myth this was how the plants and animals were created on Earth.

== Cuneiform sign ==
Cuneiform Ki (k) (I) (Borger 2003 nr. 737; U+121A0 𒆠) is the sign for "earth". It is also read as GI_{5}, GUNNI (=KI.NE) "hearth", KARAŠ (=KI.KAL.BAD) "encampment, army", KISLAḪ (=KI.UD) "threshing floor", and SUR_{7} (=KI.GAG). In Akkadian orthography, it functions as a determiner for toponyms and has the syllabic values gi, ge, qi, and qe.
