= Umū dabrūtu =

Mesopotamian mythical creature

Umū dabrūtu, inscribed 𒌓𒈪 𒁕𒀊𒊒𒋾 u_{4}-mi da-ab-ru-ti and meaning "Violent Storms" (lit. "fierce day") was an ancient Mesopotamian mythical beast, demon or species of creature and one of the eleven monsters created by Tiāmat in her conflict with the younger gods in the Epic of Creation, Enûma Eliš. Its form is unknown but was probably a composite beast like its companions.

== Mythology ==
The Enûma Eliš relates that the Umū dabrūtu and its companions "bore cruel weapons, without fear of the fight". Their demise, however, was complete as Marduk is said to have overcome them and "broke their weapons and bound them (the creatures) to his feet". His transformation of them into benevolent apotropaic symbols to guard the gate of the Apsû, provides a precedent which would be imitated on the doorways of temples, palaces and homes.
