= Tiamat =

Primordial goddess of ancient Babylon religion

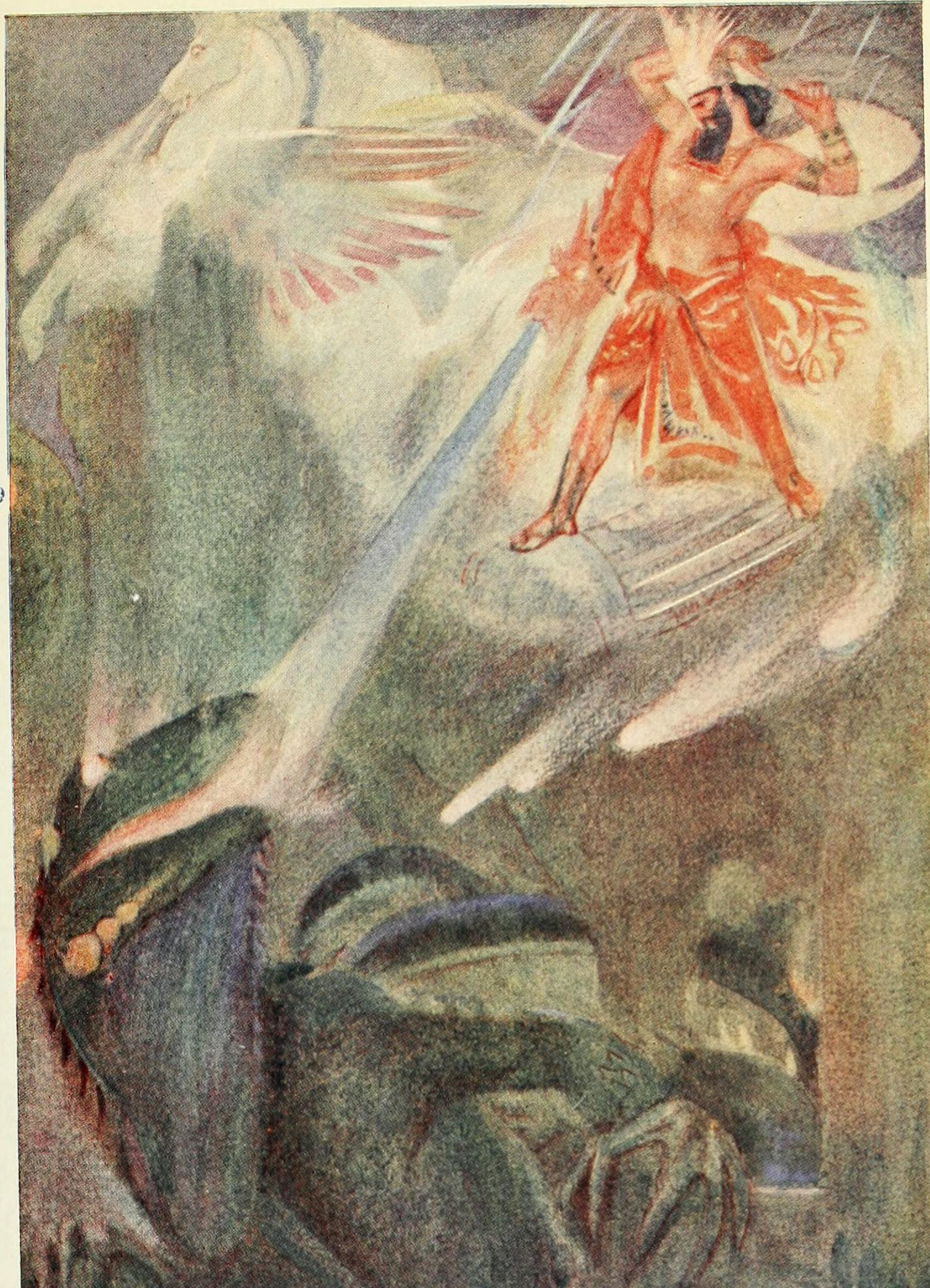
- "Mighty was he to look upon", illustration by Evelyn Paul, depicting Marduk (upper right) smiting Tiamat (bottom), Myths and Legends of Babylonia and Assyria, 1916

Genealogy
- Consort: Abzû; Qingu (after Abzû's death)
- Children: Qingu, Lahamu, Lahmu

In ancient Mesopotamian religion, Tiamat (Note: (Akkadian: 𒀭𒋾𒀀𒆳 ^{D}TI.AMAT or 𒀭𒌓𒌈 ^{D}TAM.TUM, Ancient Greek: Θαλάττη, romanized: Thaláttē)) is the cosmic ocean that mates with Abzû, the groundwater, to produce the Babylonian pantheon in the creation myth recorded in the Enūma Eliš ("When on High").

Tiamat is referred to as a woman, and has – at various points in the epic – a number of anthropomorphic features such as breasts and theriomorphic features such as a tail.

In the Enūma Eliš, written in the 2nd millennium BCE in Lower Mesopotamia in the Babylonian variety of the Akkadian language, Tiamat gives birth to the first generation of deities after mingling her waters with those of Abzû. The gods continue to reproduce, forming a new and noisy mass of divine children. Abzû, driven to violence by the noise they make, seeks to destroy them but is slain. Enraged, Tiamat wages war upon the children who killed him, bringing forth a series of monsters as weapons. She also takes a new consort, Qingu, and bestows on him the Tablet of Destinies, which represents legitimate divine rulership. Enki's son, the storm-god Marduk, eventually defeats her, but not before she conjures forth monsters whose bodies she fills with "poison instead of blood". Marduk dismembers her and constructs the elements of the cosmos from the parts.

== Etymology ==
Thorkild Jacobsen and Walter Burkert both argue for a connection with the Akkadian word for sea, tâmtu (𒀀𒀊𒁀), following an early form, tiʾamtum. Burkert continues by making a linguistic connection to Tethys. The later form Θαλάττη, thaláttē, which appears in the Hellenistic period Babylonian writer Berossus' first volume of universal history, is clearly related to Greek Θάλαττα, thálatta, an eastern Greek variant of Θάλασσα, thalassa, 'sea'. It is thought that the proper name tiʾamat, which is the vocative or construct form, was dropped in secondary translations of the original texts because some Akkadian copyists substituted the ordinary word tāmtu 'sea' for Tiamat, the two names having become essentially the same due to association. Tiamat also has been claimed to be cognate with the Northwest Semitic word tehom (Biblical Hebrew: תְּהוֹם, romanized: tǝhom, lit. 'deeps, abyss'), in the Genesis creation narrative in Genesis 1:2.

The Enūma Eliš is named for its incipit: "When on high [or: When above]", the heavens did not yet exist nor the earth below, Abzû the subterranean ocean was there, "the first, the begetter", and Tiamat, the overground sea, "she who bore them all"; they were "mixing their waters". It is thought that female deities are older than male ones in Mesopotamia, and Tiamat may have begun as part of the cult of Nammu, a female principle of a watery creative force with equally strong connections to the underworld, a cult that predates the appearance of Ea-Enki.

Harriet Crawford finds this "mixing of the waters" to be a natural feature of the middle Persian Gulf, where fresh waters from the Arabian aquifer mix and mingle with the salt waters of the sea. This characteristic is especially true of the region of Bahrain, whose name in Arabic means "two seas", and which is thought to be the site of Dilmun, the original site of the creation in the beliefs of Sumer. The difference in density of salt and fresh water drives a perceptible separation.

== Appearance and nature ==
In the Enūma Eliš, Tiamat’s physical description includes a tail, a thigh, "lower parts" (which shake together), a belly, an udder, ribs, a neck, a head, a skull, eyes, nostrils, a mouth, and lips. She has insides (possibly "entrails"), a heart, arteries, and blood.

Tiamat was once regarded as a sea serpent or dragon, although Assyriologist Alexander Heidel has previously recognized that a "dragon form can not be imputed to Tiamat with certainty." She is still often referred to as a monster, though this identification has been credibly challenged. In the Enūma Eliš, Tiamat is clearly portrayed as a mother of monsters but, before this, she is just as clearly portrayed as a mother to all the gods.

== Mythology ==
With Tiamat, Abzû fathered the elder deities Lahmu and Lahamu 'Hairy', a title given to the gatekeepers at Enki's É'engurra-temple in Eridu. Lahmu and Lahamu, in turn, were the parents of the 'ends' of the heavens (Anshar, from an-šar, 'heaven-totality/end') and the earth (Kishar 'earth's ends'); Anshar and Kishar were considered to meet at the horizon, becoming, thereby, the parents of Anu (Heaven) and Ki (Earth).

Tiamat was the "shining" personification of the sea who roared and smote in the chaos of original creation. She and Abzû filled the cosmic abyss with the primeval waters. She is "Ummu-Hubur [lit. 'Mother-Watercourse'] who formed all things".

In the myth recorded in cuneiform, Enki correctly believed that Abzû was planning to murder the younger deities as a consequence of his agitation at the noisy tumult they created. This premonition led Enki to capture Abzû and hold him prisoner beneath Abzû’s own temple, the É Abzû 'temple of Abzû'. This angered their son, Qingu, who reported the event to Tiamat, who then fashioned eleven monsters to battle the deities and avenge Abzû's death. These were her own offspring: Bašmu 'Venomous Snake', Ušumgallu 'Great Dragon', Mušmaḫḫū 'Exalted Serpent', Mušḫuššu 'Furious Snake', Laḫmu the 'Hairy One', Ugallu the 'Big Weather-Beast', Uridimmu 'Mad Hound', Girtablullû or Scorpion man, Umū dabrūtu 'Violent Storms', Kulullû 'Fish-Man', and Kusarikku 'Bull-Man'.

Tiamat possessed the Tablet of Destinies, and in the primordial battle she gave the relic to Qingu, the deity she had chosen as her lover and the leader of her host, who was also one of her children. The terrified deities were rescued by Anu, who secured their promise to revere him as "king of the gods." He fought Tiamat with the arrows of the winds, a net, a club, and an invincible spear. Anu was first replaced by Enlil, and, in the late version that has survived after the First Babylonian dynasty, subsequently by Marduk, his son.

And the lord stood upon Tiamat's hinder parts,
And with his merciless club he smashed her skull.
He cut through the channels of her blood,
And he made the North wind bear it away into secret places.

Slicing Tiamat in half, Marduk made from her ribs the vault of heaven and earth. Her weeping eyes became the sources of the Tigris and the Euphrates, her tail became the Milky Way. With the approval of the elder deities, he took the Tablet of Destinies from Qingu, and installed himself as the head of the Babylonian pantheon. Qingu was captured and later slain: his red blood, mixed with the red clay of the Earth, would form the body of humankind, created to serve the younger Igigi deities.

The principal theme of the epic is the rightful elevation of Marduk to command over all the deities. American Assyriologist Ephraim Avigdor Speiser remarked in 1942 that "It has long been realized that the Marduk epic, for all its local coloring and probable elaboration by the Babylonian theologians, reflects in substance older Sumerian material... The exact Sumerian prototype, however, has not turned up so far." However, this surmise that the Babylonian version of the story is based upon a modified version of an older epic, in which Enlil, not Marduk, was the god who slew Tiamat, has been more recently dismissed as "distinctly improbable".

== Interpretations ==
It was once thought that the myth of Tiamat was one of the earliest recorded versions of a Chaoskampf, a mythological motif that generally involves the battle between a culture hero and a chthonic or aquatic monster, serpent, or dragon. Chaoskampf motifs in other mythologies perhaps linked to the Tiamat myth include: the Hittite Illuyanka myth; the Greek lore of Apollo's killing of the Python as a necessary action to take over the Pythia at Delphi; and to Genesis in the Hebrew Bible.

A number of writers have put forth ideas about Tiamat associated with cultural feminist notions of the innate differences in the sexes: Robert Graves, for example, considered Tiamat's death by Marduk as evidence for his hypothesis of an ancient shift in power from a matriarchal society to a patriarchy. The theory suggested that Tiamat and other ancient monster figures were depictions of former supreme deities of peaceful, woman-centered religions. Their defeat at the hands of a male hero corresponded to the overthrow of these matristic religions and societies by male-dominated ones.

== In popular culture ==
The depiction of Tiamat as a multi-headed dragon was popularized in the 1970s as a fixture of Dungeons & Dragons, a role-playing game inspired by earlier sources which associate Tiamat with later mythological characters, such as Lotan (Leviathan).

In the Monsterverse, an unseen monster is designated as "Titanus Tiamat" in Godzilla: King of the Monsters. Tiamat fully appears as an aquatic serpentine dragon in the Godzilla vs Kong prequel graphic novel Godzilla Dominion before making her live action debut in Godzilla x Kong: The New Empire.

The eighth novel of the science fiction series, the Expanse is titled Tiamat's Wrath, referencing the primordial chaos goddess as a thematic parallel to a cataclysmic interstellar conflict fought between two ancient and immensely powerful alien entities long before humanity even came into existence.

== See also ==
- Nun (mythology) – ancient Egyptian deity
- Chaos (cosmogony) – ancient Greek deity
- Ymir – an ancient Norse deity
- Pangu – ancient Chinese deity
- Yam Suph: the sea of The Exodus parted by Moses
- Sea of Suf – a primordial sea in the World of Darkness in Mandaean cosmology

== Bibliography ==
- King, Leonard William (1902a). The Seven Tablets of Creation (PDF). Vol. I: English Translations etc.
- King, Leonard William (1902b). The Seven Tablets of Creation (PDF). Vol. II: Supplementary Texts.
- Jacobsen, Thorkild (1968). "The Battle between Marduk and Tiamat". Journal of the American Oriental Society. 88 (1): 104–108. doi:10.2307/597902. JSTOR 597902.
