= Lahmu =

Mesopotamian apotropaic figure

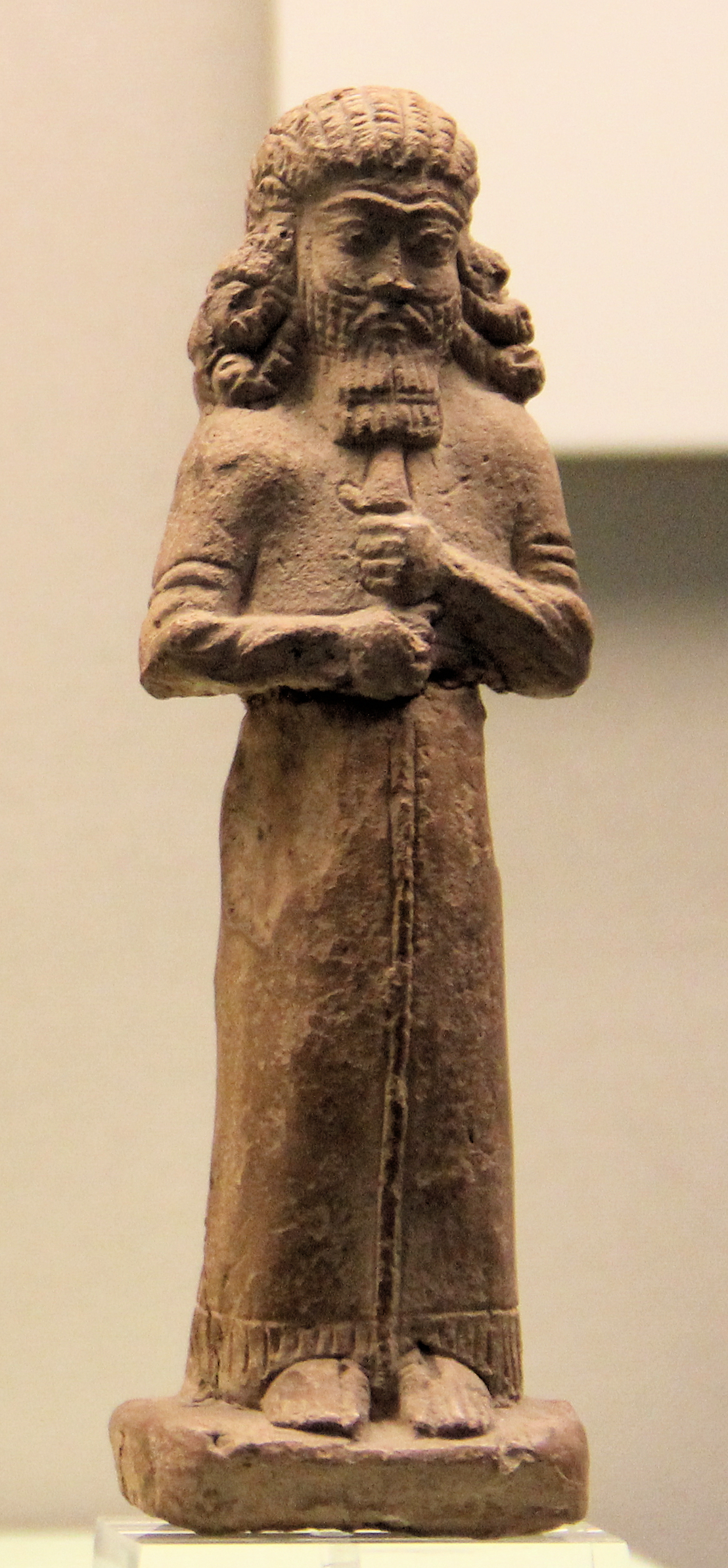
- Lahmu, the protective spirit from Nineveh, 900–612 BCE, Mesopotamia. British Museum.

Genealogy
- Parents: Abzu and Tiamat (Enuma Elish) or Anu's ancestors such as Dari and Duri (Anu theogony)
- Consort: his sister Lahamu (Enuma Elish)
- Children: Anshar and Kishar (Enuma Elish) or Alala and Belili (Anu theogony)

Laḫmu (𒀭𒌓𒈬 or 𒀭𒈛𒈬, ^{d}laḫ-mu, lit. 'hairy one') is a class of apotropaic creatures from Mesopotamian mythology. While the name has its origin in a Semitic language, Lahmu was present in Sumerian sources in pre-Sargonic times already.

== Iconography and character ==
Laḫmu is depicted as a bearded man wearing a red garment (tillû). Some texts mention a spade as the attribute of Lahmu. The artistic representations are sometimes called "naked heroes" in literature.

Lahmu were associated with water. They were generally believed to be servants of Enki/Ea (and later on of his son Marduk as well), and were described as the doorkeepers of his temple in Eridu and possibly as the "guardians of the sea" known from some versions of the Atra-Hasis. Some texts list as many as 50 Lahmu in such roles. It is possible they were initially river spirits believed to take care of domestic and wild animals.

Apotropaic creatures such as Lahmu were not regarded as demonic; they protected the household from demons. However, myths may depict them as defeated and subsequently reformed enemies of the gods. At the same time, they were not viewed as fully divine, as their names were rarely if ever, preceded by the dingir sign ("divine determinative") and they do not wear horned tiaras (a symbol of divinity) in art.

In apotropaic rituals, Lahmu was associated with other monsters, for example mušḫuššu, bašmu (a type of mythical snake), kusarikku (bison-men associated with Shamash) or Ugallu.

== As a cosmological being ==
In god lists, a singular Lahmu sometimes appears among the ancestors of Anu alongside a feminine counterpart (Lahamu), following the primordial pair Duri and Dari (eternity) and other such figures and preceding Alala and Belili. Assyriolgist Frans Wiggermann, who specializes in the study of origins and development of Mesopotamian apotropaic creatures and demons, assumes that this tradition had its origin in Upper Mesopotamia. Lahmu and Lahamu are not necessarily siblings in this context. Long lists of divine ancestors of Enlil or Anu from some god lists were at least sometimes meant to indicate that the gods worshiped by the Mesopotamians were not the product of incestuous relationships. Wilfred G. Lambert wrote, "The history of these two [theogonies] shows that steps were sometimes taken quite specifically to avoid the implication of incest, which was socially taboo."

In the Enūma Eliš, compiled at a later date and relying on the tradition mentioned above, Lahmu is the first-born son of Abzu and Tiamat. He and his sister Laḫamu are the parents of Anshar and Kishar, parents of Anu and thus ancestors of Ea and Marduk according to this specific theogony. Both of them bestow 3 names upon Marduk after his victory. However, Lahmu – presumably of the same variety as the apotropaic rather than cosmological one – also appears among Tiamat's monsters.

A fragmentary Assyrian rewrite of Enuma Elish replaced Marduk with Ashur, equated with Anshar, with Lahmu and Lahamu replacing Ea/Enki and Damkina. Wilfred G. Lambert described the result as "completely superficial in that it leaves the plot in chaos by attributing Marduk's part to his great-grandfather, without making any attempt to iron out the resulting confusion."

== Disproven theories ==
19th and early 20th century authors asserted that Lahmu represents the zodiac, parent stars, or constellations.

== See also ==
- Lahamu
- Apotropaic magic

== Sources ==
- Lambert, Wilfred G. (2013). "The Theogony of Dunnu". Babylonian Creation Myths. Penn State University Press. pp. 387–395. doi:10.1515/9781575068619-030. ISBN 978-1-57506-861-9.
- Wiggermann, F. A. M. (1992). Mesopotamian Protective Spirits: The Ritual Texts. BRILL. pp. 49, 86. ISBN 978-90-72371-52-2.
- Michael Jordan, Encyclopedia of Gods, Kyle Cathie Limited, 2002
- Black, Jeremy and Green, Anthony, Gods, Demons and Symbols of Ancient Mesopotamia, University of Texas Press, Austin, 2003.
