= Anshar =

Mesopotamian primordial god

- Primordial god
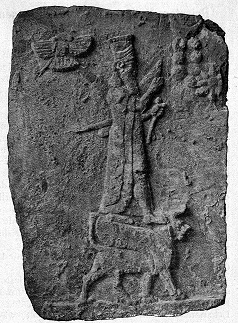
- Ashur standing on a bull
- Other names: Anshargal

Genealogy
- Parents: Lahmu and Lahamu
- Spouse: Kishar
- Offspring: Anu

Anshar ( 𒀭𒊹 AN.ŠAR₂, Neo-Assyrian Akkadian: 𒀭𒊹, lit. 'whole sky') was a Mesopotamian god regarded as a primordial king of the gods. He was not actively worshipped. He was regarded as the father of Anu. In the first millennium BCE his name came to be used as a logographic representation of the head god in the Assyrian state pantheon, Ashur. He is attested in a number of god lists, such as An = Anum, and in literary compositions, including the Enūma Eliš.

== Name and character ==
Anshar's name was written in cuneiform as AN.ŠÁR. It can be translated from Sumerian as "the whole heaven". Benjamin R. Foster suggests that together with Kishar he was understood as the personification of the circle of the horizon, which represented the totality of heaven and earth. It was believed that he was involved in creation of the world and the other deities. He was regarded as a primordial deity. As such, he was an abstract figure who was not actively worshiped.

The theonym Anshargal attested in god lists is presumed to be a variant of Anshar.

== Associations with other deities ==
The goddess Kishar ("whole earth") was regarded as Anshar's spouse. They appear together in the Enūma Eliš and in an exorcistic formula referred to as Gattung A (following a convention established by Erich Ebeling), which opens with an invocation of them both. However, in a late astronomical commentary (tablet BM 68593) Kishar is instead the spouse of the star Gudanna (^{mul}gud-an-na), described as the "Enlil of Shuruppak".

=== Anshar and Anu ===
Anshar could be regarded as the father of Anu. He is one of the deities belonging to the so-called "theogony of Anu", a conventional term used in Assyriology to refer to listings of the latter's ancestors. They are typically less systematic than better known enumerations of the ancestors of Enlil, and in many cases Alala and Belili are Anu's parents instead of Anshar and Kishar. The oldest attestation of the tradition presenting Anshar as Anu s father is the Old Babylonian forerunner of the god list An = Anum, but no other references to it are known from this period.

Anu and Anshar could alternatively be equated with each other. A god list with the incipit Anšar = Anu was in circulation in the first millennium BCE. In the bilingual poem Exaltation of Ishtar, Anshar corresponds to Anu in the Akkadian version, with Kishar analogously representing Antu. An = Anum (tablet I, line 8) equates Anshar with both Anu and Antu (^{d}a-nu-um u ^{d}a-n-tu). Further examples are available from various scholarly texts from Uruk postdating the Neo-Babylonian period, in which ^{d}AN.ŠÁR(.GAL) is used as a logographic representation of Anu's name. However, Julia Krul stresses that equations of deities with their fathers represent speculation mostly typical for god lists, and did not necessarily influence the sphere of cult.

=== Anshar and Ashur ===
As attested for the first time in sources from the reign of Sargon II, with the only possible earlier forerunner being a bead inscription from the reign of either Tukulti-Ninurta I or Tukulti-Ninurta II, in Assyria the logogram AN.ŠÁR could be used to represent the name of the supreme deity of the state pantheon, Ashur. Under Sennacherib it became the conventional writing of Ashur's name. The goal of this equation was to establish the seniority of Ashur over Marduk, who in the light of the genealogy of deities presented in the Enūma Eliš was a descendant of Anshar.

Paul-Alain Beaulieu suggests that the logogram AN.ŠÁR also designates Assur in texts from Neo-Babylonian Uruk. He points out that they indicate AN.ŠÁR was actively worshiped, which would be unusual if the name referred to the primordial god. A small shrine dedicated to AN.ŠÁR is attested in sources from the Neo-Babylonian and early Achaemenid periods, but it is uncertain when his cult was introduced to the city. It might have originally been established either when the city was under the control of the Neo-Assyrian Empire, or later on by a group of Assyrian immigrants. In the former case, the worship of Ashur in Uruk would most likely reflect a political alliance between local elites and the Assyrian state, as there is no evidence his cult was imposed in any Babylonian cities.

Beaulieu argues that the identification between Anshar and Ashur was additionally meant to facilitate equating the latter with Anu. He suggests this might have been the reason why Anu's prominence in the local pantheon of Uruk increased from the fifth century BCE onward. Julia Krul disagrees with this proposal, and points out that while it is plausible that in Uruk the clergy might have accepted the equation between Anshar and Ashur, there is no evidence that the latter was viewed as related to Anu, or that theological ideas pertaining to him influenced Anu's cult.

Piotr Steinkeller notes that the association between Anshar and Ashur might explain why Kakka, a deity chiefly worshiped in Upper Mesopotamia rather than in Babylonia, appears as a messenger of the former in the Enūma Eliš. (Note: However, in the Sultantepe version of the myth Nergal and Ereshkigal Kakka is a messenger of Anu instead.)

== Mythology ==
=== Enūma Eliš ===
Anshar's role in the conventional genealogy of Anu resulted in his incorporation into the Enūma Eliš. The text does not explicitly state whether he and Kishar are the children of Lahmu and Lahamu, or instead a second pair of Apsu's and Tiamat's children. However, the former option is considered the correct interpretation. Anshar serves for a time as the king of the gods. His grandson Ea informs him about Tiamat plotting against the younger deities, which prompts Anshar to blame him and task him with finding a solution. After he fails, Anshar sends Anu to attempt to solve the issue, but he is similarly unsuccessful. Ea eventually convinces him that the only god who can defeat Tiamat is his own son, Marduk. Anshar then summons his attendant Kakka to inform Lahmu and Lahamu about his decision to rely on Marduk. After emerging victorious, Marduk replaces Anshar as the new king of the gods. The latter is the first deity to provide him with new names. He states that Marduk will be known as Asalluhi and subsequently partakes in further name-giving alongside Lahmu and Lahamu.

In an Assyrian recension of the Enūma Eliš, known only from a number of incomplete late copies from Assur and Nineveh tentatively dated to the reign from Sennacherib, the logogram AN.ŠÁR is used to refer to both Anshar himself and to Ashur, who replaces Marduk as the protagonist, but is also identified with the aforementioned primordial deity. As noted by Wilfred G. Lambert, the change is "superficial" and "leaves the plot in chaos by attributing Marduk's part to his great-grandfather, without making any attempt to iron out the resulting confusion". This rewrite might be referenced in a late Assyrian commentary on the Enūma Eliš, which states that Anshar came into being "when heaven and underworld had not been created" but "city and house were in existence", which reflects the role of Marduk (and thus Ashur) more accurately than that of Anshar himself.

An esoteric commentary linking passages from the Enūma Eliš with various ritual observances from Babylon states that Anshar sending Anu to confront Tiamat corresponds to the celebrations during which Mandanu headed to Ḫursagkalamma (Kish).

=== Other compositions ===
Anshar is referenced in passing in the myth Enlil and Sud and in a hymn to Haya from the reign of Rim-Sîn I.

Anshar appears in multiple lists of defeated primordial figures alongside Asag, Enmesharra, Lugaldukuga, Qingu and others. Such enumerations are embedded in a number of expository or ritual texts. In one case, Anshar is equated in this context with the minor underworld god Alla.

A royal hymn from the reign of Nebuchadnezzar I focused on establishing a connection between him and Enmeduranki, a mythical king of Sippar, mentions Anshar in passing and refers to Shuzianna as his sister.

A myth only known from five fragments dated to either Seleucid or Parthian period, four of which come from the same copy, refers to Anshar as the father of Anu. While restoration of the text remains uncertain, it is possible that it describes his death at the hands of Enki and Ninamakalla, (Note: This goddess is addressed as Enki's sister in this composition, but she is otherwise only known from the Sultantepe god list, where she occurs after Nanaya and Tashmetum. Wilfred G. Lambert proposed identifying her with Nanaya.) which would indicate it preserves a succession narrative in which the actively worshiped members of the Mesopotamian pantheon depose a generation of primordial deities.

A reference to Anshar has been identified in a quotation from Eudemus of Rhodes preserved by the Neo-Platonic philosopher Damascius, according to which in Babylonian cosmology figures named Assōros and Kissarē were the parents of Anos (Anu), Illinos (Enlil) and Aos (Ea). It is presumed that Eudemus relied on a source related to the tradition represented by the Enūma Eliš, but not identical with it.
