= Kishar =

Earth mother goddess

- Parents: Lahmu and Lahamu
- Consort: brother Anshar

In the Babylonian epic Enuma Elish, Kishar (Akkadian: 𒆠𒊹, romanized: Kišar) is the daughter of Lahamu and Lahmu, the first children of Tiamat and Abzu. She is the female principle, sister and wife of Anshar, the male principle, and the mother of Anu. Kishar may represent the earth as a counterpart to Anshar, the sky, and can be seen as an earth mother goddess. Her name also means "Whole Earth".

Kishar appears only once in Enuma Elish, in the opening lines of the epic, and then disappears from the remainder of the story. She appears only occasionally in other first millennium BCE texts, where she can be equated with the goddess Antu.
