= Anu =

Ancient Mesopotamian god of the sky; god of all gods

Anu 𒀭𒀀𒉡
- Sky Father, King of the Gods
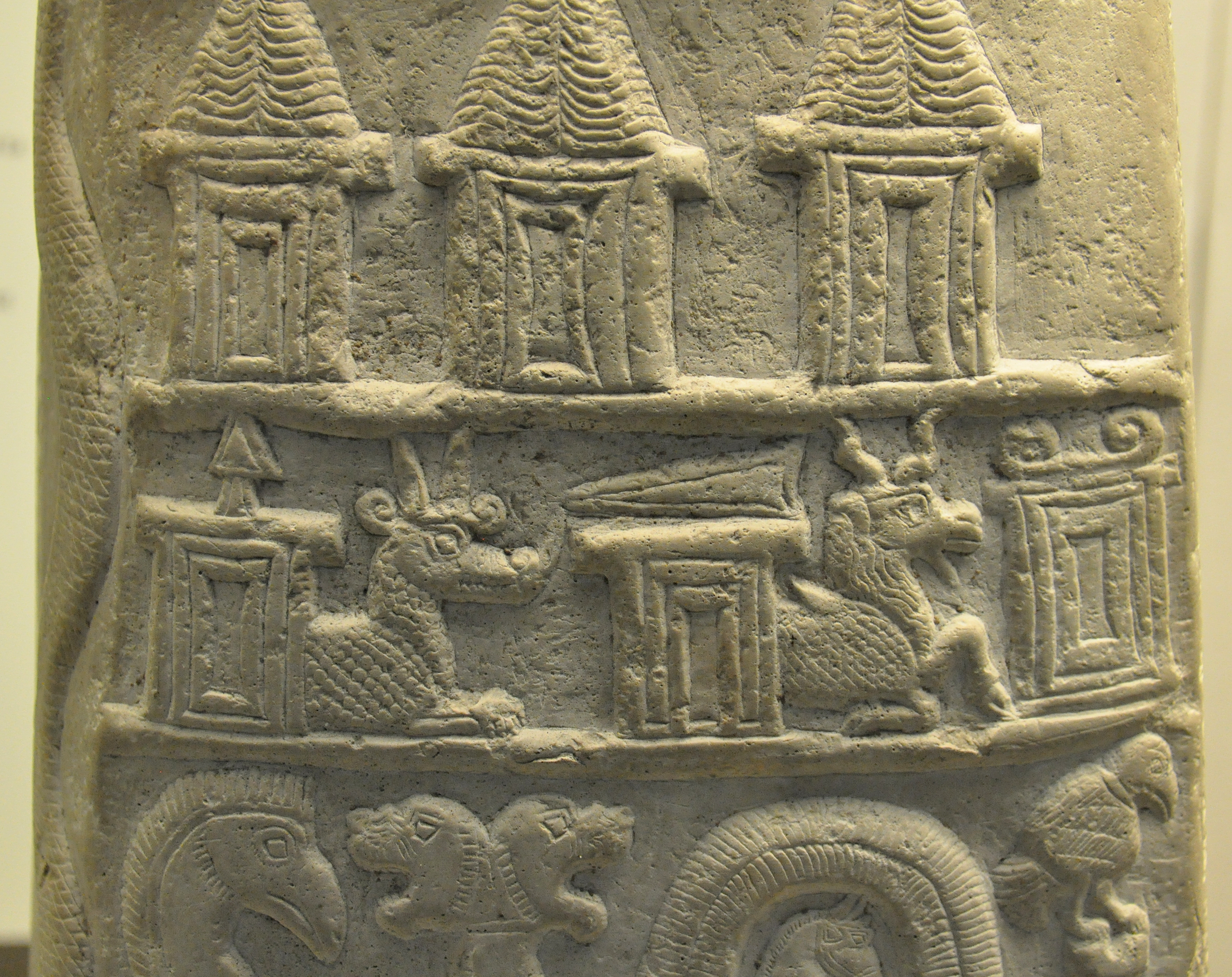
- Symbols of various deities, including Anu (rightmost, second row) on a kudurru of Ritti-Marduk, from Sippar, Iraq, 1125–1104 BCE
- Abode: Heaven
- Symbol: Horned crown on a pedestal
- Number: 60

Genealogy
- Parents: Anshar and Kishar; Alala and Belili
- Consort: Antu, Ki or Urash (equated with each other); Nammu (in a single inscription)
- Children: Enki, Ishkur, Lamashtu, Ninisina, Ninkarrak, Amurru, Gibil, Urash, Nisaba (sometimes), Enlil (sometimes), Inanna (sometimes)

Equivalents
- Greek: Zeus (disputed), Uranus
- Elamite: Jabru
- Hurrian: Hamurnu
- Persian: Ahura Mazda (disputed)

Anu (Akkadian: 𒀭𒀀𒉡 ANU, from 𒀭 an "Sky", "Heaven") or Anum, originally An (Sumerian: 𒀭 An), was the divine personification of the sky, king of the gods, and ancestor of many of the deities in ancient Mesopotamian religion. He was regarded as a source of both divine and human kingship, and opens the enumerations of deities in many Mesopotamian texts. At the same time, his role was largely passive, and he was not commonly worshipped. It is sometimes proposed that the Eanna temple located in Uruk originally belonged to him, rather than Inanna. While he is well attested as one of its divine inhabitants, there is no evidence that the main deity of the temple ever changed; Inanna was already associated with it in the earliest sources. After it declined, a new theological system developed in the same city under Seleucid rule, resulting in Anu being redefined as an active deity. As a result he was actively worshipped by inhabitants of the city in the final centuries of the history of ancient Mesopotamia.

Multiple traditions regarding the identity of Anu's spouse existed, though three of them—Ki, Urash, and Antu—were at various points in time equated with each other, and all three represented earth, similar to how he represented heaven. In a fourth tradition, more sparsely attested, his wife was the goddess Nammu instead. In addition to listing his spouses and children, god lists also often enumerated his various ancestors, such as Anshar or Alala. A variant of one such family tree formed the basis of the Enūma Eliš.

Anu briefly appears in the Akkadian Epic of Gilgamesh, in which his daughter Ishtar (the Akkadian counterpart of Inanna) persuades him to give her the Bull of Heaven so that she may send it to attack Gilgamesh. The incident results in the death of the Bull of Heaven and a leg being thrown at Ishtar's head. In another myth, Anu summons the mortal hero Adapa before him for breaking the wing of the south wind. Anu orders for Adapa to be given the food and water of immortality, which Adapa refuses, having been warned beforehand by Enki that Anu will offer him the food and water of death. In the Hurrian myths about Kumarbi, known chiefly from their Hittite translations, Anu is a former ruler of the gods, who was overthrown by Kumarbi, who bit off his genitals and gave birth to the weather god Teshub. It is possible that this narrative was later the inspiration for the castration of Ouranos in Hesiod's Theogony. It has also been proposed that in the Hellenistic period Anu might have been identified with Zeus, though this remains uncertain.

== Character ==
Anu was a divine representation of the sky, as indicated by his name, which simply means "sky" in Sumerian. In Akkadian, it was spelled as Anu, and was written either logographically (^{d}AN) or syllabically (^{d}a-nu(m)). In Sumerian texts, unlike the names of other deities, his was never prefaced by the dingir sign, referred to as the "divine determinative" in modern literature, since it would result in unnecessary repetition, as the same sign was also read as an. In addition to referring to sky and heaven and to Anu, the same sign could also be read as dingir or ilu, the generic term "god" in, respectively, Sumerian and Akkadian. As the number 60 was associated with him, the corresponding numeral could represent his name, and in esoteric texts by extension also the other readings of the sign DINGIR.

Anu was regarded as the supreme god, and the major god lists, such as An = Anum, place him on top of the pantheon. He could be described as the king of the gods, and was believed to be the source of all legitimate power, who bestowed the right to rule upon gods and kings alike. The highest god in the pantheon was said to possess the anûtu or anuti (^{d}a-nu-ti), which means "heavenly power" or more literally Anuship. In the Babylonian Enûma Eliš, the gods praise Marduk, shouting "Your word is Anu!"

Although Anu was a very important deity, his nature was often ambiguous and ill-defined. The number of myths focusing on him is small and he was only rarely actively worshiped. His position has therefore been described as that of a "figurehead" and "otiose deity" by Assyriologist Paul-Alain Beaulieu. Wilfred G. Lambert characterized his position as head of the pantheon as "always somewhat nominal" and noted that "Enlil in practice wielded greater power" according to the Mesopotamians. Beaulieu similarly states that functionally the active head god was Enlil and later Marduk in Babylonia and Ashur in Assyria, not Anu. Evidence from Lagash indicates that at least in the Early Dynastic period, during the reign of Eannatum and Entemena, it was Enlil, rather than Anu, who was the head of the pantheon of this city, though later offering lists provide evidence on the contrary, possibly indicating a change occurred during the reign of either the Sargonic dynasty or Gudea. Xianhua Wang points out that in the Early Dynastic period, the rulers who mention Anu in the inscriptions and refer to him as lugal kur-kur, "king of the lands," seem to be connected with either Ur or Uruk, while elsewhere the same epithet designates Enlil instead. A text known from copies from Shuruppak and Ebla only refers to Anu as the divine "king of Uruk." In later inscriptions from the period of the Old Babylonian Empire, Enlil could be mentioned both alongside Anu or on his own as the head of the pantheon. A trinity consisting of both of them and Ea is also attested. Only in Uruk in the final centuries of the first millennium BCE a change occurred, and Anu was reinvented by theologians as an active god.

=== Astral role ===
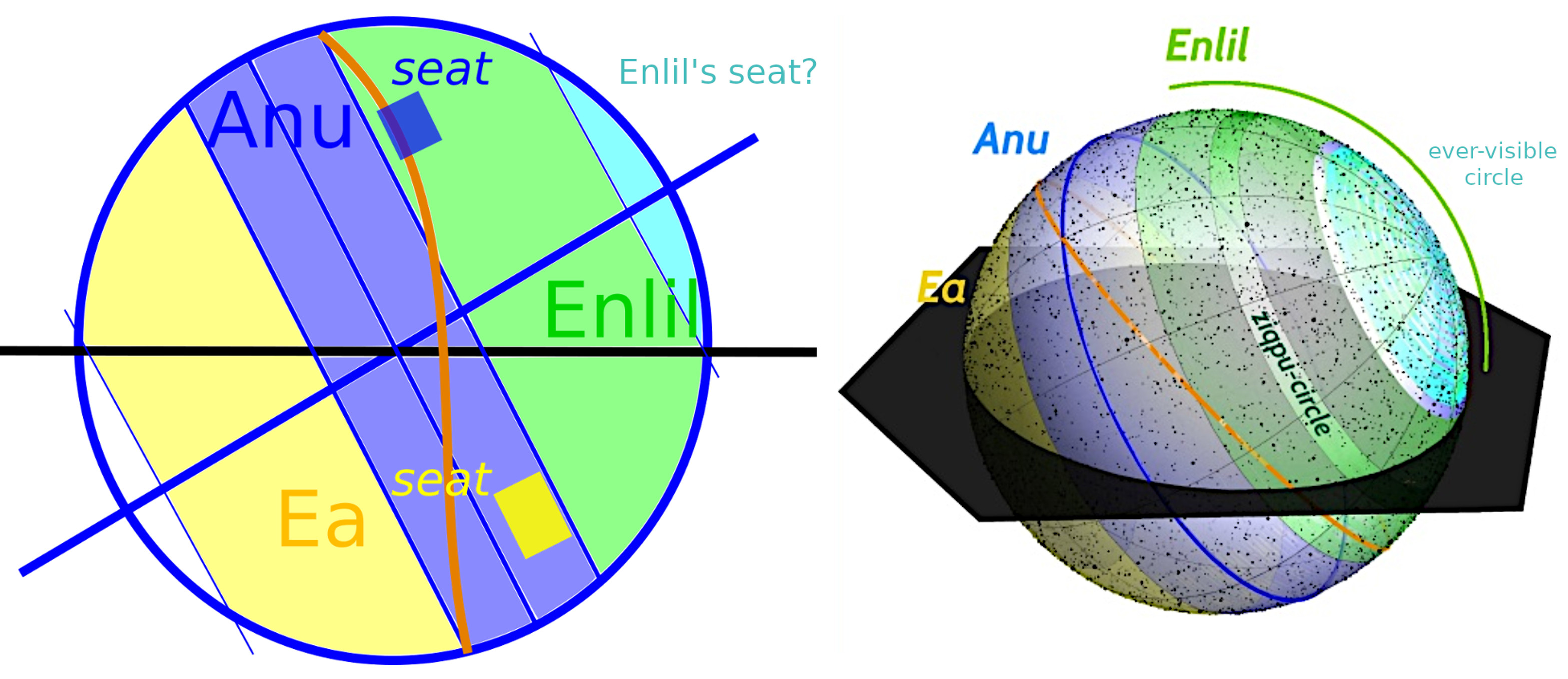
The Babylonian globe (no matter whether or not it existed physically) would have been divided in three paths of the gods Ea (south), Anu (±17° around the equator) and Enlil (northern cap, all declinations >17°). These three gods have their "seats" among the stars, represented by the constellations Cancer and Iku (Pegasus).

In Mesopotamian astronomy, the sky was divided into three zones, with the stars closest to the pole belonging to Enlil and those close to the equator to Ea. The stars located between these two zones were the domain of Anu. All three were referred to as the "Ways" of the respective deities. Astronomer John G. Rogers assumes that the boundaries of each Way were at 17°N and 17°S. The division is best attested in the astronomical treatise MUL.APIN. The date of its composition is unknown, though it is known that it is more recent than the Old Babylonian period, and the oldest reference to the tripartite division of the sky comes from a document from the thirteenth century BCE, a version of the so-called Prayer to the Gods of the Night, whose oldest copies do not mention this concept yet.

In Seleucid Uruk, Anu's astral role was extended further, and in a text composed in year 71 of the Seleucid era (216/215 BCE) he is described as responsible for the entire firmament. Furthermore, two circumpolar stars started to be called the "Great Anu and Antu of Heaven," and received offerings as if they were deities. They typically appear alongside the other seven major celestial bodies which were known to Mesopotamian astronomers in the late first millennium BCE: the sun, the moon, and the planets Nebēru (Jupiter), Dilbat (Venus), Šiḫṭu (Mercury), Kayamānu (Saturn), and Ṣalbatānu (Mars).

=== Iconography ===
Anu almost never appears in Mesopotamian artwork and has no known recognizable anthropomorphic iconography. References to him holding typical symbols of divine kingship, such as a scepter and a ring-shaped object, are known from textual sources.

A text from the Kassite period explains that Anu's symbol was a horned crown on a pedestal. It is attested on some kudurru (boundary stones), where it is typically present in the upper half of the decoration, below the symbols of Ishtar, Shamash and Sin, who were depicted on the very top of such monuments due to representing celestial bodies. Anu was also depicted in the form of a horned crown in Neo-Assyrian reliefs. According to Andrew R. George, references to the "seat" of a deity known from various topographical texts from both Babylonia and Assyria likely also refer to a representation in the form of an emblem placed on a pedestal. It has been pointed out that Anu's symbolic depictions were identical to Enlil's. A similar symbol could also represent Assur in the Neo-Assyrian period. All three of these gods could be depicted in this form in the same reliefs.

== Associations with other deities ==
=== Spouses ===
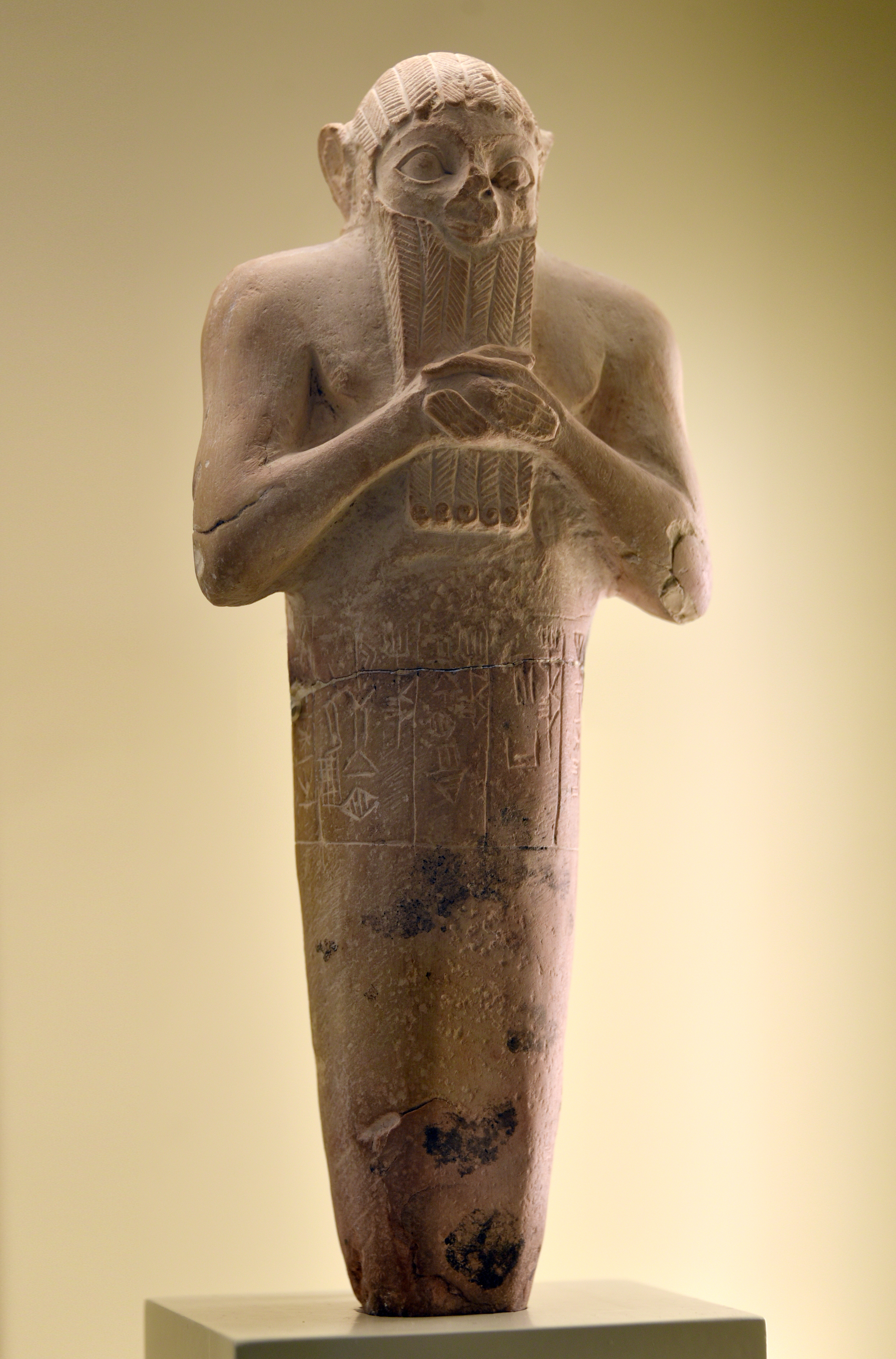
A foundation figurine of king Lugal-kisalsi. The inscription mentions Nammu and Anu as wife and husband.

Ki, "earth," is well attested as Anu's spouse. Her name was commonly written without a divine determinative, and she was usually not regarded as a personified goddess. Another of Anu's spouses was Urash. According to Frans Wiggermann, she is his most commonly attested wife. She is well attested starting with the Sargonic period and continues to appear as a wife of Anu often until the Old Babylonian period. A different, male, deity named Urash served as the tutelary god of Dilbat. Wiggermann proposes that while Ki, as generally agreed, represented earth as a cosmogonic element, Urash was a divine representation of arable land. He suggests translating her name as "tilth," though its etymology and meaning continue to be a matter of debate. A single Neo-Assyrian god list known from three copies appears to combine Ki and Urash into a single deity, ^{d}ki-uraš. An early incorrect reading of this entry was ^{d}ki-ib, which early Assyriologist Daniel David Luckenbill assumed to be a reference to the Egyptian god Geb, an identification now regarded as impossible.

The goddess Antu is also attested as a wife of Anu. Her name is etymologically an Akkadian feminine form of Anu. The god list An = Anum equates her with Ki, while a lexical text from the Old Babylonian period – with Urash. There is evidence that like the latter, she could be considered a goddess associated with the earth. She is already attested in the third millennium BCE, possibly as early as in the Early Dynastic period in a god list from Abu Salabikh, though no references to her are known from Uruk from before the first millennium BCE, and even in the Neo-Babylonian period she only appears in a single letter. However, she is attested as Anu's wife in documents from the Seleucid period from this city, and at that point in time became its lead goddess alongside her husband.

An inscription on a votive figurine of king Lugal-kisalsi (or Lugal-giparesi), who ruled over Uruk and Ur in the twenty-fourth century BCE, refers to Nammu as the wife of Anu. Julia Krul proposes that this was a traditional pairing in Early Dynastic Uruk, but according to Frans Wiggermann no other direct references to Nammu as Anu's wife are known. A possible exception is an Old Babylonian incantation which might refer to her as "pure one of An," but this attestation is uncertain.

In older literature, an epithet of Ashratum was often translated as "bride of An," but this is now considered to be a mistake. The Sumerian term used in it, é-gi_{4}-a, equivalent of Akkadian kallatum, meant both "daughter-in-law" and "bride," but the latter meaning relied on the social practice of fathers picking the brides of their sons. As an epithet of goddesses, it denotes their status as a daughter-in-law of a specific deity. For example, Aya was often called kallatum due to her position as the daughter-in-law of Sin and wife of his son Shamash.

A goddess named Ninursala is described as Anu's dam-bànda, possibly to be translated as "concubine," in the god list An = Anum. According to Antoine Cavigneaux and Manfred Krebernik, she is also attested in an Old Babylonian god list from Mari.

=== Children ===
Many deities were regarded as Anu's descendants, and he could be called "the father of the great gods." It has been argued that Anu's primary role in the Sumerian pantheon was as an ancestor figure, and that the term Anunna (also Anunnaki, Anunna-anna), which referred to various Mesopotamian deities collectively, means "offspring of Anu" and designates specific gods as particularly prominent.

Ishkur (Adad), the weather god, was consistently regarded as a son of Anu. While some literary texts may refer to Enlil as his father instead, this view was less common and is no longer attested in any sources later than the Old Babylonian period. The only source to directly name his mother places Urash in this role. Another god frequently regarded as Anu's son was Enki. Nammu was the mother of Enki in the local tradition of Eridu and in the myth Enki and Ninmah, but a hymn from the reign of Ishme-Dagan confirms that a tradition in which his mother was Urash instead also existed. In texts dedicated to Ishkur, he and Enki could be referred to as twins, but no analogous epithet can be found in compositions which focus on the latter god, according to Daniel Schwmer because due to his higher rank in the pantheon he would not benefit from being called the brother of a comparatively lower ranked deity.

Enlil could be called a son of Anu, as already attested in an inscription of Lugalzagesi. Xianhua Wang proposes that this development was meant to reconcile a northern tradition, in which the king of the gods was Enlil, with a southern one, where the same role was played by Anu, though even in the south Lagash seemingly belonged to this proposed Enlil tradition. Another source which presents Enlil as Anu's son is the myth Enki and the World Order, which also specifies that he was the older brother of Enki. However, Enlil's parentage was variable. The tradition in which his ancestors were the so-called Enki-Ninki deities is now considered conventional by Assyriologists, though materials pertaining to it are difficult to interpret. Enki, the ancestor of Enlil, is not to be confused with the god Enki, as indicated by the different spelling of their names in cuneiform. In yet another tradition, Enlil's father was Lugaldukuga, but the texts placing him in this role are relatively late. It is first attested in the god list An = Anum, most likely composed in the Kassite period.

Amurru (Martu) was universally regarded as a son of Anu. Dietz Otto Edzard argued that the fact he was not regarded as a son of Enlil instead might stem from his secondary role in Mesopotamian religion. It is also possible that the comparisons between him and Ishkur contributed to the development of this genealogy. It has additionally been argued that a variant writing of Amurru's name, AN.^{d}MARTU (AN.AN.MAR.TU) represents a conjoined deity consisting of Amurru and Anu. However, according to Paul-Alain Beaulieu it most likely should simply be read as the Akkadian phrase ^{d}Il Amurrim, "the god of Amurru," as indicated by a Hurrian translation known from a bilingual text from Emar, ^{d}e-ni a-mu-ri-we, which has the same meaning.

Texts from the reign of Rim-Sîn I and Samsu-iluna identify the love goddess Nanaya as a daughter of Anu. This notion is also present in an inscription of Esarhaddon. Paul-Alain Beaulieu speculates that Nanaya developed in the context of a local theological system in which Anu and Inanna were viewed as a couple, and that she was initially regarded as their daughter. However, as noted by Olga Drewnowska-Rymarz, direct references to Nanaya as the daughter of Inanna are not common, and it is possible this epithet was not treated literally, but rather as an indication of closeness between them. Furthermore, Nanaya could also be regarded as a daughter of the male Urash, and was sometimes specifically called his firstborn daughter.

In late sources, Nisaba could be called a daughter of Anu. However, as noted by Wilfred G. Lambert at least one text "seems to imply a desire not to have Anu as Nisaba's father," and instead makes her the daughter of Irḫan, in this context identified with Ea and understood as a cosmic river, "father of the gods of the universe."

While Inanna (Ishtar) could be regarded as the daughter of Anu and Antu, the view that she was a daughter of Nanna and Ningal is agreed to be the most commonly attested tradition regarding her parentage. While the "Standard Babylonian" version of the Epic of Gilgamesh, an astronomical text and the Hymn to the Queen of Nippur refer to her directly as Anu's daughter, according to Paul-Alain Beaulieu it is not impossible that these statements do not reflect parentage but merely indirect descent, with an implied genealogy in which Anu was the father of Enlil, grandfather of Nanna and great-grandfather of Inanna. Furthermore, the hymn in mention also addresses her as a daughter of the moon god.

Ishtaran was at least sometimes described as a son of Anu and Urash, and as a result the Old Babylonian Nippur god list associates him with Uruk. He also could be referred to as Anu Rabu (AN.GAL), "the great Anu," but Wouter Henkelman proposes this epithet is instead a sign that a connection existed between him and the Elamite god Napirisha, whose name was written with the same combination of cuneiform signs. It is possible that in the late first millennium BCE attempts at syncretizing Ishtaran and Anu were made during a period of cooperation between the theologians from Uruk, Nippur and Der, but direct evidence is presently lacking.

Further deities attested as children of Anu include the medicine goddesses Ninisina and Ninkarrak (also directly identified as daughters of his wife Urash), Bau (who could be called his firstborn daughter), the weaver goddess Uttu (in a single source), the messenger god Papsukkal, Geshtinanna (in a hymn of Shulgi, which also mentions Urash as her mother), the fire god Gibil (and through association with him also Nuska), Šiḫṭu, the divine representation of the planet Mercury (in Seleucid Uruk), and possibly the male Urash. Whether Anu was the father of Shara in the tradition of his cult center, Umma, cannot be determined with a certainty, as the most direct reference, the phrase aia DINGIR ù-TU-zu in a hymn, has two possible translations: "your father An who engendered you," or "your divine father who engendered you." Additionally, some references to Anu as the father of a specific deity might be metaphorical or indirect, as in the case of Nanna (typically a son of Enlil and Ninlil) or Nungal.

Anu could also be regarded as the father of various demons. Lamashtu, a goddess associated with death and disease of children, was his daughter, and was frequently called Daughter-of-Anu (mārat Anu). A group of seven, eight or nine Asakku demons called "the sons of Anu" is also known. In a text referred to as the Nippur Compendium by modern researchers, Latarak is identified both as an Asakku and as a son of Anu. The Epic of Erra describes the Sebitti as his creations, subsequently given to the eponymous god as weapons.

=== Ancestors ===
The earliest texts do not discuss Anu's origin, and his preeminence is simply assumed. In later traditions, his father was usually Anshar, whose spouse was Kishar. Another tradition most likely regarded Alala and Belili as his parents. A larger group of his ancestors, arranged into multiple generations, is known from mythological and scholarly sources. Wilfred G. Lambert coined the term "Theogony of Anu" to refer to arrangements of these deities collectively. At least five versions are known from incantations, though in three out of five the first pair are Duri and Dari, and the last – Alala and Belili. A slightly different version is known from the god list An = Anum, though there are differences between individual copies as well. Lambert proposes that initially at least two different traditions existed, but they were later combined into a list patterned on those associated with Enlil. At least in some cases, long lists of divine ancestors were meant to help avoid the implications of divine incest, which were hard to reconcile with strong incest taboos attested from various periods of Mesopotamian history.

Duri and Dari likely represented time understood as a primary force in creation, and their names are derived from an Akkadian phrase meaning "ever and ever." The pairing of Alala and Belili was most likely based entirely on both of their names being iterative, and elsewhere they occur in unrelated roles independently from each other. Further attested pairs of deities regarded as ancestors of Anu include Egur and Gara, whose character is unknown, Lahmu and Lahamu, derived from the name of a type of aquatic mythical creature, two deities whose names were written logographically as ^{d}ALAM possibly representing another of the known pairs or associated with the underworld, and Enurulla and Ninurulla, the "lord" and "lady" of the "primeval city," whose inclusion in Anu's family tree most likely reflected "the importance of the city in ancient Mesopotamian thought." The genealogy of gods presented in the Enūma Eliš is a derivative of the lists of Anu's ancestors from earlier sources. The pairs listed in this composition are Apsu and Tiamat, Lahmu and Lahamu, and Anshar and Kishar. The first of them is not attested in any earlier sources.

The god list An = Anum refers to Nammu as the "mother who gave birth to Heaven and Earth," ^{d}ama-tu-an-ki, but as noted by Frans Wiggermann, the terms an and ki were most likely understood collectively in this case. A similar reference is known from an exorcism formula assumed to predate the Middle Babylonian period. There is no indication that this act of creation involved a second deity acting as Nammu's spouse. She appears in a variant of Anu's genealogy in An = Anum, though as remarked by Lambert, she was "pushed out (...) into a kind of appendix." Due to the sparse attestations of Nammu it is assumed today that she "was not generally acknowledged outside Eridu."

A single prayer to Papsukkal might allude to a tradition in which Anu was a son of Enmesharra. In another text, Anu and Enlil receive their positions from this deity, not necessarily peacefully.

Due to his connection with various ancestral deities, Anu could be occasionally associated with the underworld. One Assyrian explanatory text mentions Antu making funerary offerings for him. However, according to Julia Krul, it is impossible to tell how widespread the recognition of this aspect of his character was, and broad statements about Anu being outright identified with deities of the underworld in the theology of Seleucid Uruk should be generally avoided.

==== In Hurrian tradition ====
While it is often assumed that Hurrian Alalu was the father of Anu, similar to his Mesopotamian counterpart Alala, and that Kumarbi was in turn viewed as Anu's son, it has also been argued that two separate lineages of gods appear in the prologue of the Kumarbi myth, and therefore that Alalu and Anu should not be regarded as father and son in Hurrian sources. Kumarbi is directly referred to as Alalu's "seed" in the Song of Kummarbi. He also addresses himself as "Alalu's son" in another myth belonging to the same cycle, Song of Ḫedammu. The order of deities in international treaties also supports the notion that Alalu and Kumarbi belong to the same line, but Anu does not. Hittitologist Gary Beckman notes that the two lines were seemingly only united with the birth of the new generation of gods (Teshub, Tashmishu and others), a result of Kumarbi's castration of Anu, which resulted in a "burden," Anu's seed, being placed inside him. The process is poetically compared to production of bronze from tin and copper.

=== Attendants ===
Ninshubur, the "archetypal vizier of the gods," was primarily associated with Inanna, but she could also be described as the sukkal (divine vizier, attendant deity) of Anu. The association between her and Anu is attested from the reign of Third Dynasty of Ur onward. Her role as a popular intercessory deity in Sumerian religion was derived from her position as a servant of major deities, which resulted in the belief that she was capable of mediating with her masters, both with Inanna and with Anu, on behalf of human petitioners. Another deity who could be placed in the same role was Ilabrat. In texts from the second millennium BCE, Ninshubur and Ilabrat coexisted and in at least some cases Ninshubur's name, treated as masculine, was a logographic spelling of Ilabrat's, for example in Mari in personal names. It has been proposed that the variance in Ninshubur's gender is related to syncretism with him. The goddess Amasagnudi could be regarded as Anu's sukkal too, as attested in a single Old Babylonian lexical text. Kakka is also attested in this role in a few cases, though in the Enūma Eliš he is the sukkal of Anshar instead.

In later periods, other sukkals of Anu were eclipsed by Papsukkal, originally associated with the god Zababa, whose rise was likely rooted simply in the presence of the word sukkal in his name. In the context of the so-called "antiquarian theology" relying largely on god lists, which developed in Uruk under Achaemenid and Seleucid rule, he was fully identified with Ninshubur and thus became Anu's sukkal and one of the eighteen major deities of the city. He was not worshiped in this city earlier.

=== Foreign equivalents ===
According to a Šurpu commentary, Anu's Elamite counterpart was Jabru. However, according to the god list An = Anum, a god bearing the name Yabnu (^{d}ia-ab-na) was the "Enlil of Elam." Wilfred G. Lambert concluded that Jabru and Yabnu should be considered two spellings of the same name. While Jabru is described as an Elamite god in Mesopotamian sources, no known Elamite texts mention him.

In the god list Anšar = Anum, one of the names of Anu is Hamurnu, derived from the Hurrian word referring to heaven. However, while Hurrians did worship earth and heaven, they did not regard them as personified deities. Furthermore, Anu appears under his own name in Hurrian mythology.

While Robert Monti argues that the Canaanites seem to have ascribed Anu's attributes to El, no equivalents of Anu were actually present in the pantheons of various ancient Syrian states. Both the head of the hinterland pantheon, Dagan, and the head of the coastal pantheon, El, were regarded as analogous to Enlil, rather than Anu. Monti additionally describes a god he refers to as "Shamem" as the most direct equivalent to Anu in the Canaanite pantheon and as a personification of the sky, but this name was a title of the weather god Baal which developed into a separate deity, Baalshamin, and Aramaic texts indicate that he was viewed as an equivalent of Hadad, rather than Anu, further east.

It is sometimes proposed that in the Hellenistic period Anu was identified with the Greek god Zeus, but most Assyriologists consider this possibility to be uncertain, one exception being Eleanor Robson. Julia Krul points out authors who propose it do not clarify whether they mean if "the Seleucids made such an equation themselves (...), or that the Urukean priest-scholars convinced their new kings of the similarity between the two gods (...), or even that they genuinely believed that Anu and Zeus were the same." No direct evidence of any of these possibilities is available. According to Walter Burkert, a researcher of ancient Greek religion, direct literary parallels exist between Anu and the Zeus. According to him, the scene from Tablet VI of the Epic of Gilgamesh in which Ishtar comes before Anu after being rejected by Gilgamesh and complains to her mother Antu, but is mildly rebuked by Anu, is directly paralleled by a scene from Book V of the Iliad. In this scene, Aphrodite, who Burkert regards as the later Greek development of Ishtar, is wounded by the Greek hero Diomedes while trying to save her son Aeneas. She flees to Mount Olympus, where she cries to her mother Dione, is mocked by her sister Athena, and is mildly rebuked by her father Zeus. Not only is the narrative parallel significant, but so is the fact that Dione's name is a feminization of Zeus's own, just as Antu is a feminine form of Anu. Dione does not appear throughout the rest of the Iliad, in which Zeus's consort is instead the goddess Hera. Burkert therefore concludes that Dione is clearly a calque of Antu.

An equivalence between Anu and Ahura Mazda has been proposed based on the assumption that non-Persian subjects of the Achaemenid Empire might have viewed the latter simply as a sky god.

== Worship ==
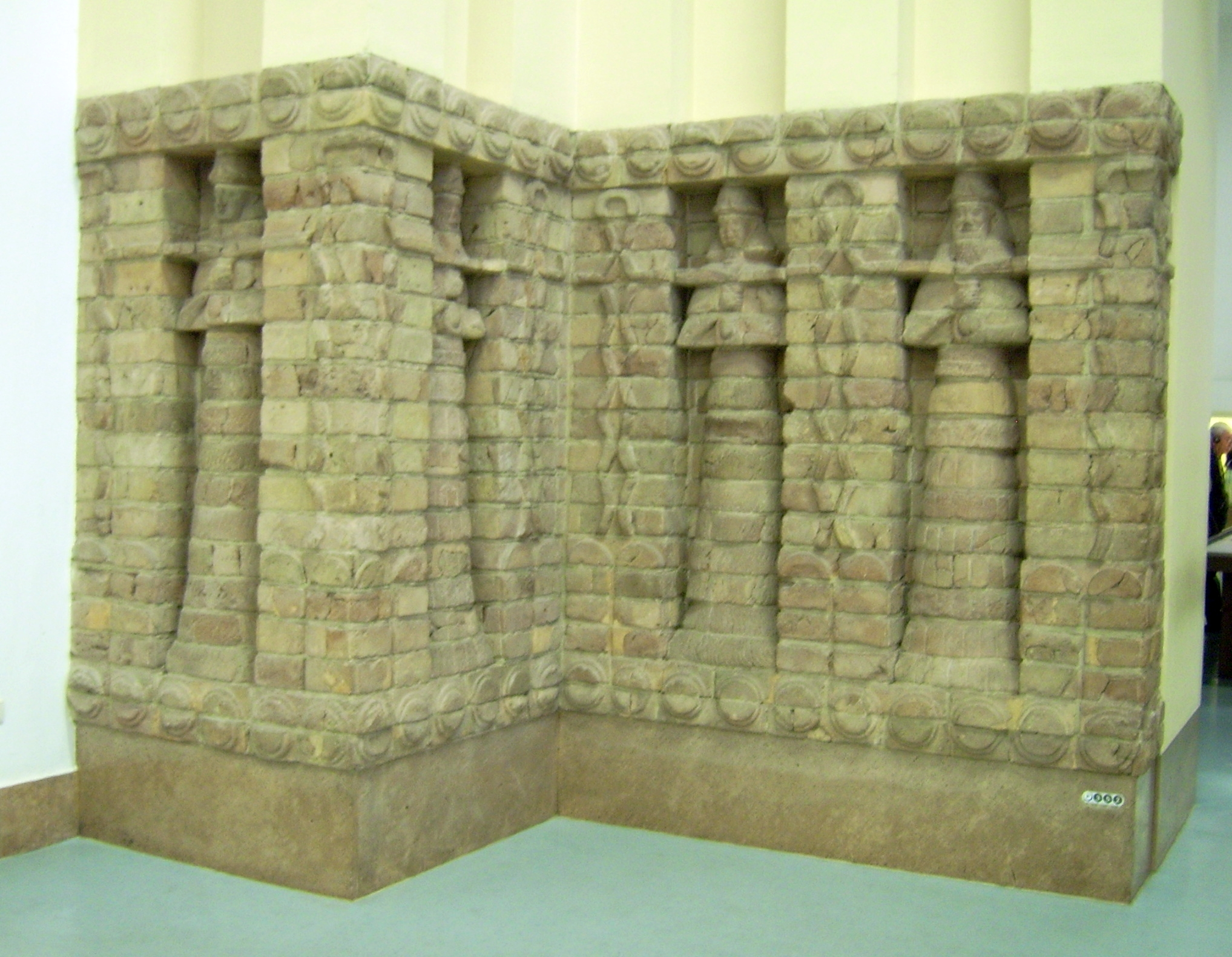
Part of the front of a Babylonian temple to Ishtar in Uruk, built c. 1415 BCE, during the Kassite Period (c. 1600—1155 BCE). It has been argued in the past that it was first dedicated to Anu, and only later to Inanna, but this view is no longer regarded as plausible.

Anu was chiefly associated with the city of Uruk, where he was one of the major deities next to Inanna (Ishtar) and Nanaya, but before the end of the Neo-Babylonian period his cult had a narrower scope than theirs. It is often assumed that the so-called "White Temple," which dates back to the Uruk IV period (3500–3100 BCE) was his original cult center, and it is even sometimes referred to as the "Anu ziggurat" in modern literature. However, there is no evidence that Anu was actually worshipped in this structure. His presence in the oldest texts remains a matter of debate, as it is uncertain if the cuneiform sign DINGIR present in them does not necessarily denote a specific god. Paul-Alain Beaulieu concludes that whether he appears in these sources is unprovable.

There is also no indication that Eanna, "House of Heaven" (Sumerian: e_{2}-anna; Cuneiform: 𒂍𒀭 E_{2}.AN (Note: é-an-na means "sanctuary" ("house" + "Heaven" ["An"] + genitive))), the main temple of Uruk in historical times, was originally the abode of Anu alone, as sometimes proposed in the past. It was already associated with Inanna in the fourth millennium BCE, and her role as the tutelary goddess of Uruk most likely dates at least to this period as well. Julia Krul proposes that even if Anu was already worshiped in the Uruk period, he likely had to share the Eanna temple with Inanna. The oldest texts do not mention the Eanna yet, and it is not certain if a sanctuary most likely called "Ean" attested in them was a temple of Anu and if it corresponded to any later structure. Through the Early Dynastic, Sargonic and Ur III periods, Inanna was the main deity of the city, and Eanna was regarded as her temple first and foremost. The Bassetki inscription of Naram-Sin in particular supports the view that Inanna was the goddess of Uruk and that she was perceived as more significant than Anu. No references to Anu are known from inscriptions of the Ur III rulers mentioning the Eanna, even though he does appear in offering lists. However, royal inscriptions from the Old Babylonian period indicate that Anu was believed to dwell in the Eanna. In the Old Babylonian version of the Epic of Gilgamesh, Eanna is described only as the dwelling of Anu, but the later "Standard Babylonian" version associates it both with Ishtar and Anu. It has been proposed that similar to the Bull of Heaven episode, the former tradition might simply indicate the existence of anti-Ishtar sentiment among compilers of this work. Simultaneously Anu does not play any major role and Inanna is the sole owner of Eanna in the myths about Enmerkar and Lugalbanda, other legendary kings of Uruk commonly referenced in Mesopotamian literature. A mythological tradition in which the Eanna originally belonged to Anu, but was later usurped by Inanna is known from multiple literary compositions, but it might have only been a founding myth explaining how the first temples were established.

Starting in the Ur III period, Anu came to be seen as a member of a triad of foremost deities invoked in royal inscriptions, which also included Enlil and Enki. A seat, known as Barakiskilla ("dais, pure place") and a garden dedicated to him are mentioned in documents from the reign of Ur-Nammu. Their location is uncertain, but Andrew R. George tentatively proposes Ur. In the following Isin-Larsa period, kings of Isin made no reference to Anu in their year formulas. Rim-Sîn I of Larsa revived the tradition and invoked the traditional triad in them, possibly to show that he planned to control all of southern Babylonia. It has been also suggested that one of his predecessors, Gungunum, invoked Anu, Enlil and Nanna as a similar trinity in his inscriptions to show he was in control of their major cult centers. After conquering Rim-Sin I's kingdom, Hammurabi of Babylon started to invoke Anu and Enlil, though not Ea, in his own formulas. Similar evidence is not available from the reign of Samsu-iluna, who only invoked Anu and Enlil in a single inscription most likely pertaining to the reconquest of southern cities. Later kings of the same dynasty only infrequently mentioned the pair, most likely as a part of ceremonial formulas meant to tie their reigns to a longer tradition.

In Assyria, Anu appears for the first time in an inscription of Shamshi-Adad I, who described him as one of the gods who bestowed kingship upon him. A temple of Adad which he built in Assur later came to be dedicated to both the weather god and Anu. It was accompanied by a ziggurat, Emelamanna ("house of the radiance of heaven"). Daniel Schwemer suggests that the pairing of those two gods was based on the common view that they were father and son.

No direct references to the worship of Anu are known from the part of the Old Babylonian period during which the cults of Uruk were temporarily relocated to Kish in the north of Babylonia. A possible exception is a deity or deities designated by the logogram AN.^{d}INANNA. However, it has also been proposed that it represents not Anu and Inanna as a pair, as commonly assumed, but a specific manifestation of Inanna, Urkitum. Presently there is no agreement regarding this problem in scholarship and which deity or deities it refers to remains uncertain.

In documents from the reign of the First Sealand dynasty, the dyad of Enlil and Ea (Enki) replaced the triad containing Anu. The only god list known from the Sealand archives does not mention Anu at all, and simply begins with Enlil. He is nonetheless attested in a few offering lists. Furthermore, it is possible the name of the king Akurduana might be theophoric and should be translated as "raging flood of Anu," though this remains uncertain and the ordinary word "heaven" might be the correct translation of the sign AN in this case instead.

The so-called Babylonian Temple List most likely composed in the first millennium BCE mentions no temples of Anu, though with the exception of Larsa, Ur and Eridu the southernmost cities are generally poorly represented in it. A single liturgical text indicates that a temple of Anu called Ekinamma possibly existed in Kesh. The hymn BRM IV 8 lists ten names of temples associated with him, including the Eanki and the Egalankia, possibly located in Uruk.

In the Neo-Babylonian period, Anu only had a small sanctuary in Uruk. He has been described as a comparatively minor deity in the religious practice of this period. While multiple Neo-Babylonian archives from Uruk have been excavated and published, so far research revealed only a small number of people bearing theophoric names invoking Anu before the reign of Nabonidus, with a total of five being mentioned in known documents according to the highest estimate. The most historically notable example is Anu-aḫu-iddin, who was the governor of Uruk during the reign of Nabopolassar. The number of such names started to rise during the reign of Nabonidus. Documents from the reign of Darius I show further growth, though names invoking chiefly northern Babylonian deities, as well as Nanaya, Ishtar and Shamash (from Larsa) remain numerous. It has been proposed that the changed in favor of Anu accelerated during the reign of Xerxes I. After a rebellion of the northern Babylonian cities against Persian rule in 484 BCE, this king seemingly reorganized the traditional structure of Mesopotamian clergy, and while Uruk did not rebel, it was not exempt from changes. It has been proposed that the older priests, who were often connected to the northern cities and were predominantly involved in the cult of Ishtar, were replaced by a number of powerful local families dedicated to Anu. Julia Krul suggests that their members likely planned to expand the scope of Anu's cult in the Neo-Babylonian period already, but were unable to do so due to the interests of the kings, who favored Marduk as the head of the pantheon.

=== Theological reforms in Achaemenid and Seleucid Uruk ===
Xerxes' retaliation against the clergy of Uruk resulted in the collapse of Eanna as the center of Uruk's religious life and economy, and made the creation of a new system centered on the worship of Anu and his spouse Antu, rather than Ishtar and Nanaya, possible. The details of its early development are not well understood, as Mesopotamian texts from the later years of Achaemenid rule pertaining to temple administration and other religious affairs are scarce. The city as a whole did not decline, and it served various administrative and military purposes, as attested for example in documents from the reign of Darius II. It has even been described as the biggest and most prosperous city in Mesopotamia in the final centuries of the first millennium BCE. It is assumed that Anu's ascent to the top of the official pantheon was complete by the year 420 BCE. In theophoric names, he already predominates in economic documents from the reigns of Artaxerxes I and Darius II. In sources from the following Seleucid period, the cult of Anu appears to be flourishing. A new temple, dedicated jointly to him and Antu, the Bīt Rēš (head temple) was constructed at some point and became the new center of the city s religious life. Oldest dated attestation of this structure comes from a text which was apparently originally compiled during "the reign of Seleukos and Antiochos," presumably either Seleucus I Nicator and Antiochus I Soter (292/1 – 281/0 BCE) or of Antiochus I and his son Seleucus (280/79 – 267/6 BCE). The Bīt Rēš complex also included a new ziggurat, the Ešarra (Sumerian: "house of the universe"), the biggest such structure known from Mesopotamia and second biggest overall after the Elamite complex at Chogha Zanbil. Its name was likely borrowed from a similar structure in Nippur dedicated to Enlil.

Multiple explanations have been proposed for the elevation of Anu, though they must remain speculative due to lack of direct evidence. It has been argued that it was modeled on the position of Ahura Mazda in religion of the Achaemenids, but Paul-Alain Beaulieu points out that since first signs of it are already visible under Nabonidus, it is implausible that it was patterned on Persian religion. At the same time, he considers it possible that Achaemenid administration encouraged the worship of Anu, viewing it as a way to limit the influence of Babylon and its elites on inhabitants of other Mesopotamian cities. Similar connection has been proposed in the case of Anu and Zeus but also remains uncertain. Beaulieu instead proposes that Anu's rise was in part inspired by a network of syncretism associations between him, Anshar, who was also worshiped in Uruk, and the Assyrian head god Ashur, who in Assyria could be identified with the latter. However, Julia Krul points out there is no certainty that Anshar was actually understood as Ashur in Uruk, let alone that he was regarded as a form of Anu by local clergy. Beaulieu himself admits that most of the evidence which might support his theory might instead simply indicate that both the elevation of Assur and Anu relied on similar preexisting models, such as the theology centered on Enlil. Since during the Neo-Babylonian period Uruk was forced to accept the theology of Babylon, it is also possible that the elevation of Anu was seen as a manifestation of local identity. At the same time, it is not impossible that the new centralized Anu cult was patterned on the Babylonian theology and even a number of festivals and rituals of Anu might have been patterned after those of Marduk. Instances of rewriting compositions dedicated to Marduk or Enlil to suit the new Anu cult are known too. A resource commonly employed by the theologians and antiquarians working on the elevation of Anu were god lists, such as An = Anum, which provided the evidence needed to justify both this change and other examples of restructuring the city pantheon. Most likely the growing interest in astronomy and astrology among the clergy also played a role.

=== Uruk in late Seleucid and Parthian periods ===
While it is assumed that religious activity in Uruk continued through the late Seleucid and early Parthian periods, a large part of the Bīt Rēš complex was eventually destroyed by a fire. It was rebuilt as a fortress, and while a small temple was built next to it in the Parthian period, most likely Mesopotamian deities were no longer worshipped there. According to a Greek inscription dated to 111 CE, the deity worshipped in Uruk in the early first millennium was apparently otherwise unknown Gareus, whose temple was built during the reign of Vologases I of Parthia in a foreign style resembling Roman buildings. The final cuneiform text from the site is an astronomical tablet dated to 79 or 80 CE, possibly the last cuneiform text written in antiquity. It is assumed that the last remnants of the local religion and culture of Uruk disappeared by the time of the Sasanian conquest of Mesopotamia, even though the worship of individual deities might have outlasted cuneiform writing.

== Mythology ==
=== Sumerian ===
==== Sumerian creation myths ====
The main source of information about Sumerian creation mythology is the prologue to the epic poem Gilgamesh, Enkidu, and the Netherworld, which briefly describes the process of creation: at first, there is only Nammu, the primeval sea. Then, Nammu gives birth to An (the Sumerian name for Anu), the sky, and Ki, the earth. An and Ki mate with each other, causing Ki to give birth to Enlil, the god of the wind. Enlil separates An from Ki and carries off the earth as his domain, while An carries off the sky.

In Sumerian, the designation "An" was used interchangeably with "the heavens" so that in some cases it is doubtful whether, under the term, the god An or the heavens is being denoted. In Sumerian cosmogony, heaven was envisioned as a series of three domes covering the flat earth; each of these domes of heaven was believed to be made of a different precious stone. An was believed to be the highest and outermost of these domes, which was thought to be made of reddish stone.

==== Inanna myths ====
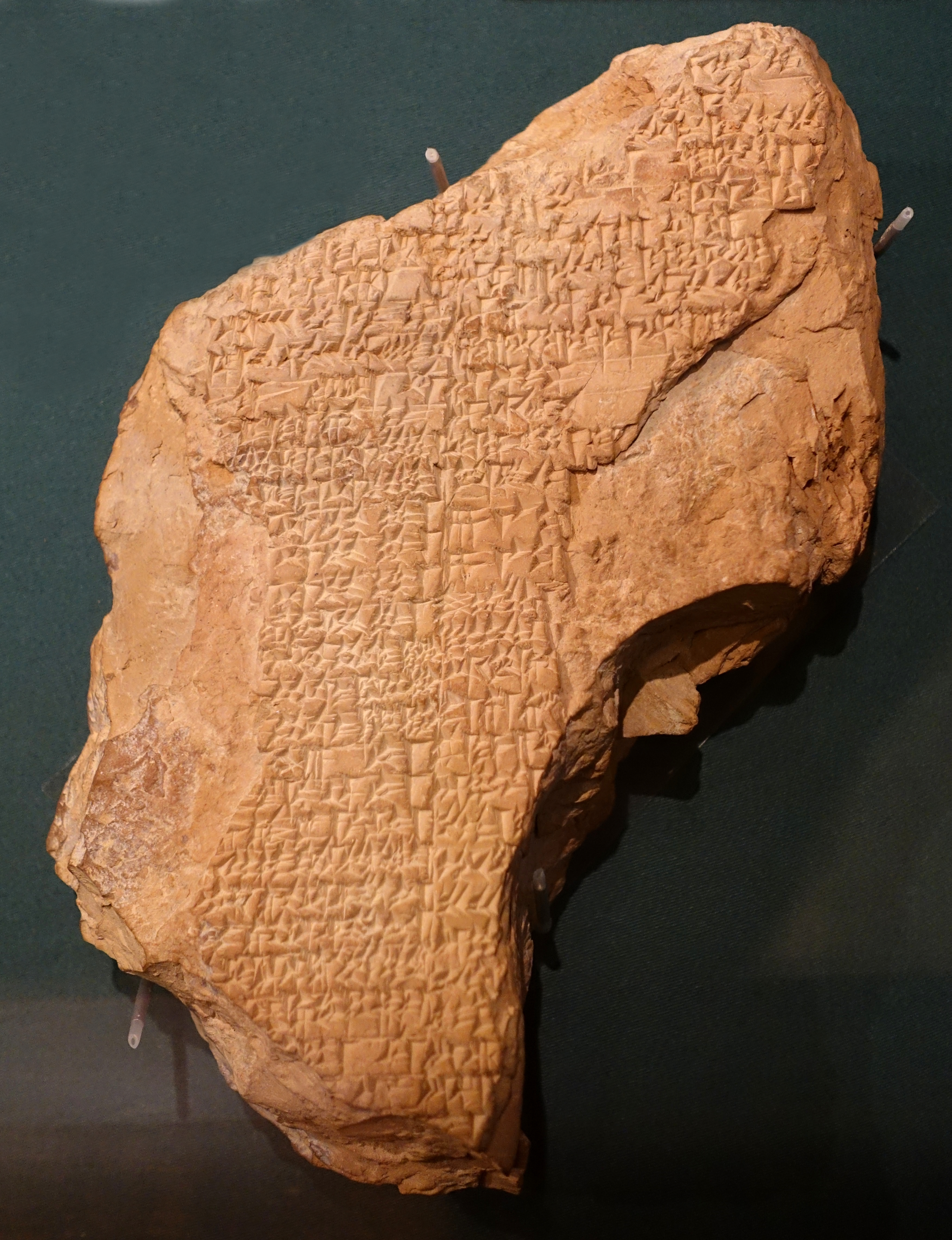
The original Sumerian clay tablet of Inanna and Ebiḫ, which is currently housed in the Oriental Institute at the University of Chicago

Inanna and Ebiḫ, otherwise known as Goddess of the Fearsome Divine Powers, is a 184-line poem written in Sumerian by the Akkadian poet Enheduanna. It describes An's granddaughter Inanna's confrontation with Mount Ebiḫ, a mountain in the Zagros mountain range. An briefly appears in a scene from the poem in which Inanna petitions him to allow her to destroy Mount Ebiḫ. An warns Inanna not to attack the mountain, but she ignores his warning and proceeds to attack and destroy Mount Ebiḫ regardless.

The poem Inanna Takes Command of Heaven is an extremely fragmentary, but important, account of Inanna's conquest of the Eanna temple in Uruk. It begins with a conversation between Inanna and her brother Utu in which Inanna laments that the Eanna temple is not within their domain and resolves to claim it as her own. The text becomes increasingly fragmentary at this point in the narrative, but appears to describe her difficult passage through a marshland to reach the temple, while a fisherman instructs her on which route is best to take. Ultimately, Inanna reaches An, who is shocked by her arrogance, but nevertheless concedes that she has succeeded and that the temple is now her domain. The text ends with a hymn expounding Inanna's greatness. This myth may represent an eclipse in the authority of the priests of An in Uruk and a transfer of power to the priests of Inanna.

=== Akkadian ===
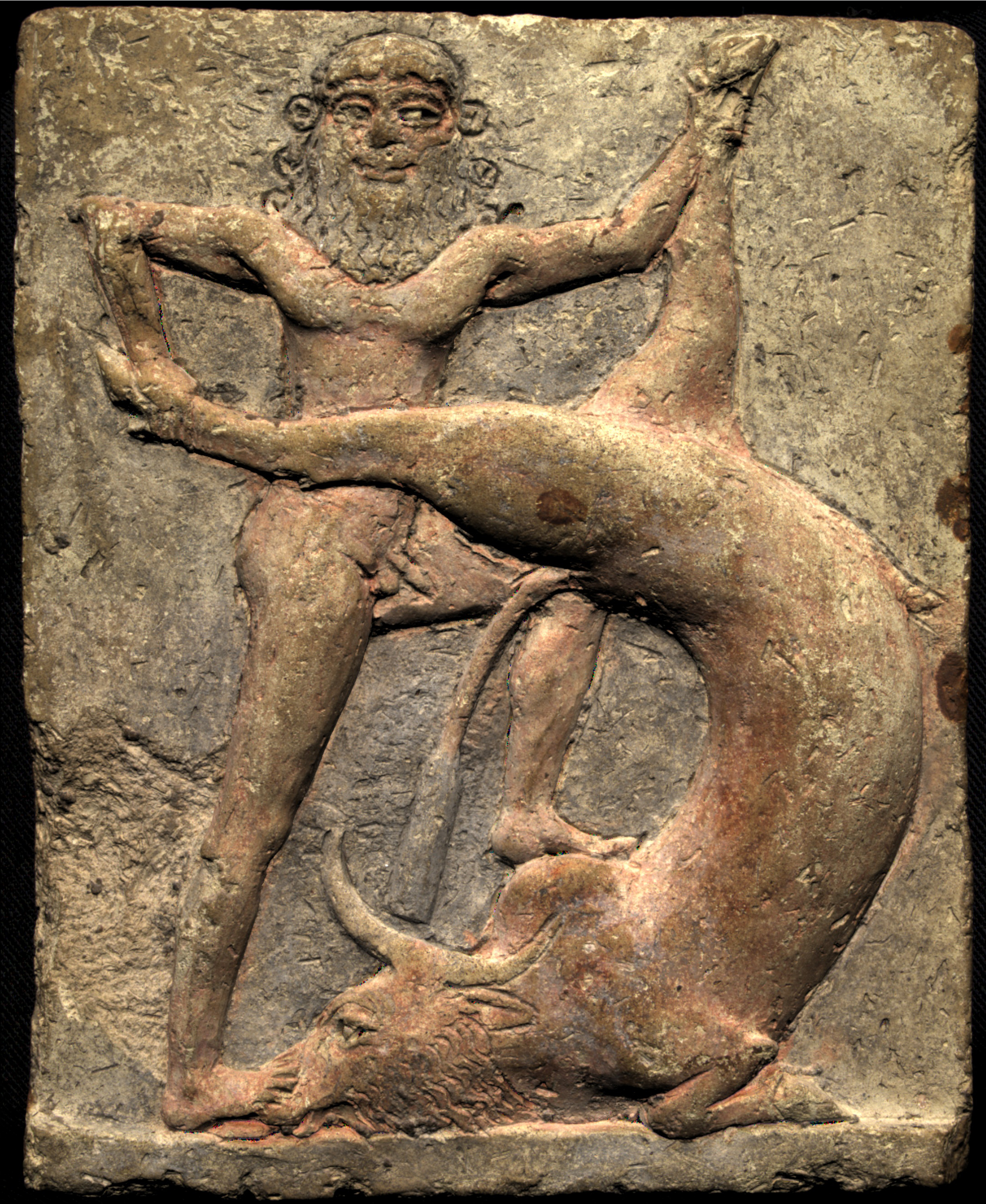
Ancient Mesopotamian terracotta relief showing Gilgamesh slaying the Bull of Heaven, which Anu gives to his daughter Ishtar in Tablet IV of the Epic of Gilgamesh after Gilgamesh spurns her amorous advances.

==== Epic of Gilgamesh ====
In a scene from the Akkadian Epic of Gilgamesh, written in the late second millennium BC, Anu's daughter Ishtar, the East Semitic equivalent to Inanna, attempts to seduce the hero Gilgamesh. When Gilgamesh spurns her advances, Ishtar angrily goes to heaven and tells Anu that Gilgamesh has insulted her. Anu asks her why she is complaining to him instead of confronting Gilgamesh herself. Ishtar demands that Anu give her the Bull of Heaven and swears that if he does not give it to her, she will break down the gates of the Underworld and raise the dead to eat the living. Anu gives Ishtar the Bull of Heaven, and Ishtar sends it to attack Gilgamesh and his friend Enkidu. A scene from the Ugaritic Epic of Aqhat in which the warrior goddess Anat confronts the head god El to demand permission to kill the eponymous hero after being rebuked by him when she asked for his bow has been compared to this section of the Epic of Gilgamesh.

==== Adapa myth ====
In the myth of Adapa, which is first attested during the Kassite Period, Anu notices that the south wind does not blow towards the land for seven days. He asks his sukkal Ilabrat the reason. Ilabrat replies that is because Adapa, the priest of Ea (the East Semitic equivalent of Enki) in Eridu, has broken the south wind's wing. Anu demands that Adapa be summoned before him, but, before Adapa sets out, Ea warns him not to eat any of the food or drink any of the water the gods offer him, because the food and water are poisoned. Adapa arrives before Anu and tells him that the reason he broke the south wind's wing was because he had been fishing for Ea and the south wind had caused a storm, which had sunk his boat. Anu's doorkeepers Dumuzid and Ningishzida speak out in favor of Adapa. This placates Anu's fury and he orders that, instead of the food and water of death, Adapa should be given the food and water of immortality as a reward. Adapa, however, follows Ea's advice and refuses the meal. The story of Adapa was beloved by scribes, who saw him as the founder of their trade and a vast plethora of copies and variations of the myth have been found across Mesopotamia, spanning the entire course of Mesopotamian history. The story of Adapa's appearance before Anu has been compared to the later Jewish story of Adam and Eve, recorded in the Book of Genesis. In the same way that Anu forces Adapa to return to earth after he refuses to eat the food of immortality, Yahweh in the biblical story drives Adam out of the Garden of Eden to prevent him from eating the fruit from the tree of life. Similarly, Adapa was seen as the prototype for all priests; whereas Adam in the Book of Genesis is presented as the prototype of all mankind.

==== Erra and Išum ====
In the epic poem Erra and Išum, which was written in Akkadian in the eighth century BC, Anu gives Erra, the god of destruction, the Sebettu, which are described as personified weapons. Anu instructs Erra to use them to massacre humans when they become overpopulated and start making too much noise (Tablet I, 38ff).

=== Hurrian ===
One of the myths belonging to the so-called "Kumarbi Cycle" features Anu among the deities involved. While known chiefly from a Hittite translation, the myth belongs to a Hurrian cultural milieu, and is largely set in locations in Syria and Mesopotamia, rather than Anatolia. It states that in the distant past, the "king in heaven" was Alalu, and Anu acted as his cupbearer, but does not explain the origin of either deity. After nine years, Anu revolted against his superior, dethroned him and made him flee to the underworld. However, after another nine years, his own cupbearer, Kumarbi, the "scion of Alalu," attacked him to seize kingship for himself. Anu attempted to flee to heaven, but Kumarbi bites off Anu's genitals and swallowed them. As a consequence of swallowing Anu's genitals, Kumarbi becomes impregnated with Anu's son Teshub (Tarḫunna in the Hittite translation) and two other deities, Tashmishu and the river Tigris. Anu taunts him about this. Teshub is subsequently born from Kumarbi's split skull in a manner compared by Beckman to the birth of Athena in Greek mythology, and while the rest of the narrative is poorly preserved it is known that he evades Kumarbi's attempts at destroying him.

Wilfred G. Lambert proposed that a hitherto unknown Mesopotamian myth about a confrontation between Alala and Anu existed and inspired the Hurro-Hittite tradition regarding their conflict.

== Later relevance ==
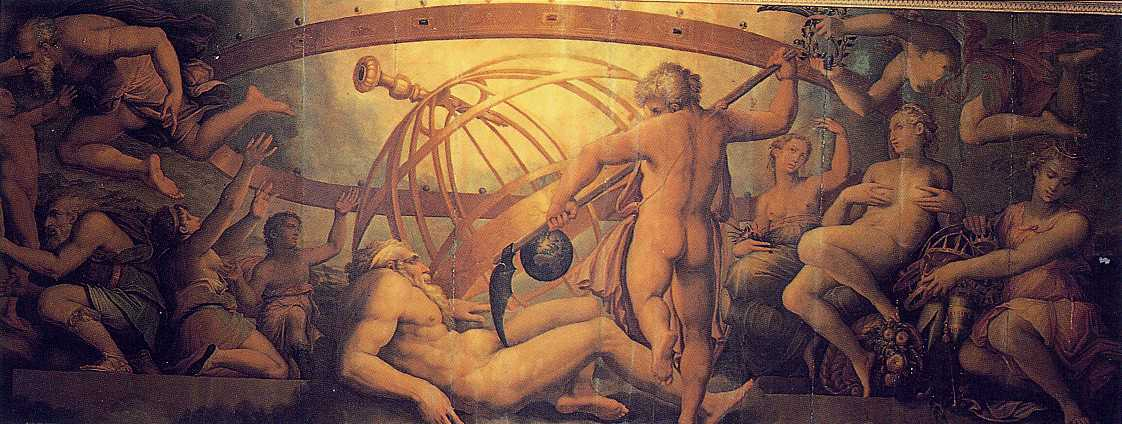
The Mutilation of Uranus by Saturn (c. 1560) by Giorgio Vasari and Cristofano Gherardi. The title uses the Latin names for Ouranos and Kronos, respectively.

A reference to a genealogy of deities similar to Enūma Eliš, and by extension to Anu, is known from the writings of Eudemus of Rhodes, a student of Aristotle, whose work is only preserved as quotations given by Damascius, a neoplatonist writer who lived in the sixth century CE:

Of the barbarians the Babylonians seem to pass over in silence the one first principle and allow for two: Tauthē and Apasōn. They make Apasōn the husband of Tauthē, whom they call "mother of the gods." Of these was born a single child, Mōymis, which is, I understand, the rational world, which descended from the two principles. From them another generation arose, Dachē and Dachos [emend: Lachē and Lachos], then a third one arose from the same pair, Kissarē and Assōros, of whom were born the three: Anos, Illinos [emend: Illilos] and Aos. From Aos and Daukē a son was born, Bēlos, whom they say is the demiurge.

It is not known what source Eudemos relied on, though Berossus can be ruled out with certainty as it is implausible that the former lived long enough to read the works of the latter. Furthermore, the inclusion of Enlil (Illilos) as an equal of Ea (Aos) and Anu (Anos) indicates that while similar to the Enūma Eliš, the source used was not identical to it. A further difference in Eudemus' account is the fact that the origin of Mummu (Mōymis) is clear, while the Babylonian work in mention does not directly explain it.

It has been argued series of divine coups described in the Kumarbi myth later became the basis for the Greek creation story described in the long poem Theogony, written by the Boeotian poet Hesiod in the seventh century BC. However, Gary Beckman points out that it is not impossible that the two myths simply developed from similar motifs present in the ancient Mediterranean shared cultural milieu ("koine") and Hesiod did not necessarily directly depend on the Kumarbi tradition. In Hesiod's poem, the primeval sky-god Ouranos is overthrown and castrated by his son Kronos in much the same manner that Anu is overthrown and castrated by Kumarbi in the Hurrian story. Kronos is then, in turn, overthrown by his own son Zeus. In one Orphic myth, Kronos bites off Ouranos's genitals in exactly the same manner that Kumarbi does to Anu. Nonetheless, Robert Mondi notes that Ouranos never held mythological significance to the Greeks comparable with Anu's significance to the Mesopotamians. Instead, Mondi calls Ouranos "a pale reflection of Anu", noting that "apart from the castration myth, he has very little significance as a cosmic personality at all and is not associated with kingship in any systematic way."

In late antiquity, writers such as Philo of Byblos attempted to impose the dynastic succession framework of the Hittite and Hesiodic stories onto Canaanite mythology, but these efforts are forced and contradict what most Canaanites seem to have actually believed. Most Canaanites seem to have regarded El and Baal as ruling concurrently.

== Genealogy of Sumerian deities ==
An
Ninḫursaĝ	Enki born to Namma	Ninkikurga born to Namma	Nisaba born to Uraš	Ḫaya
Ninsar	Ninlil	Enlil
Ninkurra	Ningal maybe daughter of Enlil	Nanna	Nergal maybe son of Enki	Ninurta maybe born to Ninḫursaĝ	Baba born to Uraš
Uttu	Inanna possibly also the daughter of Enki, of Enlil, or of An	Dumuzid maybe son of Enki	Utu	Ninkigal married Nergal
Meškiaĝĝašer	Lugalbanda	Ninsumun
Enmerkar	Gilgāmeš
Urnungal
