= Lahamu =

Female deity in Akkadian mythology

Genealogy
- Parents: Tiamat and Abzu (Akkadian)
- Consort: brother Lahmu
- Children: Anshar and Kishar

Lahamu (𒀭𒆷𒄩𒈬 , ^{d}la-ḫa-mu) was a minor figure in some variants of Mesopotamian cosmology, the feminine counterpart of Lahmu.

In some god lists she was one of the ancestors of Anu. In Enuma Elish she is the first-born daughter of Tiamat and Abzu. With her brother Lahmu she is the mother of Anshar and Kishar, who were in turn parents of the first gods.

19th and early 20th century researchers incorrectly viewed both Lahmu and Lahamu as the representations of the zodiac, parent-stars, or constellations.

== See also ==
- Lahmu

== Sources ==
- Michael Jordan, Encyclopedia of Gods, Kyle Cathie Limited, 2002
