= Abzu =

Primeval sea in Mesopotamian mythology

Genealogy
- Consort: Tiamat
- Children: Kingu (Babylonian religion), Lahamu, Lahmu, Anu (Sumerian religion)

Abzû or Apsû (Sumerian: 𒀊𒍪, lit. ab = 'water' + zû = 'deep') is the name for fresh water from underground aquifers which was given a religious fertilising quality in ancient near eastern cosmology, including Sumerian and Akkadian mythology. It was believed that all lakes, springs, rivers, fountains, rain, and even the Flood, as described in Atrahasis, originated from the Abzû. In Mesopotamian cosmogony, it is referred to as the freshwater primordial ocean below and above the earth; indeed the Earth itself was regarded as a goddess Ninhursag that was conceived from the mating of male Abzu with female saltwater stream Tiamat. In this worldview, our divine Mother Earth—equipped in her upper half with a bubble of air from the breath of the most ingenious god "Lord Wind" Enli—thus is surrounded by cosmic freshwater and encircled at her edge by that saltwater river. Through the underground of her body, which also contains the Irkalla as a special compartment for the dead's live on there as shadows, runs a tunnel drilled by the sun god Shamash himself, allowing his burning fire during night to rush dry-footed from west to east, where he begins to rise again between the peaks of the Zagros Mountains.

Abzû in Sumerian is also called engar (cuneiform: 𒇉, LAGAB×HAL); in Akkadian Engar (𒀊𒍪), and in Akkadian: engurru. In Greek Abzû is recorded as Ἀπασών Apasṓn.

== In Sumerian culture ==
In the city of Eridu, Enki's temple was known as E_{2}-abzû (house of the deep waters) and was located at the edge of a swamp – an abzû. Certain tanks of holy water in Babylonian and Assyrian temple courtyards were also called abzû (apsû). Typical in religious washing, these tanks were similar to Judaism's mikvot, the washing pools of Islamic mosques, or the baptismal font in Christian churches.

== In Sumerian cosmology ==
The Sumerian god Enki (Ea in the Akkadian language) was believed to have keen eyes and appeared out of the abzû since before human beings were created. His wife Damgalnuna, his mother Nammu, his advisor Isimud and a variety of subservient creatures, such as the gatekeeper Lahmu, also lived in the abzû.

== As a deity ==
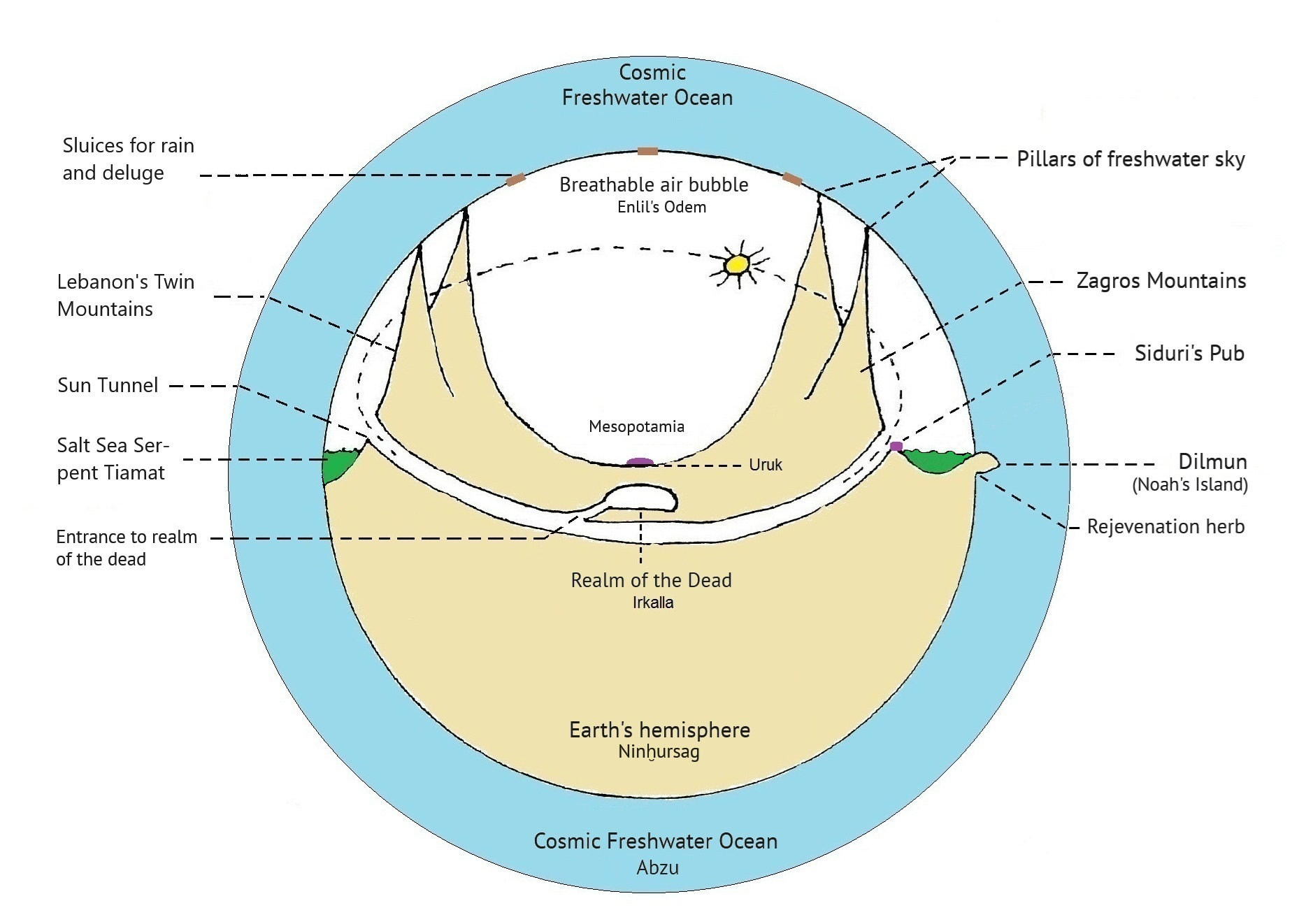
The Sumerian Genesis describes how the cosmic freshwater ocean surrounds our planet (created in its midst) on all sides. Salt sea serpent Tiamat is indicated by the green areas, so the sketch shows the same as Babylon's world map, now in side view. A breathable air bubble clings to the Earth's surface, with the Abzu's boundary layer as a roof, like on Athrahasis' (Noah's) lifeboat. Other details, such as "Noah's" island Dilmun, are taken from the Epic of Gilgamesh. An important technical detail are the gate sluices built into sky. Through them, the gods around Enlil, who knew very well how to construct irrigation systems, supplied their land Eden with rain, but also unleashed the great flood - topics that are related to the Neolithic Revolution. It is likely that Abzû, Tiamat, and the flood represent the source of Leviathan, a human-devouring cosmic sea monster.

Abzû (apsû) is depicted as a deity only in the Babylonian creation epic, the Enūma Eliš, taken from the library of Assurbanipal (c. 630 BCE) but which is about 500 years older. In this story, he was a primal being made of fresh water and a lover to another primal deity, Tiamat, a creature of salt water. The Enūma Eliš begins:

"When above the heavens (e-nu-ma e-liš) did not yet exist

nor the earth below,

Apsû the freshwater ocean was there, the first, the begetter,
and Tiamat, the saltwater sea, she who bore them all;
they were still mixing their waters,
and no pasture land had yet been formed,
nor even a reed marsh."

The act of procreation led to the birth of the younger gods: Enki, Enlil, and Anu. Anchored in the Tablet of Destinies, they founded an organisation to make Mesopotamia fertile through agriculture, but got into a dispute and consequently created the first humans as labour slaves, to peacefully resolve the conflict. The humans multiplied en masse and disturbed the gods around Enlil and Anu with their noise, so that they wanted to use the cosmic freshwater ocean to trigger the great flood and destroy the humans (cf. Athrahasis epic). Enraged by the devastation of earth, Tiamat gave birth to monsters whose bodies she filled with "poison instead of blood" and waged war against her traitorous children. Only Marduk, the founder of Babylon, was able to kill Tiamat and mould the final constitution of heaven and earth from her corpse.

== In popular culture ==
Abzû is a 2016 adventure game that was influenced by Sumerian mythology of Abzû.

== See also ==
- Abyzou – Name of a female demon
- Cosmic ocean – Mythological motif
- Firmament – Solid dome dividing the primal waters
- Nu – Ancient Egyptian personification of the primordial watery abyss
- Varuna – Hindu deity associated with water
- Apsara – Type of female spirit of the clouds and waters in Hindu and Buddhist culture
- Wuji – The primordial in Chinese philosophy
