= Debate between silver and copper =

Sumerian disputation text

The Debate between silver and copper (CSL 5.3.6) is a work of Sumerian literature and one of the six extant works belonging to this literature's genre of disputations poem. It was written on clay tablets and dates to the Third Dynasty of Ur (ca. mid-3rd millennium BC) and runs 196 lines in length. The text was reconstructed by M. Civil in the 1960s. Like other Sumerian disputation poems, it features two typically inanimate things (in this case, two metals) debating over which one is superior.

Silver and Copper, so far as can be indicated from the manuscripts, was the least popular of the known disputation poems: only nine manuscripts are known, compared to 60–70 of Hoe and Plough and Sheep and Grain (the most popular) and 20–30 for the rest. In addition, manuscripts attest two recensions (versions) of the disputation. Recently, an important new manuscript of the text was published by Peterson in 2010.

The prologue is largely lost, although it appears that at some point during it, silver and copper bring Enlil offerings. The first to raise an argument is Silver (though some find this reconstruction contentious), followed by a rebuttal by Copper, followed by a final response by Silver. Although the adjudication scene is almost entirely lost, enough survives that it is clear that Copper won the debate (making it the only Sumerian disputation poem where the contender who does not give the first speech goes on to win). The cause of Copper's victory is that Copper has been demonstrated to be useful for all sorts of purposes, whereas Silver is merely for show or decoration.

The poem also praises Ur-Namma, indicating its composition in the Ur III period. Two of the other six disputation poems (Bird and Fish, Tree and Reed) also mention and praise a particular king from this era, which supports the contention by some historians that the Sumerian disputation poems were courtly compositions of the Ur III era, although some of them might have been earlier and simply underwent additional recensions in the Ur III era.
