= Eduba =

Mesopotamian scribal institution

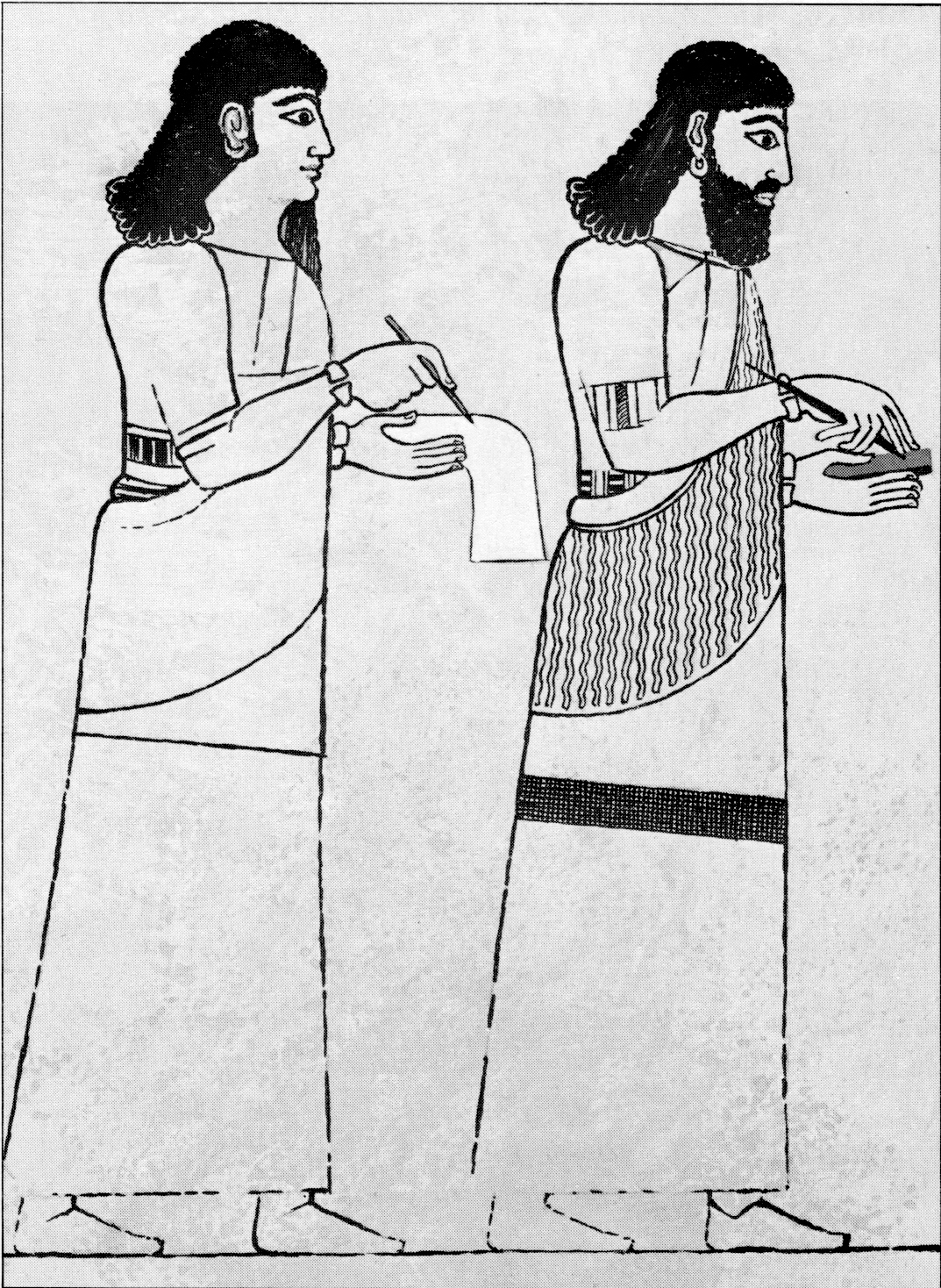
Assyrian scribes.

An eduba (Note: Also transcribed e-duba, e-dubba, edubba, edubah, eduba'a, e_{2}-dub-ba-a) (Sumerian: 𒂍𒁾𒁀𒀀, romanized: e_{2}-dub-ba-a, lit. 'house where tablets are passed out') is a scribal school for the Sumerian language. The eduba was the institution that trained and educated young scribes in ancient Mesopotamia during the late third or early second millennium BCE. Most of the information known about edubas comes from cuneiform texts dating to the Old Babylonian period (ca. 2000-1600 BCE).

== Archaeological evidence ==
Archaeological evidence for the Old Babylonian school system suggests that scribal education was small-scale and usually took place in private homes. School tablets have been found in private residences in many sites across Mesopotamia. Some houses, where particularly large numbers of school tablets were unearthed, have been interpreted by archaeologists as "school houses" or homes in which scribal education almost certainly took place. The best example of this is House F in the city of Nippur. Nearly one and a half thousand fragments of tablets were found at this house. They date to the 17th century BCE (short chronology) (the early part of Samsu-iluna's reign), and the majority of them were students' school exercises. Two other possible "school houses" are located at the site of Ur. The first is a house called No. 7 Quiet Street, where a smaller number of school texts was found in situ and date to the late 18th or early 17th century BCE (short chronology) (reigns of Rim-Sin II or as late as Samsu-iluna year 11). The second is a house called No. 1 Broad Street, where a larger number of school tablets was discovered. Some texts from No. 1 Broad Street may date to as late as Samsu-iluna year 11 (1674 BCE short chronology, 1738 middle chronology). Unfortunately, it is unclear whether this house is the school texts' original place of use. Another Old Babylonian home in which scribal training took place is the house of a man named Ur-Utu, located in the ancient city of Sippar-Amnanum.

== Texts about the eduba ==
The modern idea of how the eduba functioned is based partially on descriptions from Sumerian literature (this is especially true of earlier scholarship - e.g., Sjöberg 1975, Kramer 1949). A number of stories are set in the scribal school or attest to what life was like as a scribal student. These are sometimes referred to by modern scholars as "eduba literature" (not to be confused with a second meaning of this term- any composition learned and copied by scribal students) or "school stories." They include the compositions "Schooldays" (Eduba A); "A Scribe and his Perverse Son" (Eduba B); "The Advice of a Supervisor to a Younger Scribe" (Eduba C); "Scribal Activities"(Eduba D); "Instructions of the Ummia" (Eduba E); and "Regulations of the E-duba" (Eduba R). A few Sumerian dialogues also touch on elements of student life, including "A Dialogue Between Two Scribes" (Dialogue 1); "A dialogue between Enki-hengal and Enkita-lu" (Dialogue 2); and Enki-manshum and Girini-isag (Dialogue 3). Several royal hymns, recounting the exploits of Mesopotamian kings, also make reference to the institution of the eduba; these include the compositions Šulgi B; Lipit-Ešter B; Išme-Dagan V; and Enlil-Bani A. Several Old Babylonian letters and proverbs also allude to scribal education or the eduba.

The historical accuracy of eduba literature and other texts referring to the eduba - the extent to which they describe the reality of Old Babylonian scribal education - has been called into question in more recent scholarship. Archaeological evidence suggests that scribal training during the Old Babylonian took place in private houses, rather than large public institutions. This has led some scholars to suggest that the content of "eduba literature" actually refers to an earlier institution, dating to the Ur III period. Others maintain simply that the literary accounts are exaggerated or anachronistic, or that they reflect an idealized image of the school system.

== Tablets bearing student exercises ==
A lot of student learning was done by writing out cuneiform compositions ("school texts") on clay tablets. A large number of tablets preserving scribal students' exercises (called "exercise tablets") have been found at sites throughout the Near East. These come in different shapes and sizes, depending on the level of the student and on how advanced the assignment was. The following is a typology of tablet shapes developed by modern scholars, based primarily on tablets from the Old Babylonian city of Nippur. The extent to which the same typology applies to exercise tablets from other cities in which scribes were being trained is not yet clear.

=== Type I ===
Type I tablets are multi-column tablets usually containing several hundred lines of a composition written out by a student in two or more columns. These tablets are often large enough to accommodate an entire composition and sometimes even contain parts of multiple compositions. In cases where a whole composition does not fit on a single tablet, it may be spread out across multiple tablets.

Because Type I tablets tend to be very carefully written and contain long texts, it is assumed that they represent the work of relatively advanced students.

=== Type II ===
Type II tablets are formatted with two or more columns on the obverse (the front of the tablet), and multiple columns of a (usually) different text on the reverse (the back of the tablet). The left-hand column of the obverse contains a passage or "extract" from a school text (usually about 8-15 lines, but sometimes as long as 30) written in a neat hand, presumably by the teacher. The right-hand column(s) contain a copy of the passage, usually more sloppily written and presumably written by the student. The student's copy would have been erased and re-written multiple times, and many of the extant Type II tablets are blank on the right-hand side (or, as is most common, the right-hand side has broken off completely). The reverse of a Type II tablet usually contains an excerpt of a different school text, one the student would have learned earlier in his education.

Type II tablets are by far the most common type of exercise tablet discovered at Nippur. Proportionately fewer Type II tablets are known from other sites, but it is possible that more were found but never published; Type II tablets are usually somewhat distorted-looking (often broken or erased), meaning that looters are less likely to have kept and sold them, and early excavators are perhaps less likely to have published them.

=== Type III ===
Type III tablets, also known as extract tablets or imgidas (Sumerian for "long tablet"), are single-column tablets containing extracts (usually around 40-60 lines) from longer compositions, often belonging to the advanced stages of scribal education

=== Type IV ("Lentils") ===
Type IV tablets, also known as "lentils", are circular tablets containing one or a few lines of a composition written out once by the teacher and then a second time by the student. The student's copy appears either underneath the teacher's inscription (typical of Nippur tablets), or on the reverse (more typical of other sites).

=== Prisms ===
Prisms are large clay objects with multiple faces (usually four to nine), pierced through the center from top to bottom with a hole. A prism usually bears a complete cuneiform text, written in sections across all of the faces.

Prisms were seemingly inscribed by advanced scribal students, in very careful writing, and they are relatively rare. A possible explanation for this is that they served as exams. Another theory is that these texts were created as votive offerings, to be dedicated in temples to Mesopotamian deities.

== Scribal curriculum at Nippur ==
The curriculum for young students learning to write in edubas of the city of Nippur has been reconstructed from texts found at this site that date to the Old Babylonian period. It is unclear to what extent this same curriculum was followed in other cities.

=== Elementary education ===
At the first level of Sumerian scribal education, students learned the basics of cuneiform writing and Sumerian by writing out long lists of signs and words and by copying simple texts. This level of education was broken down into four stages.

==== First stage: writing techniques ====
In the earliest stage of education, students learned the fundamentals of cuneiform writing: how to work with clay and form tablets, how to handle a stylus, how to make basic signs, and how to write simple things like personal names. In the earliest exercises of Stage 1, students repeatedly copied out the three elements of a cuneiform sign: the vertical wedge, the horizontal wedge, and the oblique wedge. Once the wedge shapes had been mastered, the student could start combining them to make simple signs. Some exercise tablets show the student practicing a simple sign or signs over and over again. Next, the student learned to write out a list of signs known as Syllable Alphabet B (also sometimes referred to as the "Sumerian Primer"). Each entry in this list comprised a few signs, or syllables, which sometimes resembled Sumerian words or personal names but actually contained little meaning. They were designed to teach the student the correct sign forms. Outside of Nippur, a similar list – known as Syllable Alphabet A -- was taught in place of Syllable Alphabet B. In some cases, the student also had to write out columns of Akkadian words, forming a list known as Syllable Vocabulary A.

Another list designed to teach students the basics of cuneiform writing is known as TU-TA-TI. In this list, which students wrote out sets of signs grouped according to their initial sounds. Each cuneiform sign represents a syllable (unlike the English alphabet, where each letter represents a sound), thus, for example, the sequence "tu-ta-ti" consists of three signs. The signs within each set in the list were ordered by their vowel sounds: -u followed by –a followed by –i . Each sign in the set was first written on its own line, and then all three signs were written together on a fourth line. Thus the first 8 lines of TU-TA-TI are:

tu
ta
ti
tu-ta-ti
nu
na
ni
nu-na-ni

Students in Stage 1 of their education also learned to write lists of personal names, comprising Sumerian or Akkadian names.

==== Second stage: thematic noun lists ====
In the second stage of elementary scribal education, students started learning words and logograms. They memorized and wrote out thematically organized lists of nouns (which later developed into the first-millennium lexical list UR_{5}.RA = hubullu). By memorizing this list, students learned Sumerian words for objects in different categories, including trees and wooden objects; reeds and reed objects; vessels and clay; hides and leather objects, metals and metal objects; types of animals and meat; stones and plants, etc.

==== Third stage: advanced lists ====
In the third stage of elementary education, students learned numbers, measurements, and common formulas used in economic contracts. They also learned more complex lists than those memorized in earlier stages: the sign-list Proto-Ea, the thematic list Proto-Lu_{2}, and a set of acrographic lists (lists with entries organized by the first or main sign), including Proto-Izi, Proto-Kagal, and Nigga. The sign-list Proto-Diri was also learned during the third stage of elementary education. A number of other, less frequently attested lists could be learned at this point: the body-part list Ugu-mu; a list of legal phrases (an early version of the list known as ana ittišu); a list of deities called the Nippur God list; the Old Babylonian version of a list of professions called lu_{2}-azlag_{2} = ašlāku; and a list of diseases.

==== Fourth stage: simple Sumerian texts ====
In the fourth stage of elementary education, students began working with full sentences in Sumerian. They copied out model contracts and legal texts – e.g., contracts documenting the sale of houses – and, finally, Sumerian proverbs. With the study of proverbs, students transitioned into the second level of education; namely, Sumerian literature.

=== Advanced education ===
Advanced eduba students memorized and wrote out Sumerian literary texts, beginning with the simple proverbs and progressing to much longer works.

==== The Tetrad ====
In the transitional stage from elementary to advanced scribal training, students memorized and wrote out four literary compositions known as the "Tetrad". The Tetrad comprises the following compositions:

- Lipit-Eshtar B
- Iddin-Dagan B
- Enlil Bani A
- Nisaba A.

==== The Decad ====
The second stage of advanced scribal education at Nippur involved memorization and writing out a group of ten compositions designated by modern scholars as the Decad. The Decad includes the following compositions:

- Šulgi A
- Lipit-Eštar A
- Song of the Hoe
- Inana B
- Enlil A
- Kesh Temple Hymn
- Enki's Journey to Nippur
- Inana and Ebiḫ
- Nungal A
- Gilgamesh and Huwawa, Version A

==== Other curricular groups of texts ====
Other groups of Sumerian literary compositions have also been posited as collections of texts to be learned as part of a school curriculum. One such group referred to as the "House F Fourteen," named for the Old Babylonian house at Nippur where many copies of the texts were found, together with over a thousand other school tablets. The House F Fourteen comprise the following:

- Eduba B
- Eduba C
- Gilgameš, Enkidu, and the Nether World
- Deeds and Exploits of Ninurta
- Cursing of Agade
- Šulgi Hymn B
- Ur Lament
- Instructions of Šuruppag
- Schooldays (Eduba A)
- Debate between Sheep and Grain
- Dumuzid's Dream
- Farmer's Instructions
- Eduba Dialogue 1
- Debate between Hoe and Plough

Another group of texts that could be learned around the same stage of education as the Decad was a selection of letters from the Correspondence of the Kings of Ur. This corpus did not form a cohesive curricular group, however; evidently it was up to individual schoolteachers to decide which letters to teach.

At least two other sets of literary letters were also sometimes learned by scribal students in Old Babylonian Nippur: the "Sumerian Epistolary Miscellany (SEpM), a fairly standardized group comprising eighteen letters and four other compositions, and the Correspondence of the Kings of Larsa (CKL), a group of four letters from or to rulers of Larsa. Other letters not belonging to a definable set were also sometimes studied; these are grouped together by modern scholars under the term "Additional Nippur Letters" or "Ancillary Nippur Letters" (ANL).

== Student life ==
Students of the eduba probably began their education as young children. They were primarily boys, although female scribes are also attested in ancient Mesopotamian society. The eduba literature paints a vivid, if highly embellished, picture of daily life for young scribal students.

According to these compositions, a boy would leave his parents' home in the morning, go to the eduba, and begin his lessons for the day. These included things like reciting texts learned previously and forming new tablets to inscribe.

Punishments for misbehavior - talking out of turn, going out at the wrong time, writing poorly, etc. - could be harsh: in one exaggerated account, a student describes being beaten no less than seven times in a single day.

After a day at school, the student would go home again to his parents, where he might tell them about the events of his day or recite homework assignments to them.

These reports in the eduba literature provide entertaining, often sympathetic stories about what life was like for an Old Babylonian scribal student; however, they are idealized to a great extent, and their historical accuracy should not be assumed.
