= Tamarisk and Palm =

Akkadian debate poems

Tamarisk and Palm is an Akkadian disputation poem written on clay tablets and dates to the 18th century BC from the reign of Hammurabi. The poem features an argument between a tamarisk and a date palm; the Tamarisk leads in the name of the poem because it presents the first speech during the debate, followed by a reply from Palm. The text is fragmentary but appears to have followed the typical structure of Sumerian disputation poems. It was the most famous Akkadian disputation poem of antiquity, with its manuscripts ranging from the 18th to 12th centuries BC, and it continues to be the best-known Akkadian disputation today.

Some have classified Tamarisk and Palm as a Sumerian disputation, but this is on the basis of a Sumerian fragment that turns out to have been translated from an Akkadian original. There is one Sumerian topos and loanword from the Akkadian text that occurs during its cosmogonic prologue, rendered as "in those days", which refers to a primeval and mythical time outside of history.

In Mesopotamian disputation literature, debates between trees is a recurring theme. In Sumerian disputations, there is the Debate between tree and reed. In other Akkadian poems, there is also both the Palm and Vine and the Series of the Poplar. A much later example from Aesop's fables is The Oak and the Reed.

== Synopsis ==
The cosmogonical prologue of the text traces from the beginning of creation to the occasion that led to the rivalry between the two plants, when a king decides to plant a tamarisk and a date palm into his garden. It reads as follows according to the Emar recension: (Note: For the versions of the prologue as found in the other two recensions of the text, see George 2020.)

In those distant days, in those distant nights, in those far-away years, When the gods established the land, They built the cities for the far-away people, When they piled up the mountains And excavated the rivers, the (grantor) of life for the land, The gods of the land held a counsel, The god[s …] (5) were pondering with each other. Šamaš was sitting among them, And [the great Lady of the Gods] took a seat. Before then, there had been no monarchy in the land, And [sovereignty] had remained [with the god]s (alone). (But) the gods had mercy on the black-headed people (And) gave a king to the people of the land of Kiš, [The king planted a palm in his palace,] And grew a tamarisk nearby. In the shade of the tamari[sk banquets were laid out,] (…) (10) In the shade of the palm [the drum] res[ounded]. (…) Both trees were enemies, and would constantly vie with each other.

In the poem, they both seek to establish their superiority by describing their utility to and the commodities that they provide humans. Palm cites the inability of Tamarisk to produce fruit, whereas it produces fruits served to royalty. Tamarisk by contrast cites its high-quality wood which is used to build divine statues. Provoked further, Tamarisk proceeds to list many appliances found in palaces that are made of its wood. Tamarisk argues:

Tamarisk answered and spake unto Palm, / "Consider what is yours among the palace equipment! / "On my table the king eats, / "And from my basket, the warriors eat. / "[I am a we]aver—I warp the threads, / I clothe the troops and brighten [the king]. / "I am an exorcist—I purify the temple, / "[I am truly superior]—I have no rival!"

Palm cites the ignoble use of Tamarisk by beer brewers; Tamarisk counters with its use by smiths and then cites the ignoble use of Palm by butchers. The back-and-forths continue, as Palm rebuts by mentioning that the woodworkers who fashion wood from Tamarisk rely on Palm for shade, but Tamarisk begins to describe its agricultural utility. Palm is infuriated by this argument: Palm lists the abundant manner of uses that rope fashioned from it is put to work by farmers. The last speech by Tamarisk and Palm is too fragmentary to reconstruct, and after that, the remaining text breaks off. The winner of the dispute is not recorded by extant manuscripts. One suggestion holds that Palm may have won because in later Babylonian literature, it receives the epithet šar iṣṣī, "king of the trees".

== Manuscripts ==
The first critical edition and translation of the text was published by Wilfred Lambert in 1996. Lambert knew the work from three recensions (versions): one from Old Babylonian manuscripts discovered from Šaduppûm (Tell Harmal), a second from Middle Assyrian tablets, and a third (and lowest quality) manuscript that dates one or two centuries after the Middle Assyrian period. In addition, another manuscript from Emar was published and edited in 1989, but as it is not accessible to researchers, a new edition after Lambert's has not been produced.

Although manuscripts of the text are not known from the 1st millennium BC, it may have been mentioned in a catalogue of texts from Kuyunjik.

== Popular culture ==
In 2019, the Iraqi-American artist Michael Rakowitz put together an exhibition at the Green Art Gallery in Los Angeles titled Dispute Between the Tamarisk and the Date Palm, in inspiration by the Akkadian disputation. The duration of the exhibition was from March 9 – September 1, 2019.

== Sources ==
- Gadotti, Alhena (2014). Gilgamesh, Enkidu, and the Netherworld and the Sumerian Gilgamesh Cycle. De Gruyter.
- George, Andrew (2020). "The Tamarisk, the Date-Palm and the King: A Study of the Prologues of the Oldest Akkadian Disputation". In Jimenez, Enrique; Mittermayer, Catherine (eds.). Disputation Literature in the Near East and Beyond (PDF). De Gruyter. pp. 75–90.
- Jimenez, Enrique (2017). "The Babylonian Disputation Poems: With Editions of the Series of the Poplar, Palm and Vine, the Series of the Spider, and the Story of the Poor, Forlorn Wren". The Babylonian Disputation Poems. Brill. ISBN 978-90-04-33626-1.
- Lambert, Wilfred (1996). Babylonian Wisdom Literature. Eisenbrauns. ISBN 978-0-931464-94-2.
- Otero, Andrés Piquer (2020). "Those Who Cannot Do, Reign? The Sources of the Fable of Jotham". In Jimenez, Enrique; Mittermayer, Catherine (eds.). Disputation Literature in the Near East and Beyond. De Gruyter. pp. 143–156. ISBN 978-1-5015-1021-2.
- West, M.L. (2013). Hellenica: Volume III: Philosophy, Music and Metre, Literary Byways, Varia. Oxford University Press. ISBN 978-0-19-960503-3.
