= Akkadian disputations =

Akkadian genre of debate poems

The Akkadian disputation poem or Akkadian debate, also known as the Babylonian disputation poem, is a genre of Akkadian literature in the form of a disputation. They feature a dialogue or a debate involving two contenders, usually cast as inarticulate beings such as particular objects, plants, animals, and so forth. Extant compositions from this genre date from the early 2nd millennium BC, the earliest example being the Tamarisk and Palm, to the late 1st millennium BC. These poems occur in verse and follow a type of meter called 2||2 or Vierheber, which is the same meter found in some other Akkadian texts like the Enuma Elish.

None of the known Akkadian disputation poems are translations of works of the same, but earlier genre, in the Sumerian language, namely the Sumerian disputations; Akkadian disputations utilize different literary conventions and verse structure, debate different topics, and so on, although Tamarisk and Palm has one Sumerian loanword. Nevertheless, some remarkable phraseological continuity is attested, such as between Hoe and Plough with the Akkadian Palm and Vine, even though two millennia separate their composition. The disputants of some of the poems are also similar to the disputants of some Sumerian disputations. For example, Tamarisk and Palm and Palm and Vine both feature two plant contenders: this is alike the Sumerian Debate between tree and reed.

Akkadian disputations, despite being more recent than their Sumerian counterpart, have significantly more fragmentary manuscripts. A dozen lines survive of the Donkey Disputation and that less than a tenth is now known of the Series of the Poplar and the Series of the Fox, which, originally, would have been hundreds of verses in length.

Scholarly work on the Akkadian disputations was first synthesized by Wilfred Lambert.

== Structure ==
Akkadian disputations share a rigid structure alongside earlier Sumerian disputations, which is also evident in disputations that occur in disputations from later periods in languages including Syriac, Arabic, Persian, and Turkish. The structure is as follows:

1. Prologue
2. Disputation between two contenders
3. Adjudication scene (where the winner is declared)

The prologue introduces the story from the beginning of time and presents a cosmogony explaining the origins of the cosmos, and in this context, alludes or foreshadows the rivalry between the two contenders even from this early period.

The disputation is a dialogue between the two (or, one occasion, more) contenders. Arguments either involve citing their own positive quality or utility to humans, or degrading the utility of the other. Narration is frequent, unlike in some of the disputations that occur in Aesop's fables, occurring only in small segments in Series of the Fox and Nissaba and Wheat.

The adjudication scene involves one or both contenders appealing to a third-party to determine the winner of the dispute. In Sumerian disputations, the third party is either a king or a god (like Enlil). The fragmentary nature of Akkadian disputations prevents a clear determination of whether this continued in these texts. Some probably did, however the two Akkadian poems whose adjudication scenes are preserved, Series of the Fox and Nissaba and Wheat, do not end in such a manner.

== List of Akkadian disputations ==
- Donkey Disputation
- Nissaba and the Wheat
- Palm and Vine
- Series of Ox and Horse
- Series of the Fox
- Story of the Poor, Forlorn Wren
- Series of the Poplar
- Series of the Spider
- Tamarisk and Palm
