= Palm and Vine =

Second century BCE poem in the Akkadian language

Palm and Vine is an Akkadian disputation poem. It contains a disputation poem between two litigants, Palm (designated by the rare name arḫānû) and Vine (Akkadian karānu), each of which praises its own merits and many uses, and discredits those of its rival. The text may have been composed in the second-millennium BCE, but only first-millennium manuscripts of it are known (see Manuscripts of the Text). Fifty-four lines from the middle section of the text are preserved, which begin in medias res with a long speech of Palm, immediately followed by Vine's rejoinder. Three library manuscripts of the poem are known, as well as an excerpt on a peculiar school tablet.

The Palm and Vine is a testament to the continuity between Akkadian disputation literature and earlier Sumerian disputation poems. The Palm and Vine, for example, contains remarkable phraseological similarities with the Debate between the hoe and the plough, even though the latter is attested from manuscripts which predate it by two millennia. It is also one of several examples of disputation poems between two plants, others among it being the Sumerian Debate between tree and reed and the other Akkadian poems Tamarisk and Palm and Series of the Poplar.

== Manuscripts of the Text ==
The three library manuscripts, and perhaps also the school tablet, stem from Achaemenid or Hellenistic Uruk. Internal evidence, however, suggests that the poem is not a Hellenistic composition, but an older text preserved only in later manuscripts. That the text should have found echo only in one southern city is perhaps explicable if one considers that the palm is the most iconic tree in southern Babylonia. Vines, by contrast, are not native to the Uruk area: to Mesopotamian ears, a dispute between a palm and a vine (or between date beer and wine) may have sounded like a debate between the South and the North, or between native and imported produce.

Palm and Vine is not mentioned in any ancient catalogue, which may suggest that it was part of a longer series, perhaps the Series of the Poplar, under which name it would have been booked by ancient librarians. The first manuscript of the text (MS UrkHel3 – a damaged tablet riddled with corruptions) was published in the 1990s; the text itself was first published in 2017, and a new manuscript came to light a year later. The present edition follows the editio princeps closely, but includes also a few small improvements.
