= Debate between bird and fish =

Sumerian language literature essay on clay tablets

The "Debate between bird and fish" (CSL 5.3.5) is an essay written in the Sumerian language on clay tablets, dating back to the late 3rd millennium BC. It belongs to the genre of Sumerian disputation.

== Genre ==
Six Sumerian disputations are known from Sumerian literature, falling into the literary genre of disputations. Aside from Bird and Fish, other examples include:

- Debate between Winter and Summer
- Debate between sheep and grain
- Debate between tree and reed
- Debate between silver and copper

These appeared a few centuries after writing was established in Sumerian Mesopotamia. The debates are philosophical and address humanity's place in the world.

== Description ==
The bird and fish debate is a 190-line text of cuneiform script. It begins with a discussion of the gods having given Mesopotamia and dwelling places for humans; for water for the fields, the Tigris and Euphrates Rivers, and the marshes, marshland, grazing lands for humans, and the birds of the marshes, and fish are all given. The debate then begins starting with Fish addressing Bird.

== Summary ==
=== Fish speaks first ===
The initial speech of Fish:

...Bird...there is no insult, ..! Croaking ...noise in the marshes ...squawking! Forever gobbling away greedily, while your heart is dripping with evil! Standing on the plain you can keep pecking away until they chase you off! The farmer's sons lay lines and nets for you..(and continues)..You cause damage in the vegetable plots..(more)..Bird, you are shameless: you fill the courtyard with your droppings. The courtyard sweeper-boy who cleans the house chases after you...(etc)

The 2nd and 3rd paragraphs continue:

They bring you into the fattening shed. They let you moo like cattle, bleat like sheep. They pour out cool water in jugs for you. They drag you away for the daily sacrifice. (the 2nd, 3rd paragraphs continue for several lines)

=== Bird's initial retort ===
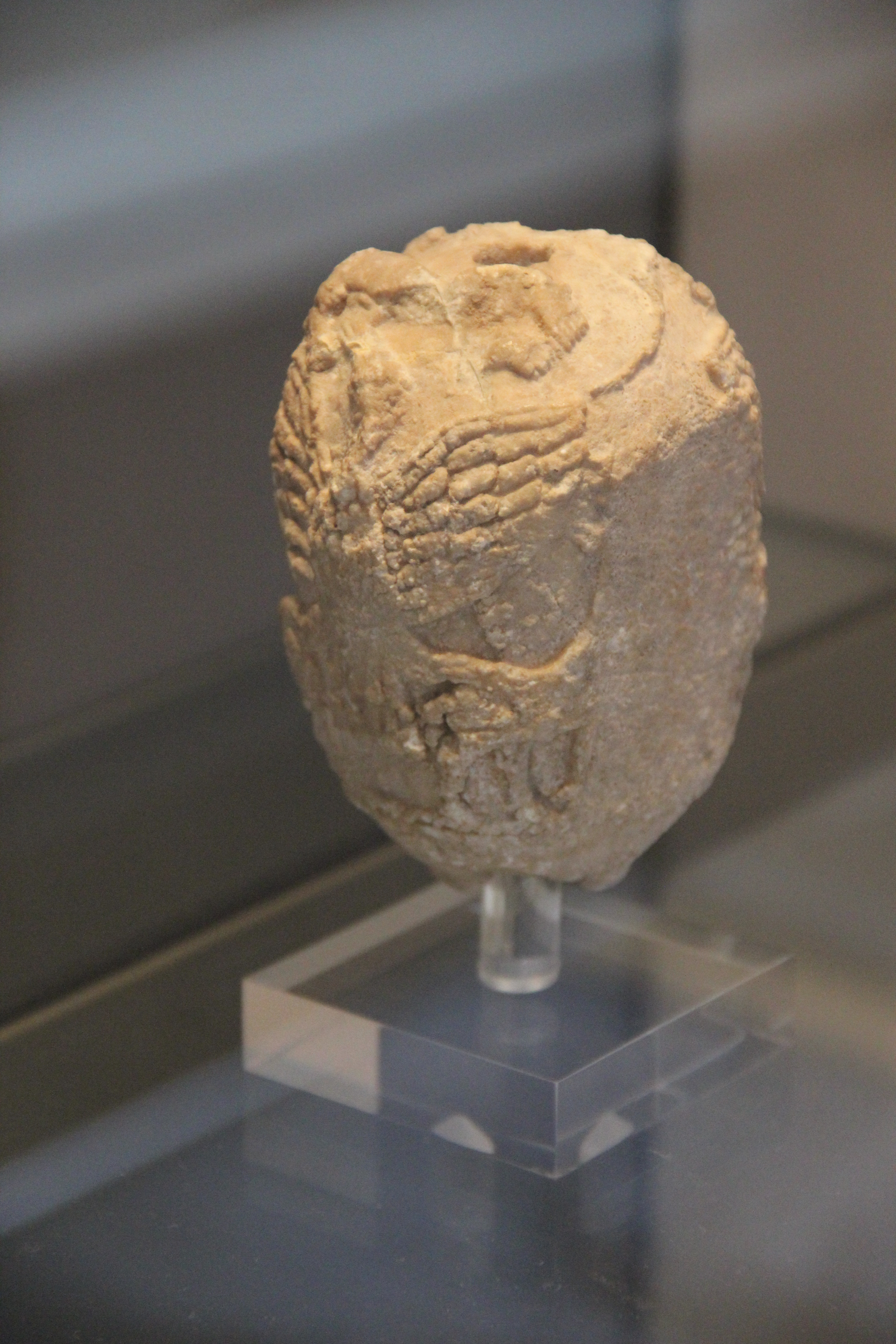
Carved bird from Sumer, c. 2900–2340 BC

Bird replies:

How has your heart become so arrogant, while you yourself are so lowly? Your mouth is flabby(?), but although your mouth goes all the way round, you can not see behind you. You are bereft of hips, as also of arms, hands and feet – try bending your neck to your feet! Your smell is awful; you make people throw-up; they sneer at you!...

Bird continues:

But I am the beautiful and clever Bird! Fine artistry went into my adornment. But no skill has been expended on your holy shaping! Strutting about in the royal palace is my glory; my warbling is considered a decoration in the courtyard. The sound I produce, in all its sweetness, is a delight for the person of Shulgi, son of Enlil...

=== Šulgi rules in favor of Bird ===
After the initial speech and retort, Fish attacks Bird's nest. Battle ensues between the two of them, in more words. Near the end Bird requests that Shulgi decide in Bird's favor:

Šulgi proclaims:

To strut about in the E-kur is a glory for Bird, as its singing is sweet. At Enlil's holy table, Bird ...precedence over you...!

(lacuna)...Bird ...Because Bird was victorious over Fish in the dispute between Fish and Bird, Father Enki be praised!-(end of line 190, final line)

== See also ==
- List of Sumerian debates
