= Ebiḫ =

Mesopotamian god representing Hamrin Mountains

- Deified Hamrin Mountains
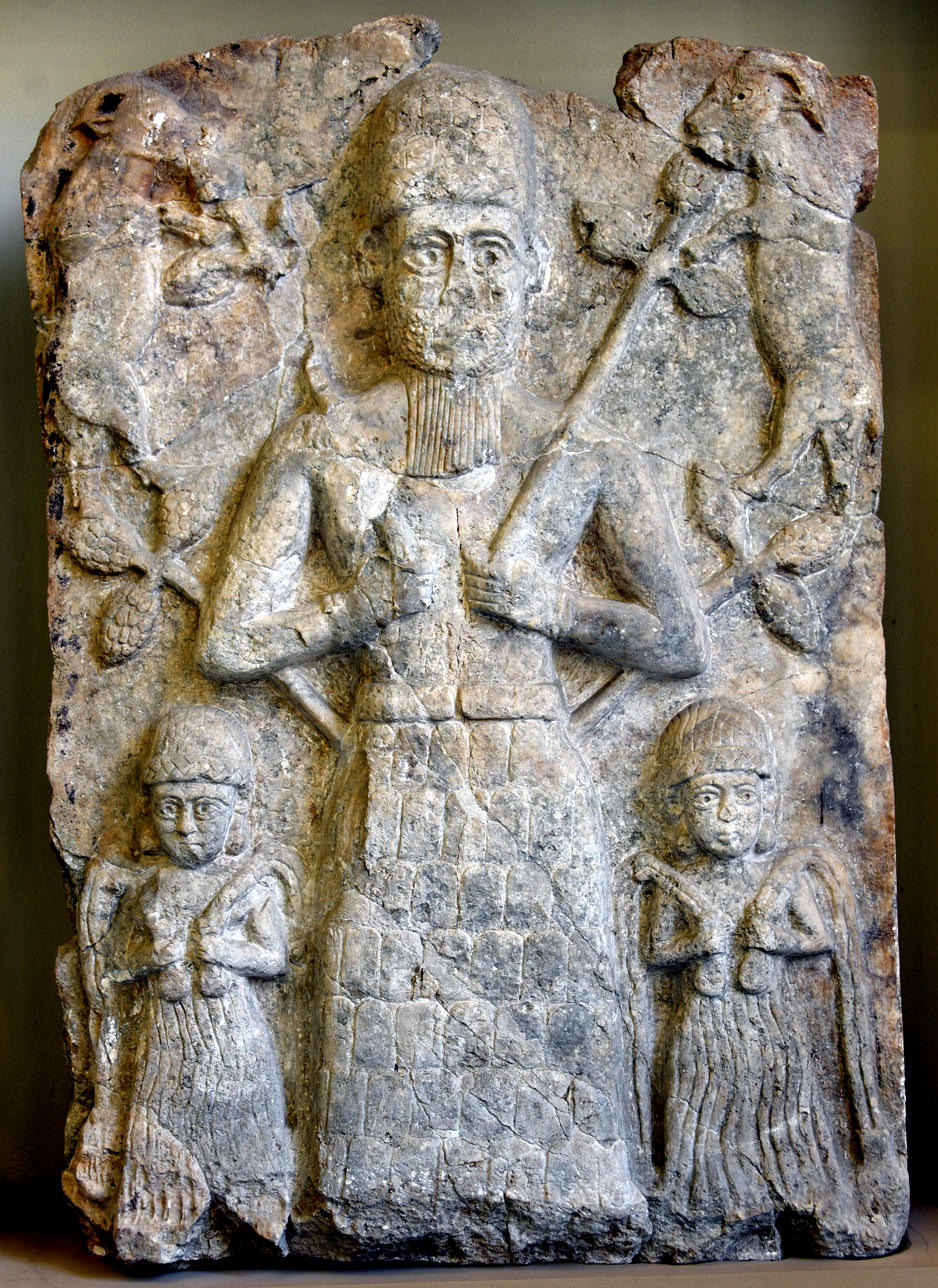
- A possible depiction of Ebiḫ flanked by two smaller figures on a relief from Assur.
- Major cult center: Assur

Ebiḫ (Ebih) was a Mesopotamian god presumed to represent the Hamrin Mountains. It has been suggested that while such an approach was not the norm in Mesopotamian religion, no difference existed between the deity and the associated location in his case. It is possible that he was depicted either in a non-anthropomorphic or only partially anthropomorphic form. He appears in theophoric names from the Diyala area, Nuzi and Mari from between the Early Dynastic and Old Babylonian periods, and in later Middle Assyrian ones from Assyria. He was also actively venerated in Assur in the Neo-Assyrian period, and appears in a number of royal Tākultu rituals both as a mountain and as a personified deity.

The defeat of Ebiḫ at the hands of the goddess Inanna is described in the myth Inanna and Ebiḫ. Various interpretations of the narrative have been advanced, with individual authors seeing it as royal propaganda of the Akkadian empire, as a critique of its conquests, or as a narrative focused on typical literary motifs, lacking political undertones. Possible references to Ebiḫ's defeat have been identified in other literary compositions, in god lists, and on cylinder seals.

== Name and character ==
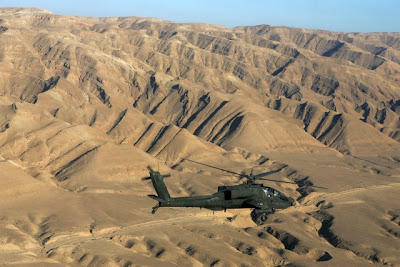
A modern photo of the Hamrin range in Iraq, identified with Ebiḫ.

The theonym Ebiḫ could be also spelled as Ebeḫ and Abiḫ. A further uncertain variant might be Abiḫe, an element attested in Hurrian theophoric names. The breve is sometimes omitted in transcription. A logographic writing is also attested, ^{d}EN.TI. Antoine Cavigneaux and Manfred Krebernik suggest that it can be read phonetically as Enti. However, it is to be distinguished from one of the names of Enki, also written as ^{d}En-ti, presumably meant to mirror the goddess Ninti. Ebiḫ's name could be preceded by the dingir sign, used to designate deities, or by the word kur, "mountain".

Wilfred G. Lambert has argued that unlike most other deities belonging to the Mesopotamian pantheon, Ebiḫ cannot be distinguished from the topographical feature he was associated with. He is typically identified by Assyriologists with the Hamrin Mountains, located in Iraq between Diyala and Lower Zab, in the proximity of the ancient city of Assur. It has been noted that the worship of specific mountains as deities, while widespread for example among Hurrians and Hittites, was not common in Mesopotamian religion. The character of mountain gods could be contrasted with other members of the pantheon, and they could be described as rebellious, as attested for Ebiḫ, or in some cases as cannibalistic. Mountainous areas were associated with calamity and external enemies, regarded as barbarians.

Anna Perdibon notes that in literary context, Ebiḫ is described as possessing human-like and natural features, and that both types of descriptions seemed to coexist. While known sources do not specify in which form he was worshiped, it has been suggested that he might have been represented as non-anthropomorphic. Another proposal is that mountain gods were depicted as anthropomorphic figures with scaled lower bodies, with an example found in Assur possibly specifically representing Ebiḫ, though the interpretation is not certain. Frans Wiggermann suggests that descriptions of figures of deities with scales (quliptu) reflect this iconographic type and designate a mountain-like appearance.

Attested epithets of Ebiḫ include šadû dannu ("strong mountain") and sikur māti ("bolt of the country").

== Worship ==
In sources from between the Early Dynastic and Old Babylonian periods, Ebiḫ is attested in theophoric names, most of which are linguistically Semitic and belonged to inhabitants of the Diyala area and Nuzi. Examples include Ir’e-Abiḫ ("Ebiḫ shepherded"), Ur-Abiḫ ("hero of Ebiḫ"), Puzur-Ebiḫ ("under the protection of Ebiḫ") and Abiḫ-il ("Ebiḫ is my god"; known from Mari). Last known names invoking him come from the Middle Assyrian period, and include Ebiḫ-nāṣir and Ebiḫ-nīrāri, with the theonym written logographically as ^{d}EN.TI in both cases. They can be translated as "Ebiḫ protects" and "Ebiḫ assists", respectively.

The worship of Ebiḫ is also attested in Neo-Assyrian sources. They indicate that he received offerings in various shrines in Assur. He appears in the Tākultu ritual from the reign of Sennacherib, where he is listed thrice, twice as a deity and once as a mountain. He is also invoked four times in an analogous text from the reign of Ashurbanipal, and only once, as a mountain rather than a personified god, in the Ashur-etil-ilani version.

In lower Mesopotamia, Ebiḫ is attested as the very last entry in the Nippur god list, though his name is not present in all of the known copies. He is also mentioned in a number of copies of the Weidner god list from the same period. A later Assyrian version with additional columns (tablet KAV 63) equates him with Adad.

== Inanna and Ebiḫ ==
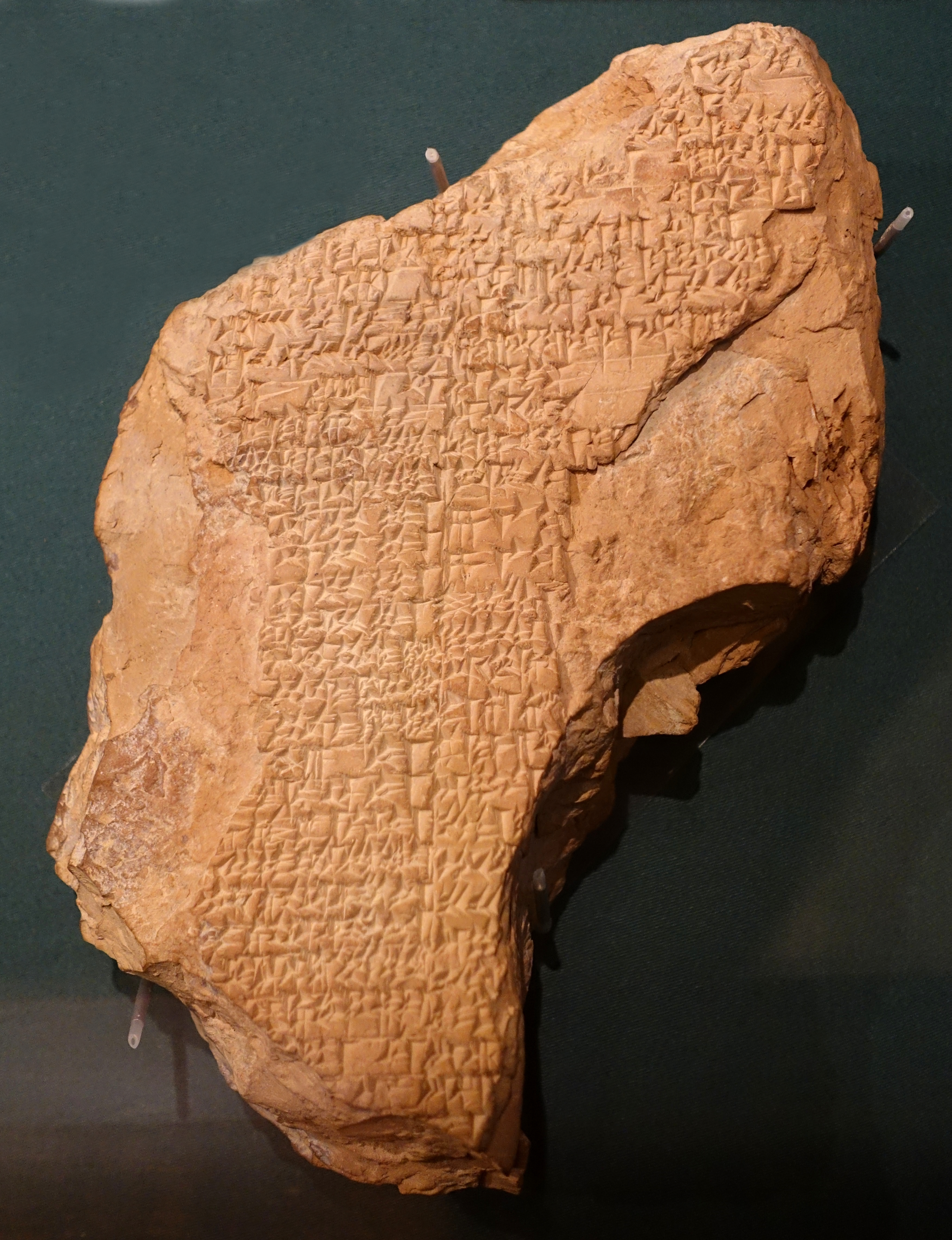
A copy of Inanna and Ebiḫ from the collection of the Oriental Institute of the University of Chicago

Ebiḫ appears in a myth referred to as Inanna and Ebiḫ in modern literature. It was originally transmitted under the incipit In-nin_{9}-me-ḫuš-a. As many as eighty individual copies are presently known. It has been proposed that it belonged to the so-called "Decad", a selection of texts which might have formed a section of the curriculum of scribal schools. Its authorship is sometimes attributed to Enheduanna.

The narrative describes Ebiḫ both as a personified deity and as a topographical feature. Inanna, presented in her warlike aspects, wants to confront him because he failed to show respect to her, but the sky god An tries to dissuade her, arguing that the mountain is both too formidable and too verdant to be opposed. The response angers her, and she leaves to fight before An finishes speaking. While the description of the battle includes phrases used to describe killing a person (Inanna grasps Ebiḫ's neck and stabs his heart with a dagger), it also contains references to natural features covering the mountain, such as forests, and his body is said to consist of rocks functioning as flesh. The text ends with a brief doxology, which praises Inanna for destroying Ebiḫ.

=== Interpretation ===
Due to Ebiḫ representing a real, rather than mythical, location, authors such as Claus Wilcke and Annette Zgoll assume that the myth might have had a political dimension, and that it either served as a work of royal propaganda celebrating northern conquests of the Akkadian Empire, or criticized it, perhaps due to the military campaigns creating the need for conscription and resulting in heavy losses. This view has been rejected by Jerrold Cooper, who points out examples of works with a political message, such as Curse of Agade and Lamentation over the Destruction of Sumer and Ur, are known to researchers, and unlike Inanna and Ebiḫ typically mention specific rulers by name; at the same time, the characterization of Inanna is consistent with other works of Sumerian literature, which according to him makes it unnecessary to seek a specific political motivation in Inanna and Ebiḫ. Paul Delnero points out that An's critical response, used to support the view that the myth was a criticism of Akkadian campaigns, finds a close parallel in the composition Gilgamesh and the Bull of Heaven, and is therefore unlikely to have such a meaning. Interpretations of the composition treating it as a political allegory critical of the Akkadian Empire have also been negatively evaluated by Aage Westenholz. He argues that the myth reflects a positive perception of Inanna, and points out the existence of cylinder seals depicting the goddess triumphing over a figure interpreted as a mountain god, which according to him might indicate the existence of a belief that as long as she kept the mountain deities at bay, Mesopotamia would remain prosperous. Jeremy Black notes that Inanna and Ebiḫ is an example of a myth according to which "there is always the comfort that the gods of Sumer will prevail and order will return" after periods of calamity.

=== Influence ===
Ebiḫ's defeat is directly mentioned in the hymn Inanna C. According to Claus Wilcke, possible references to the battle, or at least to conflict between Inanna and another mountain or mountains, can also be found in the composition Ninmesharra and in a hymn preserved on the tablets KAR 306 and KAR 331. Possible depictions of the battle have been identified on cylinder seals as well, though it is possible that they are not directly related, and battles between mountains and Inanna were a well established motif in Mesopotamian culture of the Akkadian period.

Jeremiah Peterson considers it possible that Ebiḫ's placement in the Nippur god list, where he is the last of the deities mentioned, might have been influenced by the tradition about his defeat at the hands of Inanna. Antoine Cavigneaux and Manfred Krebernik have also suggested that one of Inanna's epithets, Ninintina ("lady of warriorship"; derived from the word enti), known from the god list An = Anum (tablet IV, line 23) and its Old Babylonian forerunner, might have been related to the Ebiḫ myth due to its similarity to a presumed variant name of the mountain god, Enti.
