= Correspondence of the Kings of Ur =

The Correspondence of the Kings of Ur (CKU), also known as the Royal Correspondence of Ur, is a collection of 24 literary letters written in the Sumerian language and attributed to kings of the Ur III period, 2048–1940 BCE (2112–2004 middle chronology). They are known primarily from copies dating to the Old Babylonian period, ca. 1800–1600 BCE; their original date of composition and their historical accuracy are debated.

== Copies of the letters ==
The CKU letters are known only through copies written on clay tablets as school exercises by students learning to write cuneiform. All but one of the known copies have been dated to the Old Babylonian period, and were found in cities of Mesopotamia or the broader Near East, including Nippur, Ur, Isin, Uruk, Kish, Sippar, and Susa. A single tablet bearing copies of two of the letters and dating to the Middle Babylonian period was also found at Susa. About 115 cuneiform tablets bearing copies of one or more CKU letters are currently known.

== Content and structure ==
The CKU letters are written in a literary style of Sumerian prose. They loosely conform to the following structure:

- Address formula: "Speak to [RECIPIENT], saying (the words of) [ADDRESSOR]:"
- Argument
- Salutation
- Closing formulas
  - In letters to the king: "Now my king is informed (about all this)" and/or "whatever my king orders me, I will do".
  - In letters from the king: "it is urgent".

Most of the letters are presented as an exchange between a king of the Ur III dynasty and one of his officials (some of whom are known historical figures, e.g., the general Aradmu and later king of Isin Išbi-Erra), usually discussing matters of state or administration. Some of the topics include: difficulties in dealing with particular officials, the building and repair of fortifications, reports about securing the provinces and the completion of other assignments, and accusations of disloyalty or injustice directed towards other officials.

== List of letters ==
=== Letters addressed to and from Šulgi ===
1. Aradmu to Šulgi 1
1a. Aradmu to Šulgi 1a
2. Šulgi to Aradmu 1
3. Aradmu to Šulgi 2
4. Abaindasa to Šulgi 1
5. Šulgi to Aradmu 2
6. Šulgi to Aradmu 3
7. Aradmu to Šulgi 3
8. Aradmu to Šulgi 4
9. Aradmu to Šulgi 5
10. Aradmu to Šulgi 6
11. Urdun to Šulgi 1
12. Aradmu(?) to Šulgi(?) 7
13. Puzur-Šulgi to Šulgi 1
14. Šulgi to Puzur-Šulgi I
15. Šulgi to Išbi-Erra 1

=== Letters between Šulgi and Amar-Sin ===
16. Amar-Sin to Šulgi 1
17. Šulgi to Amar-Sin

=== Letters addressed to and from Šu-Sin ===
18. Šarrum-bani to Šu-Sin
19. Šu-Sin to Šarrum-bani 1
20. Šu-Sin to Lu-Nanna and Šarrum-bani 1

=== Letters addressed to and from Ibbi-Sin ===
21. Išbi-Erra to Ibbi-Sin 1
22. Ibbi-Sin to Išbi-Erra 1
23. Puzur-Numušda to Ibbi-Sin 1
24. Ibbi-Sin to Puzur-Numušda 1

== Controversy about historicity of the letters ==
The historical authenticity of the Correspondence of the Kings of Ur – the question of whether they originally date, as they purport, to the Ur III period, or whether they were composed during Old Babylonian compositions – is a highly contested and complicated issue. For many years, the letters were treated as one of the best sources of information for reconstructing political events of the Ur III period, especially the end of the kingdom. The modernistic account of the end of the Ur III dynasty, for example (catastrophic collapse due to factors such as Amorite invasions, environmental disasters and crop failures, and the rise of bloated bureaucracy), is largely based on CKU.

However, the historicity of the letters has recently been called into question, sparking at times intense debate among scholars. In 2001, Fabienne Huber published an article entitled "La Correspondance Royale d’Ur, un corpus apocryphe", in which she argued that the corpus was entirely apocryphal. This argument was based primarily on the occurrence of post-Ur III linguistic features, of borrowings between the letters, and of post-Ur III personal names and place names. In response to Huber's article, W. W. Hallo wrote a defense of the CKU's authenticity, arguing that nearly all of the letters were copied from Ur III archival letters and can be used as historical sources. Piotr Michalowski, in his 2011 publication of the entire CKU, presented an argument against both viewpoints.

Instead, he took the position that some elements of authentic Ur III letters were incorporated into the Old Babylonian curriculum, but that these were extensively redacted; in some cases it is possible to tell that a letter was fabricated, while in others, it is more likely that the core of the letter represents original Ur III content. In a review of Michalowski's book, Pascal Attinger defended Huber's position against Michalowski's critiques.
