= The Oak and the Reed =

Aesop's fable

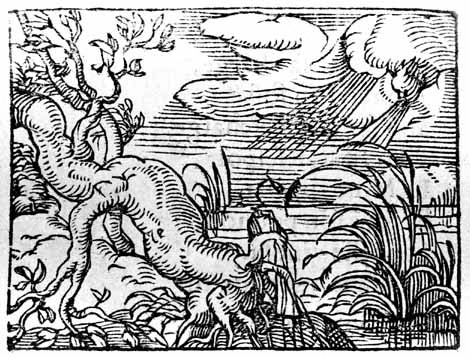
Bernard Salomon's woodcut of "The olive tree and the reed" from a French collection of Aesop's Fables in rhyme

The Oak and the Reed is one of Aesop's Fables and is numbered 70 in the Perry Index. It appears in many versions: in some it is with many reeds that the oak converses and in a late rewritten version it disputes with a willow.

== The story and its variants ==
There are early Greek versions of this fable and a 5th-century Latin version by Avianus. They deal with the contrasting behaviour of the oak, which trusts in its strength to withstand the storm and is blown over, and the reed that 'bends with the wind' and so survives. Most early sources see it as a parable about pride and humility, providing advice on how to survive in turbulent times. This in turn gave rise to various proverbs such as 'Better bend than break' and 'A reed before the wind lives on, while mighty oaks do fall', the earliest occurrence of which is in Geoffrey Chaucer's Troilus and Criseyde (II.1387–1389).

Aesop's Oak and the Reed has notable similarities with Mesopotamian disputation poems, especially those that feature disputes between trees (a recurring theme). Examples include the Sumerian Debate between tree and reed and the Akkadian Tamarisk and Palm. There are, however, some important genre differences between these disputation texts and the Oak and Reed, insofar as the former lack narrative dialogue and principally focus on the back-and-forth speech between the two interlocutors.

There is also an overlap here with ancient Eastern proverbs. In its Chinese form, 'A tree that is unbending is easily broken', it is found in the religious classic, the Tao Te Ching, with the commentary that 'The hard and strong will fall, the soft and weak will overcome'. A similar contrast, though involving a tree of a different kind, occurs in the Jewish Talmud and is commemorated on the 2016 "Parables of the Sages" series of postage stamps from Israel. Old sources quote a sermon by Simeon ben Eleazar, who cites the proverb "May a man be flexible like a reed and not rigid like a cedar". He then goes on to explain in the same terms as the Greek fable that, where a reed bends before the wind, the obstinate cedar is uprooted in the gale.

Another Greek variant of the fable had substituted an olive tree for the oak. Though the tree taunts the reed for its frailty and yielding to every wind, the reed does not answer back. The wisdom of its behaviour becomes apparent when the tree is snapped in the buffeting of a storm. This was the version preferred by a group of 16th century fabulists who included the French author Gilles Corrozet (1547) and two Italians, Gabriele Faerno (1564) and Giovanni Maria Verdizotti. In Heinrich Steinhowel's 1479 edition of the fables a fir tree (tanne, Latin abies in bilingual editions) is the protagonist. This suggests that the fable has become confused with that of The Fir and the Bramble, in which another tree that trusts in its superior qualities is bested. However, that too appears independently in Steinhowel's collection as "The Thornbush and the Fir" (Der Dornbusch und die Tanne). Ultimately all these versions refer back to the ancient genre of Near Eastern dispute poems which also included the tamarisk and the palm as disputants, and the poplar and the laurel.

Among other Renaissance variants may be included the ash and the reed in the emblem book of Hadrianus Junius (1567), which cites the same situation as an example of "the patience of the triumphant mind" (l'équité de l'esprit victorieuse). Laurentius Abstemius had earlier written his own variant in his Hecatomythium (1490) concerning an elm and willow (de ulmo et silere) in which the former's roots are undermined by the stream until it topples in, which points the same lesson that those who "give way to powerful people are wiser than those who suffer a shameful defeat by trying to resist".

== Later interpretations ==
When the fable figured in 16th century emblem books, more emphasis was put on the moral lesson to be learned, to which the story acted as a mere appendage. Thus Hadrianus Junius tells the fable in a four-line Latin poem and follows it with a lengthy commentary, part of which reads: "By contrast we see the reed obstinately holding out against the power of cloudy storms, and overcoming the onrush of the skies, its salvation lying in no other protection than a modicum of patience. It is just the same in the case of a just and balanced spirit, which cares not for invincible strength and defeats malice and other evils by patient endurance, and achieves great riches by the acquisition of undying glory—whereas boldness more often than not has its downfall." Geoffrey Whitney borrowed Hadrianus's illustration for his own Choice of Emblemes (1586), devoting one stanza of his poem to the fable and the second to its lesson:

When Envie, Hate, Contempte, and Slaunder, rage:
Which are the stormes and tempestes of this life;
With patience then, wee must the combat wage,
And not with force resist their deadlie strife:

But suffer still, and then wee shall, in fine,
Our foes subdue, when they with shame shall pine.

Only an allusion to the fable appeared in the Cent emblemes chrestiens (100 Christian emblems) of Georgette de Montenay. But the context in which the artist has placed his illustration is the verse from the Magnificat, "[God] hath put down the mighty from their seats and exalted them of low degree" (Luke 1.52).

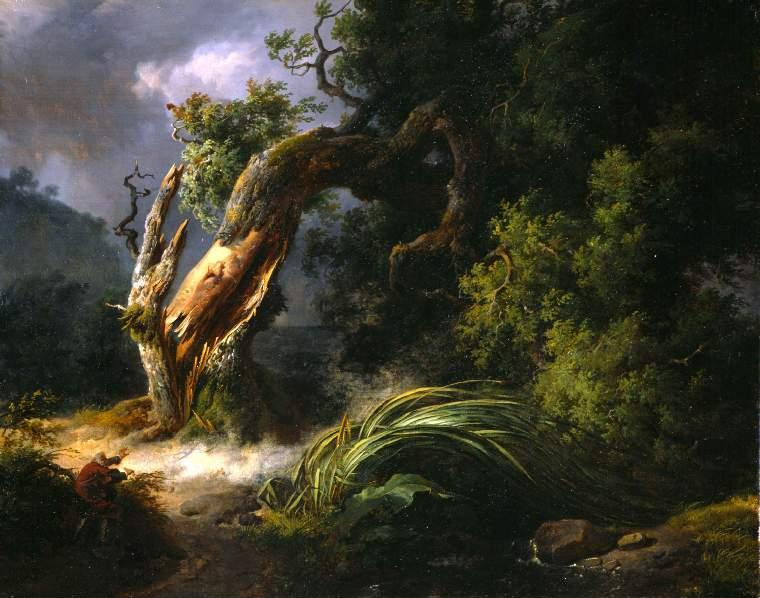
Achille Michallon's use of the fable refers to the fall of dynasties

Interpretations of the fable began to change after the more nuanced retelling in La Fontaine's Fables, Le chêne et le roseau (I.22). Here the oak has compassion on the reed's fragility and offers it protection, to which the reed politely replies that it has its own strategy for survival, "I bend and do not break". This is then put to the test when a storm breaks and brings the oak's "head that was neighbour to the sky" on a level with the roots "that touched the empire of the dead". Written in the autocratic time of Louis XIV of France, this was so successfully achieved that it appeared to teach the value of humility at the same time as suggesting that rulers may not be as powerful as they think themselves. So current did that sly interpretation become that Achille Etna Michallon's later painting of "The Oak and the Reed", now in the Fitzwilliam Museum (1816, see left), could easily be seen as a reference to the recent fall of the Emperor Napoleon I.

In democratic times, the conduct of the reed came to be seen as cowardly and self-serving and the fable began to be rewritten from this point of view. In Robert Dodsley's collection of 1761 it appears as "The Oak and the Willow", in which the willow challenges the oak to a trial of strength in withstanding a storm. The oak puts up a heroic fight and, after it falls, condemns the willow's conduct as mean and cowardly. An 1802 American rhymed version of this draws the political conclusion even more strongly. Set "within the commonwealth of trees", it presents the two trees as sharing in its government. When a storm "threatens the constitution of the state", the willow cringes acquiescently while the oak goes down fighting, but will not acknowledge the willow as the ultimate victor.

I am an Oak, tho' fall'n indeed!
Thou still a vile and skulking weed,
Rais'd by no merit of thine own,
But by the blast that laid me prone.
Say, if thou canst, what plant or tree,
Except a sycophant like thee,
Devoted to intrigue and strife,
Who'd e'er prefer a dastard's life,
Preserv'd by guile and crafty saws,
To falling in a GLORIOUS CAUSE?

Much the same point was made in Jean Anouilh's reinterpretation of the story in 1962. There the oak asks the reed if it doesn't find La Fontaine's fable morally detestable. The reed's answer is that the limited concerns of 'we little folk' will see them better through testing times than taking the moral high ground. When once again the oak falls in the storm, the reed jeeringly asks if he had not foreseen the outcome correctly. The tree's answer to the reed's envious hatred is simply, 'But I am still an oak'. This stems from the thinking behind another ancient emblem that appeared among the Emblesmes of Hadrianus Junius (1567). Placed before a version of "The oak and the reed" (which is there told of a rowan), it pictures an oak whose branches are stripped by a gale and has the title "The disasters of princes are unlike those of ordinary folk". It is accompanied by a quatrain that concludes "The prince disaster has impoverished/ Retains the honour of his lineage." Nobility of character too is the equal of high parentage.

The fable has proved popular with Russian poets, with Alexander Sumarokov (1762), Yury Neledinsky-Meletsky, Yakov Knyazhnin (1787), Ivan Dmitriev (1795), Dmitry Khvostov (1802), Ivan Krylov (1805) and Alexei Zilov (1833) having all published translations of La Fontaine's variant. Another fable by Khvostov, "The Wind and the Oak" (1816), is applied to recent political conditions. There the wind's demand for the oak to bow, and the oak's inability to do so despite being stripped of leaf and branch, is compared to Napoleon's demand that Kutuzov capitulate to him. Vasily Maslovich published two shortened variations (one from the mid-1810s, one from the mid-1820s) with the moral that a woman must obey her husband. In Alexander Benitsky's "The Cedar and the Willow" (1809), the fallen cedar is mocked by the willow for ignoring its advice to bow, to which the tree replies that a dishonorable life might be saved through dishonor, but all the wind has achieved against itself is the gloryless victory of breaking a tree weakened by age after it has lived without bowing far longer than willows ever do. In Fyodor Ivanov's "The Oak, the Bushes and the Reed" (1808), the debate is between the reed and the bushes growing around the oak, who boast of enjoying the protection offered by it as in La Fontaine's version. At the end, however, they are buried by the oak's fall while the remote reed survives.

== Artistic interpretations ==
Since this is one of the rare fables without human or animal characters, the subject has been a gift to artists and illustrators. From the earliest printed editions, the makers of woodcuts have taken pleasure in contrasting diagonals with the verticals and horizontals of the picture space, as well as the textures of the pliable reed and the sturdy tree trunk. Among 16th century emblem-makers there was even a prescription for how the scene should be presented. According to Hadrianus Junius (1565), 'The way the picture should be drawn is straightforward: in it, one of the winds is blowing with puffed-out cheeks, breaking up the huge trees in its way, pulling them up, uprooting them and flinging them around; but a patch of reeds survives unscathed.' Other contemporary examples of this approach are in Bernard Salomon's illustration in Les Fables d'Esope Phrygien (1554, see above) and the Latin poems of Hieronymus Osius (1564).

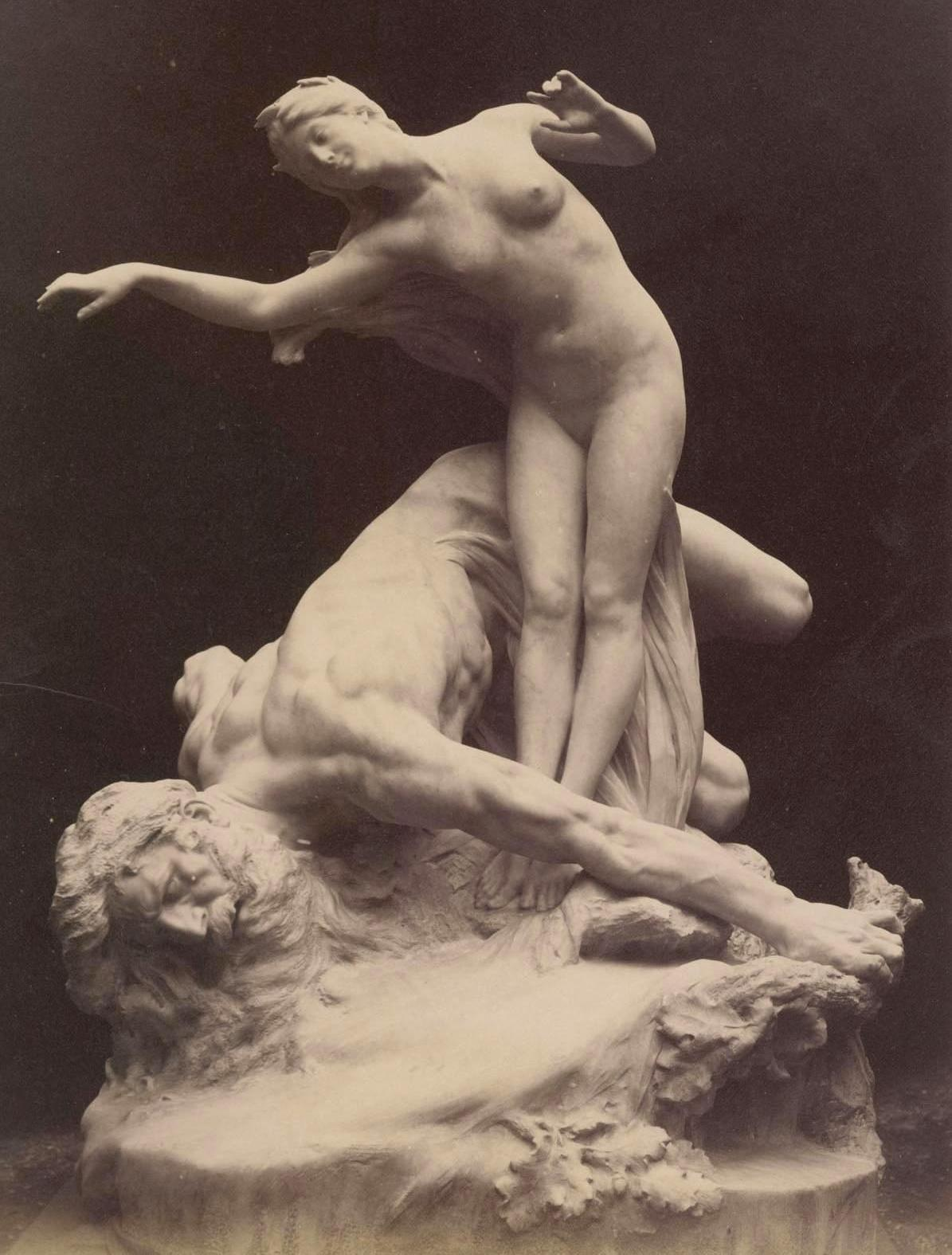
Henri Coutheillas's sculpture of the fable

Some variations depend on the version of the fable that is being recorded. In the version by Samuel Croxall (1732), which was widely followed, the uprooted oak is floating downstream and enquires of a reed how it has survived the storm. In George Fyler Townsend's new translation (1867), the oak has fallen across a stream and asks the same question of the reeds there. But in John Ogilby's telling, the fable's meaning has a contextual undercurrent. His oak has been brought down by a conspiracy of all the winds and is asking for advice of a surviving reed. The moral drawn from its advice absolves the royalists in Restoration England of any blame for following it:

Madmen against a violent Torrent row.
Thou mayst hereafter serve the Common-weal.

With the growing interest in landscape art, many French artists availed themselves of the fable's dramatic possibilities, including the illustrator Gustave Doré, who made two different woodcuts of a peasant struggling through stormy landscapes and another of a horseman unseated by the falling oak. Achille Michallon's landscape of 1816 (of which there is also a black-and-white print) is said to be inspired by the style of Jacob Ruisdael, but it also has aspects of the dramatic landscapes of French Romanticism. Later examples of this include treatments of the fable by Guillaume Alphonse Harang (1814–1884) and François Ignace Bonhommé (1809–1893), both dating from 1837. Jules Coignet's picturesque treatment in the Musée Jean de La Fontaine, also dating from the second quarter of the 19th century, is a study of different textures of light as it falls on the windswept reeds and the foliage of the fallen oak. This is dramatised even further in the Japanese woodcut version of the fable by Kajita Hanko, published at the end of the century in the Choix de Fables de La Fontaine, Illustrée par un Groupe des Meilleurs Artistes de Tokio (1894), which has an olive rather than an oak as subject. Contrasting light effects are equally the subject of Henri Harpignies's sombrely coloured drawing in the Musée Jean de La Fontaine and of the watercolour painted by Gustave Moreau about 1880.

The turn of the century saw a statue of the subject by Henri Coutheillas exhibited in Paris. It is now in the Jardin d'Orsay in Limoges and contrasts a swaying female nude with the grizzled giant who tumbles at her feet as he clutches a broken branch in his hand. During the 20th century there were a number of prints made by prominent artists. They include Marc Chagall's etching from his La Fontaine series (1952), Roland Oudot's coloured woodcut (1961) and Salvador Dalí's coloured print of 1974.

== Musical Versions ==
In the 19th century, the singer Pauline Viardot set La Fontaine's fable for piano and soprano and was accompanied by Frédéric Chopin in the concert they shared in 1842. The French fable was next set in 1901 by Jacques Soulacroix (1863–1937). In 1964 a Czech translation by Pavel Jurkovic was set for mixed choir and orchestra by Ilja Hurník as part of his Ezop, and in 1965 a poetic version by Peter Westmore was included as the last piece in Songs from Aesop's Fables for children's voices and piano by Edward Hughes (1930–1998). A purely musical interpretation of the fable appeared in Michael Galasso's incidental music for the segment based on the fable in Robert Wilson's production of Les Fables de La Fontaine for the Comédie-Française (2004). The piece was included in Annie Sellem's composite project Les Fables à La Fontaine as well as performed separately and is one of the four segments from the production included in the film Les Fables à La Fontaine (2004) directed by Marie-Hélène Rebois. La Fontaine's text is additionally the basis of the tenth piece in Eh bien ! Dansez maintenant (2006), Vladimir Cosma's light-hearted interpretation for narrator and orchestra in the style of an 'undulating waltz'.

During the 20th century there was a fashion for slang versions. One of the first appeared among the seven published in 1945 by Bernard Gelval which afterwards became part of the sung repertoire of the actor Yves Deniaud. It was followed in 1947 by the second volume of 15 fables célèbres racontées en argot (famous fables in slang) by 'Marcus', in which Le Chêne et le Roseau was included. While this keeps fairly closely to La Fontaine's text, Pierre Perret's 1990 rap version is a looser adaptation of the fable into a series of quatrains with a refrain in between. The mighty oak 'stacked like the Himalayas' talks down to the reed in its marsh where 'up there the winds whizz and down 'ere's rheumatiz' (En haut t'as le mistral en bas les rhumatismes) but his pity is rejected and the fate soon to overtake him foretold. Cartoons were eventually made of these versions and released on DVD under the title The Geometric Fables; "The oak and the reed" appeared in volume 3 of the series (Les Chiffres, 1991).

Two groups from Quebec have made use of the fable more recently. The deathcore band Despised Icon recorded their version on the album Consumed by your Poison in 2002. The grunted lyrics parallel La Fontaine's narrative: the reed rejects the protection offered by the oak for its own pliable behaviour. After the storm 'The one who thought himself so strong now among the dead belongs' (Celui qui se croyait si fort réside maintenant parmi les morts). There is also a folk-rock adaptation by Les Cowboys Fringants recorded on their 2008 album L'Expédition. The lyrics emphasise how holding to one's point of view isolates individuals but seem to recommend the reed's strategy for survival in the words of the refrain that one must 'fall to rise again' (tomber pour se relever) repeatedly. There was also a hip hop dance version of the fable in France choreographed for three performers by Mourad Merzouki in 2002.

== Additional sources ==
- Ceccarelli, Manuel (2020). "An Introduction to the Sumerian School Disputes: Subject, Structure, Function and Context". In Jimenez, Enrique; Mittermayer, Catherine (eds.). Disputation Literature in the Near East and Beyond. De Gruyter. pp. 33–56. ISBN 978-1-5015-1021-2.
- West, M.L. (2013). Hellenica: Volume III: Philosophy, Music and Metre, Literary Byways, Varia. Oxford University Press. ISBN 978-0-19-960503-3.
