= Debate between tree and reed =

Sumerian disputation text

The Debate between tree and reed (CSL 5.3.4) is a work of Sumerian literature belonging to the genre of disputations poem. It was written on clay tablets and dates to the Third Dynasty of Ur (ca. mid-3rd millennium BC). The text was reconstructed by M. Civil in the 1960s from 24 manuscripts but it is currently the least studied of the disputation poems and a full translation has not yet been published. Some other Sumerian disputations include the dispute between bird and fish, cattle and grain, and Summer and Winter.

== Synopsis ==
The poem begins with a cosmogonic prologue describing the copulation between Heaven (An) and Earth (Ki). Earth gives birth to vegetation, and for the purpose of the poem, this prominently includes Tree and Reed. Though they are first in harmony, a disputation begins between the two as they enter into a shrine. Reed, who fails to respect the proper order of things, steps in front of Tree, causing the latter to be infuriated. The prologue covers the first 49 lines, after which the disputation proceeds for another two hundred lines. It is divided into four speeches: Tree speaking (lines 50–91), Reed speaking (96–137), Tree speaking again (144–191), Reed speaking again (197–228). The adjudication scene (230–254) begins with Tree invoking the judgement of Shulgi (a king), who declares that Tree has prevailed over Reed. The poem also mentions the king Puzrish-Dagan, suggesting its composition during his time.

== Partial translation ==
The following translation of the introductory cosmogonic section of the Disputation, containing only the first 10 lines, is taken from Lisman 2013. The first 25 lines were published by Van Dijk in 1965 but a translation of the entire text has still not been made.

1 The large surface of the earth introduced herself; then she has embellished herself as with a bardul-garment.

2 The vast earth has filled her exterior with precious metals and lapis lazuli.

3 With diorite, nir-stone, cornelian, and suduaga she has adorned herself.

4 The earth, the fragrant vegetation, covered herself with attractiveness. She stood in her magnificence.

5 The pure earth, the virgin earth, has beautified herself for the holy An.

6 An, the exalted heaven, had intercourse with the vast earth.

7 He poured the seed of the hero's Tree and Reed into her womb.

8 The whole earth, the fecund cow, took the good seed of An under her care.

9 The earth, life-giving vegetation, innerly happy, devoted herself to the production of it (i.e. the vegetation).

10 The earth, full of joy, bore abundance, while juice and syrup gave out their smell.

== Historical context ==
In Mesopotamian disputation literature, debates between trees is a recurring theme. In Akkadian disputations, examples include the Tamarisk and Palm, Palm and Vine, and Series of the Poplar. A much later example from Aesop's fables is The Oak and the Reed.
