= Debate between the hoe and the plough =

Sumerian disputation text

The Debate between the hoe and the plough (CSL 5.3.1) is a work of Sumerian literature and one of the six extant works belonging to this literature's genre of disputations poem. It was written on clay tablets and dates to the Third Dynasty of Ur (ca. mid-3rd millennium BC) and runs 196 lines in length. The text was reconstructed by M. Civil in the 1960s. The two protagonists, as in other disputation poems, are two inanimate things: in this case, two pieces of agricultural equipment, the hoe and the plough. The debate is about which is the better tool.

The Hoe and Plough is (along with Sheep and Grain) the best attested of the disputation poems given its attestation from ~60 manuscripts, likely due to its integral place as part of the ancient Sumerian scribal curriculum especially at the city of Nippur where the overwhelming majority of the manuscripts are provenanced. An up-to-date list of the manuscripts of the text is provided by Attinger 2015.

This disputation is also the only of the six Sumerian disputations to lack a cosmogony in its prologue. In place of the cosmogony is a hymn or a series of epithets addressed to Hoe (such as "child of a poor man") covering the first 5 lines. The disputation itself begins when Hoe declares that "I want to dispute with Plow!" The dispute covers lines 9 to 187. Hoe speaks in lines 9–19, 67–187 and Plough speaks in lines 21–66. One argument Hoe cites is its ability to make bricks, repair walls and so forth; Plough cites its agricultural utility like for tasks such as sowing. The adjudication begins when the god Enlil spontaneously appears to render a verdict about the outcome—differing from other disputation poems where the adjudicator, a king or god, is specifically requested by one or both contenders. Enlil asks Hoe to calm down and cease his insults against Plough. The poem is concluded by a doxology where Hoe was ruled to be the winner. This accords to the normal pattern of disputation poems where the first character cast to argue also turns out as the winner. It is also common for the speaker with the longest arguments to win, as is the case here—in fact—one of the insults by Hoe against Plough is that Hoe is equipped to be used year-round, whereas Plough is only in use for one third of the year; as a reflection of this, Plough's speeches are only one-third the length of Hoe's speeches in the totality of the disputation.

The Hoe and the Plough, along with other Sumerian disputation poems, demonstrate the continuity of the genre at the time that disputation poems begin appearing in the Akkadian language. Notably, Hoe and Plough contains remarkable phraseological continuity with the Akkadian Palm and Vine, which is attested in manuscripts two millennia later (3rd century BC).

Miguel Civil has used the Hoe and Plough alongside the Sumerian Farmer's Instructions to produce a visual reconstruction of the Sumerian seed-plough, demonstrating the complexity of the tool.
