= Disputation =

Formal literature genre of scholarly debate

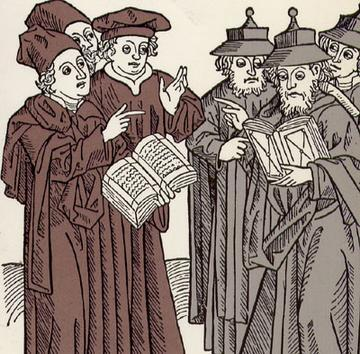
A disputation between Christian and Jewish scholars (1483)

Disputation is a genre of literature involving two contenders who seek to establish a resolution to a problem or establish the superiority of something. An example of the latter is in Sumerian disputation poems.

In the scholastic system of education of the Middle Ages, disputations (in Latin: disputationes, singular: disputatio) offered a formalized method of debate designed to uncover and establish truths in theology and in sciences. Fixed rules governed the process: they demanded dependence on traditional written authorities and the thorough understanding of each argument on each side.

== Mesopotamian disputations ==
In the ancient Near East, disputation was a popular genre of literature that went back at least to the mid-3rd millennium BC with the onset of Sumerian disputations, followed by the first Akkadian-language disputations which began in the 18th century BC. Sumerian and Akkadian language disputations had some discontinuity, insofar as different topics were discussed, different literary conventions were used, and none of the later Akkadian disputations appear to be translations of earlier Sumerian disputations. The two most well-attested Sumerian disputations are the Debate between the hoe and the plough and the Debate between sheep and grain.

== Syriac disputations ==
Many disputations were composed in the Syriac language, including the Dispute Between the Cherub and the Thief and the Dispute Between Heaven and Earth.

== Medieval disputations ==
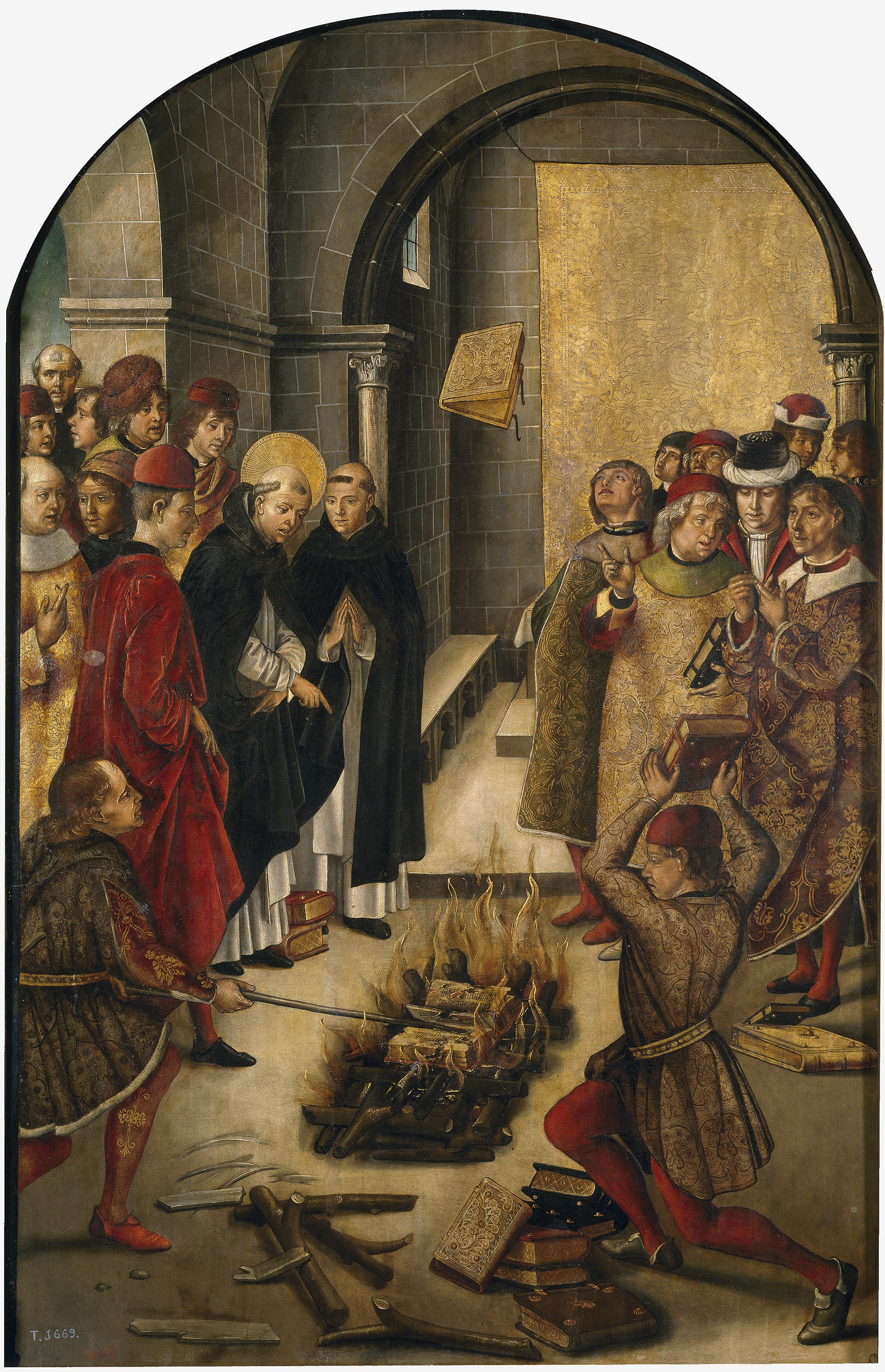
c. 1208. This 15th-century painting by Pedro Berruguete depicts the legend of Saint Dominic and his Albigensian disputant tossing their books into a fire. According to the legend, Saint Dominic's books miraculously leapt out of the fire.

A significant category of disputations took place between Christian and Jewish theologians as a form of both theological and philosophical debate and proselytization. Often, the Christian side was represented by a recent convert from Judaism. The only way for the Jewish side to 'win' was to force a draw by drawing the Christian side into a position in which it was necessary to deny the Old Testament to win, committing heresy. According to Michael J. Cook, "Since 'winning' a debate could well jeopardize the security of the Jewish community at large, political considerations certainly entered into what Jewish disputants publicly said or refrained from saying. ... Official transcripts of these proceedings, moreover, may not duplicate what actually transpired; in some places what they record was not the live action, as it were, but Christian polemical revision composed after the fact."

- 1240: the Disputation of Paris during the reign of Louis IX of France (St. Louis) between a member of the Franciscan Order Nicholas Donin, who earlier converted from Judaism and persuaded Pope Gregory IX to issue a bill ordering the burning of the Talmud, and four of the most distinguished rabbis of France: Yechiel of Paris, Moses of Coucy, Judah of Melun, and Samuel ben Solomon of Château-Thierry. The commission of Christian theologians condemned the Talmud to be burned and on June 17, 1244, twenty-four carriage loads of Jewish religious manuscripts were set on fire in the streets of Paris.
- 1263: the Disputation of Barcelona before King James I of Aragon: between the friar Pablo Christiani (a convert from Judaism) and Rabbi Moses ben Nachman (also known as Nachmanides). At the end of disputation, the king awarded Nachmanides a monetary prize and declared that never before had he heard "an unjust cause so nobly defended." Nevertheless, the Dominicans claimed the victory and Nachmanides was exiled and his report of the proceedings was condemned and burned. A committee appointed by the king censored the passages from the Talmud they deemed offensive.
- 1375: public disputations held at Burgos and Avila by Moses Cohen de Tordesillas with converts from Judaism John of Valladolid and Abner of Burgos. Another disputation was held at about the same time in Pamplona by Shem-Tob ben Isaac Shaprut of Tudela with Cardinal Don Pedro de Luna, afterward Avignon Pope Benedict XIII, the disputations being made the subjects of the books "'Ezer ha-Emunah" (by Moses) and "Eben Boḥan".
- 1413: the Disputation of Tortosa in Spain, staged by the Antipope Benedict XIII. As a result, the Pope gave instructions by which all books of the Talmud would be handed over to his functionaries for censorship.

Some disputations also appeared in the Islamic world, including one between a pen and a sword, attributed to Ahmad Ibn Burd al-Asghar in the 11th century.

== Emergence of Protestantism (1518–1550) ==
Martin Luther opened the Protestant Reformation by demanding a disputation upon his 95 theses, 31 October 1517. Although presented as a call to an ordinary scholastic dispute, there is no evidence that such an event ever took place.

=== Heidelberg Disputation (1518) ===
During a convention held at Heidelberg in April 1518, Luther directed a dispute on 28 theological and 12 philosophical theses. He was successful in winning over Johannes Brenz and the Dominican Martin Bucer.

=== Leipzig Disputation (1519) ===
Johann Eck became involved in a literary contest with Andreas Karlstadt and challenged his adversary to a public debate. In Leipzig, although the faculty of the university entered a protest, and the Bishops of Merseburg and Brandenburg launched prohibitions and an excommunication, the disputation took place under the ægis of Duke George of Saxony. Eck came to Leipzig with one attendant; Luther and Karlstadt entered the city accompanied by an army of adherents, mostly students. From 27 June to 4 July (1519) Eck and Karlstadt debated the subject of free will and our ability to cooperate with grace. Eck forced his antagonist to make admissions which stultified the new Lutheran doctrine, whereupon Luther himself came forward to assail the dogma of Roman supremacy by divine right. The debate on papal primacy was succeeded by discussions of purgatory, indulgences, penance, etc. On 14 and 15 July, Karlstadt resumed the debate on free will and good works. Finally, Duke George declared the disputation closed, and each of the contendents departed, as usual, claiming victory.

Of the two universities to which the final decision had been reserved, the University of Erfurt declined to intervene and returned the documents; the University of Paris sat in judgment upon Luther's writings, attaching to each of his opinions theological censure. Luther gained the support of Melanchthon.

The Leipzig Disputation was the last occasion on which the ancient custom of swearing to advance no tenet contrary to Catholic doctrine was observed. In all subsequent debates between Catholics and Protestants, the bare text of Holy Writ was taken as the authority. This placed the Catholics in a disadvantageous position. This was particularly the case in Switzerland, where Zwingli and his lieutenants organized a number of one-sided debates under the presidency of town councils already won over to Protestantism. Such were the disputations of Zurich, 1523, of Swiss Baden, 1526, and of Berne, 1528. In all of these the result was the abolition of Catholic worship and in their opinion the desecration of churches and religious institutions.

=== Diet of Regensburg (1541) ===
Emperor Charles V attempted to bring the religious troubles of Germany to a "speedy and peaceful termination" by conferences between the Catholic and the Protestant divines. The Protestants proclaimed their determination to adhere to the terms of the Augsburg Confession, and, in addition, formally repudiated the authority of the Roman pontiff and "would admit no other judge of the controversy than Jesus Christ"; both Pope Paul III and Luther predicted failure. However, since the emperor and his brother, King Ferdinand, persisted in making a trial, the pope authorized his nuncio, Giovanni Morone, to proceed to Speyer, whither the meeting had been summoned for June 1540. As the plague was raging in that city the conference took place in Hagenau. Neither the Elector of Saxony nor the Landgrave of Hesse could be induced to attend. Melanchthon was absent through illness. The leading Protestant theologians at the conference were Bucer, Brenz, Oswald Myconius, Ambrosius Blarer, and Urbanus Rhegius. The most prominent on the Catholic side were Johann Faber, Bishop of Vienna, and Eck. Present was John Calvin, then exiled from Geneva; he appeared as confidential agent of the King of France. After a month, King Ferdinand prorogued the conference to reassemble at Worms on 28 October.

Undismayed by the failure of the Hagenau conference, the emperor made more strenuous efforts for the success of the coming colloquy at Worms. He dispatched his minister Granvelle and Ortiz, his envoy, to the papal court. The latter brought with him the Jesuit Peter Faber. The pope sent the Bishop of Feltre, Tommaso Campeggio, brother of the cardinal, and ordered Morone to attend. They were not to take part in the debates, but were to watch events closely and report to Rome. Granvella opened the proceedings at Worms, 25 November, with an eloquent and conciliatory address. He pictured the evils which had befallen Germany, "once the first of all nations in fidelity, religion, piety, and divine worship", and warned his hearers that "all the evils that shall come upon you and your people, if, by clinging stubbornly to preconceived notions, you prevent a renewal of concord, will be ascribed to you as the authors of them." On behalf of the Protestants, Melanchthon returned "an intrepid answer"; he threw all the blame upon the Catholics, who refused to accept the new Gospel.

A great deal of time was spent in wrangling over points of order; finally it was decided that Eck should be spokesman for the Catholics and Melanchthon for the Protestants. The debate began 14 January 1541. The Augsburg Confession as the basis of the conference; the Augsburg Confession of 1540 was a different document from the Confession of 1530, having been changed by Melanchthon to suit his sacramentarian view of the Eucharist. Eck and Melanchthon battled four days over the topic of original sin and its consequences, and a formula was drafted to which both parties agreed, the Protestants with a reservation.

At this point Granvella suspended the conference, to be resumed at Regensburg, whither the emperor had summoned a diet, which he promised to attend in person. This diet, from which the emperor anticipated brilliant results, was called to order 5 April 1541. As legate of the pope appeared Cardinal Contarini, assisted by the nuncio Morone. Calvin was present, ostensibly to represent Lüneburg, in reality to foster discord in the interest of France. As collocutors at the religious conference which met simultaneously, Charles appointed Eck, Pflug, and Gropper for the Catholic side, and Melanchthon, Bucer, and Pistorius for the Protestants. A document of mysterious origin, the Regensburg Book, was presented by Joachim of Brandenburg as the basis of agreement. This compilation, it developed later, was the result of secret conferences, held during the meeting at Worms, between the Protestants, Bucer and Wolfgang Capito, on one side, and the Lutheranizing Gropper and a secretary of the emperor named Veltwick on the other. It consisted of twenty-three chapters, in which the attempt was made so to formulate the controverted doctrines that each party might find its own views therein expressed. How much Charles and Granvella had to do in the transaction, is unknown; they certainly knew and approved of it. The "Book" had been submitted by the Elector of Brandenburg to the judgment of Luther and Melanchthon; and their contemptuous treatment of it augured ill for its success.

When it was shown to the legate and Morone, the latter was for rejecting it summarily; Contarini, after making a score of emendations, notably emphasizing in Article 14 the dogma of Transubstantiation, declared that now "as a private person" he could accept it; but as legate he must consult with the Catholic theologians. Eck secured the substitution of a conciser exposition of the doctrine of justification. Thus emended, the "Book" was presented to the collocutors by Granvella for consideration. The first four articles, treating of man before the fall, free will, the origin of sin, and original sin, were accepted. The battle began in earnest when the fifth article, on justification, was reached. After long and vehement debates, a formula was presented by Bucer and accepted by the majority, so worded as to be capable of bearing a Catholic and a Lutheran interpretation. Naturally, it was unsatisfactory to both parties. The Holy See condemned it and administered a severe rebuke to Contarini for not protesting against it. No greater success was attained as to the other articles of importance.

On 22 May the conference ended, and the emperor was informed as to the articles agreed upon and those on which agreement was impossible. Charles was sorely disappointed, but he was powerless to effect anything further. The decree known as the Regensburg Interim, published 28 July 1541, enjoining upon both sides the observance of the articles agreed upon by the theologians, was by both sides disregarded.

Equally without result was the last of the conferences summoned by Charles at Regensburg, 1546, just prior to the outbreak of the Smalkaldic War.

=== Colloquy at Poissy (1561) ===
Aiming at a reconciliation between the Roman Catholics and Protestants (Huguenots) of France, the conference was opened on 9 September in the refectory of the convent of Poissy, with the eleven year old King Charles IX being present. It broke up inconclusively a month later, on 9 October, by which point the divide between the doctrines appeared irreconcilable.

== In fiction ==
- Umberto Eco (1980), The Name of the Rose. The plot features a disputation between the Franciscans and the Dominicans about the Church's wealth and if Jesus and the Apostles held any material possessions.
- Hyam Maccoby, The Disputation. A play dramatizing the Disputation of Barcelona in 1263. Adapted for television in 1986 by Channel 4, starring Christopher Lee, Bob Peck and Alan Dobie.

== See also ==
- Dialectic
- Dispute between a man and his Ba
- Dispute between bird and fish
- Polemic

== Notes and references ==
=== Sources ===
- Brock, Sebastian (1978). "A Syriac dispute between Heaven and Earth". Le Muséon. 91: 261–270.
- Brock, Sebastian (2002). "The Dispute Between the Cherub and the Thief". Hugoye: Journal of Syriac Studies. 5 (2): 1–13.
- Brock, Sebastian (2009). "The Dispute Poem: From Sumer to Syriac". Journal of the Canadian Society for Syriac Studies. 1 (1): 3–10.
- Brock, Sebastian (2020). "Disputations in Syriac Literature". In Jimenez, Enrique; Mittermayer, Catherine (eds.). Disputation Literature in the Near East and Beyond. De Gruyter. pp. 159–174. ISBN 978-1-5015-1021-2.
- Habib, Irfan (1997). Akbar and His India. New Delhi: Oxford University Press. ISBN 978-0-19-563791-5.
- Jimenez, Enrique (2017). The Babylonian Disputation Poems. Brill.
- Leppin, Volker; Wengert, Timothy J. (2015). "Sources for and against the Posting of the Ninety-Five Theses" (PDF). Lutheran Quarterly. 29: 373–398. Archived from the original (PDF) on 2016-03-26.
- Mittermayer, Catherine (2020). "The Sumerian Precedence Debates: The World's Oldest Rhetorical Exercises?". In Jimenez, Enrique; Mittermayer, Catherine (eds.). Disputation Literature in the Near East and Beyond. De Gruyter. pp. 11–32. ISBN 978-1-5015-1021-2.
