= TU-TA-TI scribe study tablets =

The Tu-Ta-Ti scribe study tablets are tablets written in Cuneiform found all over Mesopotamia, used for a diverse set of languages, along a vast timespan of periods, and over many different cultures. The text originated in materials created for the study of writing ancient Sumerian, the language for which Cuneiform, with its signs and sounds, was originally invented.

These tablets are part of the Cuneiform Syllabary B from the second millennium, texts made to teach reading and writing in the Sumerian language found in presumably private schools in residential areas of Nippur and Ur.

== Description ==
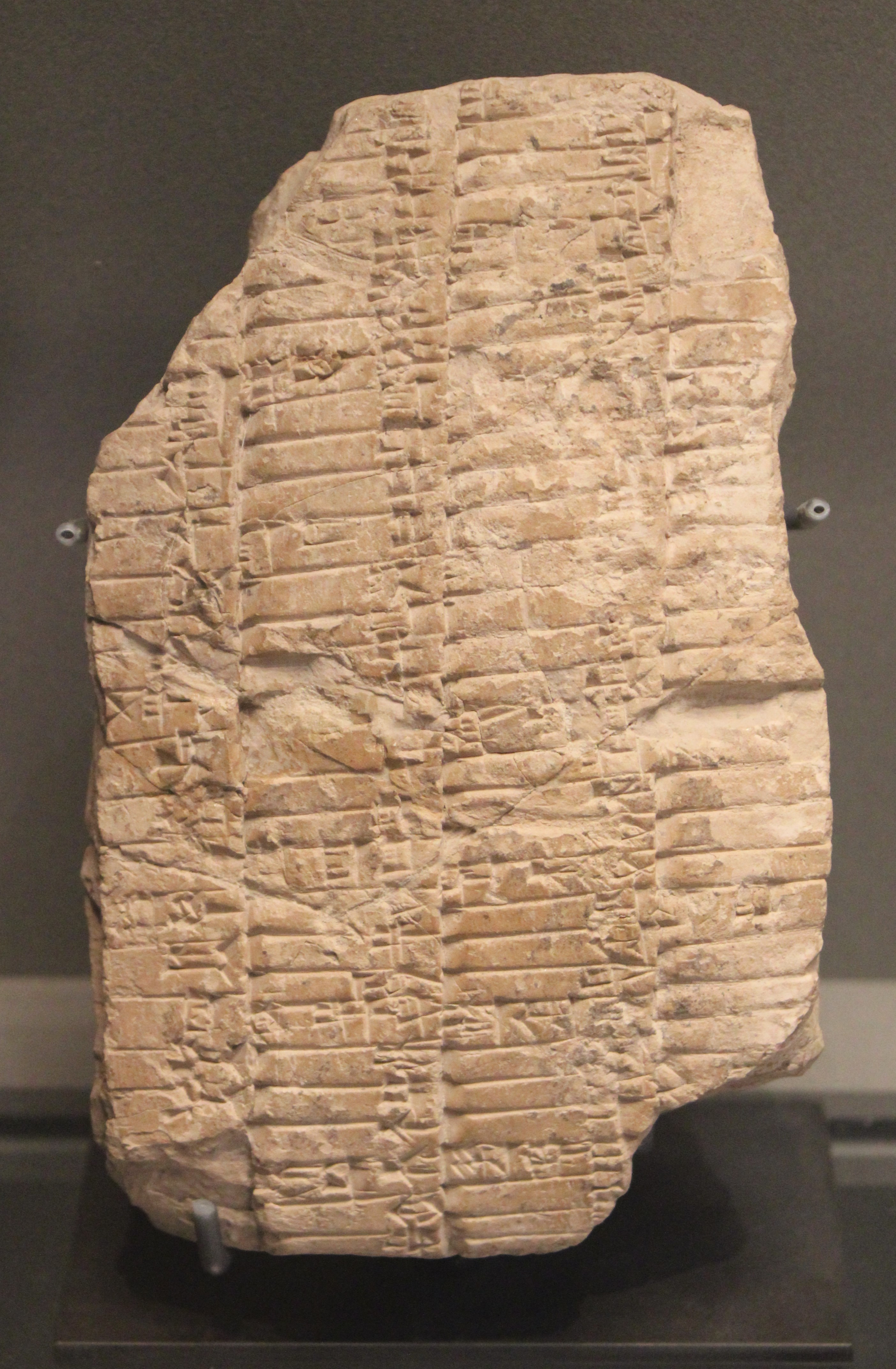
TA-TU-TI scribe study tablet Artifact AD AO 5399 now in the Louvre museum]. Original exact location unknown. Old Babylonian period, c. 1800-1700 BC.

Instructional tablets for teaching scribes have been found everywhere that Cuneiform was used. This "TU-TA-TI" text in particular has been found all over Mesopotamia, in Nippur, and many other places. Sadly, some of the tablets, such as the one found in the Louvre museum, were purchased without information about their origins.

The text originated in an ancient Sumerian reading and writing exercise, beginning with the signs TU, TA, and TI, and then "TU-TA-TI" - a word, possibly meaningless, built of these three signs, each representing a single syllable.

The signs are written in columns, each sign under the next and then the composite three-syllable "word".

After TU TA TI TUTATI comes NU NA NI NUNANI, and so forth, presumably to be read aloud in class while practicing writing. These tablets were divided in two, with the left side having the teacher's instructional text, while the right side was left blank for the student to practice, repeatedly writing and erasing it. This "TU-TA-TI" instructional text was studied in all the languages that used Cuneiform and found in the archaeological remnants of many cultures.

== Finding and deciphering ==
The artifact at the Louvre was purchased in 1910 by the archaeologist Elias Ibrahim Géjou. The original location of its finding is not known.

According to Steve Tinney from Penn Museum, the TU-TA-TI text, used for studying pronunciation, had more than 80 syllables and was followed by a list of names to read and write. All the artifacts of this text that have been found are broken fragments, so we cannot be sure.

== Text ==
The sequence, read downwards in columns, beginning with the top of the left column and going down, is a sequence of 3 syllables:

- A syllable with /u/.
- A syllable with /a/.
- A syllable with /i/.

After each sequence of three single syllables, containing the vowels /u/, /a/ and /i/, comes a three-syllable word with all three vowels.

For example: tu ta ti tu-ta-ti. nu na ni nu-na-ni. bu ba bi bu-ba-bi etc.

Towards the end of the list, there are several syllables with an added ending consonant. So at the bottom of the 2nd column for example we find:

- ur ar ir ur-ar-ir. tum tam tim tum-tam-tim. uš aš iš uš-aš-iš.

In Cuneiform transliteration, it is common to use the following signs for marking pronunciation:

- ʃ is marked as š
- ŋ is marked as g̃ or ŋ
- χ is marked as ḫ

=== Consonant sequences ===
The leftmost column has the following syllables (where V stands for the vowel /u/, /a/ or /i/:

- tV, nV, bV, zV, sV, ḫV, dV, rV, wV, kV

The second column to the left, read from top to bottom has the KU-KA-KI from the first column and then continues with L as follows:

- kV, lV, V, mV, šV, gV, g̃V, pV, _r, tVm

The third column begins with the ending of the 2nd column: uš, aš, iš. This column has only closed syllables with a coda (an ending consonant).

- -Vš, pVr, Vb, Vl, Vz, Vk, Vm, Vd, Vḫ, V-a

There are a total of 44 sequences at most in any of the artifacts, which means 132 types of signs and therefore syllables, 176 examples to read and write, with a 264-letter count.
