= Gropper =

Gropper is a surname. Notable people with the surname include:

- Johann Gropper (1505–1559), German cardinal and church politician
- Philipp Gropper (born 1978), German composer and saxophonist
- Roberta Gropper (1897–1993), German politician
- William Gropper (1897–1977), American cartoonist
