= Sumerian disputations =

Sumerian genre of debate poems

The Sumerian disputation poem or Sumerian debate is a genre of Sumerian literature in the form of a disputation. Extant compositions from this genre date to the middle-to-late 3rd millennium BC. There are six primary poems belonging to this genre. The genre of Sumerian disputations also differs from Aesopic disputations as the former contain only dialogue without narration. In their own language, the texts are described as adamin in the doxologies at the end of the poem, which literally means "contests (between) two".

Scholars have referred to the genre by various other names as well, such as "precedence poems", "debate poems", and so on. The genre outlived its Sumerian form and continued to resonate in texts written in Middle Eastern languages for millennia.

The most well-attested of these poems are the Hoe and Plow and the Ewe and Grain, with over 60 and 70 manuscripts available for each respectively.

== Description ==
=== Structure ===
Disputations are poetic and are written in verse. They follows a tripartite structure:

1. Prologue
2. Disputation between two contenders
3. Adjudication scene (where the winner is declared)

The structure is sometimes laid out as five parts, though, with two additional parts listed to signal transitions in the text between the aforementioned (1) and (2), and (2) and (3):

1. Prologue
2. Transition 1 (where the cause for dispute is described)
3. Disputation between two contenders
4. Transition 2 (where at least one party seeks a judge to settle the dispute)
5. Adjudication scene (where the winner is declared)

=== Features ===
As dialogues, and unlike fables or other narrative texts, very little narration is present in Sumerian disputations. The contenders are inarticulate objects or creatures, like trees or fish. Unlike dialogues from other cultures or genres which aims to resolve a problem, these disputations aim to establish what is superior. Typically, the winner of the debate is also afforded more speaking time and has higher-quality argument over the course of the dispute.

Each exchange typically involves two speeches and rejoinders on the part of each contender. Common arguments pertain to the utility or lack thereof of what is being debated to humans. The disputation section ends when the contenders decide to appeal to a higher authority, perhaps a god (e.g. Enlil in Hoe and Plough) or man (e.g. Shulgi in Tree and Reed), to elect the winner. There is some evidence that these disputations were used in public performances.

=== Prologue ===
With the exception of the Hoe and the Plough, all these poems also contain a Sumerian cosmogony describing the creation of the cosmos and its creatures (including the two contenders) by the gods. Other Sumerian texts also contain cosmogonical prologues, like Gilgamesh, Enkidu, and the Netherworld. The function of these prologues is not to provide a broad cosmological discourse but instead to introduce the forthcoming subject.

=== Ending ===
All disputations end with a doxology in the following format, where X and Y are the two contenders, and DN is the adjudicator who decides the winner of the dispute:

Sumerian: X Y a-da-mìn dug₄-ga | X Y diri-ga-ba | DN zà-mí

English: Because in the disputation that X held with Y, X prevailed over Y, may DN be praised!

== Comparison with Akkadian disputations ==
Sumerian disputations ceased to be copied after the Old Babylonian Period. The oldest Akkadian disputation poem dates to the 18th century BC, and from this period onwards, it was Akkadian disputation poems that were copied in the 2nd and 1st millennia BC. None of the known Akkadian disputation poems are translations from Sumerian disputations; they use different literary conventions and verse structure, debate different topics, and so on, although the Akkadian Tamarisk and Palm has one Sumerian loanword. Nevertheless, some remarkable phraseological continuity is attested, such as between Hoe and Plough with the Akkadian Palm and Vine, even though two millennia separate their composition. However, there is a weakness to the literature of the Akkadian disputations: even though they are more recent, they are relatively fragmentary compared to the Sumerian disputations. Examples of this include that only a dozen lines survive of the Donkey Disputation and that less than a tenth is now known of the Series of the Poplar and the Series of the Fox, which, originally, would have been hundreds of verses in length.

== Scholarship ==
The major work behind the reconstruction of the disputation poems was done by M. Civil during the 1960s. The transliterations and translations subsequently became available on the Electronic Text Corpus of Sumerian Literature (ETCSL) in the early 2000s: as of 2017, only the content of Tree and Reed is not publicly available in a database.

== List of Sumerian disputations ==
=== Six major disputations ===
Since the 1950s, every list of Sumerian disputations have included the six following texts:

1. Debate between the hoe and the plough (CSL 5.3.1) (translation)
2. Debate between sheep and grain (CSL 5.3.2)
3. Debate between Winter and Summer (CSL 5.3.3)
4. Debate between tree and reed (CSL 5.3.4)
5. Debate between bird and fish (CSL 5.3.5)
6. Debate between silver and copper (CSL 5.3.6) (translation)

=== Controversial classifications ===
Kramer notes several other disputations:

1. Debate between the millstone and the gulgul-stone
2. The Disputation between Enkmansi and Girnishag
3. The Colloquy between an ungula and a Scribe
4. The Disputation between Enkitalu and Enkihegal
5. Disputation between Two School Graduates
6. Disputation between two unnamed ladies

Jimenez identifies another three disputation texts, normally labelled as "epics" or "love poems", with the same basic tripartite structure as the six main poems:

1. Enmerkar and the Lord of Aratta (CSL 1.8.2.3)
2. Enmerkar and Ensuḫkešdana (CSL 1.8.2.4)
3. Dumuzi and Enkimdu (CSL 4.8.31) (or: "Disputation between a shepherd and a farmer")

According to Jimenez, however, these works have features that distinguish them from Sumerian disputations proper: (1) In all six poems except for the Hoe and Plough, a cosmogonic prologue is contained; by contrast, none of these additional texts have a cosmogonic prologue (2) Unlike the inanimate objects of the six poems, the contenders in these disputations are humans (3) The six poems only have narration in the introduction but these other disputations have narration throughout the text.

Finally, Tamarisk and Palm (CSL 5.3.7) has been included by some scholars among the Sumerian disputations, but it is a translation of an Akkadian disputation, and so does not belong to the proper corpus of Sumerian literary works. Other works that have been suggested but cannot be properly classified as disputation poems include the Song of the Millstone (CSL 6.2.9), Goose and Raven (CSL 6.2.10), and Heron and Turtle (CSL 6.2.3).
