= Series of the Poplar =

Work of Akkadian literature

The "Series of the Poplar" is an Akkadian disputation poem containing a discussion between a Poplar, an Ash, and probably other trees, who each tries to establish his preeminence in the vegetal kingdom by listing their many uses and excellent qualities. Most of the surviving examples of the work are from the library of King Assurbanipal of Nineveh, "one of the most important repositories of texts from the entire ancient world".

Four sections of the text can be reconstructed at present, yielding a total of some 80 lines. The poem began with a cosmogonic introduction, now lost, followed by the description of the place of litigation, a gallery forest (qīšu), and the contenders, a poplar (ṣarbatu) and an ash (martû). The other preserved sections contain speeches of either Poplar or Ash, the order of which is difficult to determine. It seems likely that the Series of the Poplar would originally have comprised more than one chapter, in which perhaps other trees could have intervened — the poem Palm and Vine could well be part of the Series.

== Manuscripts ==
Three manuscripts of the text are known: two from Nineveh – apparently from different tablets – and one from Babylonia. The series is mentioned by title in the Neo-Assyrian inventory Rm.618, along with other disputation poems, and in the Catalogue of Texts and Authors. According to the latter, it was written by the Babylonian exorcist Ur-Nanna, who may have lived in the second half of the second millennium BCE.

The Nineveh manuscripts, once believed to be part of the Epic of Gilgameš, were edited in the 1960s; the larger Babylonian tablet received a first edition in 2017. The text is still very fragmentary.
