= Electronic Text Corpus of Sumerian Literature =

Digital database of Sumerian texts

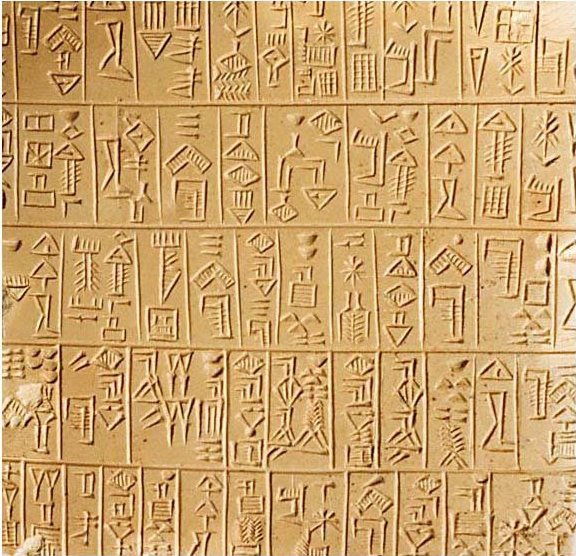
Sumerian cuneiform, ca. 26th century BCE

The Electronic Text Corpus of Sumerian Literature (ETCSL) is an online digital library of texts and translations of Sumerian literature that was created by a now-completed project based at the Oriental Institute of the University of Oxford.

This project's website contains "Sumerian text, English prose translation and bibliographical information" for "over 400 literary works composed in the Sumerian language in ancient Mesopotamia (modern Iraq) during the late third and early second millennia BCE." It is both browsable and searchable and includes transliterations, composite texts, a bibliography of Sumerian literature and a guide to spelling conventions for proper nouns and literary forms. The purpose of the project was to make Sumerian literature accessible to those wishing to read or study it, and make it known to a wider public.

The project was founded by Jeremy Black in 1997 and is based at the Oriental Institute of the University of Oxford. It was funded by the University along with the Leverhulme Trust and the Arts and Humanities Research Board. Various other bodies have been involved in the project including All Souls College, Oxford, the British Academy, the Hungarian Scientific Research Fund (OTKA) and the Hungarian Academy of Sciences. Contributors to the project have included Graham Cunningham, Eleanor Robson, Gábor Zólyomi, Miguel Civil, Bendt Alster, Joachim Krecher and Piotr Michałowski. Other libraries from the University of Chicago and the University of Pennsylvania now usually follow the ETCSL in regards to abbreviations. Funding for the project ended and it was closed in 2006, but the web site remains available.

== Publications ==
- J.A. Black, et al., The Literature of Ancient Sumer, Oxford University Press, 2004. ISBN 978-0-19-926311-0.
- J. Ebeling and G. Cunningham (eds.), Analysing Literary Sumerian: Corpus-Based Approaches, London: Equinox, 2007. ISBN 978-18-4553229-1.
