= Clay tablet =

Writing medium, especially for writing in cuneiform

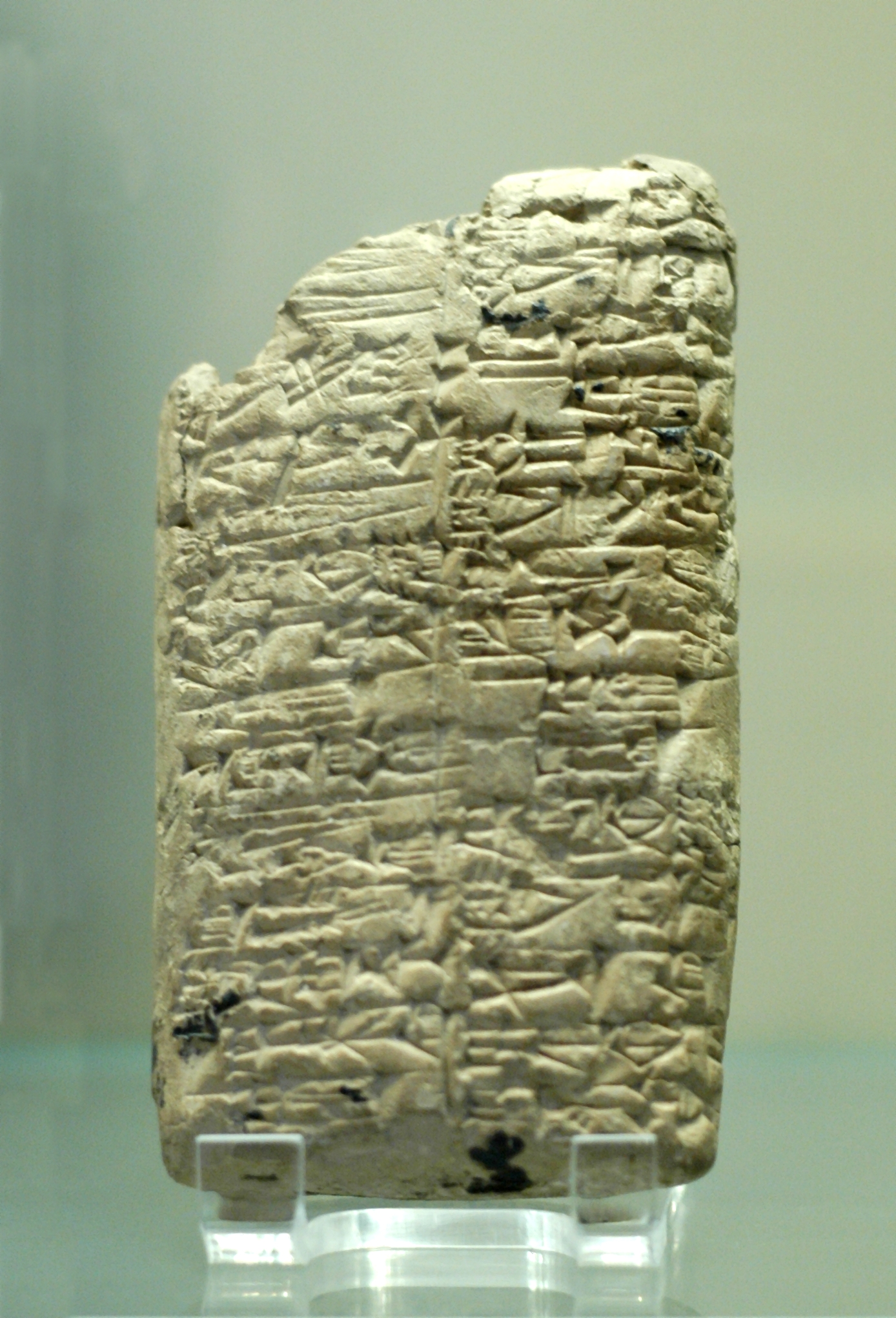
List of the victories of Rimush, king of Akkad, upon Abalgamash, king of Marhashi, and upon Emahsini, King of Elam, c. 2270 BCE.

In the Ancient Near East, clay tablets (Akkadian ṭuppu(m) 𒁾) were used as a writing medium, especially for writing in cuneiform, throughout the Bronze Age and well into the Iron Age.

Cuneiform characters were imprinted on a wet clay tablet with a stylus often made of reed, known as a reed pen. Once written upon, many tablets were dried in the sun or air, remaining fragile. Later, these unfired clay tablets could be soaked in water and recycled into new clean tablets. Other tablets, once written, were either deliberately fired in hot kilns, or inadvertently fired when buildings were burnt down by accident or during conflict, making them hard and durable. Collections of these clay documents made up the first archives. They were at the root of the first libraries. Tens of thousands of written tablets, including many fragments, have been found in the Middle East.

Most of the documents on tablets that survive from the Minoan and Mycenaean civilizations were created for accounting purposes. Tablets serving as labels with the impression of the side of a wicker basket on the back, and tablets showing yearly summaries, suggest a sophisticated accounting system. In this cultural region, tablets were never fired deliberately as the clay was recycled on an annual basis. However, some of the tablets were "fired" as a result of uncontrolled fires in the buildings where they were stored. The rest remain tablets of unfired clay and are therefore extremely fragile. For this reason, some institutions are investigating the possibility of firing them now to aid in their preservation.

== Scribes (dub-sar) ==
In Mesopotamia, writing differed from that of today. Writing began as simple counting marks, sometimes alongside a non-arbitrary sign, in the form of a simple image, pressed into clay tokens or less commonly cut into wood, stone or pots. In that way, the exact number of goods involved in a transaction could be recorded. This convention began when people developed agriculture and settled into permanent communities that were centered on increasingly large and organized trading marketplaces. These marketplaces were purposed for the trade of sheep, grain, and bread loaves, where transactions were recorded with clay tokens. These – initially very small – clay tokens were continually used all the way from the pre-historic Mesopotamia period, 9000 BCE, to the start of the historic period, around 3000 BCE, when the use of writing for recording was widely adopted.

The clay tablet was thus used by scribes to record events happening during their time. These scribes used styluses with sharp triangular tips, making it easy to leave markings on the clay; the clay tablets themselves came in a variety of colors such as bone white, chocolate, and charcoal. Pictographs then began to appear on clay tablets around 4000 BCE, and after the later development of Sumerian cuneiform writing, a more sophisticated partial syllabic script evolved that, by around 2500 BCE, was capable of recording the vernacular, the everyday speech of the common people.

Sumerians used what are known as pictograms. Pictograms are symbols that express a pictorial concept, a logogram, as the meaning of the word. Early writing also began in Ancient Egypt using hieroglyphs. Early hieroglyphs and some of the modern Chinese characters are other examples of pictographs. The Sumerians later shifted their writing to cuneiform, defined as "wedge writing" in Latin, which added phonetic symbols, syllabograms.

== Uses of clay tablets ==
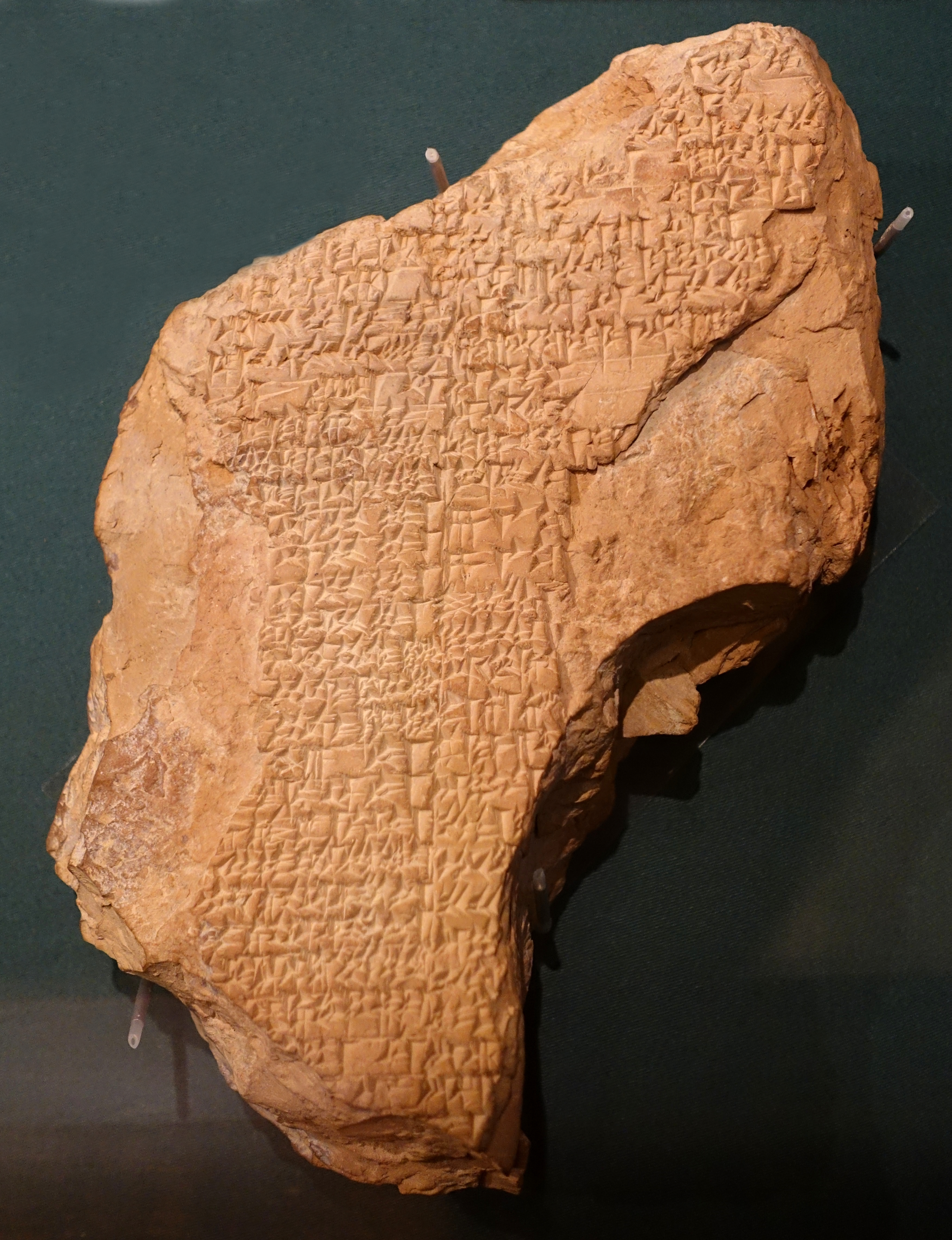
Sumerian clay tablet, currently housed in the Oriental Institute at the University of Chicago, inscribed with the text of the poem Inanna and Ebih by the priestess Enheduanna, the first author whose name is known

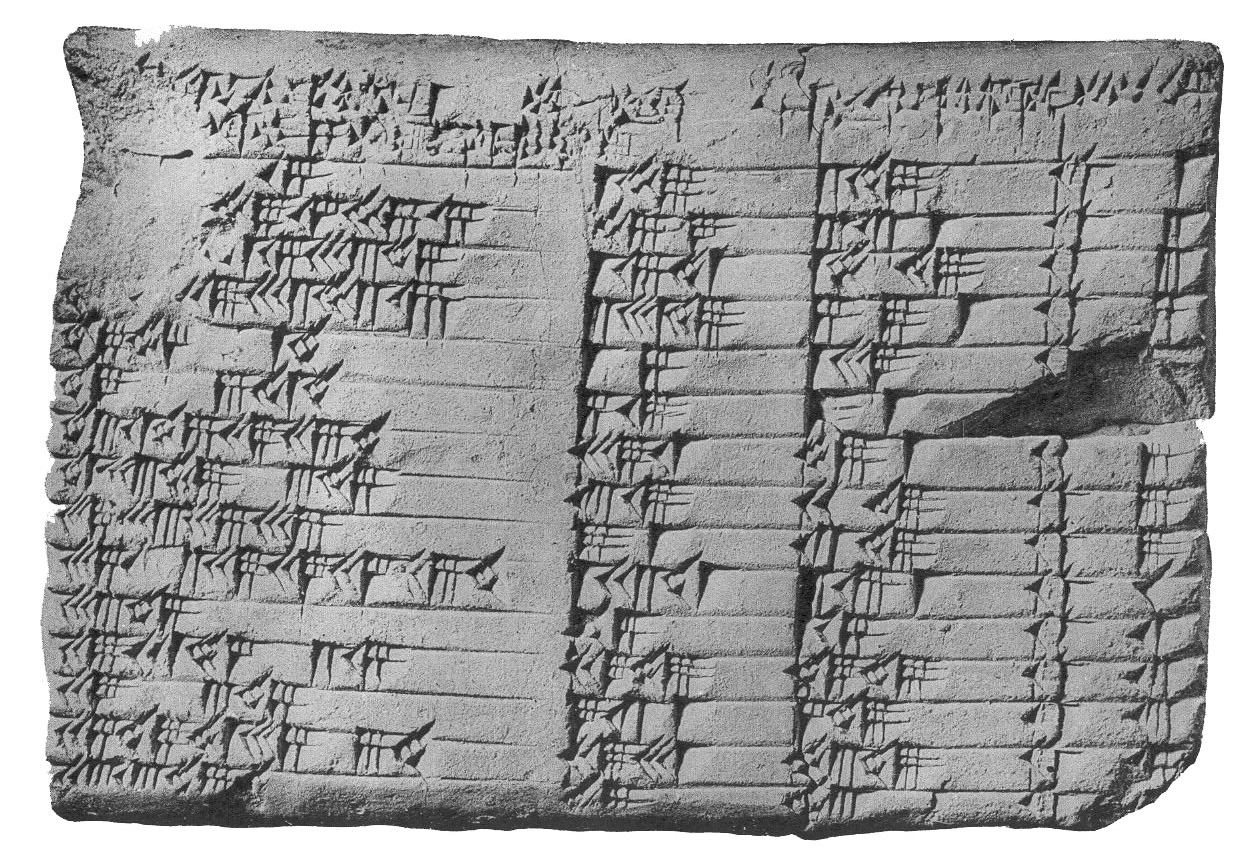
The Babylonian Plimpton 322 clay tablet, with numbers written in cuneiform script. Believed to have been written c. 1800 BCE, this table lists two of the three numbers in what are now called Pythagorean triples.

Text on clay tablets took the forms of myths, fables, essays, hymns, proverbs, epic poetry, business records, laws, plants, and animals. These clay tablets allowed individuals to record who and what was significant. One example of these stories is the Epic of Gilgamesh, which tells of the great flood that destroyed Sumer. Remedies and recipes that would have been largely unknown were then possible because of the clay tablet. Some of the recipes were kinds of stew, which was made with goat, garlic, onions and sour milk.

By the end of the 3rd millennium BCE, even the "short story" was first attempted, as independent scribes entered into the philosophical arena, with stories like "Debate between bird and fish" and other topics.

== Communication ==
Communication grew faster as now there was a way to get messages across greater distances, similar to mail. Important and private clay tablets were coated with an extra layer of clay so that no one else would read it. This method of communication was used for over 3000 years in fifteen different languages. Sumerians, Babylonians and Eblaites all had their own clay tablet libraries.

== History by region ==
=== Babylonia ===
Fragments of tablets containing the Epic of Gilgamesh dating to 1800–1600 BCE have been discovered. A full version has been found on tablets dated to the 1st millennium BCE.

Tablets on Babylonian astronomical records (such as Enuma Anu Enlil and MUL.APIN) date back to around 1800 BCE. Tablets discussing astronomical records continue through around 75 CE.

Late Babylonian tablets at the British Museum refer to appearances of Halley's Comet in 164 BCE and 87 BCE.

== See also ==
- Accounting tokens
- Code of Hammurabi
- Complaint tablet to Ea-nasir, the oldest known complaint letter
- Slate
- Wax tablet
