= Geshtu-E =

Mesopotamian god

Ilawela (formerly variously transcribed as Geshtu-(E), Geshtu, Gestu, or We-ila) is, in Sumerian and Akkadian mythology, a minor god of intelligence. In the Atra-Hasis Epic he was sacrificed by the great gods and his blood was used in the creation of mankind:

Ilawela who had intelligence,
They slaughtered in their assembly.
Nintu mixed clay
With his flesh and blood.
They heard the drumbeat forever after.
A ghost came into existence from the god’s flesh,
And she (Nintu) proclaimed it as his living sign.
The ghost existed so as not to forget (the slain god). […]
You have slaughtered a god together with his intelligence.
I have relieved you of your hard work.
I have imposed your load on man.

== See also ==
- Igigi, lesser gods who rebelled against Enlil and led the Anunnaki to create humankind
- Qingu
