= Atra-Hasis =

Akkadian creation myth

Atra-Hasis (Akkadian: 𒀜𒊏𒄩𒋀, romanized: Atra-ḫasīs) is an 18th-century BC Akkadian epic, recorded in various versions on clay tablets and named for one of its protagonists, the priest Atra-Hasis ('exceedingly wise'). The narrative has its origins in Sumerian historiography and comprises four focal points: An organisation of allied upper and lower gods shaping Mesopotamia agriculturally; a political conflict between them, pacified by manufacturing of a first human couple to serve as their labour force; the humans' mass reproduction within a few millennia; and a devastating deluge linked to the intention of the upper gods to destroy their imperfect artificial creatures.

Atrahasis is a relatively late epic of the flood myth ubiquitous in Mesopotamia; its oldest known versions date from the Ur III period, followed by an almost unbroken chain of transmission comprising Akkadian, Babylonian, Biblical and Qur’anic accounts (cf. flood myth). Recent research suggests that the relatively rapid rise in sea levels at the end of the last Ice Age may have formed the actual backdrop to this narrative – such an event suggests that ‘it is likely to have made an impression on the emerging settled communities (…), particularly given that the population living in the affected areas had become fully literate within three millennia of the last flood.' (J. Rose)

Atra-Hasis himself is first mentioned in the Sumerian King List as a ruler of Shuruppak, which, according to another of its accounts, was one of the earliest city-states in the period before that great deluge. The oldest known copy of the epic tradition concerning Atrahasis can be dated by colophon to the reign of Hammurabi’s great-grandson, Ammi-Saduqa (1646–1626 BC). (Note: The variant versions are not direct translations of a single original.) However, various Old Babylonian dialect fragments exist, one more was recovered in Ugarit, and the epic continued to be copied into the first millennium BC.

The story of Atrahasis also exists in Assyrian dialect versions, rediscovered in the Library of Ashurbanipal, though its translations have been uncertain due to the artifact being in fragmentary condition and containing ambiguous words. Nonetheless, its fragments were first assembled and translated by George Smith as The Chaldean Account of Genesis, the hero of which had his name corrected to Atra-Hasis by Heinrich Zimmern in 1899. In 1965, Wilfred G. Lambert and Alan Millard published many additional texts belonging to the epic, including an Old Babylonian copy (written c. 1650 BC) which is the most complete recension of the tale to have survived. These new texts greatly increased knowledge of the epic and were the basis for Lambert and Millard’s first English translation of the Atrahasis epic in something approaching entirety.

== Myths and facts ==
The epic of Atra-Hasis contains the myth of the creation of mankind by Enlil, Anu and Enki, also known as Anunnaki and Igigi, the superior and the inferior gods. They seem to have been united in an organization similar to that which existed in Greece between Zeus – as ‘pure spirit or air’ the leading party – and the groups round Poseidon (water) and Hades (earth). (Note: Walter Burkert traces the model drawn from Atrahasis to a corresponding passage, the division by lots of the air, underworld and sea among Zeus, Hades, and Poseidon in the Iliad, in which “a resetting through which the foreign framework still shows” (pp. 88–91).Burkert, Walter. 1992. The Orientalizing Revolution: Near Eastern Influence on Greek Culture in the Early Archaic Age. Harvard University Press.) The Eridu Genesis resembles Atrahasis in some central aspects. It recounts the dawn of civilisation—how the gods brought their various inventions down from a sacred Mount to earth, even hinting that the groups of prehistoric man previously roamed Mesopotamia as free nomads.

=== Overview ===
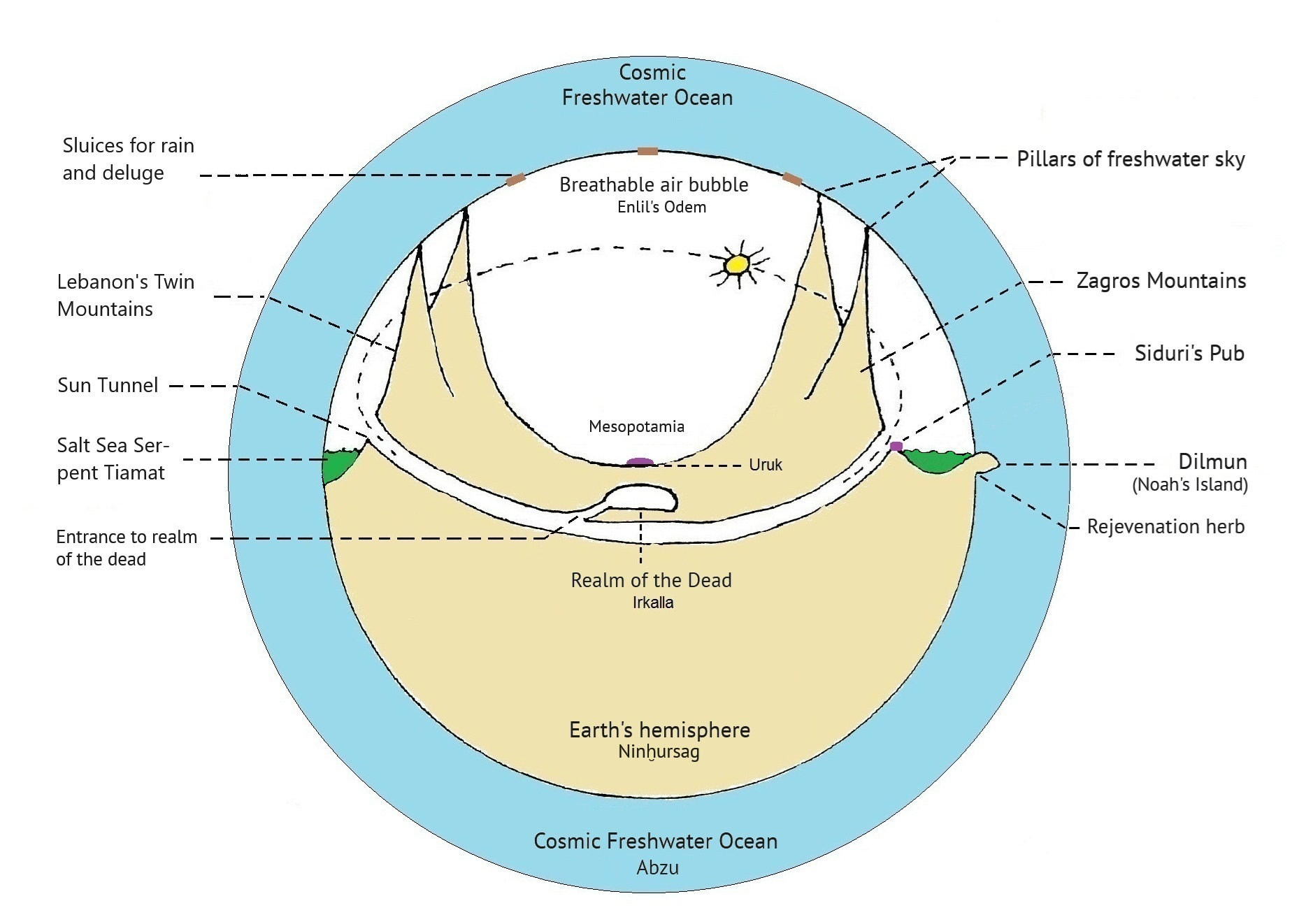
Illustration of Sumerian creation myths. They describe the Abzu as cosmic freshwater ocean, whose mating with serpent Tiamat – a symbol of the salty sea – gave rise to Mother Earth Ninhursag. The Abzu envelops our planet from above and below, whilst Tiama, also called the "bitter river", flows around its edges, so the sketch shows the same as Babylon's map, now in sideview. A bubble of breathable air clings to earth, with the Abzu's boundary layer as "a roof" like on Athrahasis's lifeboat (s. epic alongside). Further details, such as the "Babylonian's Noah" island (Dilmun) and the tunnel (through which sun god Shamash travels at night), are taken from the text of the Babylonian world map as well as of the Gilgamesh epic. An important technical detail are also the sluices built into sky. Through them, the gods, well skilled in construction of irrigation systems, supplied their garden land Eden with rain, but also unleashed the Flood.

In the main, the epic reports on a conflict between some groups of Sumerian gods and draws on the myth of the separation of air and earth ‘above’ and ‘below’ in the midst of the cosmic freshwater primordial ocean to clarify their hierarchical relationship. (Cf. Enūma Eliš and The Seven Tablets of Creation). Enlil – "Lord Wind" – represents the leading party in the council of gods; the party of Anunnaki around Anu belongs more to the upper heaven, and that of Igigi around Enki more to that below the earth sphere.

All three parties are bound by the Tablet of Destinies, which Enlil is the only one to possess. In the Sumerian myths, it was bestowed on him by the earth mother goddess Ninḫursag herself (cf. Anzu myth). His aptitude as the greatest warrior and chief strategist of the divine tribal alliance gives him power over the other parties of gods; only he has the ability to transform present circumstances back into their original state – redefining the course of fate.

As a permanent legal document the tablet was provided with a seal, a sign mechanically applied by means of a special technique, which in ancient Mesopotamia was regarded as a symbol of a contract. Contracts have been directly related to tribute payments to be made: often to shares of the food produced (see the cattle to be divided equitably between Prometheus and Zeus), but generally to assistance in battle or labour, such as the construction of mighty irrigation channels as described in the epic discussed here. As far as the male groups of gods were concerned, the separate task of reproduction fell to the seven divine wombs, the shassuratu presided over by Ninḫursag (Mami).

The plot of the epic follows a simple pattern:

- The creation of earth and all creatures that inhabit it is already complete.
- An organisation of at least three male parties of gods exist; they seem to specialise in ‘thinkers and workers’.
- The gods doing the hardest farm labour are dissatisfied and rise up against Enlil (master of the universe).
- With help of divine women, the victorious party arranges the production of a first pair of humans who, with all their descendants, are to serve all the gods as labour slaves for eternity.
- As a result of their unrestrained multiplication, an overpopulation crisis breaks out. The upper gods try to get this under control in various ways, one last time by triggering a global flood to wipe out humanity.
- A single fertile human couple survives – thanks to an act of sabotage by one of the lower gods. In the end, the quarrelling rulers of Mesopotamia agree on a utopian method to reduce the reproduction of their creatures to a tolerable level.

== Synopsis ==
=== Tablet I ===
The epos taking place according to its incipit, "When the gods had to work like humans (inuma ilu awilum = when the gods were humans)", there was a quarrel between the upper Anunnaki and the Igigu, the lower gods. While the latter had the task of ensuring the supply of the land through construction of irrigation canals by digging out the beds of big rivers, the Anunnaki ruled from above, presumably watching over the implementation of their plans and dividing the fruits of this great civilising project as they saw fit. After 40 years, however, the lesser gods rebelled and refused to do strenuous labor. At night, they surrounded the dwelling place of Enlil, who was considered the main god of Sumerian civilisation, the separator of air and earth in the midst of the cosmic ocean.[12]

Enlil was surprised and called for Anu and Enki. Nusku, one of the sons and Enlil's ambassador here, tried to negotiate with the rebellious party, but had no success. Enlil, who also was the benevolent, wise leader of all the gods, didn't want a battle with the risk of serious injuries and deaths, and to avoid this he devised the plan to create easily controllable (obedient) humans to do the hard labour in place of the rebellious gods. He asked Mami – leader of the 7 goddess wombs – if she could help. Mami declared that she could only fulfil this request with Enki's assistance. Enki, agreeing, advised the assembly of all gods that they should first cleanse themselves for everything else. They do. On the fifteenth day of this project, he cut up Geshtu-E – 'ear', a partie of lesser gods who listened to the higher ones wisdom (Note: On some tablets the slained under-god is called Weila or Aw-ilu.) – into pieces (cf. Plato's dissection of the rebellious spherical people into weak single individuals) and began to create the first human being to the sound of drums. He took clay from the soil of the steppe (Mami was regarded as primordial mother earth, so with the clay from her body female fertility came into play here), mixed it with the spilt blood and added a touch of cosmic water, bringing it to its living form. When the creature awoke, Mami approached, handed it a carrying basket and taught it to work for the gods from then on.

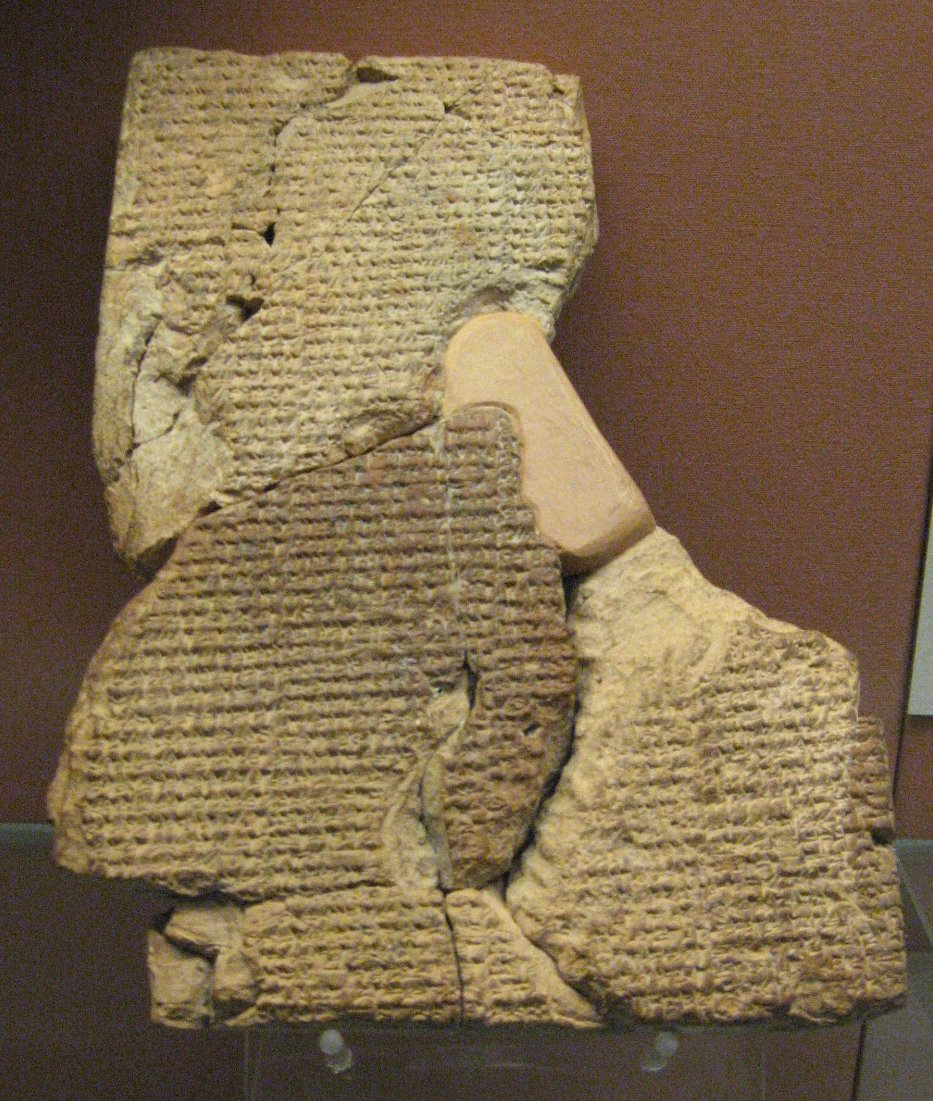
One of the damaged tablets that preserve the epic in cuneiform script, exhibited here in the British Museum. The reconstruction of the narrative was carried out by comparing of documents, which contain the same epic - at the very least parts influenced by it - in more or less varied forms.

(There is a gap in the tablet; when it resumes, a woman is placed beside the man, whereby both start their sexual reproduction at Mami's command. Whether the original text let create the woman in the same way as the man or introduced her in a different manner can only be speculated upon due to the missing passage. However, two things are certain: 1- The pairing of man and woman here serves to pacify a political conflict, embodying a narrative that also appears in other myths. Cf. Pandora as a fatal gift for Epimetheus, crafted by the leading group of gods around Zeus with help of Athena; and the taming of the animal-man Enkidu through seduction by an irresistibly beautiful women. 2- The biblical Genesis, about a thousand years younger, was influenced in many ways by the Sumerians, but shows one striking difference above all: Instead of an alliance of three humanly quarreling groups of gods, the singular-omnipotent God of monotheistic religion now appears as The Creator. Like in Atrahasis, the manufacture of man then begins first and again from the clayey soil of the steppe Eden; only after this does the story shift to the theme of woman, "Eve". Fashioned from a part of the male body, "Adam" for this intervention is cast into a deep sleep, with God's following argument: "It is not good that man should be alone; I will make him a helper comparable to him." Gen. 2, 18-22)

To complete the construction of humans in the optimal way, Mami encouraged the young couple to celebrate a seven-day feast in honour of Isthar, the goddess of war and sexuality.* Both obeyed. After 9 months, the land of the gods gave birth to its first human child, whose purpose in life was to be the same as that of his parents.

(* Cf. Gilgamesh epic: there, too, the gods arranged a seven-day sexual act to pacify a kind of cold war. Protagonists are Enkidu: an almost invincible, rebellious animal-man or son of the "Gazelle" clan, and the female temple servant Shamkat, endowed with all advantages necessary for that purpose. Enkidu, who had previously destroyed so many animal traps with his fierce group of relatives, fell into this new type of trap: after having sex for 7 days, he was weakened – his herd of alleged animals fled into the steppe in horror. He was shocked of his lonely separation, but Shamkat, unaware that she was only following the gods' plan to domesticate Enkidu, transforming the beast into human, tried to comfort him: "Don't grieve; you have knowledge now, just like the gods!" See also Adam's initial loneliness in paradise, and, after Eve's creation, their shared enjoyment of the fruit of the Tree of Knowledge.)

1200 years later, humans had multiplied to such an extent that they disturbed the gods with their noise. Enlil was annoyed and decided that Namtar, his god of the dead's realm, should carry off most of humans with frost fever, so a great extinction began. Enki, probably worried that he would end up having to work again himself, approached his faithful priest Atraḫasis and advised him to do the following: The other gods should no longer be worshipped, but only Namtar. This flattered the god of deadly diseases so much that as soon as he had begun his pandemic work, he ceased to eliminate people.

=== Tablet II ===
is about the unstoppable increase in overpopulation.

After another 1200 years there were many more humans, they roamed around like roaring herds of cattle. Because the gods in upper part of heaven could no longer even sleep, Enlil sent Adad and, again 1200 years later, the fertility goddess Nisaba to devastate the land with storms and dry up the harvests. Enki – residing below the Earth's sphere in heaven (well protected from noise) – told his priest Atraḫasis what to do about it each time: Only Adad and Nisaba should be sacrificed to, the other gods should be left to starve. The pious priest acted according to this divine advice; Adad and Nisaba were so ashamed of this undeserved favour that they abandoned their endeavour. Enlil now completely enraged against Enki and decreed that a mighty flood should consume all of humanity. In addition, he made Enki swear before all Anunnaki that he will never speak another word to any human; he then began to consult with the assembled gods about the exact date and duration of the deluge to be unleashed.

=== Tablet III ===
contains the flood myth.

Well informed with all details, Enki went to his priest's reed hut, but waited until Atraḫasis began to lie down to sleep. Then, speaking cunningly to the hut's wall so as not to breach the contract, Enki told 'it' (Note: Suggestive of an oracle.) what to do: ‘Separate yourself from your house, build a ship, spurn your possessions, save your life.’ The ship should be cube-shaped and also be watertight from above with a roof "like Abzu" itself. Atraḫasis should not tell anyone about the coming flood, take a large supply of food with him (including live birds and even fish, as the poet added with humorous irony) and keep an eye on the hourglass for seven days from start of the catastrophe. So the priest 'Extremely Wise' hurriedly left his belongings under a pretence and began building the ship. He invited his neighbours to help and had no scruples about promising them that the reward would soon come richly from heaven. The deadline was pressing, so he organised a big party to attract more workers. He himself was unable to eat during the lavish feast, so nauseous was he with fear of the impending punishment of the gods.

When Adad gathered the clouds and the winds began to roar from all ends of the world, Atraḫasis and at least one fertile woman (the masters sons too) climbed into the ship and sealed its entrance hatch from inside with pitch. The ark swirled like a pot on the waves of the mighty flood thundering down from the open floodgates of the cosmic primordial ocean. And how furious Enlil was at his foiled plan to destroy mankind! - The other gods, however, suffered from hunger, as they were unable to find any more humans to feed them in the midst of the raging chaos. They cry at the immense destruction, and Mami (Belet-ili) raised serious accusations against Enli: "Why you, the greatest warrior of all gods, didn't fight the rebels" (instead of constructing humans)?!

A few lines are missing here again, but these can be added according to the Epic of Gilgamesh: After the ark is stranded high up on Mount Nisir, Uta-napišti (the name of Atraḫasis in the Epic of Gilgamesh) sends out three birds - presumably at daily intervals: a dove, a swallow and a raven. The raven, the least able to fly, didn't return, so Utanpištim knew that the land – probably still hidden from his view under thick clouds – was accessible again.

Atraḫasis descended from his ark and began to offer a food sacrifice to all the gods indiscriminately with a zeal eager to serve. How happy the gods were who had been starving for so long! As if they were flies lured by the scent, they swarmed in from all sides to the altar's fire and began to feast to their hearts' – for which they later endowed Anthrahais with their immortality in gratitude and settled him with his wife on the island of Dilmun on the distant edge of the world (see Gilgamesh flood myth).

Enlil, however, who as a wise ruler was responsible for the welfare of this great civilisation, was still furious with Enki, the culprit whose treachery had once again enabled some humans to survive the genocide what was planned this time. Enki, however, as always never at a loss for creative ideas, devised a way that he hoped would finally solve the problem caused by the quarrelling gods themselves. He decreed that from now on the humans would be familiarised with suffering and death from birth, that there would be barren and untouchable women and that their lifespan would be severely limited from the outset (in biblical terms to 120 years), (Note: In the epic Gilgamesh, however, the famous hero's mother is a goddess and his father just a human (a priest). Nevertheless, the two thirds of humanity that Gilgamesh retains from this pairing are the reason for his mortality (narrowly limited lifespan) and his unsuccessful quest for divine immortality.) in the hope that their reproduction would be regulated in future. With this promise that the gods would have sufficient living space of their own on earth for all time, Enlil could be content and make peace with Enki.

== Alterations and adaptations ==
=== Lineage of Atra-Hasis ===
In later versions of the flood story, contained in the Epic of Gilgamesh and the Eridu Genesis, the hero is not named Atra-Hasis.

In Gilgamesh, the name of the flood hero is Utnapishtim, who is said to be the son of Ubara-Tutu, king of Shuruppak: "Gilgamesh spoke to Utnapishtim, the Faraway... O man of Shuruppak, son of Ubara-Tutu." Many available tablets comprising the Sumerian King Lists support the lineage of the flood hero given in Gilgamesh by omitting a king named Shuruppak as a historical ruler of Shuruppak, implying a belief that the flood story took place after or during the rule of Ubara-Tutu.

In Eridu Genesis, first recorded in the 17th century BC (i.e., the Old Babylonian Empire), the hero is named Ziusudra, who also appears in the Instructions of Shuruppak as the son of the eponymous Shuruppak, who himself is called the son of Ubara-Tutu.

The "Sumerian King Lists" also make no mention of Atra-Hasis, Utnapishtim, or Ziusudra. Tablet "WB 62", however, provides a different chronology: Atra-Hasis is listed as a ruler of Shuruppak and a "gudug" priest, preceded by his father Shuruppak, who is, in turn, preceded by his father Ubara-Tutu, as in "The Instructions of Shuruppak". This tablet is unique in that it mentions both Shuruppak and Atra-Hasis.

=== Gilgamesh and the flood myth ===
Subsequent versions of the flood myth in the Ancient Near East evidently alter (omit and/or editorially change) information about the flood and the flood hero found in the original Atra-Hasis story. In particular, a lost, intermediate version of the Atra-Hasis flood myth seems to have been paraphrased or copied in a late edition of the Epic of Gilgamesh (Tablet XI). This modern addition of Gilgamesh, known as the 'standard version', is traditionally associated with the Babylonian scribe Sîn-lēqi-unninni (circa 1300–1000 BC), though some minor changes may have been made since his time.

Regarding the editorial changes to the Atra-Hasis text in Gilgamesh, Jeffrey H. Tigay comments: "The dropping of individual lines between others which are preserved, but are not synonymous with them, appears to be a more deliberate editorial act. These lines share a common theme, the hunger and thirst of the gods during the flood."

==== Alterations ====
Examples of alterations to the Atra-Hasis story in Gilgamesh include:

- Omitting information, for example:
  - The hero being at a banquet when the storm and flood begins: "He invited his people...to a banquet... He sent his family on board. They ate and they drank. But he [Atrahasis] was in and out. He could not sit, could not crouch, for his heart was broken and he was vomiting gall."
  - "She was surfeited with grief and thirsted for beer."
  - "From hunger they were suffering cramps."
- Editorial changes, for example:
  - "Like dragonflies they have filled the river" was changed to "Like the spawn of fishes, they fill the sea."
- Weakening of anthropomorphic descriptions of the gods, for example:
  - "The Anunnaki (the senior gods) [were sitt]ing in thirst and hunger" changed to "The gods feared the deluge."

== See also ==
- Alan Millard
- Babylonian and Assyrian religion
- Eridu Genesis
- Flood myth
- Gilgamesh flood myth
- Noah's Ark
