= Mesopotamian mythology =

Mesopotamian texts that talk about gods and fantastic creatures

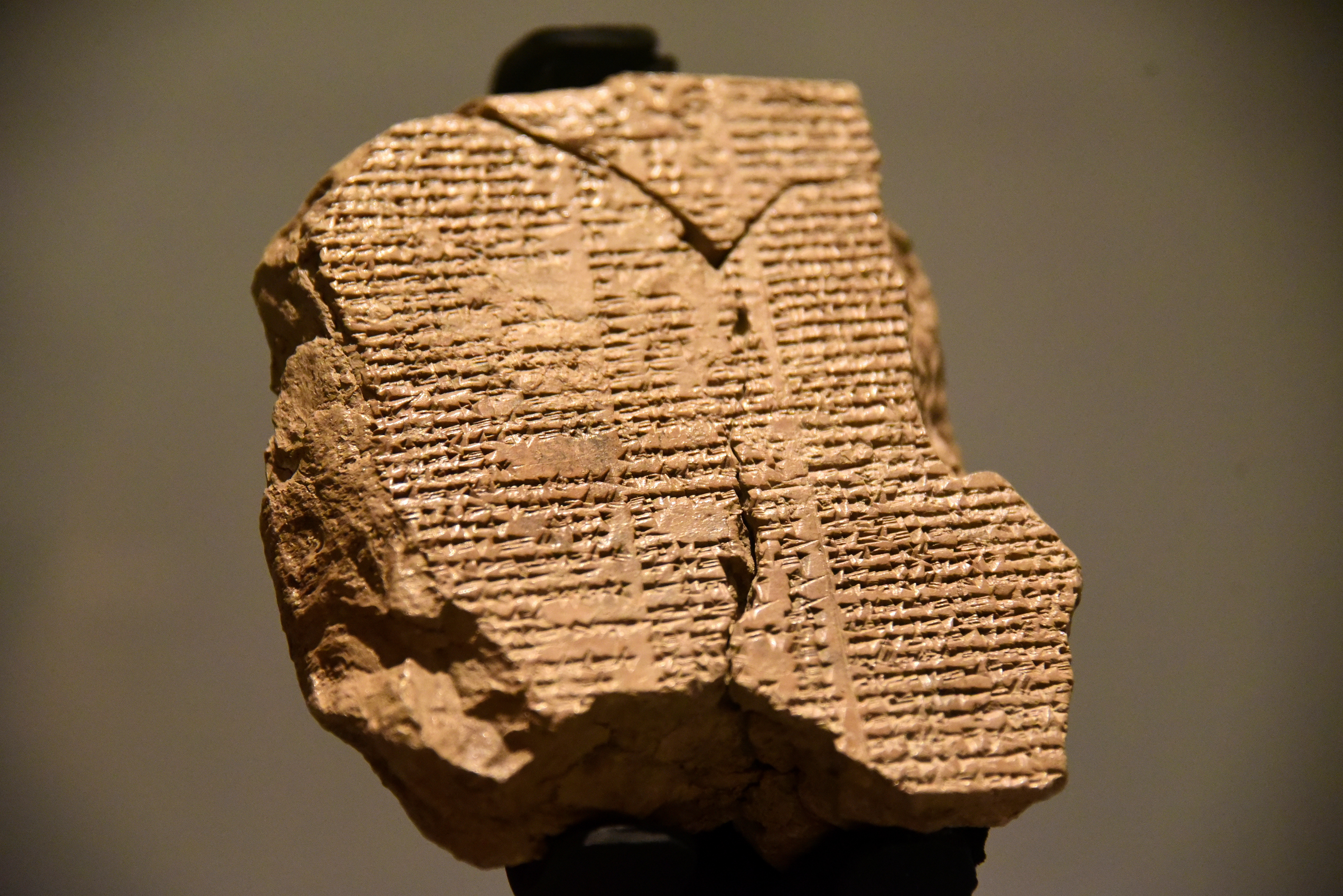
Tablet V of the Epic of Gilgamesh from the Old-Babylonian Period, 2003–1595 BCE. An epic poem from ancient Mesopotamia, regarded as the earliest surviving notable literature.

Mesopotamian mythology refers to the myths, religious texts, and other literature that comes from the region of ancient Mesopotamia which is a historical region of Western Asia, situated within the Tigris–Euphrates river system that occupies the area of present-day Iraq. In particular the societies of Sumer, Akkad, and Assyria, all of which existed shortly after 3000 BCE and were mostly gone by 400 CE. These works were primarily preserved on stone or clay tablets and were written in cuneiform by scribes. Several lengthy pieces have survived erosion and time, some of which are considered the oldest stories in the world, and have given historians insight into Mesopotamian ideology and cosmology.

== Creation myths ==
There are many different accounts of the creation of the earth from the Mesopotamian region. This is because of the many different cultures in the area and the shifts in narratives that are common in ancient cultures due to their reliance on word of mouth to transmit stories. These myths can share related themes, but the chronology of events vary based on when or where the story was written down.

=== Atra-Hasis ===
Atra-Hasis refers both to one of the Mesopotamian myths focusing on the earth’s creation, and also the main character of that myth. The myth possibly has Assyrian roots, as a fragmented version may have been found in the library of Ashurbanipal, though translations remain unsure. Its most complete surviving version was recorded in Akkadian. The myth begins with humans being created by the mother goddess Mami to lighten the gods' workload. She made them out of a mixture of clay, flesh, and blood from a slain god. Later in the story though, the god Enlil attempts to control overpopulation of humans through various methods, including famine, drought, and finally, a great flood. Mankind is saved by Atrahasis, who was warned of the flood by the god Enki and built a boat to escape the waters, eventually placating the gods with sacrifices.

=== Eridu Genesis ===
Eridu Genesis has a similar plot to that of the Akkadian myth, Atra-Hasis, though it is harder to tell what happens exactly in Eridu Genesis because the tablet upon which it was recorded is badly damaged. The two stories share the flood as the major event however, although the hero who survives in Eridu Genesis is called Zi-ud-sura instead of Atrahasis. Eridu Genesis was recorded around the same time as Atra-Hasis, however the fragmented tablet that held it was found in Nippur, located in modern-day east Iraq, while the version of Atra-hasis that came from the same time was found in the library of Ashurbanipal, in modern-day north Iraq.

=== Enuma Elish ===
Enuma Elis (also spelled Enuma Elish) is a Babylonian creation myth with an unclear composition, though it possibly dates back to the Bronze Age. This piece was thought to be recited in a ritual celebration of the Babylonian new year. It chronicles the birth of the gods, the world, and man, whose purpose was to serve the gods and lighten their work load. The focus of the narrative is on praising Marduk, the patron god of Babylon, who creates the world, the calendar, and humanity.

== Heroic epics ==
These stories tended to focus on a great hero, following their journey through trials or simply important events in their life. Stories like these can be found in many different cultures around the world, and often give insight into the values of those societies. For example, in a culture that celebrated a hero that was devout to the gods or respected their father, it can be inferred that the society valued those traits.

=== Epic of Gilgamesh ===
The Epic of Gilgamesh is a well known Mesopotamian myth, often regarded as the oldest surviving work of literature. It was initially a number of individual short stories, and was not combined into one cohesive epic until the 18th century BCE. The story follows the Sumerian king Gilgamesh, typically regarded as a historical figure, and his good friend, Enkidu through various adventures and quests that eventually lead to Enkidu's death. The second half of the epic deal with Gilgamesh, distressed about the death of his friend and his own impending mortality, as he searches for immortality. In the end he fails, but he comes to terms with the fact that he is eventually going to die and returns to his city of Uruk a wiser king.

=== The Myth of Adapa ===
The earliest record of the myth of Adapa is from the 18th century BCE. Adapa was a Sumerian citizen who was blessed by the god Enki with immeasurable intelligence. However, one day Adapa was knocked into the sea by the south wind, and in a rage he broke the south wind’s wings so that it could no longer blow. Adapa was summoned to be judged by An, and before he left Enki warned him not to eat or drink anything offered to him. However, An had a change of heart when he realized just how smart Adapa was, and offered him the food of immortality, which Adapa, dutiful to Enki, turned down. This story is used as an explanation for humankind’s mortality, it is associated with the fall of man narrative that is also present in Christianity.

== Common themes ==
Immortality is a constant goal of the characters in Mesopotamian epics. No matter the version of the story, the man who survives the flood, whether Atrahasis, Zi-ud-sura, or Utnapishtim, is granted immortality by the gods. This character then makes a reappearance in the Epic of Gilgamesh, when Gilgamesh is searching for immortality after coming to fear death and the underworld after hearing stories from his friend, Enkidu, about what awaits humanity after death. Enkidu says:

On entering the House of Dust,
everywhere I looked there were royal crowns gathered in heaps,
everywhere I listened, it was the bearers of crowns,
who, in the past, had ruled the land,
but who now served Anu and Enlil cooked meats,
served confections, and poured cool water from waterskins.

Upon hearing that his position in life did not matter in the underworld, Gilgamesh is terrified and seeks out Utnapishtim, who has achieved immortality after surviving the flood sent by the gods to wipe out humanity. Immortality is also touched on in the myth of Adapa. Adapa’s accidental refusal to eat the food of immortality offered to him by the gods is used as an explanation for the fact that humans die.

Also common in Mesopotamian myths is the reoccurring concept that humanity’s purpose is to serve the gods. In all of the creation myths, humans are only made by the gods in order to help in the fields or offer sacrifices. When they get to be too numerous, loud, or otherwise bothersome, the gods attempt to control the population through plagues, droughts, and most famously, the great flood. This disregard for human life emphasizes the hierarchy that existed in the Mesopotamian consciousness, with humans existing as subjects to the will of the gods.

A recent comprehensive study of ancient Mesopotamian rituals and their correlations with myths reveals that another recurrent topic of Mesopotamian myths is that specific rituals (Sumerian: me; Akkadian: parṣu) are in the possession of certain gods and how these rituals came into the possession of other gods or how they were given by the gods to humankind.

== Sources ==
Modern understanding of Mesopotamian mythology has been provided through archeological excavations of West Asia and the recovery of many stone and clay tablets, some of which contained the records of many myths. There have been different versions of each myth found in various locations across the region, with inconsistencies between each but maintaining overall common themes and narratives. These versions were written in different languages, including Akkadian, Sumerian, and Old Babylonian, and were often translated from one to another, leading to further inconsistencies due to the inherently imperfect nature of these translations.

== Research ==
Since 2026, the Living Library of Hylistics portal offers an overview of modern scholarly research on Mesopotamian (and other) myths, and also includes an introduction to the theory and methodology of mythological research.

== See also ==
- Ancient Mesopotamian religion
- Descent of Inanna into the Underworld
- List of Mesopotamian deities
