= Anunnaki =

Group of ancient Mesopotamian deities

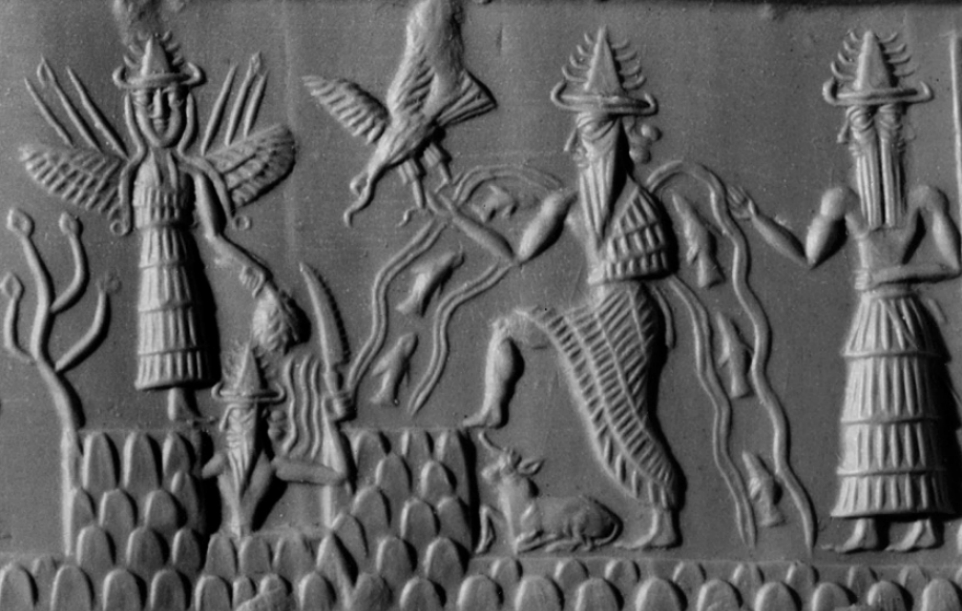
An Akkadian cylinder seal dating to c. 2300 BCE depicting the deities Inanna, Enki, and Utu, three members of the Anunnaki

The Anunnaki (Sumerian: 𒀭𒀀𒉣𒈾, also transcribed as Anunaki, Annunaki, Anunna, Ananaki and other variations) are a group of deities of the ancient Sumerians, Akkadians, Assyrians and Babylonians. In the earliest Sumerian writings about them, which come from the Post-Akkadian period, the Anunnaki are deities in the pantheon, descendants of An (the god of the heavens) and Ki (the goddess of earth), and their primary function was to decree the fates of humanity.

== Etymology ==
In Sumerian, the name of this group of deities is variously written as "^{d}a-nun-na", "^{d}a-nun-na-ke_{4}-ne", or "^{d}a-nun-na", possibly meaning "princely offspring", "royal offspring" or literally "offspring/progeny/seed of princes". Because this was likely pronounced as "anunak", it entered into the Akkadian language as the loanword "anunnak(k)u". "Anunnaki" is the genitive inflection of this word, meaning its use as a proper noun is essentially faulty. There is no etymological relation with the Sumerian sky deity An.

The Anunnaki were believed to be the offspring of An and the earth goddess Ki. Samuel Noah Kramer identifies Ki with the Sumerian mother goddess Ninhursag, stating that they were originally the same figure. The oldest of the Anunnaki was Enlil, the god of air and chief god of the Sumerian pantheon. The Sumerians believed that, until Enlil was born, heaven and earth were inseparable. Then, Enlil split heaven and earth in two and carried away the earth while his father An carried away the sky.

== Worship and iconography ==
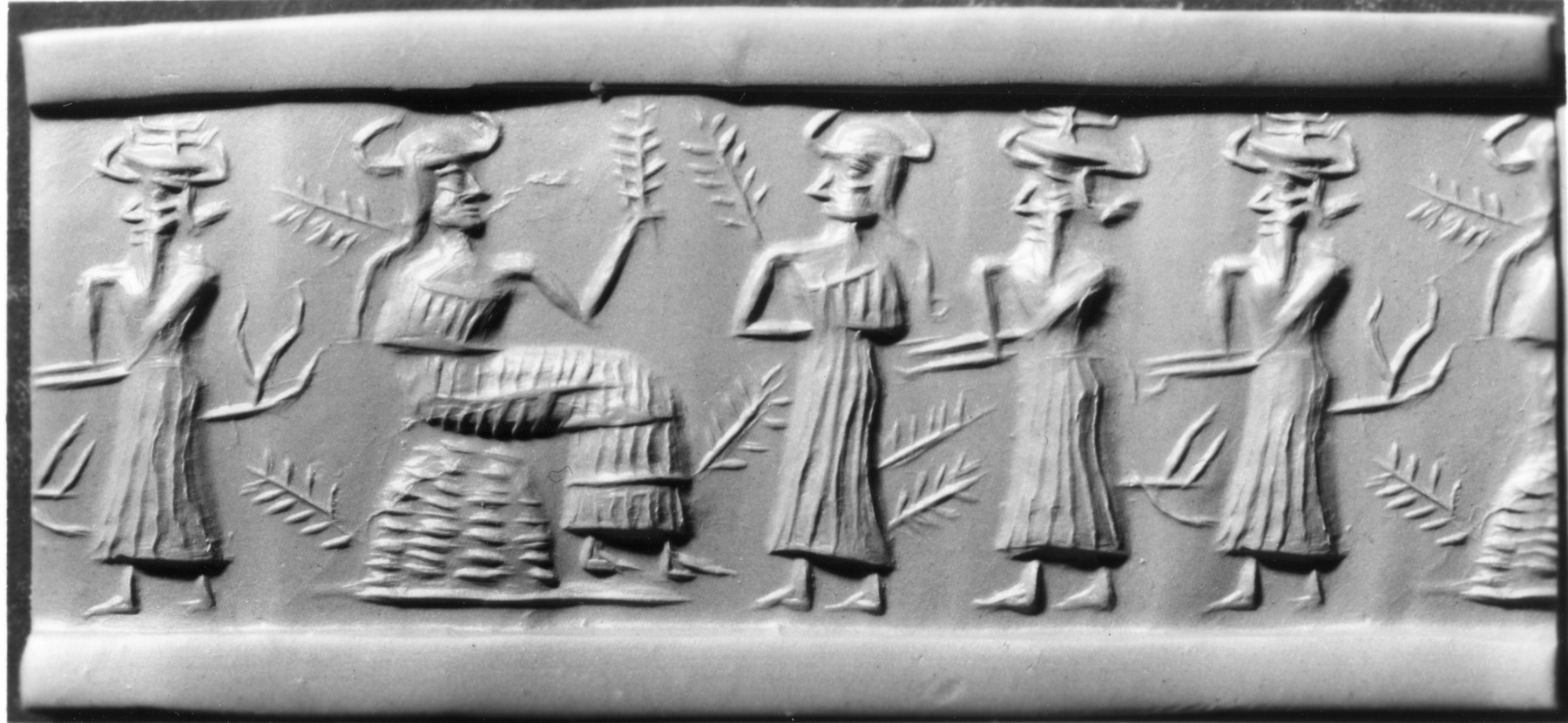
An Akkadian cylinder seal impression depicting a vegetation goddess, possibly Ninhursag, sitting on a throne surrounded by worshippers (c. 2350–2150 BCE)

The Anunnaki are chiefly mentioned in literary texts and very little evidence to support the existence of any cult of them has yet been unearthed. This is likely because each member of the Anunnaki had their own individual cult, separate from the others. Similarly, no representations of the Anunnaki as a complete group have yet been discovered, although a few depictions of two or three individual members together have been identified.

Deities in ancient Mesopotamia were almost exclusively anthropomorphic. They were thought to possess extraordinary powers and were often envisioned as being of tremendous physical size. The deities typically wore melam, an ambiguous substance which "covered them in terrifying splendor". Melam could also be worn by heroes, kings, giants, and even demons. The effect that seeing a deity's melam has on a human is described as ni, a word for the physical tingling of the flesh. Deities were almost always depicted wearing horned caps, consisting of up to seven superimposed pairs of ox-horns. They were also sometimes depicted wearing clothes with elaborate decorative gold and silver ornaments sewn into them.

The ancient Mesopotamians believed that their deities lived in Heaven, after an earlier history of visiting earth in the mythological texts, and that a god's statue was a physical embodiment of the god himself. As such, cult statues were given constant care and attention and a set of priests was assigned to tend to them. These priests would clothe the statues and place feasts before them so they could "eat". A deity's temple was believed to be that deity's literal place of residence.

The gods had boats, full-sized barges which were normally stored inside their temples and were used to transport their cult statues along waterways during various religious festivals. The gods also had chariots, which were used for transporting their cult statues by land. Sometimes a deity's cult statue would be transported to the location of a battle so that the deity could watch the battle unfold.

The major deities of the Mesopotamian pantheon, which included the Anunnaki, were believed to participate in the "assembly of the gods", through which the gods made all of their decisions. This assembly was seen as a divine counterpart to the semi-democratic legislative system that existed during the Third Dynasty of Ur (c. 2112 BCE – c. 2004 BCE).

== Mythology ==
=== Sumerian ===
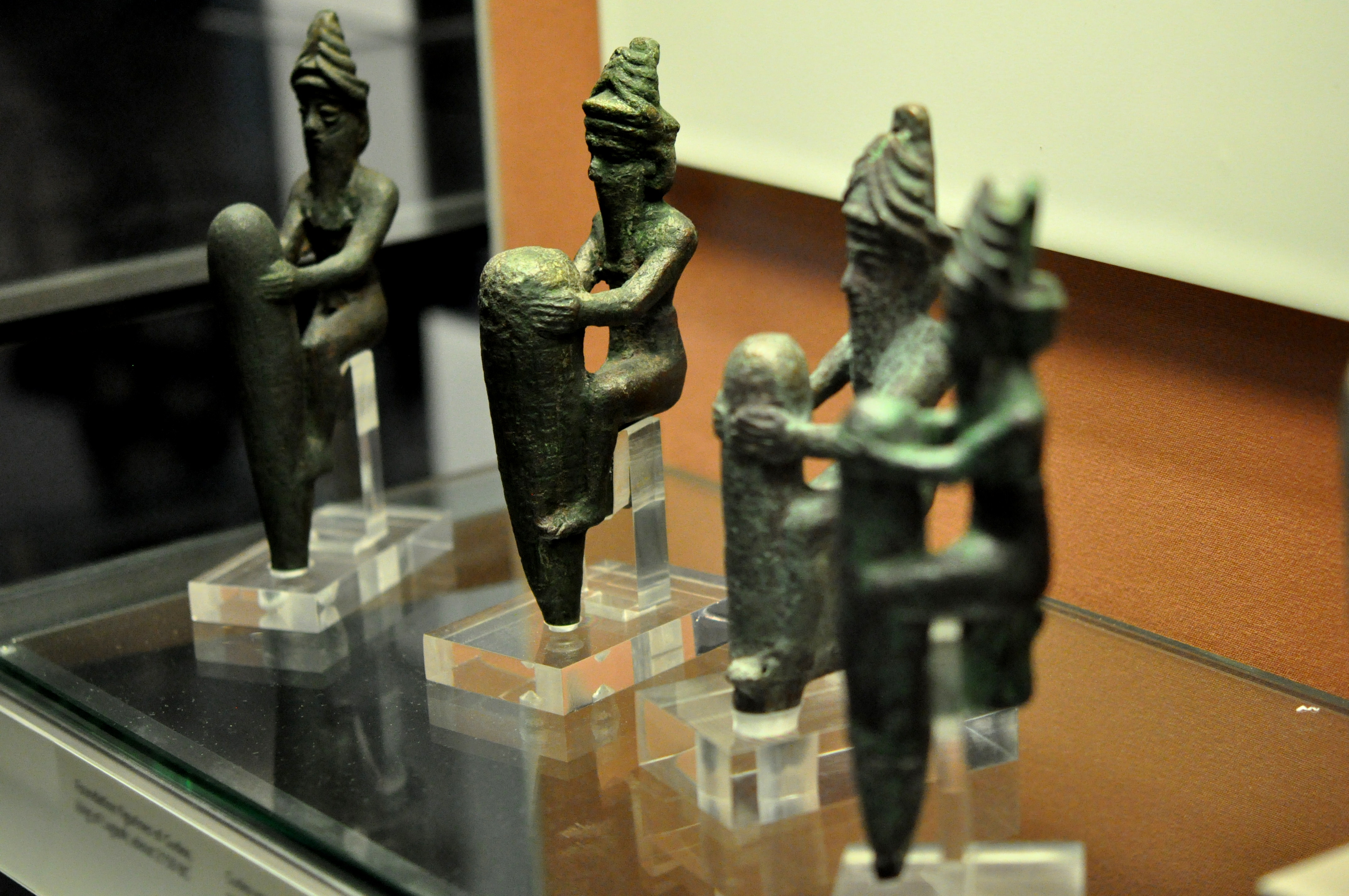
Four copper-alloy foundation figures depicting ancient Mesopotamian gods wearing characteristic horned crowns (c. 2130 BCE)

The earliest known usages of the term Anunnaki come from inscriptions written during the reign of Gudea (c. 2144–2124 BCE) and the Third Dynasty of Ur. In the earliest texts, the term is applied to the most powerful and important deities in the Sumerian pantheon: the descendants of the sky-god An.This group of deities probably included the "seven gods who decree": An, Enlil, Enki, Ninhursag, Nanna, Utu, and Inanna.

Although certain deities are described as members of the Anunnaki, no complete list of the names of all the Anunnaki has survived and they are usually only referred to as a cohesive group in literary texts. Sumerian texts describe the Anunnaki inconsistently and do not agree on how many Anunnaki there were, or what their divine function was. Originally, the Anunnaki appear to have been heavenly deities with immense powers. In the poem Enki and the World Order, the Anunnaki "do homage" to Enki, sing hymns of praise in his honor, and "take up their dwellings" among the people of Sumer. The same composition twice states that the Anunnaki "decree the fates of mankind".

Virtually every major deity in the Sumerian pantheon was regarded as the patron of a specific city and was expected to protect that city's interests. The deity was believed to permanently reside within that city's temple. One text mentions as many as fifty Anunnaki associated with the city of Eridu. In Inanna's Descent into the Underworld, there are only seven Anunnaki, who reside within the Underworld and serve as judges. Inanna stands trial before them for her attempt to take over the Underworld; they deem her guilty of hubris and condemn her to death.

Major deities in Sumerian mythology were associated with specific celestial bodies. Inanna was believed to be the planet Venus. Utu was believed to be the sun. Nanna was the moon. An was identified with all the stars of the equatorial sky, Enlil with those of the northern sky, and Enki with those of the southern sky. The path of Enlil's celestial orbit was a continuous, symmetrical circle around the north celestial pole, but those of An and Enki were believed to intersect at various points.

=== Akkadian, Babylonian and Assyrian ===
Reverence begets favour, sacrifice prolongs life, and prayer atones for guilt. He who fears the gods is not slighted by [...] He who fears the Anunnaki extends [his days].

— Babylonian hymn

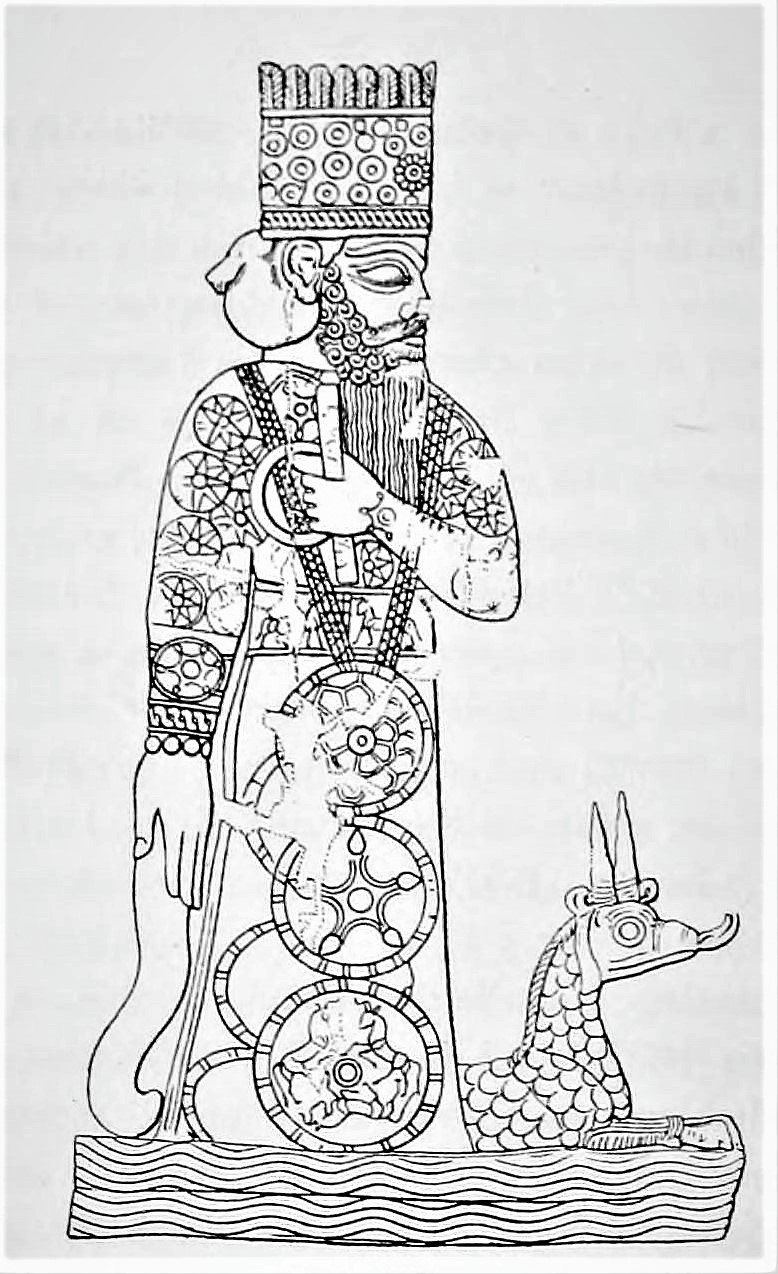
A Babylonian representation of the national god Marduk, who the Babylonians and Assyrians envisioned as a prominent member of the Anunnaki

Akkadian texts of the second millennium BCE follow similar portrayals of the Anunnaki from Inanna's Descent into the Netherworld, depicting them as chthonic Underworld deities. In an abbreviated Akkadian version of Inanna's Descent written in the early second millennium, Ereshkigal, the queen of the Underworld, comments that she "drink[s] water with the Anunnaki". Later in the same poem, Ereshkigal orders her servant Namtar to fetch the Anunnaki from Egalgina, to "decorate the threshold steps with coral", and to "seat them on golden thrones".

During the Old Babylonian Period (c. 1830 BCE – c. 1531 BCE), a new set of deities known as the Igigi are introduced. The relationship between the Anunnaki and the Igigi is unclear. On some occasions, the categories appear to be used synonymously, but in other writings, such as The Poem of Erra, there is a clear distinction between the two. In the late Akkadian Atra-Hasis epic, the Igigi are the sixth generation of the gods who are forced to perform labor for the Anunnaki. After forty days, the Igigi rebel and the god Enki, one of the Anunnaki, creates humans to replace them.

From the Middle Babylonian Period (c. 1592 – 1155 BCE) onward, the name Anunnaki was applied generally to the deities of the underworld; whereas the name Igigi was applied to the heavenly deities. During this period, the underworld deities Damkina, Nergal, and Madānu are listed as the most powerful among the Anunnaki, alongside Marduk, the national god of ancient Babylon.

In the standard Akkadian Epic of Gilgamesh (c. 1200 BCE) Utnapishtim, the immortal survivor of the Great Flood, describes the Anunnaki as seven judges of the Underworld, who set the land aflame as the storm approaches. Later, when the flood comes, Ishtar (the East Semitic equivalent to Inanna) and the Anunnaki mourn over the destruction of humanity.

In the Babylonian Enûma Eliš, Marduk assigns the Anunnaki their positions. A late Babylonian version of the epic mentions 600 Anunnaki of the underworld, but only 300 Anunnaki of heaven, indicating the existence of a complex underworld cosmology. In gratitude, the Anunnaki, the "Great Gods", build Esagila, a "splendid" temple dedicated to Marduk, Ea, and Ellil. In the eighth-century BCE Poem of Erra, the Anunnaki are described as the brothers of the god Nergal and are depicted as antagonistic towards humanity.

A badly damaged text from the Neo-Assyrian Period (911 – 612 BCE) describes Marduk leading his army of Anunnaki into the sacred city of Nippur and causing a disturbance. The disturbance causes a flood, which forces the resident gods of Nippur to take shelter in the Eshumesha temple to Ninurta. Enlil is enraged at Marduk's transgression and orders the gods of Eshumesha to take Marduk and the other Anunnaki as prisoners. The Anunnaki are captured, but Marduk appoints his front-runner Mushteshirhablim to lead a revolt against the gods of Eshumesha and sends his messenger Neretagmil to alert Nabu, the god of literacy.

When the Eshumesha gods hear Nabu speak, they come out of their temple to search for him. Marduk defeats the Eshumesha gods and takes 360 of them as prisoners of war, including Enlil himself. Enlil protests that the Eshumesha gods are innocent, so Marduk puts them on trial before the Anunnaki. The text ends with a warning from Damkianna (another name for Ninhursag) to the gods and to humanity, pleading them not to repeat the war between the Anunnaki and the gods of Eshumesha.

=== Hurrian and Hittite ===
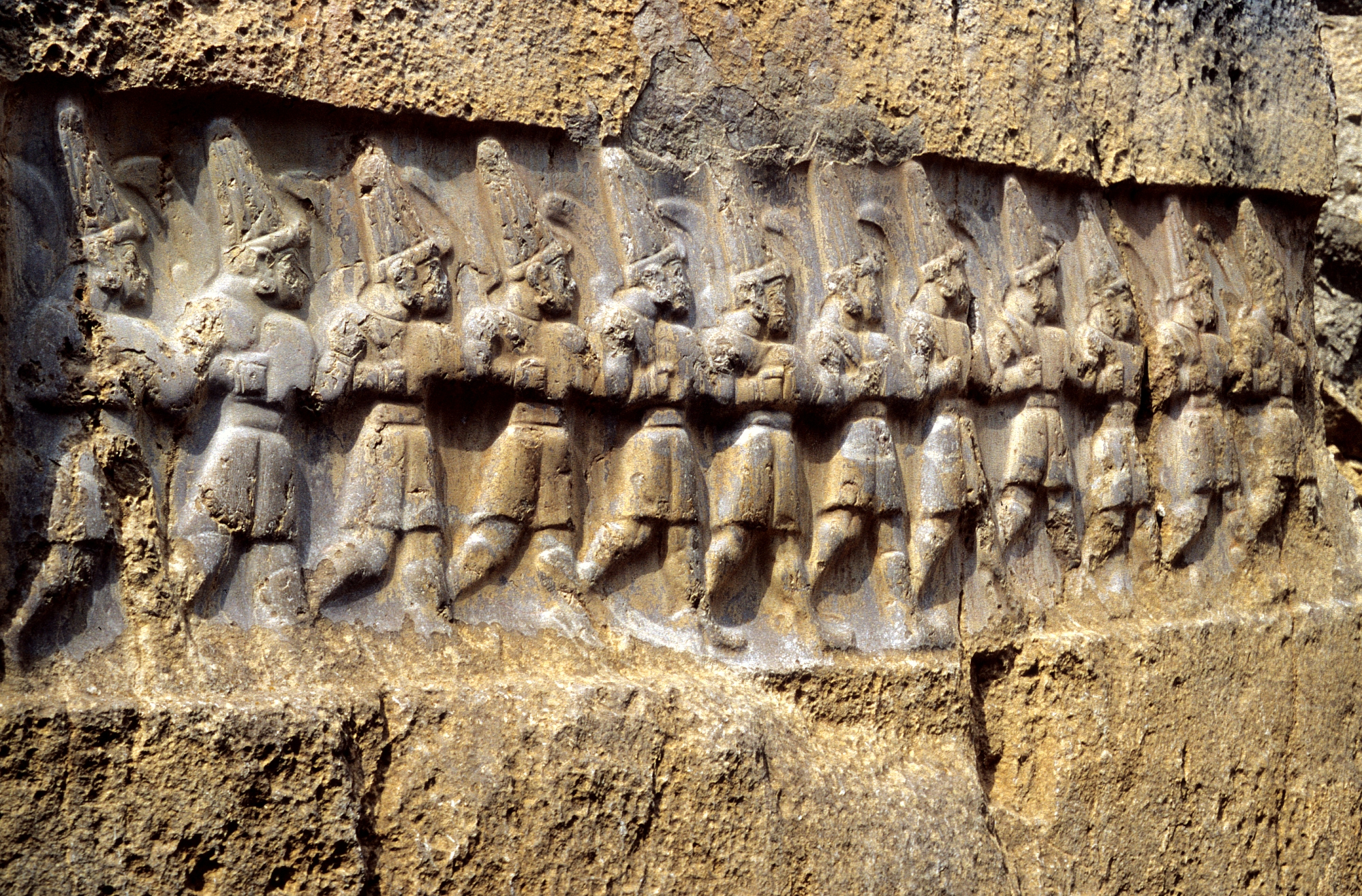
An Ancient Hittite relief carving from Yazılıkaya, a sanctuary at Hattusa, depicting twelve gods of the underworld, whom the Hittites identified as the Mesopotamian Anunnaki

In the mythologies of the Hurrians and Hittites (which flourished in the mid to late second millennium BCE), the oldest generation of gods was believed to have been banished by the younger gods to the Underworld, where they were ruled by the goddess Lelwani. Hittite scribes identified these deities with the Anunnaki. In ancient Hurrian, the Anunnaki are referred to as karuileš šiuneš, which means "former ancient gods", or kattereš šiuneš, which means "gods of the earth".

Hittite and Hurrian treaties were often sworn by the old gods in order to ensure that the oaths would be kept. In one myth, the gods are threatened by the stone giant Ullikummi, so Ea (the later name for Enki) commands the Former Gods to find the weapon that was used to separate the heavens from the earth. They find it and use it to cut off Ullikummi's feet.

Although the names of the Anunnaki in Hurrian and Hittite texts frequently vary, they are always eight in number. In one Hittite ritual, the names of the old gods are listed as: "Aduntarri the diviner, Zulki the dream interpretess, Irpitia Lord of the Earth, Narā, Namšarā, Minki, Amunki, and Āpi." The old gods had no identifiable cult in the Hurrio-Hittite religion; instead, the Hurrians and Hittites sought to communicate with the old gods through the ritual sacrifice of a piglet in a pit dug in the ground. The old gods were often invoked to perform ritual purifications.

The Hittite account of the old gods' banishment to the Underworld is closely related with the Greek poet Hesiod's narrative of the overthrow of the Titans by the Olympians in his Theogony. The Greek sky-god Ouranos (whose name means "Heaven") is the father of the Titans and is derived from the Hittite version of Anu. In Hesiod's account, Ouranos is castrated by his son Cronus, just as Anu was castrated by his son Kumarbi in the Hittite story.

== Pseudoarchaeology and conspiracy theories ==
Over a series of published books (starting with Chariots of the Gods? in 1968), pseudoarchaeologist Erich von Däniken claimed that extraterrestrial "ancient astronauts" had visited a prehistoric Earth. Däniken explains the origins of religions as reactions to contact with an alien race, and offers interpretations of Sumerian texts and the Old Testament as evidence.

In his 1976 book The Twelfth Planet, author Zecharia Sitchin claimed that the Anunnaki were actually an advanced humanoid extraterrestrial species from the undiscovered planet Nibiru, who came to Earth around 500,000 years ago and constructed a base of operations in order to mine gold after discovering that the planet was rich in the precious metal. According to Sitchin, the Anunnaki hybridized their species and Homo erectus via in vitro fertilization in order to create humans as a slave species of miners. Sitchin claimed that the Anunnaki were forced to temporarily leave Earth's surface and orbit the planet when Antarctic glaciers melted, causing the Great Flood, which also destroyed the Anunnaki's bases on Earth. These had to be rebuilt, and the Anunnaki, needing more humans to help in this massive effort, taught mankind agriculture.

Ronald H. Fritze writes that, according to Sitchin, "the Annunaki built the pyramids and all the other monumental structures from around the ancient world that ancient astronaut theorists consider so impossible to build without highly advanced technologies". Sitchin expanded on this mythology in later works, including The Stairway to Heaven (1980) and The Wars of Gods and Men (1985). In The End of Days: Armageddon and the Prophecy of the Return (2007), Sitchin predicted that the Anunnaki would return to earth, possibly as soon as 2012, corresponding to the end of the Mesoamerican Long Count calendar. Sitchin's writings have been universally rejected by mainstream historians, who have labelled his books as pseudoarchaeology, asserting that Sitchin seems to deliberately misrepresent Sumerian texts by quoting them out of context, truncating quotations, and mistranslating Sumerian words to give them radically different meanings from their accepted definitions.

David Icke, the British conspiracy theorist who popularised the reptilian conspiracy theory, has claimed that the reptilian overlords of his theory are in fact the Anunnaki. Clearly influenced by Sitchin's writings, Icke adapts them "in favor of his own New Age and conspiratorial agenda". Icke's speculation on the Anunnaki incorporates far-right views on history, positing an Aryan master race descended by blood from the Anunnaki. It also incorporates dragons, Dracula, and draconian laws; these three elements apparently linked only by superficial linguistic similarity. He formulated his views on the Anunnaki in the 1990s and has written several books about his theory.

== See also ==
- Ancient Mesopotamian religion
- Vanir
- Deva (Hinduism)
- Dingir
- Elohim
- Hutena
- Eridu Genesis
- Epic of Gilgamesh
- Tuatha Dé Danann
- Twelve Olympians
