= Igigi =

Mythological beings of heaven in Sumerian mythology

Igigi are the mythological figures of heaven in the mythology of ancient Mesopotamia. Though sometimes synonymous with the term "Anunnaki", in the Atrahasis myth the Igigi were the younger beings who were servants of the Annunaki, until they rebelled and were replaced by the creation of humans.

== Etymology ==
The name has unknown origin. It was originally spelt i-gi_{4}-gi_{4}, but was later also written as í-gì-gì. This latter may have been a play on words, as in Sumerian, the combination can be interpreted as numerals adding to 7 (the number of Great Gods), or multiplying to 600 (which in some traditions was the total number of gods).

== Atra-Hasis ==
Akkadian Paradise is described as a garden in the myth of Atra-Hasis where lower rank deities (the Igigi) are put to work digging a watercourse by the more senior deities (the Anunnaki).

When the gods, man-like,
Bore the labour, carried the load,
The gods' load was great,
The toil grievous, the trouble excessive.
The great Anunnaku, the Seven,
Were making the Igigu undertake the toil.

The Igigi then rebel against the dictatorship of Enlil, setting fire to their tools and surrounding Enlil's great house by night. On hearing that toil on the irrigation channel is the reason for the disquiet, the Anunnaki council decide to create man to carry out agricultural labour.

== Functions and cult ==
The functions of the Igigi as a distinct group of deities are not clearly defined; their name occurs in personal theophoric names. Topographical texts mention Edur-kuga (E-dur-kuga, Sumerian é-dúr-kù-ga, “House of the Sacred Brick”), a sanctuary of the Igigi in Babylon, located in the district of TE.Eki.

== See also ==
- Gana
- Geshtu-E, a god of intelligence whose blood was used in the creation of mankind
- Grigori
- Seraphim
