= Mami (goddess) =

Goddess in the Babylonian epic Atra-Hasis

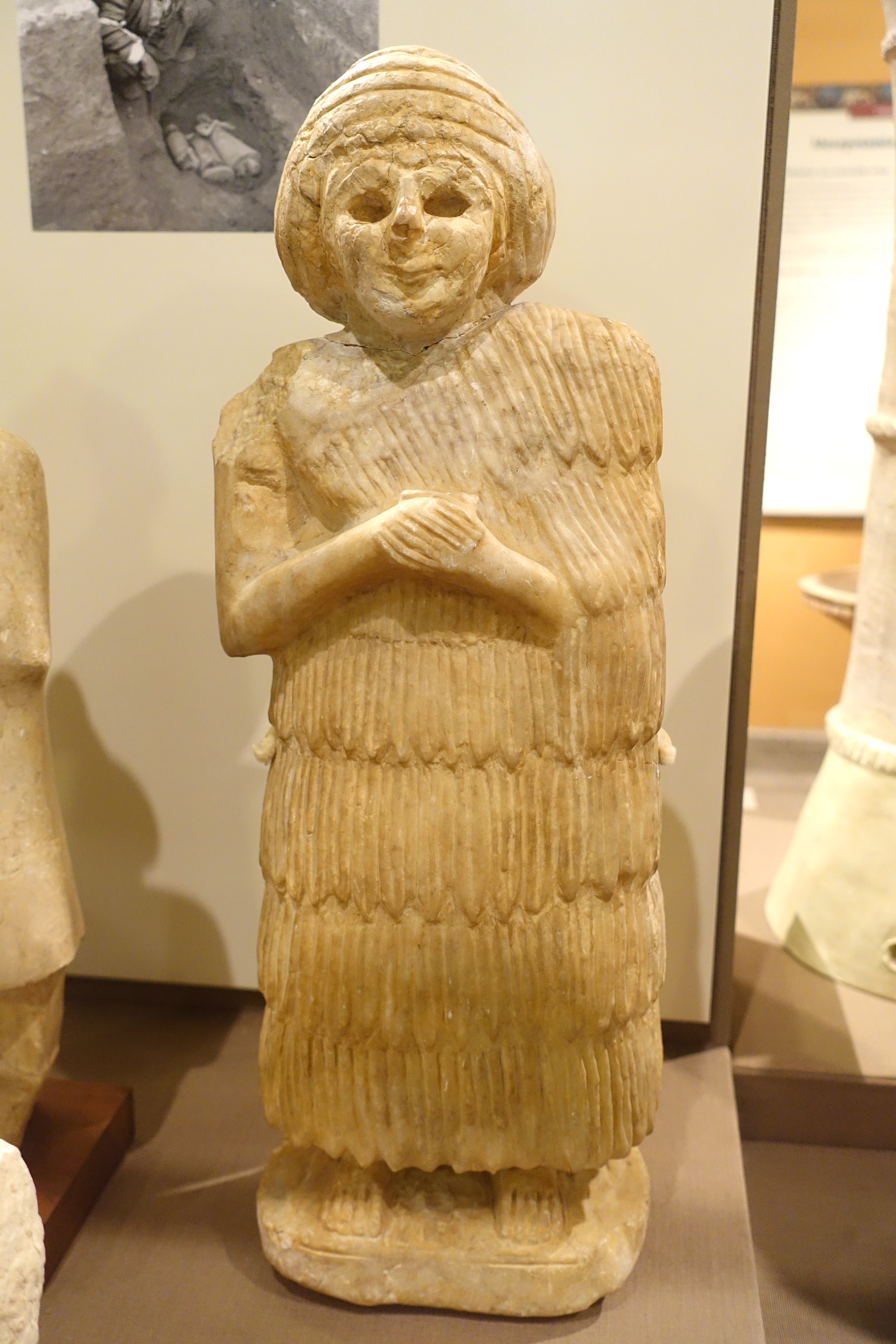
Gypsum statuette of a female worshipper from the temple of Nintu BC b P, dating to circa 2600-2500 BC

Mami, also known as Belet-ili, or Nintu, is a goddess in the Babylonian epic Atra-Hasis and in other creation legends. She was probably synonymous with Ninhursag. She was involved in the creation of humankind from clay and blood. As Nintu legends state she pinched off fourteen pieces of primordial clay which she formed into womb deities, seven on the left and seven on the right with a brick between them, who produced the first seven pairs of human embryos. She may have become Belet Ili ("Mistress of the Gods") when, at Enki's suggestion, the gods slew one among themselves and used that god's blood and flesh, mixed with clay, to create humankind.
