= Gilgamesh in the arts and popular culture =

Creative works inspired by the Epic of Gilgamesh

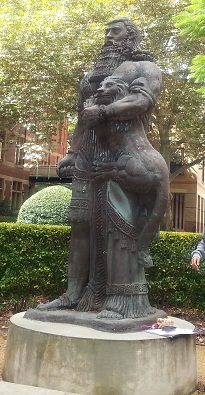
A modern statue of Gilgamesh stands at the University of Sydney.

The Epic of Gilgamesh has directly inspired many manifestations of literature, art, music, and popular culture throughout history. It was extremely influential during the Bronze Age and Iron Age in the Middle East, but gradually fell into obscurity during classical antiquity. The story was rediscovered in the 19th century, and began to regain popular recognition and influence in the 20th century.

== Overview ==
=== Ancient reception ===
According to historian Wolfgang Röllig, the Epic of Gilgamesh addressed many basic concerns and important themes of human culture such as creation, death, friendship, enmity, pride, arrogance, humility, and failure. These subjects have remained of importance to humans throughout time, explaining the story's impact and popularity. The Epic of Gilgamesh gradually emerged from the 3rd millennium BC as a collection of tales concerning the figure of Gilgamesh. These stories were eventually compiled into a single text by Sîn-lēqi-unninni, though different variants of the compilation continued to circulate. The best-known version of the compiled epic stems from the Neo-Assyrian Empire; this text is also the most important basis for the modern versions of the text. The epic was mainly spread by oral tradition which makes it difficult to gauge Gilgamesh's exact influence on popular culture in ancient times; however, written fragments of his tales were discovered across the Middle East, suggesting that different versions of the epic were widely circulated. It is also likely that tales about Gilgamesh influenced various other stories, including the Bible, Illiad, and Odyssey.

Even though the Epic of Gilgamesh was rather popular, it remained tied to Cuneiform and was seemingly never translated into languages using other writing systems such as Ancient Greek or Old Aramaic. Accordingly, the decline of Cuneiform coincided with the disappearance of Gilgamesh from public consciousness. The story was eventually rediscovered by archaeologists in the 19th century, and many of its elements and sub-stories gradually became popular subjects in arts and popular culture.

=== Reception after rediscovery ===
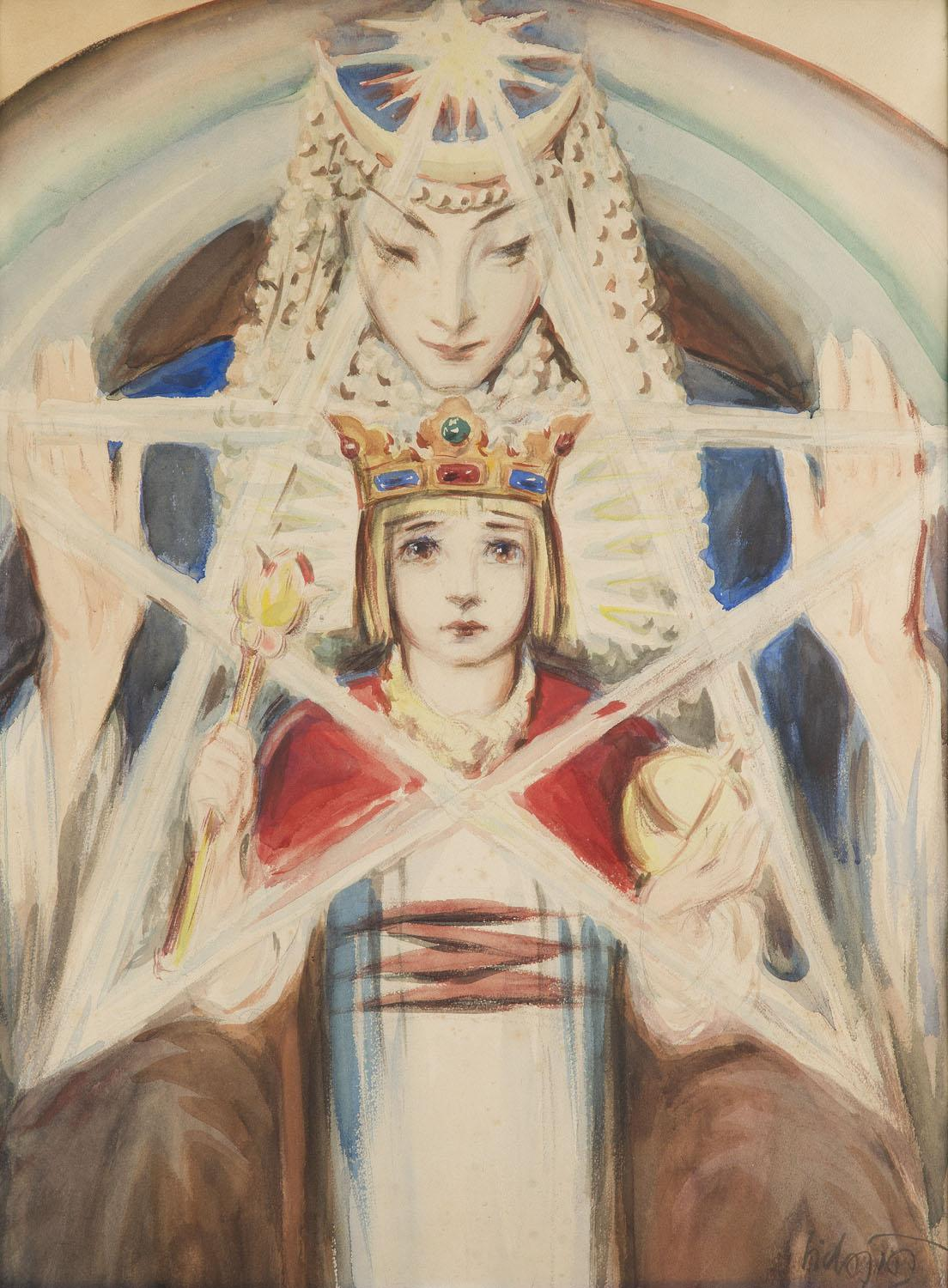
Ishtar with Gilgamesh, painting by Polish artist Kazimierz Sichulski

It was only during and after the First World War that the first reliable translations to modern languages of the epic appeared. For instance, the first German translation by Albert Schott was published in 1934. These translations were the first that reached a wide audience, and it was only after the Second World War that the epic of Gilgamesh began to make itself felt more broadly in a variety of genres. As identified by Theodore Ziolkowski in the book Gilgamesh Among Us: Modern Encounters With the Ancient Epic (2011), the epic became increasingly influential from this point onward. In the years following World War II, Gilgamesh, formerly an obscure figure known only by a few scholars, gradually became increasingly popular with modern audiences. The Epic of Gilgamesh's existential themes made it particularly appealing to German authors in the years following the war. In his 1947 existentialist novel Die Stadt hinter dem Strom, the German novelist Hermann Kasack adapted elements of the epic into a metaphor for the aftermath of the destruction of World War II in Germany, portraying the bombed-out city of Hamburg as resembling the frightening Underworld seen by Enkidu in his dream. In Hans Henny Jahnn's magnum opus River Without Shores (1949–1950), the middle section of the trilogy centers around a composer whose twenty-year-long homoerotic relationship with a friend mirrors that of Gilgamesh with Enkidu and whose masterpiece turns out to be a symphony about Gilgamesh.

The Quest of Gilgamesh, a 1953 radio play by Douglas Geoffrey Bridson, helped popularize the epic in Britain. In the United States, Charles Olson praised the epic in his poems and essays and Gregory Corso believed that it contained ancient virtues capable of curing what he viewed as modern moral degeneracy. The 1966 postfigurative novel Gilgamesch by Guido Bachmann became a classic of German "queer literature" and set a decades-long international literary trend of portraying Gilgamesh and Enkidu as homosexual lovers. This trend proved so popular that the Epic of Gilgamesh itself is included in The Columbia Anthology of Gay Literature (1998) as a major early work of that genre. In the 1970s and 1980s, feminist literary critics analyzed the Epic of Gilgamesh as showing evidence for a transition from the original matriarchy of all humanity to modern patriarchy. As the Green Movement expanded in Europe, Gilgamesh's story began to be seen through an environmentalist lens, with Enkidu's death symbolizing man's separation from nature.

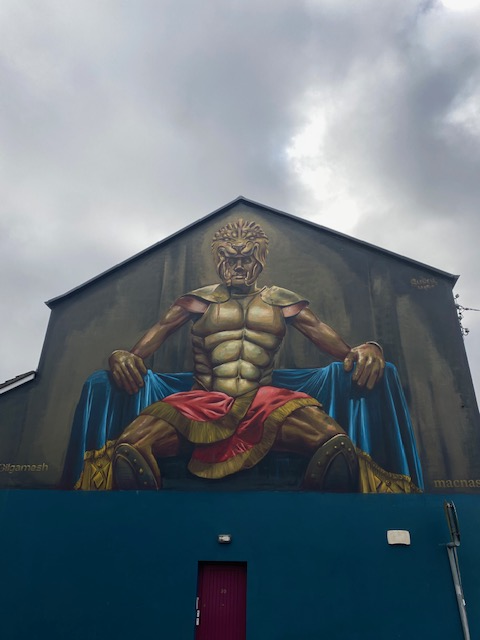
Gilgamesh mural in Galway, photographed in 2020

Theodore Ziolkowski, a scholar of modern literature, states, that "unlike most other figures from myth, literature, and history, Gilgamesh has established himself as an autonomous entity or simply a name, often independent of the epic context in which he originally became known. (As analogous examples one might think, for instance, of the Minotaur or Frankenstein's monster.)" The Epic of Gilgamesh has been translated into many major world languages and has become a staple of American world literature classes. Many contemporary authors and novelists have drawn inspiration from it, including an American avant-garde theater collective called "The Gilgamesh Group" and Joan London in her novel Gilgamesh (2001). The Great American Novel (1973) by Philip Roth features a character named "Gil Gamesh", who is the star pitcher of a fictional 1930s baseball team called the "Patriot League". Believing that he can never lose, Gil Gamesh throws a violent temper tantrum when an umpire goes against him and he is subsequently banished from baseball. He flees to the Soviet Union, where he is trained as a spy against the United States. Gil Gamesh reappears late in the novel as one of Joseph Stalin's spies and gives what American literary historian David Damrosch calls "an eerily casual description of his interrogation training in Soviet Russia." In 2000, a modern statue of Gilgamesh by the Assyrian sculptor Lewis Batros was unveiled at the University of Sydney in Australia.

Starting in the late twentieth century, the Epic of Gilgamesh began to be read again in Iraq. Saddam Hussein, the former President of Iraq, had a lifelong fascination with Gilgamesh. Hussein's first novel Zabibah and the King (2000) is an allegory for the Gulf War set in ancient Assyria that blends elements of the Epic of Gilgamesh and the One Thousand and One Nights. Like Gilgamesh, the king at the beginning of the novel is a brutal tyrant who misuses his power and oppresses his people, but, through the aid of a commoner woman named Zabibah, he grows into a more just ruler. When the United States overthrew him in 2003, Hussein gave a speech to a group of his generals posing the idea in a positive light by comparing himself to the epic hero.

== Literature ==
- The City beyond the River (1947) by Hermann Kasack. The epic becomes a metaphor for post-war Germany.
- River without Shores (1949–50) by Hans Henny Jahnn. The middle section is an analogy to the relationship between Gilgamesh and Enkidu.
- Charles Olson wrote about the epic in his essay "The Gate and the Center" and in such poems as "La Chute" and "Bigmans" (1950s and 60s).
- Gregory Corso, poems (1950s).
- The Time Masters (1953/1971) and Time Bomb by Wilson Tucker. The protagonist, Gilbert Nash, has a mysterious past.
- Gilgamesh: Romanzo (1959) by Gian Franco Gianfilippi. The first in a wave of historical novels based on the epic. A wave including works in Italian (Paola Capriola), English (Robert Silverberg, Stephan Grundy), German (Harold Braem, Thomas Mielke), French (Jacques Cassabois), and Spanish (José Ortega).
- Gilgamesch (1966) by Guido Bachmann. An early classic of a genre Germans called "queer literature", it would inspire other works that examined the idea of a possible homosexual relationship between Gilgamesh and Enkidu. Other works include: Denmark (Henrik Bjelke), Germany (Thomas Mielke, Christian Kracht), France (Jacques Cassabois), and England (Edwin Morgan).
- In The Great American Novel (1973), a novel by author Philip Roth, the Gilgamesh myth is reworked into the tale of a fictional baseball player, Gil Gamesh, whose immortal aspirations are achieved by disappearing after his final game.
- In Lucifer's Hammer by Larry Niven and Jerry Pournelle, Gilgamesh is used to set the early timeline of events.
- In The Magic Labyrinth (1980) by Philip Jose Farmer, Gilgamesh appears as minor character who, although he "disclaimed any of the adventures attributed to the mythical king of Uruk", enjoyed spinning tall tales "of his unrecorded exploits".
- Ölümsüzlük Ardında Gılgamış (Gilgamesh in Search of Immortality) (1981), a poetry book by Turkish poet Melih Cevdet Anday.
- Gilgamesh the King (1984) and To the Land of the Living (1986) by Robert Silverberg. Silverberg also contributed works of short fiction concerning Gilgamesh to the Heroes in Hell shared world series of Bangsian fantasy.
- Contact (1985) by Carl Sagan. Chapter 22 is titled "Gilgamesh". It describes the efforts made by Hadden in his pursuit of immortality.
- In the Skin of a Lion (1987) by Michael Ondaatje. The title is a quote from Gilgamesh.
- Timewyrm: Genesys (1991), by John Peel, is the first of the New Doctor Who Adventures published by Virgin. The book describes the Doctor meeting Gilgamesh, and relates the epic of Gilgamesh as a Doctor Who story.
- "Gilgamesh and the Homeboys" (1991), by Harry Turtledove, a time-displaced Gilgamesh meets Los Angeles street gangs. This short story was published in an obscure magazine and has never been reprinted as of 2018.
- How Like a God (1997) by Brenda Clough is based on the epic.
- In The Eternal Footman (1999) by James K. Morrow, a traveling troupe enacts a play based on the Gilgamesh canon.
- Gilgamesh (1999), historical fiction by Stephan Grundy which retells the legend.
- ghIlghameS (2000), a translation into the Klingon language. ISBN 1-58715-338-6
- In Jane Lindskold's Athanor novels (1998–99), Gilgamesh and Enkidu are immortals who inspire legends under other names, including King Arthur and Sir Bedivere, respectively.
- 1001 Nights of Bacchus (2000), a graphic novel by Eddie Campbell, features a six-page collage story in which Gilgamesh is a Scottish-accented soccer hooligan near-incomprehensibly recounting the entire epic. The story also appeared, in color, on the back covers of issues 22–26 of Campbell's Bacchus magazine.
- Gilgamesh (2001) by Joan London, a postfiguration in which the epic becomes the structural key for a world torn by politics and betrayal (modern Armenia).
- The novel 1979 (2001) by Christian Kracht, in which the epic provides the pattern for the homoerotic theme set against the background of the Iranian Revolution.
- Fate/stay night (2004), a Japanese visual novel written by Kinoko Nasu and developed by Type-Moon features Gilgamesh as a major antagonist. He serves as the primary antagonist of the Unlimited Blade Works route.
- Fate/Zero (2006), a light novel authored by Gen Urobuchi, illustrated by Takashi Takeuchi and written in collaboration with Type-Moon, features Gilgamesh as one of the summoned servants.
- Bartimaeus, the titular Djinn was a servant to Gilgamesh (his first master) and aided him alongside the wildman Enkidu in defeating the giant Humbaba in addition to also assisting the demi-God king in building the walls of Uruk, a feat originally attributed to Gilgamesh alone.
- Stargate SG-1: Blood Ties (2007) by Sonny Whitelaw and Elizabeth Christensen has Doctor Daniel Jackson consult the Epic of Gilgamesh for clues about the threat that the characters are currently facing.
- Like Mayflies in a Stream (2009) by Shauna S. Roberts (ISBN 978-0982514009) is a novelization of the first half of the epic from the viewpoint of Shamhat, who tamed Enkidu.
- The Sorceress: The Secrets of the Immortal Nicholas Flamel (2009), a novel in The Secrets of the Immortal Nicholas Flamel series by Michael Scott (ISBN 978-0-385-73529-2). Gilgamesh the King is described as a homeless man, immortal, and extraordinarily forgetful. He helps the twins, Sophie and Josh, to learn the magic of Water.
- "Long Time" by Rick Norwood, The Magazine of Fantasy and Science Fiction, January/February 2011, a retelling of the Gilgamesh legend by a cynical immortal soldier serving in Gilgamesh's army.
- Warm Bodies by Isaac Marion 2011. The Epic of Gilgamesh is mentioned as "one of the earliest known works of literature. Humanity's debut novel, you could say. Love, sex, blood and tears. A journey to find eternal life. To escape death."
- Fate/strange fake (2015), a Light Novel written by Ryōgo Narita, illustrated by Morii Shizuki, a spin-off of both Fate/stay night and Fate/Zero that originated as an April Fools' joke in 2008 as Fate/states night.
- In Children of Time (2015), a science fiction novel by Adrian Tchaikovsky, the main characters travel across space in a ship named the Gilgamesh.
- Fearless Inanna, by Jonathan Schork (2015), is loosely structured after the original epic in twelve "books" and borrows translated passages in chapter 10. The Standard Babylonian Epic of Gilgamesh by Simo Parpola (Eisenbrauns, 1997) is listed in the bibliography.
- Thick as Thieves (2017) by Megan Whalen Turner features a main character from a fictionalized version of the Persian empire who, throughout the course of the novel, recites from an ancient poem loosely based on the Epic of Gilgamesh. The two characters in the novel come to represent the main characters of the epic, known as Immakuk and Ennikar (Gilgamesh and Enkidu).
- City of the Plague God (2021) a fantasy novel by Sarwat Chadda under the Rick Riordan Presents imprint, features protagonist Sikander "Sik" Aziz meeting Gilgamesh in the present day where Gilgamesh reveals that he really did become immortal, but had lied in the Epic of Gilgamesh and faked his death in order to keep other people from discovering the secret of immortality. Gilgamesh has become a pacifist dedicated to gardening and helps Sik create a cure for the plague spread by the Mesopotamian deity Nergal. Using his powers as the demigod son of Ninsun, Gilgamesh generates a hurricane over Manhattan for Sik to spread the cure in the form of rain. He later sends Sik his royal seal as a gift.
- "There Are Rivers in the Sky" (2024) a novel by Elif Shafak interweaves the stories of three characters living along two rivers - the Thames and the Tigris - all connected by the ancient poem, the "Epic of Gilgamesh".
- Mesopotamian Tales (2025) a novel by Steven Anthony George is a reimagining of the epic poem set in the United States in 1995.

== Classical music ==
- The Epic of Gilgamesh, 1955 choral work by the Czech composer Bohuslav Martinů
- Gilgamesh, 1962–1964 Turkish language opera by Nevit Kodallı
- Gilgamesh, 1964–1970 Turkish language opera by Ahmet Adnan Saygun
- Gilgamesh, 1971–72 Danish language opera by Per Nørgård
- Gilgamesh, 1986 Serbian language opera by Rudolf Brucci
- Gilgamesh, 1992 Italian language opera by Franco Battiato
- Bilgamesh, 2009–2012 opera-ballet in Sumerian and Akkadian by Ashot Ariyan
- ABUBU – The Great Flood, 2023 oratorio by Enjott Schneider
- Gilgamesh, 2024 opera by Sydney Chamber Opera

== Pop music ==
- Girugamesh, name of Japanese rock band is a transliteration of Gilgamesh, some of their song names allude to the epic as well.
- "The Mesopotamians", a song by They Might Be Giants, features Gilgamesh, along with Sargon, Hammurabi, and Ashurbanipal (other rulers of Mesopotamia).
- He Who Saw the Deep, an album by iLiKETRAiNS, takes its title from an original styling of The Epic of Gilgamesh.
- "Gilgamesh", from the album Rapconteur by rapper Baba Brinkman is a modern retelling of the epic in hip hop form.
- Gilgamesh, 2010 album from Australian alternative pop duo Gypsy & The Cat.
- Gilgamesh, 2015 album based on the epic by the Iraqi heavy metal band Acrassicauda.
- "Gilgameš", from the album Κατά τον δαίμονα εαυτού by extreme metal band Rotting Christ.
- "Golem II: The Bionic Vapour Boy" from the album California by Mike Patton's band Mr. Bungle mentions Gilgamesh.
- Gilgamesh, name of British jazz fusion band in the 1970s.
- "The Edge of the World", from the album Reaching into Infinity by English power metal band DragonForce.
- "Gilgamesh", from the 2020 album Ascension by American singer Sufjan Stevens.
- Lost in the Cedar Wood, the 2021 album by British singer-songwriter Johnny Flynn and British nature writer Robert Macfarlane, is loosely based on the Epic of Gilgamesh, aiming to compare the themes of the ancient work with the modern world in the context of the COVID-19 pandemic.

== Theatre ==
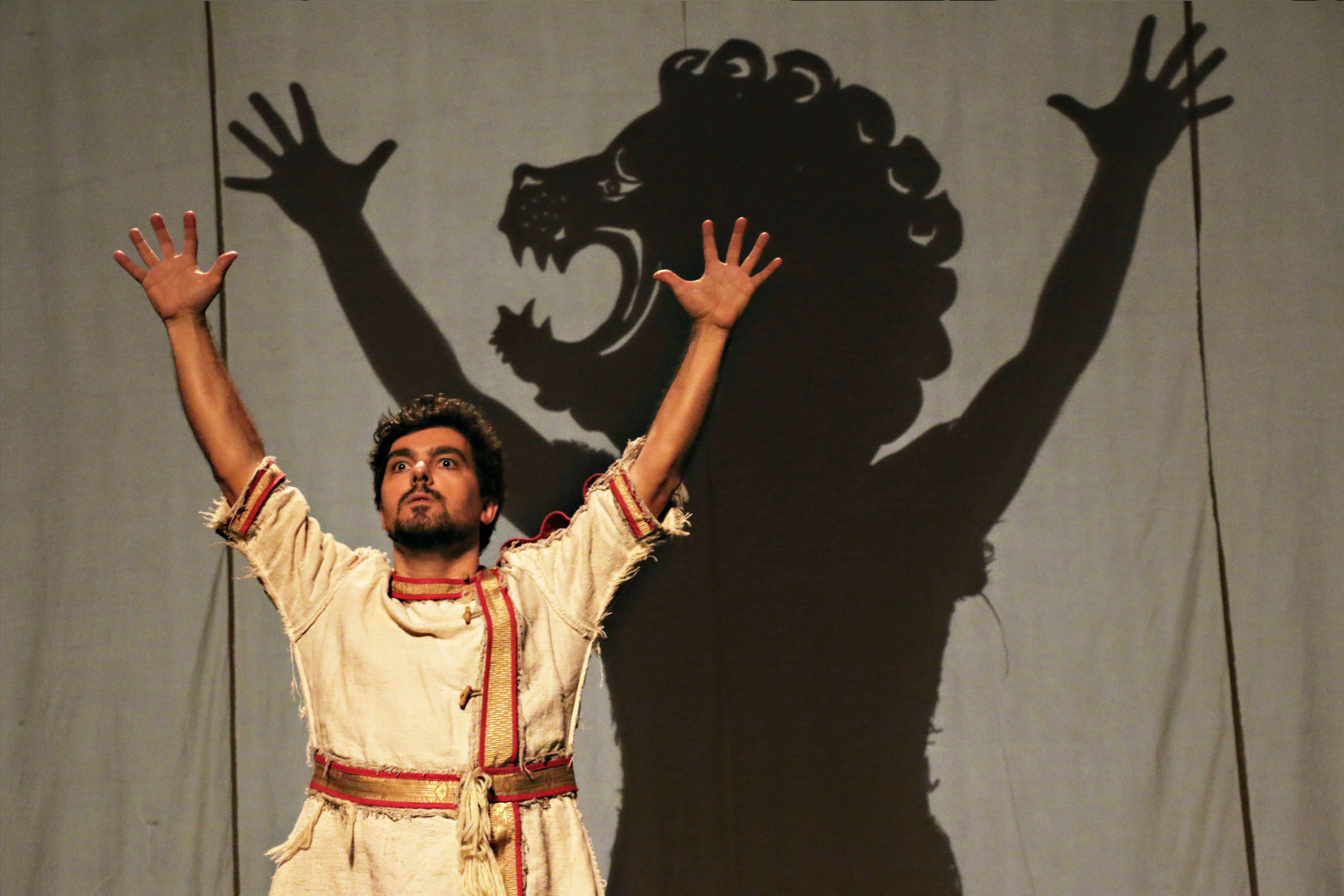
Scene of the German theatre play Gilgamesh by René Clemencic and Kristine Tornquist, performed in 2015

- 1988 Girugameshu, a play by the Japanese scholar Takeshi Umehara. Inspired Hayao Miyazaki's 1997 anime epic Princess Mononoke.
- 1989 Turn left at Gilgamesh, a play by New York playwright Rory Winston.
- 1990 Gilgamesh, adapted by Bryan Nason, performed in Ashgrove quarry.
- 2007 (September/October). Gilgamesh in Uruk: GI in Iraq, adapted by Blake Bowden. Directed by Regina Pugh, with original music composed by Grammy-nominee, Steve Goers, and original puppetry by Aretta Baumgartner.
- 2007 (July). Chronicles – the custom of lamenting, based on the adaptation and completed Polish translation of Gilgamesh by Robert Stiller. Directed by Grzegorz Brai with original music based on Albanian and Greek polyphonic laments. Produced by Song of the Goat Theatre in Poland.
- 2007 (April). Gilgamesh, adapted by Yusef Komunyakaa and Chad Gracia. Original music composed and performed by Billy Atwell. This project was a part of the New York Institute for the Humanities War Music Festival. Produced by the Classical Theatre of Harlem.
- 2007 (March/April). Gilgamesh, adapted by Stephen Sachs. Directed by Sachs and Jessica Kubzansky. Produced by The Theatre @ Boston Court in Pasadena, California.
- 2017 (October). Gilgamesh, adapted by Piers Beckley. Directed by Ray Shell. Produced by White Bear Theatre in Kennington, London.
- 2017 (October). Broken Stones, by Fin Kennedy. Directed by Seth Rozin. Produced by Interact Theatre Companyin Philadelphia. Inspired by a true story, this meta-theatrical play follows a former U.S. Army Reservist who broke military protocol to safeguard the Baghdad Museum of Antiquities (the Iraq Museum) from being looted during the Iraq War. This museum houses Gilgamesh tablets, and the story references Gilgamesh. As the ex-soldier tells his harrowing saga to a Hollywood ghost writer, his story is manipulated into a more palatable narrative.

== Film ==
- Gilgames (1976), directed by András Rajnai for Hungarian television.
- The Epic of Gilgamesh, or This Unnameable Little Broom (1985) by the Quay Brothers is an animated short based on the Epic of Gilgamesh.
- Gilgamesh is a major character in the visual novel Fate/stay night and its adaptations.
- Hayao Miyazaki's 1997 anime film Princess Mononoke is partially based on the Cedar Forest episode of The Epic of Gilgamesh.
- Gilgamesh (2011), adaptation of the Epic of Gilgamesh by Danish director Peter Ringgaard as a 57-minute short film, starring Moroccan actors Yassine Ahajjam as Gilgamesh and Rabie Kati as Enkidu.
- Where Is Gilgamesh? (2024), Kurdish feature film based on the Epic of Gilgamesh, directed by Karzan Kardozi and filmed in Iraqi Kurdistan.

== Television ==
- Gilgamesh is referenced, as a supposed legendary version of the main character, in both the prologue and epilogue of the 1964 episode of The Outer Limits, "Demon With a Glass Hand".
- Gilgamesh appears in an episode of Hercules: The Legendary Journeys played by Tony Todd.
- "Darmok", episode 2 of season 5 of Star Trek: The Next Generation, is a self-referential adaptation of Gilgamesh in a science fiction setting. Jean-Luc Picard references the epic directly as he attempts to communicate with a member of an alien species whose language consists entirely of allegory which references mythological and historical people and events from his culture.
- Gilgamesh anime, directed by Masahiko Murata.
- The Epic is seen in the animated series The Secret Saturdays, though with some alterations. Instead of telling the story of Gilgamesh's quest for immortality, it depicts his battle against an ancient Sumerian cryptid known as Kur.

== Comics ==
- Gilgamesh II, a satirical graphic novel by Jim Starlin in which an infant (the last of his doomed race) is rocketed to Earth Superman-fashion, but whose life follows the trajectory of the Gilgamesh legends.
- The Epic of Gilgamesh (2018), is a graphic novel covering the full Gilgamesh epic; rendered by Kent H. Dixon and illustrated by his son, Kevin H. Dixon.
- In the final issue of Mage II: The Hero Defined (1999), Matt Wagner uses the Epic of Gilgamesh as a parallel to the life of Kevin Matchstick, who was previously compared to King Arthur.
- The Argentine comic book Gilgamesh the Immortal turns Gilgamesh into an immortal whose life spans across all human history and a post-apocalyptic future.
- In Marvel Comics Gilgamesh is one of the Eternals, a race of immortal beings that live on Olympia and have been mistaken for gods over the millennia. Gilgamesh has performed many heroic feats, and has been mistaken for other heroes, such as Hercules. He is known as the Forgotten One after Zuras, the leader of the Eternals, caused everybody on Earth to forget about him.
- The webcomic Abominable Charles Cristopher by Karl Kerschl features Gilgamesh as an adventurous king, who is initially trying to slay the unwitting protagonist when he approaches Gilgamesh's kingdom. Later their relationship evolves.
- The Unwritten by Mike Carey and Peter Gross, issue 32.5 (February 2012), retells part of the Epic in a way that fits the series' examination of story-telling in human history.
- Archer and Armstrong #0, written by Fred Van Lente and published by Valiant Comics features a retelling of the Epic of Gilgamesh from the point of view of one of the principal characters of the series, the immortal Aram Anni-Padda.

== Video games ==
- In Namco's action role-playing game Tower of Druaga, Gilgamesh is known as Gil and is the main hero who must ascend the floors of Druaga's tower to rescue Ki. The game spawned the Babylonian Castle Saga franchise.
- The pre-designed game packaged with Electronic Arts' Adventure Construction Set, Rivers of Light, follows the Epic of Gilgamesh.
- In Serious Sam: The Second Encounter, the eighth level was named as "Courtyards of Gilgamesh".
- The Final Fantasy series of video games includes, in some of its installments, a boss enemy named Gilgamesh and his "faithful sidekick" Enkidu. There are actually several variants of Gilgamesh in Final Fantasy, as the series has no shared in-universe continuity, though there is usually some reference to him being a fierce warrior who collects swords and many iterations of him have as many as six arms.
- Gilgamesh is the leader of the Sumerian civilization in the Civilization III Conquests expansion pack, Civilization IV Beyond the Sword expansion pack, and Civilization VI.
- In Namco's video game Tales of Phantasia, one of Cress Albaine's titles is Gilgamesh, which can be obtained finding particular objects.
- In Capcom's video game Devil May Cry 4 Gilgamesh is a pair of boots and gauntlets that are worn and used by second protagonist Dante, possibly in reference to a similar weapon featured in earlier games in the series, named after Beowulf, another epic poem.
- In the Sir-Tech game Wizardry: Proving Grounds of the Mad Overlord, players construct their adventure party at Gilgamesh's Tavern.
- In the Type-Moon visual novel game Fate/stay night, Gilgamesh is one of the antagonists of the series. He also appears in the sequel game, Fate/hollow ataraxia, as both his main self and as a child version of himself; and in "Fate/Extra CCC" and Fate/Extella: The Umbral Star as a playable character.
  - In the mobile game Fate/Grand Order, Gilgamesh appears as a summonable servant in three different variants: as a child, in his Fate/Stay Night form prior to meeting Enkidu, and a wiser version from his time as king after the conclusion of The Epic. He is one of the main protagonists in the game's Seventh Singularity, which takes place in Ancient Mesopotamia, the arcade version of the game also has a Babylonian singularity, in which Gilgamesh is cloned and Nebuchadnezzar II is summoned into his clone's body by the Beast of 666.
  - Gilgamesh also appears as a Ruler-class servant in Fate/Samurai Remnant.
- In the Japanese collectible card game Shadowverse, Gilgamesh is an uncommon playable card.
- In the 2015 WonderPlanet inc. mobile-game Crash Fever, Gilgamesh is an obtainable unit in an ultimate wizard quest.
- In Assassin's Creed: Origins (2017), a sword originated from Mesopotamia known as "Humbaba's Fang" was carved by Gilgamesh from the tooth of Humbaba.
- In Assassin's Creed Mirage (2024), the protagonist has an eagle companion named Enkidu.
- In Hades (2020), the fourth aspect of the Twin Fists of Malphon is the Aspect of Gilgamesh.
- In Smite, the second 2021 Babylonian god is Gilgamesh, who battles Tiamat in the story.

== Children's literature ==
- Gilgamesh. (1967). Written and illustrated by Bernarda Bryson. Henry Holt & Co. ISBN 0-03-055610-4. 1st edition is out of print.
- Inkydoo, the Wild Boy. (1976) Written by Andrew Sinclair. London, Abelard Schuman, 1976.
- Gilgamesh: Man's First Story (2005). Written and illustrated by Bernarda Bryson Shahn. Whole Spirit Press ISBN 1-892857-01-4, 2nd edition reissue.
- Gilgamesh the King (1991). Written and illustrated by Ludmila Zeman. Tundra Books. ISBN 978-0-88776-283-3 (0-88776-283-2).
- The Revenge of Ishtar (1993). Written and illustrated by Ludmila Zeman. Tundra Books. ISBN 978-0-88776-315-1 (0-88776-315-4).
- The Last Quest of Gilgamesh (1995). Written and illustrated by Ludmila Zeman. Tundra Books. ISBN 978-0-88776-328-1 (0-88776-328-6).
- Gilgamesh the Hero (2003). Retold by Geraldine McCaughrean, illustrated by David Parkins. Eerdmans Books for Young Readers. ISBN 0-8028-5262-9.
- Lugalbanda: The Boy who got Caught up in a War (2006). by Kathy Henderson, illustrated by Jane Ray. Candlewick. ISBN 0-7636-2782-8.

== Bibliography ==
- Damrosch, David (2006), The Buried Book: The Loss and Rediscovery of the Great Epic of Gilgamesh, New York City, New York: Henry Holt and Company, ISBN 978-0-8050-8029-2
- Röllig, Wolfgang (2009), Das Gilgamesh-Epos [The Epic of Gilgamesh] (in German), Stuttgart: Reclam, ISBN 978-3-15-018686-2
- Stone, D. (2012), "The Epic of Gilgamesh: Statue brings ancient tale to life" (PDF), MUSE, no. 12/2781, p. 28, archived from the original (PDF) on 29 May 2018
- Ziolkowski, Theodore (2012), Gilgamesh among Us: Modern Encounters with the Ancient Epic, Ithaca, New York and London, England: Cornell University Press, ISBN 978-0-8014-5035-8
