= Epic of Gilgamesh (disambiguation) =

The Epic of Gilgamesh is an epic poem from ancient Mesopotamia.

Epic of Gilgamesh may also refer to:

- The Epic of Gilgamesh (Martinů), 1955 oratorio by Bohuslav Martinů
- The Epic of Gilgamesh, or This Unnameable Little Broom, 1985 stop motion short film
- The Epic of Gilgamesh, a 2005 album by Abed Azrie

== See also ==
- Gilgamesh (disambiguation)
- List of characters in Epic of Gilgamesh
- Gilgamesh and Aga, an earlier version of the epic
- Gilgamesh: A New English Version, a 2004 translation of the epic by Stephen Mitchell
