= Gilgamesh (disambiguation) =

Gilgamesh was a legendary king of Uruk.

Gilgamesh may also refer to:

- Epic of Gilgamesh, a poem about a legendary king of Uruk

== Fictional characters ==
- Gilgamesh, the protagonist of the Babylonian Castle Saga video game franchise
- Gilgamesh (Final Fantasy), a character in the Final Fantasy video game series
- Gilgamesh (Fate/stay night), a character in the Fate franchise
- Gilgamesh (Marvel Comics) or Forgotten One, an Eternal in the Marvel Comics universe
- Gilgamesh (Devil May Cry), a demon from Devil May Cry 5

== Literature ==
- Gilgamesh (novel), a 2001 novel by Joan London
- Gilgamesh (manga) a manga and anime by Shotaro Ishinomori
- Gilgamesh the King, 1984 historical novel by Robert Silverberg

== Music ==
- Gilgamesh (band), a jazz fusion band in the 1970s
- Gilgamesh (Martinů) or The Epic of Gilgamesh, a 1955 choral work by Bohuslav Martinů
- Gilgamesh, a 2023 song by King Gizzard & the Lizard Wizard from The Silver Cord.

=== Operas ===
- Gilgamesh (Kodallı opera) (1962–1964)
- Gilgamesh (Saygun opera) (1964–1970)
- Gilgamesh (Nørgård opera) (1971–72)
- Gilgamesh (Brucci opera) (1986)
- Gilgamesh, a 1992 opera by Franco Battiato

=== Albums ===
- Gilgamesh (Acrassicauda album) (2015)
- Gilgamesh (Gilgamesh album) (1975)
- Gilgamesh, a 2010 album by Gypsy & The Cat

== Organizations ==
- Gilgamesh Pharmaceuticals, a psychedelic pharmaceutical company

== Other uses ==
- Gilgamesh (restaurant), a restaurant in London
- Gilgamesh, a crater on Ganymede
- 1812 Gilgamesh, a small asteroid

== See also ==
- Epic of Gilgamesh (disambiguation)
- Gilgamesh flood myth
- Gilgamesh in the arts and popular culture
- Gilgamesh II, a miniseries published by DC Comics
- Gilgamesh Night, a softcore porn Japanese variety TV show broadcast from 1991 to 1998
- Gilgamesh Wulfenbach, a character in Girl Genius
- Girugamesh, a Japanese rock/metal band
