= Shauna S. Roberts =

American novelist

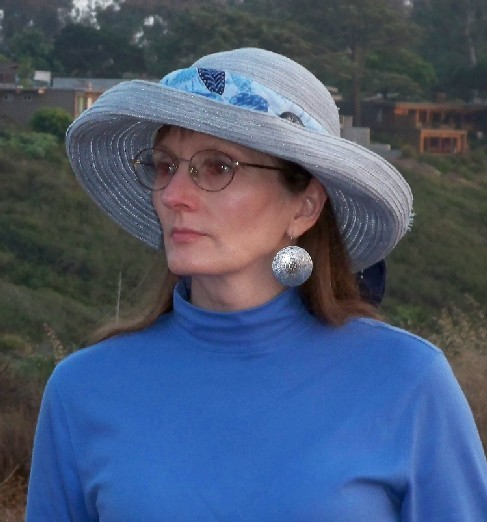
- Roberts at the Clarion Writers Workshop, 2009
- Born: September 17, 1956 (age 69); Beavercreek, Ohio, U.S.

Shauna S. Roberts (born September 17, 1956) is an American science fiction author, science writer and medical writer.

== Early life and education ==
Shauna S. Roberts was born September 17, 1956, in Beavercreek, Ohio. In addition to Ohio, Roberts has lived in Pennsylvania, Illinois, Iowa, the District of Columbia and New Orleans. She now resides in Riverside, California. She received her B.A. in Anthropology from the University of Pennsylvania in 1977, and her Ph.D. in Anthropology from Northwestern University in 1984. She attended the Clarion Writers Workshop in 2009. She is a current member of the Orange County Science Fiction Club.

== Science and medical writing ==
Roberts was editor of the American Association for the Advancement of Science's Guide to Biotechnology Products And Instruments from 1986 to 1989, and wrote for The Journal of NIH Research, from 1989 to 1990.

Her nonfiction works outnumber her fiction credits, which are more recent. She wrote the American Diabetes Association's award-winning patient newsletter, The Diabetes Advisor, during its entire period of publication (1993–1999). She co-authored Basic Demographic Observations on Free-Ranging Rhesus Monkeys (with Donald Stone Sade, Diane Chepko-Sade, Jonathan M. Schneider, and Joan T. Richtsmeier) (1985) and The Commonsense Guide to Weight Loss for People with Diabetes (with Barbara Caleen Hansen) (1999). She has written numerous articles in such venues as Diabetes Forecast, Diabetes Care, Diabetes Self-Management, The Journal of NIH Research, Science, The FASEB Journal, Analytical Chemistry, Modern Drug Discovery, Veterans Health System Journal, Ocular Surgery News, Oncology News International, Caring Today, and The Bark.

== Fiction writing ==
Roberts's published short stories include:

- "Slipping Into Love", in the anthology Pleasure of the Heart and Other Stories (2002).
- "Insipid Love Songs", Fables (August 2003).
- "My Father's New Wife", Andromeda Spaceways Inflight Magazine (February/March 2004).
- "Hero Home", in the anthology Clash of Steel, Book One: Reluctant Hero. (2005).
- "The Hunt", Continuum Science Fiction (Fall 2006).
- "A Llama's Tale", Space Westerns (27 January 2008).
- "Elessa the Restless", in the anthology Barren Worlds (2008).
- "Coyote and the Gamblers", in the anthology Return to Luna (2008).
- "Ennui", Night to Dawn (April 2009).
- "The Hunt", Jim Baen's Universe (February 2010).

Her first novel, Like Mayflies in a Stream (a retelling of the Gilgamesh legend), was published by Hadley Rille Books in 2009. Roberts' novel The Moon God's Wife (2021) centres on Enheduanna, the ancient Sumerian poet.
