= Gilgamesh (Brucci opera) =

Opera by Rudolf Brucci

Gilgameš (Serbian Cyrillic: Гилгамеш) is an opera in three acts by Rudolf Brucci. The libretto by Arsenije Arsa Milošević is based on the Mesopotamian Epic of Gilgamesh. It premiered on November 2, 1986 at the Serbian National Theatre in Novi Sad.

== Roles ==
- Gilgamesh, a Sumerian king – baritone
- Enkidu, his friend and brother – tenor
- Priestess at the temple of Ishtar – soprano
- Rishat, Gilgamesh's mother – mezzo-soprano
- Ishtar, Sumerian goddess of love and fertility – mezzo-soprano
- Siduri Sabitu, guardian of entrance to the Garden of Gods – soprano
- Aruru, Sumerian goddess of creation – soprano
- Utnapishtim, Gilgamesh's ancestor – bass
- Utnapishtim's wife – mezzo-soprano
- Hunter / Ur-Shanabi / Utnapishtim's Sailor – tenor
- First priest – tenor
- Second priest – bass
- Anu, sky god / Ea, god of water and wisdom / Shamash, Sun god – bass
- Scorpion Man – male voice (speaking role)
- Scorpion Woman – female voice (speaking role)
- Humbaba, a demon – robot
- Snake – dancer
- People of Uruk, Soldiers, Guard, Priests, Priestesses, virgins in service of Ishtar, dancers

== See also ==
- Gilgamesh in the arts and popular culture
- Gilgamesh (disambiguation)#Operas

== Sources ==
- Basso, Alberto (1996). Musica in scena: storia dello spettacolo musicale, Volume 3, p. 457. UTET. ISBN 88-02-04939-4 (in Italian)
- Radović, Branka (2005). "Two orients in Rudolf Bruci's opera Gilgamesh". Muzikologija, Issue 5, pp. 153–165 (in Serbian with English summary)
- Ziolkowski, Eric (September 2007). "An ancient newcomer to modern culture". World Literature Today
