= Gilgamesh (Saygun opera) =

Opera composed by Ahmed Adnan Saygun

Gılgameş (Op. 65) is an opera in three acts and twelve scenes composed by Ahmed Adnan Saygun to a Turkish-language libretto by Münir Hayri Egeli. The opera, based on the Epic of Gilgamesh was composed from 1964 to 1983, but premiered in an early version in 1970. The work had its origins in an opera of the same name by Nevit Kodallı with a libretto by Orhan Asena which was premiered in Ankara in 1964, but Saygun and his librettist were commissioned to rewrite both music and libretto.

== See also ==
- Gilgamesh in the arts and popular culture
- Gilgamesh (disambiguation)#Operas
