= Arsenije Milošević =

Arsenije "Arsa" Milosevic (October 1931 – May 2006) was a Yugoslavian (Serbian) film director, television director, librettist and opera director.

Arsenije Arsa Milosevic was a Yugoslavian film, television, and theatre director. He was also a screenwriter and librettist. Milosevic's career started in the Belgrade Cine-Club. In 1957 he became the first Serbian director to be awarded a prize at the Cannes Film Festival, receiving third place in the experimental film category for his film Orpheus. Afterward, he worked at the Yugoslav State Television (Belgrade radio and television). After the death of his wife Olga, he turned to theatre and wrote the libretto for the opera Gilgamesh, for which Rudolph Brucci composed the music. The Gilgamesh premiere was in 1985 in the Serbian National Theatre in Novi Sad. Milosevic staged it like a new, contemporary opera, as multimedia with modern set design and choreography. The opera got high rates from critics and the audience. He also wrote a libretto Under the Mephistos Sign, for which the music was composed by a Serbian composer Srdjan Jacimovic. This libretto transposes Goethe's Faust, in the present day, with Dr. Faustus as a beautiful woman. However, this opera never had a premiere.
