= Van Gogh (opera) =

Kodallı opera by Nevit Kodallı

Van Gogh is an opera in one act and five scenes by Nevit Kodallı to a Turkish-language libretto by playwright Orhan Asena based on Irving Stone's Lust for Life about the painter Vincent van Gogh. The work was premiered at the Ankara State Opera as part of the first Ankara Music Festival that was planned by local arts organizations. The original production was directed by tenor Aydın Gün who also portrayed the title role. Other artists in the world premiere included soprano Sevda Aydan as Maya and bass Ayhan Baran as Paul Gauguin among others.
