= Gilgamesh (Kodallı opera) =

Gılgamış is a 1964 Turkish-language opera by Nevit Kodallı.

Simultaneously with Kodallı, Ahmed Adnan Saygun was also working around 1964 on a Gilgamesh project, which he completed as his Op.65 Gılgameş.

== See also ==
- Gilgamesh in the arts and popular culture
- Gilgamesh (disambiguation)#Operas
