= Bazi (king) =

Deified legendary king of Mari

Bazi 𒀭𒁀𒍣
- First appearance: Sumerian King List c. 2000 BC

In-universe information
- Occupation: King of Mari (reigned c. 30 years)

Bazi (𒀭𒁀𒍣, ^{d}Ba-zi) was a legendary king of Mari. He is mentioned in the recension of the Sumerian King List from Tell Leilan and in a version of the Ballad of Early Rulers known from Emar. The former of these two texts indicates he was deified. The god Bazi known only from the Old Babylonian Song of Bazi is presumed to be the same figure.

== Overview ==
According to the Tell Leilan recension of the Sumerian King List, Bazi was one of the kings of Mari. (Note: The section is either not fully preserved or omitted in other known copies.) He is the third of the Mariote kings listed, with Anba as his predecessor and Zizi as his successor, though a variant from Nippur apparently places Zizi before him. The list assigns a 30 years long reign to him and characterizes him as a leatherworker. Bazi is attested as an ordinary given name, presumably of Sumerian origin, and a number of individuals bearing it, including an inhabitant of Mari, have been identified in economic texts from between the Early Dynastic and Ur III periods. However, it is presumed king Bazi was most likely not a historical figure, and that his background is purely legendary. No known royal inscriptions can be attributed to him. There is also no indication that he necessarily originated in a western, Amorite tradition.

Bazi is also mentioned among famous ancient figures in a version of the Ballad of Early Rulers from Emar, alongside Alulim, Etana, Gilgamesh, Ziusudra, Humbaba, Enkidu and Zizi. However, he and Zizi are absent from the Old Babylonian version of this composition. The line mentioning both of them is also absent from the only of the three copies from Ugarit preserved to a sufficient degree to determine with certainty if the text matches the Emar version. Maurizio Viano estimates that it was added in the Middle Babylonian period for this reason. Yoram Cohen similarly suggests a “post-Old Babylonian or Middle Babylonian” date. Whether this passage was originally formulated in Mesopotamia or whether it was added by a local scribe in Emar remains a matter of dispute among researchers. In 1992, William W. Hallo proposed that Bazi and Zizi were included because they were regarded as local heroes in Emar, though due to awareness of the incoming publication of the Tell Leilan text also mentioning them, he suggested the tradition pertaining to them originated in Mari. Cohen, relying on the fact that Bazi is presumably not a historical figure and appears only in scholarly compositions of Mesopotamian origin, concluded that the line mentioning him must originate in Mesopotamia. He suggests that he was added due to his association with the western regions making him a suitable legendary figure to mention alongside Humbaba, also believed to reside there, and Gilgamesh and Enkidu, who according to myths traveled to this part of the world. He additionally cites the Sumerian King List as a likely influence on the Ballad of Early Rulers. Wilfred G. Lambert also voiced a degree of support for the eastern origin theory, noting that it is not necessary to presume the text was reworked in Emar or Ugarit.

The historical Babylonian dynasty of Bazi is unrelated to the legendary Bazi, and most likely was instead named after one of the cities named Baz(um) or Baṣ(um).

== Deification ==
In the Tell Leilan copy of the Sumerian King List, Bazi’s name is prefaced by the so-called "divine determinative", which indicates he was perceived as a deity. It was initially uncertain if the sign preceding his name should be read phonetically as an or as the determinative dingir, but the matter was resolved by a subsequent discovery of a text known as the Song of Bazi. This composition, dated to the Old Babylonian period, portrays him as a deity. Only a single copy has been identified so far, and its provenance remains unknown. The divine Bazi is otherwise unattested.

The plot of the myth revolves around Bazi's efforts to acquire a place of worship of his own, which he receives from Ea after proving his strength by overcoming his enemies. The latter god is addressed as his father. Bazi is described as "the god who surveys the human race, who knows the minds of the wicked and the just" and he is compared to a ram. He is also linked to exorcisms. The text describes a temple dedicated to him located in the area of Mounts Bašar and Šaršar, identified by Andrew R. George as a double name of the Jebel Bishri. The pairing of these two toponyms is attested in multiple literary texts, and they were elsewhere associated with Amorites and Suteans. Suggestions that one of the mountains can be identified with Tell Bazi have been criticized by Alfonso Archi, who points out that this site is only a small hill and it is implausible that it would be treated as a mountain comparable to Jebel Bishri.

Annette Zgoll has suggested that based on the fact that the Song of Bazi is written in Akkadian, rather than Sumerian, and on the inclusion of instructions for performance, it can be assumed that it was originally sung during festivals.

== Proposed associations with other figures ==
Eckhart Frahm has proposed that the name of Bazi, specifically in sequence with Zizi (^{d}ba-zi-zi-zi), was the origin of the theonym Pazuzu. He points out that in the Song of Bazi, the eponymous figure is linked to magic and exorcisms, similarly to Pazuzu in later sources. However, he acknowledges that the evidence is not conclusive. Different proposals instead present Pazuzu’s development as influenced by the image of figures such as Humbaba or the Egyptian god Bes.

Alfonso Archi suggests that the Song of Bazi, specifically what he interprets as the characterization of the eponymous figure as omniscient and his association with Ea, “finds an echo in the Hurrian poem of Ea and the Beast.”

== Notes ==
Bazi
Regnal titles
Preceded by Anba	King of Mari legendary	Succeeded by Zizi
