= Orange County Science Fiction Club =

Science fiction organization

- OCSFC Logo
- Abbreviation: OCSFC
- Formation: 1982
- Type: NGO
- Location: Orange County, California
- Website: http://www.OCSFC.org/

The Orange County Science Fiction Club (OCSFC), founded in 1982, is a public club which meets in Orange County, California, and is one of the oldest continuing science fiction and fantasy organizations in Orange County. Membership is open to anyone in the community and includes published authors and actors. The club has also helped organize book signing events of well-known authors and has assisted in organizing local science fiction conventions.

== Meetings ==
Meeting topics include general news and information by members about science or science fiction/fantasy conventions, lectures, films and other genre related event. Generally a guest speaker associated with science or science fiction, including prominent authors, artist, actors and professionals from many fields will give a talk or presentation. However, being a social interest organization, guest speakers need not be limited to Science or Science Fiction. The meetings end with a question and answer session with the guest speaker, book signings, and one on one discussions with the guest.

Past guest speakers include Gregory Benford (astrophysicist and prolific author whose works include the Nebula Award winning Timescape), James Blaylock (Philip K. Dick Award winner, author of Homunculus and The Last Coin), Octavia E. Butler (Hugo Award and Nebula Award winner, author of Parable of the Sower}, Don Dixon (space and astronomical artist), Richard Hatch (Actor primarily known for his role as Apollo in Battlestar Galactica (original 1978-1979 TV series)), George Clayton Johnson (co-author of Logan's Run and writer of several episodes of The Twilight Zone (original 1959-1964 TV series)), Dean Koontz (bestselling author), Tim Powers (Philip K. Dick Award winner, Nebula Award nominee, author of The Anubis Gates and Declare), Shauna S. Roberts (author of Like Mayflies in the Stream and OCSFC member), Harry Turtledove (historian and author of the Hugo Award-winning The Guns of the South as well as other alternate history works),

== History ==
Established in 1982 by science fiction and fantasy book collectors Greg Funke and Graham Volker, the OCSFC had its first meeting in January 1983, and has been holding regular meetings continuously since. Originally a club for book collectors, it soon expanded its membership to include anyone interested in science fiction, fantasy, or science in general. As it grew, the club found itself with members who had connections to authors, actors and other professionals in the fields of science, art, and entertainment. Soon, the regular monthly meetings began to feature prominent guest speakers giving talks, lectures, or programs with audio/visual presentation. Over time, the club became increasingly active in arranging field trips, participation in conventions, and the organizing of book signing events.

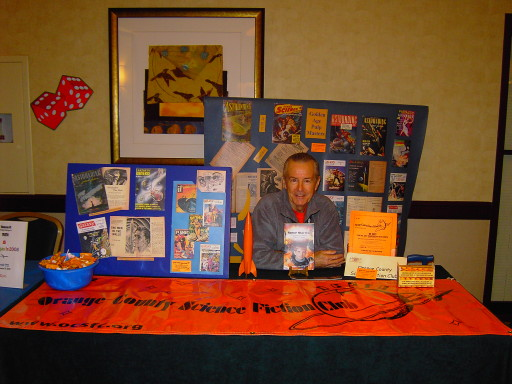
Greg Funke, OCSFC Co-founder, at Loscon 2006

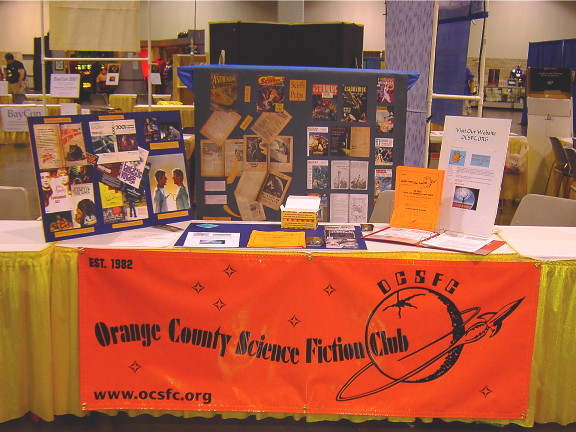
OCSFC information table at 2006 Worldcon

== Activities ==
For several years, OCSFC has had a visible presence at the annual Los Angeles Science Fantasy Society (LASFS) convention, LosCon, in Los Angeles, California. Members often participate as panel members of group discussions during the convention. OCSFC members—in conjunction with local book stores—have organized book signings for prominent authors, including Dean Koontz, Steven Barnes, and Sherwood Smith. In 2006, OCSFC participated in and assisted with the 64th World Science Fiction Convention (aka Worldcon) held in Anaheim, California.

Over the years the club has expanded its activities to include a reading and a writers group:

- The Reading Orbit meets immediately after the meeting to discuss a different, genre related book or story each month. The chosen work may be a classic SF or Fantasy tale, a contemporary novel or a series of theme related short stories.
- The Writers Orbit meets separately. Members of the Writing Orbit discuss each other's work, contribute hints and advice which has led to the publication of many of the stories. Some members of the Writers Orbit have attended the preeminent Clarion Workshop and Clarion West Writers Workshop.

OCSFC members stay connected via an Internet E-mail group, where a broad range of lively topics and events are discussed. The web address can be found on their official website.

Many members regularly meet to attend films or lectures.
