= Journal of NIH Research =

Monthly American magazine

The Journal of NIH Research was a monthly American magazine aimed at biomedical researchers, published from 1989 to 1997. Despite its name, it was not affiliated with the National Institutes of Health (NIH). It was based in Washington DC.

== History ==
The Journal of NIH Research was established in 1989 by William Miller and Tod Herbers, both former employees of the American Association for the Advancement of Science. Miller and Herbers received funding to start the publication from a group of venture capitalists, including Martin Peretz, the then-chair of The New Republic. They hired Deborah Barnes, who had been working for Science's news section, to be the magazine's first editor. When the magazine was first launched, 35,000 copies of it were sent to NIH-funded researchers for free, and Miller and Herbers planned to make all the revenue they needed from advertising.

After they failed to generate enough revenue to keep producing the magazine, Miller and Herbers sold it to Medical Economics Company, based in Montvale, New Jersey, in 1994. Medical Economics soon tried to cut the magazine's costs by telling Barnes to reduce the size of the magazine's six-person staff. Rather than comply, Barnes resigned from her position as editor in February 1996. Medical Economics decided that it would permanently stop publishing the magazine in 1997, after failing to either generate enough revenue to keep publishing it or to find another company willing to buy it. The final issue was published in December 1997.
