= Gilgamesh: A New English Version =

Cover for the Gilgamesh: A New English Version

Gilgamesh: A New English Version is a book about Gilgamesh by Stephen Mitchell. It was published in New York by The Free Press in 2004, ISBN 978-0-7432-6164-7, and is held in over 2700 WorldCat libraries. It was reviewed by Jasper Grifrin in The New York Review of Books 53, no. 4, (2006): 25, by The Gay & Lesbian Review Worldwide; 12, no. 2, (2005): 38–39, and the Hudson Review, Summer, 2005, vol. 58, no. 2, p. 329-334.
