= Ludmila Zeman =

Czech-Canadian artist, animator and creator of children's books

- Born: Ludmila Zemanová; 23 April 1947 (age 78); Zlín, Czechoslovakia
- Education: Střední uměleckoprůmyslová škola, Uherské Hradiště
- Occupations: Artist, animator
- Known for: Children's books and animated films
- Spouse: Eugen Spálený
- Children: Linda Zeman-Spaleny; Malvina Spaleny
- Parent: Karel Zeman
- Awards: 1995 Governor General's Award for Children's Illustration
- Website: ludmilazeman.com

Ludmila Zeman (born 23 April 1947) is a Czech-Canadian artist, animator and creator of children's books. She is the daughter of filmmaker Karel Zeman.

== Life and career ==
Zeman was born in the city of Zlín, Czechoslovakia (renamed Gottwaldov in 1949–1989). She graduated from the college of art (Střední uměleckoprůmyslová škola) in Uherské Hradiště. She worked as her father's assistant for his final films, and married Eugen Spálený, the chief animator at his studio. They had two children, Linda and Malvinia. She launched a career in story books and animation for children.

In 1983, Zeman and her husband were invited to teach film technique at Emily Carr University of Art and Design in Vancouver. When the couple attempted to emigrate, the Czechoslovak communist government refused them permission, accusing them of pro-Western leanings. Zeman was told to leave the animation studio, and Spálený was drafted into menial construction work. In the summer of 1984, the family escaped through Yugoslavia to a refugee camp in Austria, finally arriving in Canada to accept the teaching posts.

The Cedar Tree of Life, a thirty-second animated segment the couple produced for the Canadian edition of Sesame Street, attracted the attention of the National Film Board of Canada, which invited the couple to make a short film on a topic of their choice. Zeman's production was Lord of the Sky, based on myths of the Canadian north Pacific First Nations and produced using paper cutouts. The film was a success, winning eleven international awards, including a blue ribbon at the American Film Festival in 1993; it was shown at the Sundance Film Festival the following year and was shortlisted for an Academy Award nomination.

Following Lord of the Sky, Zeman and Spálený planned a feature-length animated film based on the Epic of Gilgamesh. Karel Zeman had introduced the epic, which was among his favorite books, to Ludmila when she was eleven. The concept was eventually developed into a trilogy of children's books written and illustrated by Zeman: Gilgamesh the King (1991), The Revenge of Ishtar (1993), and The Last Quest of Gilgamesh (1995). The final book in the trilogy won the 1995 Governor General's Award for Children's Illustration. The Embassy of Canada in Japan presented an exhibition of Ludmila Zeman's work in Tokyo in 2011.
