= Rudolf Brucci =

Croatian composer

Rudolf Brucci (Bruči) (March 30, 1917 – October 30, 2002), was a composer of Croatian and Italian origin, born in Zagreb. He was married to Yugoslavian opera singer, Olga Brucci.

He began his artistic life playing viola in various orchestras, ranging from the cabaret to the symphonic. After moving to Belgrade, at the age of 30 he began his music studies as the only student of the composer Petar Bingulac, who was a student of the French composer Vincent d'Indy. In 1953, he took composition lessons with the Viennese composer Alfred Uhl at the Vienna Music Academy.

A crucial moment in his work was winning first prize at the Queen Elisabeth Music Competition for composers in Brussels in 1965 with his symphony Lesta. This prize was won in competition with 250 other composers from 26 countries.

In the 1970s, Brucci improved the Academy of Arts in Novi Sad, where he was the first dean, an academy with best music department in ex-Yugoslavia. He was one of the most important composers of Novi Sad, he urged the building of the new opera house there, the Serbian National Theatre. He was one of the founders of Vojvodina Academy of Arts and Sciences, Philharmonic and Music High School.

In the centre of his compositional work was the symphony orchestra. He wrote four symphonies, Symphony No. 1 (1951), Sinfonia lesta (1965), and two Third Symphonies, from 1969 and 1974. Other orchestral works include the symphonic poem Maskal, Metamorfosis B–A–C–H for strings, the ballets Katarina Izmailova, Golden Demon, and Circa, the cantata Vojvodina (text by Miroslav Antić), and two operas, Prometheus and Gilgamesh.

Brucci's style is basically conventional, but he attempted to incorporate new ideas, such as bitonality, polytonality, and atonality. On occasion he employed serial techniques, but never completely or strictly. His use of such devices was always thoughtful, and often propelled by a strong rhythmic energy and brilliant orchestration.

He died in Novi Sad on October 30, 2002, at the age of 85.
