= Gilgamesh (restaurant) =

Restaurant in London, United Kingdom

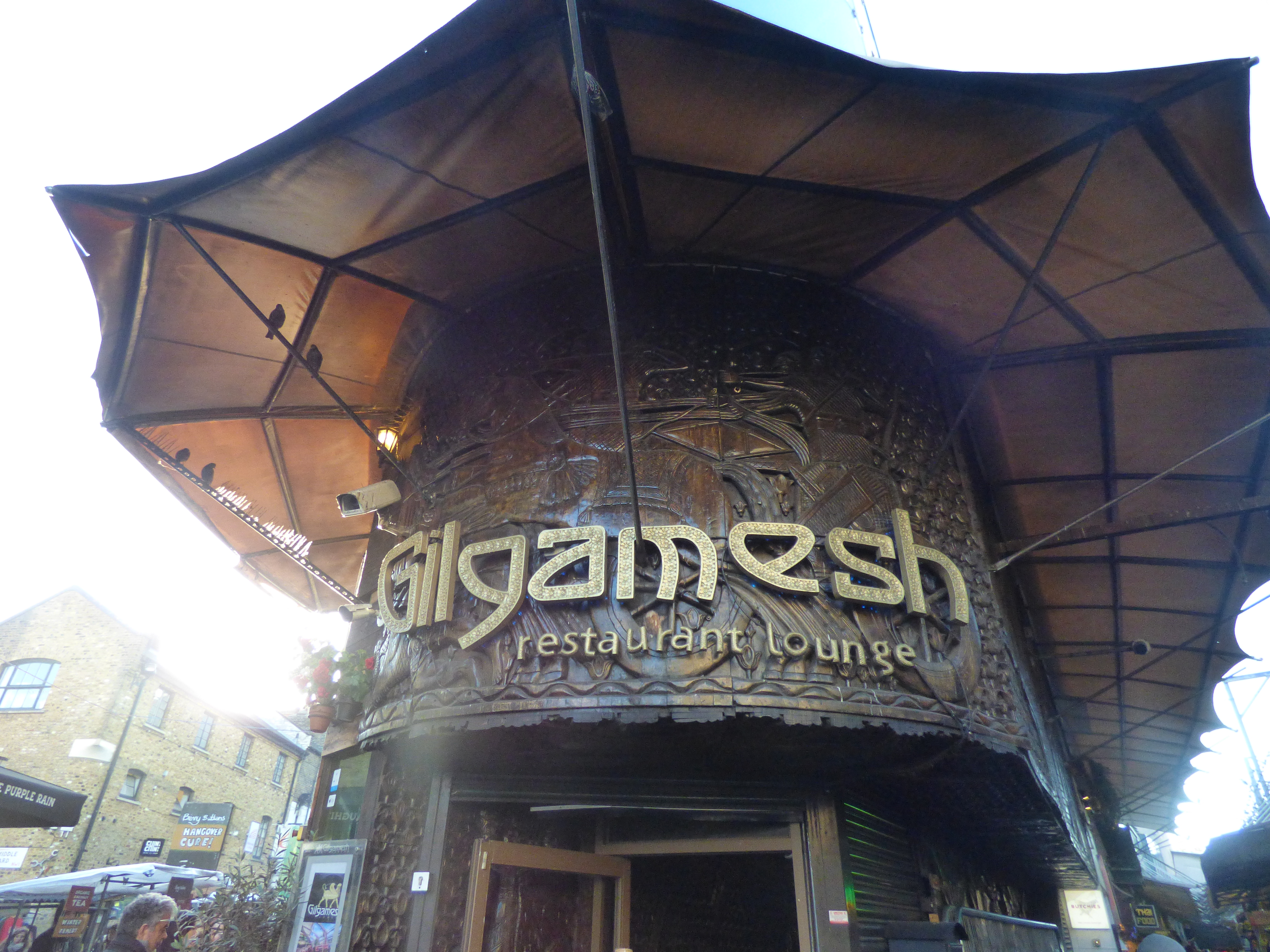
- Gilgamesh at its previous location in Camden Town
- Interactive map of Gilgamesh

Restaurant information
- Established: June 2006
- Head chef: Dean Light
- Food type: Asian cuisine
- Location: 4A Upper St Martin's Lane, Westminster, London, United Kingdom
- Website: GilgameshBar.com

Gilgamesh Restaurant Bar & Lounge is a restaurant and bar in Upper St Martin's Lane, Westminster, London. It was previously sited in the Stables Market in Camden Town from 2006 to 2018. Despite its Mesopotamian name and theme, the restaurant typically serves South East Asian, Chinese and Japanese-inspired eclectic cuisine.

Opened in June 2006 by a consortium of Israeli businessmen, the restaurant was inspired by the Sumerian king Gilgamesh. Furnished with dark wood and heavy furnishings, its owners claimed its reliefs and carvings were the work of over 10,000 workers from Northern India. It contains a range of exotic imagery, and is intended to evoke the mystique of the Babylonian era. Its Camden interior was said to be an "ostentatious replica of a Babylonian palace". The tables and chairs were intended to be reminiscent of those of the palaces of Ancient Babylon. The London Restaurant Guide described its bar as being like a theme park, and says, "This is one of those restaurants that sets great store by glitz and it certainly seems to strike a chord with a clientele that isn't too "bovvered" about the food, preferring cocktails, champagne and celebrity."

The restaurant was taken over by businessman and restaurateur Richard Caring in 2008, and closed in January 2018.

It reopened on in smaller premises on Upper St Martin's Lane in the West End in December 2023.
