= Humbaba =

Character in Gilgamesh myths

- Guardian of the cedar forest
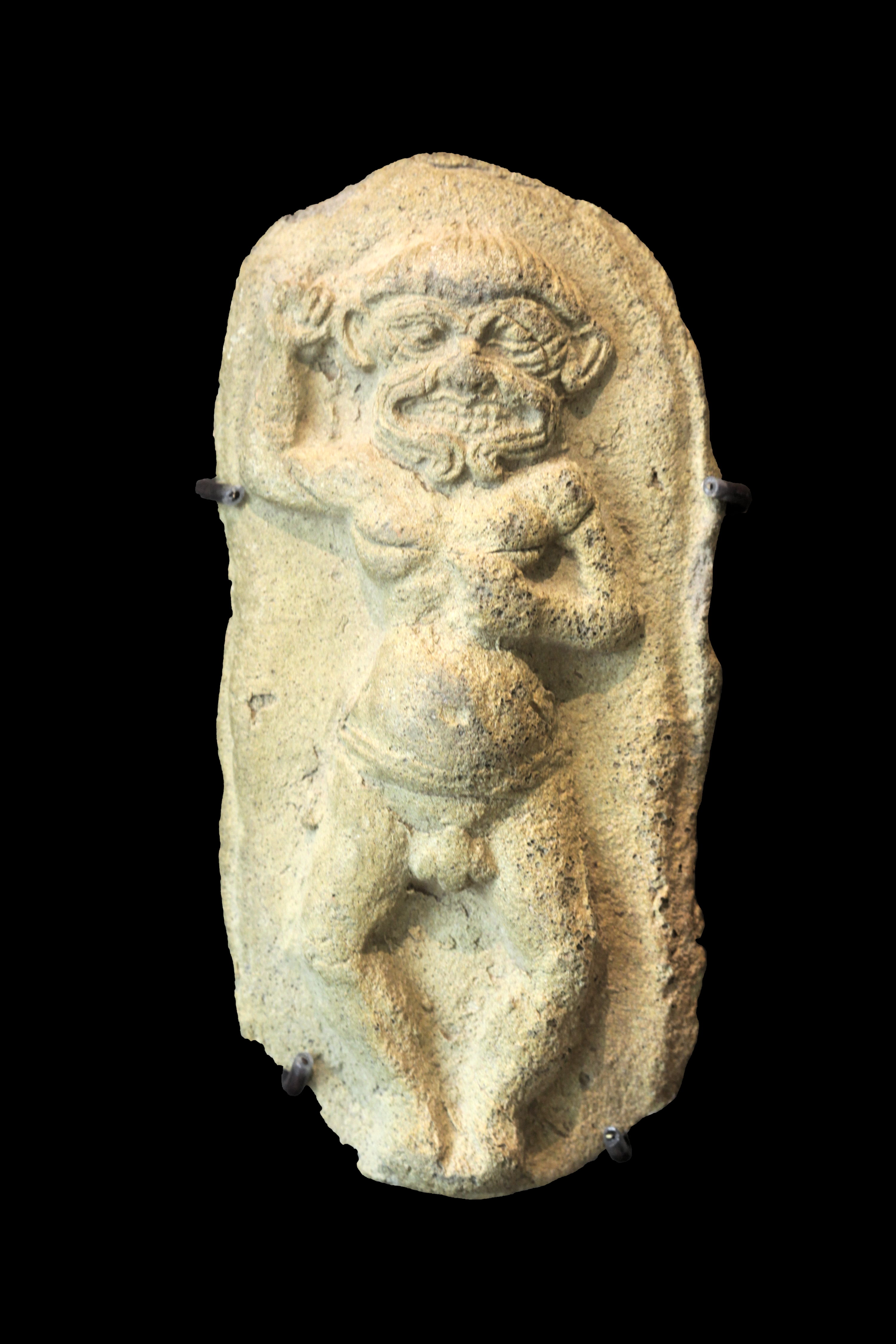
- Old Babylonian terracotta plaque depicting Humbaba from the Louvre

Humbaba (Ḫumbaba; 𒄷𒌝𒁀𒁀, Ḫumbāba, with an optional determinative 𒀭), originally known as Ḫuwawa in Sumerian (𒄷𒉿𒉿, Ḫuwāwa), was a figure in Mesopotamian mythology. The origin and meaning of his name are unknown. He was portrayed as an anthropomorphic figure comparable to an ogre or giant. He is best known from Sumerian and Akkadian narratives focused on the hero Gilgamesh, including short compositions belonging to the curriculum of scribal schools, various versions of the Epic of Gilgamesh, and several Hurrian and Hittite adaptations. He is invariably portrayed as the inhabitant or guardian of the cedar forest, to which Gilgamesh ventures with his companion Enkidu. The subsequent encounter leads to the death of Humbaba, which provokes the anger of the gods. Humbaba is also attested in other works of Mesopotamian literature. Multiple depictions of him have also been identified, including combat scenes and apotropaic clay heads.

It has been suggested that the iconography of Humbaba influenced depictions of the gorgons in Greece, in particular scenes of Perseus slaying Medusa with the help of Athena. A late derivative of Humbaba also seems to be found in both Jewish and Manichaean versions of the Book of Giants, where one of the eponymous beings is referred to as Ḥôbabiš, Ḥôbabis or Ḥōbāīš. While it is agreed the name is derived from his own, the context in which it appears shows no similarity to known myths involving him. Traces of Ḥôbabiš have also been identified in a number of later works belonging to Islamic tradition, such as religious polemics. A number of connections have also been proposed between Humbaba and figures such as Kombabos from the works of Lucian or biblical Hobab, but they are not regarded as plausible.

== Name ==
The name Humbaba (Ḫumbaba) first occurs as an ordinary personal name in documents from the Ur III period. The modern spelling reflects the Neo-Assyrian and Neo-Babylonian copies of the Epic of Gilgamesh, where it is consistently written in cuneiform as Ḫum-ba-ba, but this variant is not attested before the first millennium BCE. The oldest attested form is conventionally rendered as Ḫuwawa, though multiple cuneiform spellings are attested: Ḫu-wa-wa, Ḫu-ba-ba and Ḫu-Ú-Ú, the last of which has two possible readings due to the sign Ú standing for both ba_{6} and wa_{x}. In texts from Mari and Tell Harmal, in which the scribal conventions reflect the closely related traditions of the Middle Euphrates and the Eshnunna-influenced Diyala area, the name is instead spelled as Ḫu-bi-bi, which seemingly reflects the pronunciation /Ḫuppipi/. On lexical grounds it is presumed that similar reading of the name, even when it was written as Ḫu-wa-wa, might have also been the norm elsewhere in Syria, for example in Alalakh, as well as in Hittite and Hurrian sources, which might indicate Ḫuppipi was the default form in both north and west of the Mesopotamian cultural sphere of influence. Unique forms showing inflection are attested in copies from Ugarit (nominative Ḫu-ba-bu, genitive Ḫu-ba-bi) and from Assyria from the Middle Assyrian period (accusative Ḫu-ba-ba and genitive Ḫu-be-be). Additionally abbreviated forms, Ḫuwa and Ḫu, are known from an Old Babylonian version of the Epic of Gilgamesh presently belonging to the Schøyen Collection.

Many of the variants of Humbaba's name are attested both with and without the so-called "divine determinative" (dingir). Examples of its use have been identified in texts from Kish, Ur, Nerebtum, Susa and possibly Larsa and Shaduppum. A fragment of a Hurrian literary text using it is also known. However, no sources indicate that Humbaba was necessarily regarded as a god. In modern literature, he is variously described as an "ogre", "demon" or "giant". In a passage from one of the Old Babylonian copies of the Epic of Gilgamesh, he is described as ḫarḫaru, based on context presumably "ogre", "monster" or "freak". He is generally portrayed as anthropomorphic.

Humbaba’s name shows no obvious signs of specific linguistic affiliation and its meaning is unknown. Similarly structured names are sometimes referred to as “banana names” in Assyriology. It is sometimes assumed that they belong to a linguistic substrate, but this view is not universally accepted, and it is not certain if all of them come from the same language. Frans Wiggermann instead suggests that Humbaba’s name might have originally been an onomatopoeia: he argues he was in origin an apotropaic grinning face hung on doors to ward off evil, with his name being a representation of the sounds he was believed to make. He assumes the myths involving him served as an etiology meant to explain this custom.

The phonetically similar names of a stone, ^{na_{5}}ḫúb-be-be, and a lizard, ḫuwawītum, were both derived from Humbaba's own.

=== Disproved proposals ===
While such a possibility has been suggested in older scholarship, the name Ḫumḫum does not refer to Humbaba, but to an unrelated minor god worshiped in Dūr-Šarrukku, as attested in a text from the reign of Esarhaddon mentioning the return of his statue.

It has also been argued that Humbaba was derived from the Elamite god Humban, but according to Andrew R. George this proposal is not plausible in the light of available evidence, and the most recent attempt at justifying this connection, undertaken by John Hansman in the 1970s, rests on "unsafe historical conclusions".

== Humbaba and Gilgamesh ==
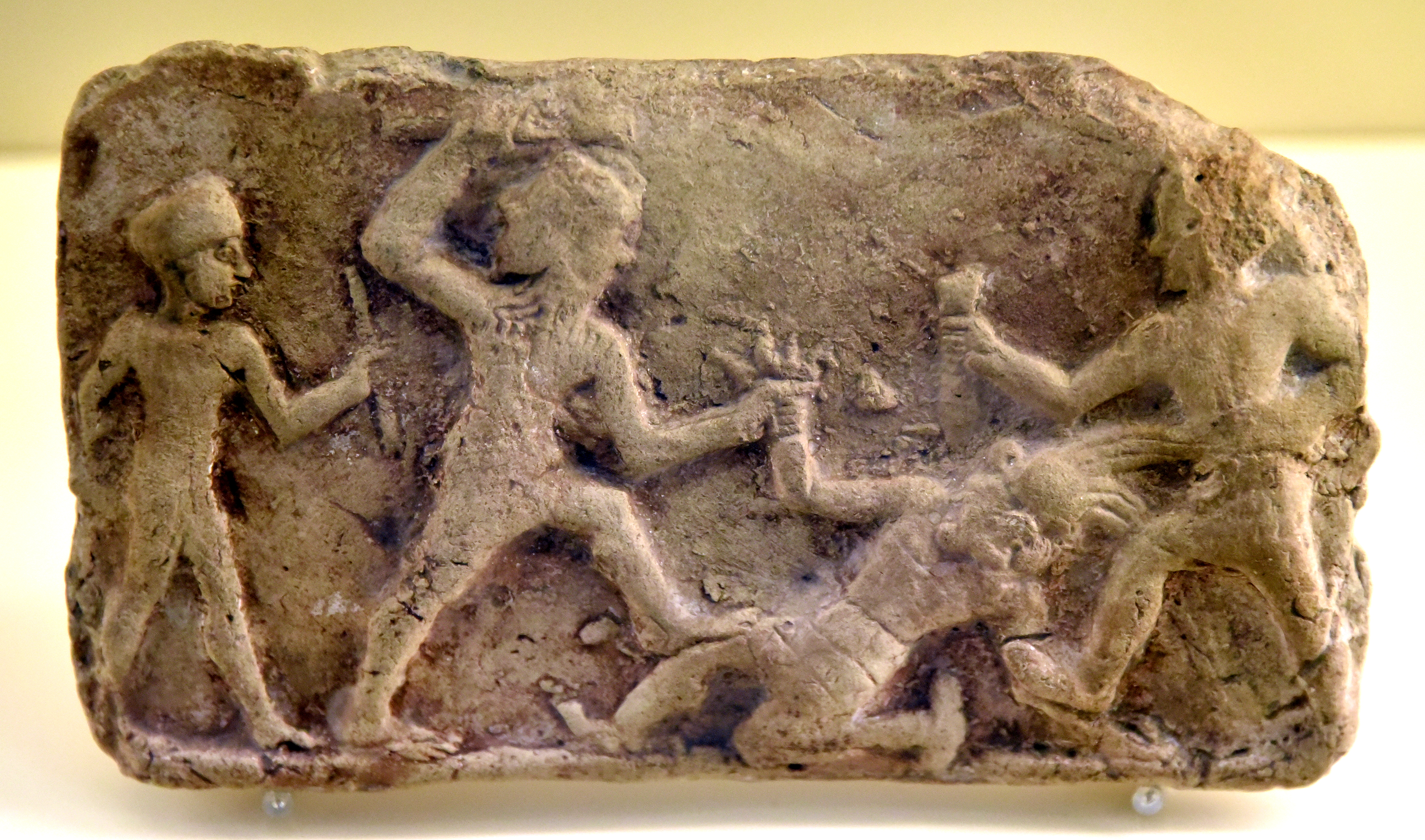
Gilgamesh and Enkidu slaying Humbaba at the Cedar Forest (from Iraq, 19th–17th century BCE, Vorderasiatisches Museum Berlin)

Humbaba appears in multiple works of Mesopotamian literature focused on the hero Gilgamesh, in which he invariably acts as his adversary during a quest to obtain cedar wood from a distant forest.

=== Gilgamesh and Huwawa A and B ===
The oldest composition describing the confrontation between Gilgamesh and Humbaba has two versions, the Sumerian Gilgamesh and Huwawa A and Gilgamesh and Huwawa B (Gilgamesh was previously read as Bilgames A and Bilgames and Ḫuwawa B). Copies of version A are more common. Of all known Gilgamesh texts it was seemingly the most often copied one, with between 85 and 92 examples identified by 2010. Their broad distribution reflects the use of the text in scribal training. It belonged to the so-called "decad", a set of texts which formed the basis of scribal education in the early second millennium BCE.

In the early poems, Humbaba is described as an intimidating "mountain man" of unknown origin, but there is no indication that his appearance was distinct from that of a human, and he is chiefly set apart from mortals by his supernatural powers. The source of his invulnerability are his seven “auras” or “terrors”, Sumerian ni_{2} or me_{2}-lam. While a singular aura was a common attribute of deities, seven auras are for the most part exclusively attested in connection to Humbaba, though an exception, the tablet CBS 7972 (STVC 40) + N 3718, a fragment of a hymn dedicated to Nergal, has been identified and subsequently published by Jeremiah Peterson in 2008.

The location of the forest where Humbaba lives is not precisely defined outside of a reference to “seven ranges” which need to be crossed to reach it, but it is commonly assumed that the heroes’ destination was the Iranian highlands. Similar formulaic phrases are used to refer to this area in myths about Lugalbanda and Enmerkar known to partially take place in this area. It has been proposed that making an eastern location the target of the expedition was meant to symbolically reflect the geopolitics of the Ur III period. However, a western location, specifically Lebanon, is also sometimes proposed.

In version A, Gilgamesh encounters Humbaba after realizing the impermanence of life prompts him to embark on a quest to bring cedar wood to his city to acquire lasting fame. When Humbaba notices Gilgamesh and his companion Enkidu cut down one of the trees, he uses one of his auras to stun them. After awakening Gilgamesh vows that he will not go back before he finds out whether the attacker is human or divine. Enkidu doubts if they can defeat him, but he is eventually convinced by Gilgamesh’s bravado. Due to the powers the auras grant to Humbaba, he cannot be defeated through conventional means, and Enkidu suggests tricking him into willfully casting them off. Gilgamesh accomplishes that by offering him various bribes, including goods not available in the remote forest such as fine flour, water in leather containers, small and big sandals, gemstones and other similar gifts, as well as a promise that he will be able to marry his sisters:

(I swear) by the life of my mother Ninsumuna and of my father, holy Lugalbanda:
Because no one knows your mountain dwelling, to make your mountain dwelling famous,
I will bring you Enmebaragesi, (Note: It is possible the use of this name is a joke at Humbaba’s expense, revolving around Gilgamesh exploiting his unawareness that Enmebaragesi is the name of the father of his enemy, Aga of Kish, rather than his sister.) my elder sister, to be your wife in the mountains."
Once again (Gilgamesh) spoke to him:
(I swear) by the life of my mother Ninsumuna and of my father, holy Lugalbanda:
Because no one knows your mountain dwelling, to make your mountain dwelling famous,
I will bring you Peshtur, my little sister, (Note: Also read Matur. She is also attested as Gilgamesh’s sister in Gilgamesh and the Bull of Heaven.) to be your concubine in the mountains;
So hand me your protective sheens; I want to become a member of your family!

The scene is presumed to be humorous, and seems to portray Humbaba as lonely and gullible. Piotr Michalowski additionally notes the quoted passage might be a satire targeting the well attested custom of marrying the daughters from the royal line to rulers of neighboring kingdoms in the Ur III period. Similar interpretation has also been proposed by Andrew R. George. The episode is absent from the later editions of the narrative. Humbaba accepts Gilgamesh’s proposal, and offers him his auras, which are described as cedar-like and possible to cut into logs for transport. According to George, their form might be an indication that while seemingly anthropomorphic, Humbaba was himself envisioned as partially tree-like. As soon as he gives up on the last of the auras and loses his invulnerability, Gilgamesh strikes him. After being punched in the face, he pleads to be let go. He first addresses Utu, lamenting that he never knew his parents and was instead raised by the sun god himself and by the mountains, (Note: No known texts discuss Humbaba’s parentage. Dina Katz proposes that he might have been an orphan, and in the light of his declaration Utu acted as his foster father.) and then Gilgamesh, who at first takes pity on him. He asks Enkidu if he agrees to let Humbaba go, but he rejects this proposal. Humbaba turns towards him, and complains that he has no place to advise on such matters because he is only a servant:

O Enkidu, you use wicked words to him about me, a hired man is hired for rations, behind another such man he follows. Why use wicked words to him?

In response, Enkidu cuts his throat. This constitutes a reversal, as through the earlier sections of the story he was meant to act as a voice of reason, advising Gilgamesh to act cautiously. He then cuts off his head and places it in a leather bag. The protagonists take their trophy to the god Enlil, angering him, possibly because he finds the abuse of Humbaba’s trust unacceptable. He states that Gilgamesh should have treated him with respect, and that they both deserved to be similarly honored. However, neither Gilgamesh or Enkidu are punished for their actions in the end. Enlil subsequently redistributes Humbaba’s auras:

He gave Ḫuwawa’s first aura to the fields.
He gave his second aura to the rivers.
He gave his third aura to the reed-beds.
He gave his fourth aura to the lions.
He gave his fifth aura to the palace.
He gave his sixth aura to the forests.
He gave his seventh aura to Nungal.

One of the copies might mention Humbaba in the closing formulaic doxology alongside Gilgamesh and Enkidu, which would indicate a degree of veneration, though the restoration of the name is uncertain and it has been proposed that the goddess Nisaba was meant instead.

The plot of version B is largely analogous. It is substantially shorter than version A, and it is often proposed that it is more archaic, though the available copies of both are contemporaneous with each other. A difference between the plots of the two versions occurs after the heroes wake up after being stunned by Humbaba’s aura: in version B Gilgamesh doubts his ability, and invokes the god Enki to help him, which the latter does by apparently providing the instructions for tricking Humbaba through Enkidu, enabling the rest of the events to unfold similarly. However, only the footwear is mentioned among the offered gifts. The ending of version B is not preserved, but it is sometimes argued that Humbaba was spared in it.

The defeat of Humbaba is also mentioned as one of the great deeds of Gilgamesh in Bilgames’ Death, another of the early standalone Gilgamesh narratives.

=== Epic of Gilgamesh ===
A number of the early compositions about Gilgamesh were eventually adapted into the form of a singular epic, possibly either during the reign of Rim-Sîn I of Larsa or Hammurabi and Samsu-iluna of Babylon. The Humbaba narrative was among them, though the version known from the Epic of Gilgamesh is not a direct translation of the Sumerian texts, but rather an original composition influenced by them. As an explanation the existence of an independent Akkadian account of the battle between Humbaba and the heroes, later incorporated into the Epic, has been proposed by Daniel E. Fleming and Sara J. Milstein.

==== Old Babylonian version ====
The incorporation of Humbaba into the Epic of Gilgamesh is already attested in the Old Babylonian period. Multiple known copies preserve the section focused on Gilgamesh’s journey to the cedar forest and on the encounter with its inhabitant. In contrast with the older Humbaba narratives, where he lives in the east, in the Old Babylonian version of the Epic he becomes a denizen of the west. Individual copies make references to the cedar forest being located in northern Syria or in its proximity, with direct references to Sirion and Lebanon, or alternatively Ebla and lands inhabited by Amorites. The change presumably reflected a different geopolitical situation, with closer links developing between Mesopotamia and western peoples and states in the Middle Euphrates and Khabur areas. Another possibility is that the change was influenced by the traditions focused on legendary deeds of the kings of the Akkadian Empire, as Naram-Sin was famed for seeking cedars in the Amanus Mountains in the west. According to Andrew R. George the mention of Ebla in particular supports the latter assumption, as this toponym also appears in literary texts about Naram-Sin and his predecessor Sargon.

Humbaba is first mentioned when Gilgamesh proposes an expedition to his forest to brighten the mood of Enkidu. In contrast with older narratives, he is apparently well known to the inhabitants of Uruk, rather than an unexpected encountered in the forest without prior notice. He is described as a fearsome figure with a strange face by the elders of Uruk, while Enkidu states that “everything is altered” about his appearance. However, there is no indication that he was necessarily larger than a human, and his power similarly as in earlier texts derives from his auras, here designated by the Akkadian words melammū. In contrast with the Sumerian narratives, they do not render him invulnerable, but the Akkadian version provides him with a new power instead: his voice has supernatural properties, with the copy of the epic presently in the Yale Babylonian Collection stating that "his voice is the Deluge, his mouth is fire, his breath is death" and a fragment from Tell Ishchali attributing the formation of Sirion and Lebanon to his roar. Another new addition is a reference to the possibility of defeating him with the help of divine forces of Shamash and Lugalbanda. He is also explicitly identified as a guardian of the forest, and his presence requires specific precautions. Enkidu also already encountered him in the past, and tells Gilgamesh that he familiarized himself with him while still roaming the wilderness. He highlights that he is a dangerous adversary, and additionally states that the cedar forest where he resides is also guarded by the god Wer: (Note: Wer was a weather god worshiped chiefly in the Middle Euphrates and Diyala areas, in the north of Babylonia, and in Assyria. His presence in this passage presumably is supposed to highlight the western setting of the scene.)

How can we go, my friend, to the Forest of Cedar?
The one who guards it is Wēr, he is mighty, never sleeping.
Ḫuwawa was appointed by Wēr,
Adad is the first, he the second!
In order to safeguard the cedar,
Enlil assigned him the Seven Terrors.

Andrew R. George assumes that Wer was nominally the ruler of the forest, and appointed Humbaba as his second in command, with Enlil only being responsible for confirming this decision. Daniel Fleming and Sara J. Milstein instead argue that Wer should be interpreted as a figure directly identified with Humbaba in this context instead.

The elders of Uruk also warn Gilgamesh about Humbaba, but he rejects the pleas and embarks on the journey to the cedar forest alongside Enkidu. The surviving copy of this section on the Yale tablet breaks off before the confrontation with Humbaba occurs. However, further details are provided by other, shorter fragments, which indicate that during the journey Gilgamesh had a number of dreams foretelling his confrontation with Humbaba, in which the guardian of the cedar forest appears in various symbolic non-anthropomorphic guises meant to highlight his power: as an avalanche, a thunderstorm, an Anzû bird and a wild bull. The dreams differ slightly between known copies. They might either originate in an earlier textual source which has yet to be discovered or oral tradition, or constitute an invention of the compilers of the epic. While no known sources describe the battle between Humbaba and Gilgamesh, a fragment from Tell Harmal seemingly does detail his submission, and might indicate that in this version he knew about his incoming defeat due to a dream vision sent by Shamash. A reference to his death occurs on a tablet from Tell Ishchali, and possibly on an unprovenanced one presently held in Baghdad, though the accounts differ and the latter might instead describe the fate of an unidentified figure belonging to his household. The former indicates that his demise was accompanied by an earthquake.

==== Standard Babylonian version ====
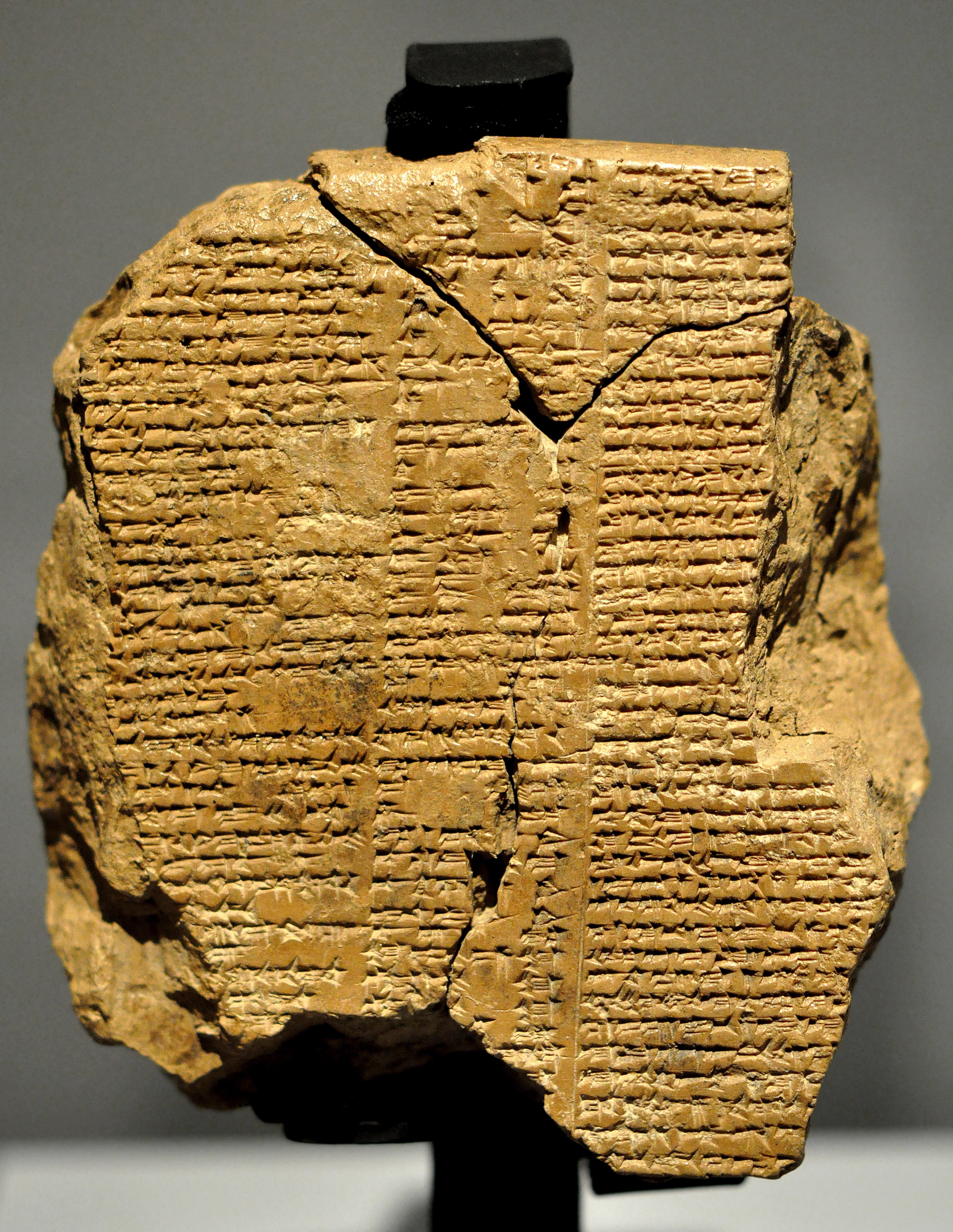
The Sulaymaniyah Museum copy of tablet V of the Epic of Gilgamesh, describing the encounter with Humbaba.

After the Old Babylonian period a new version of the epic referred to as “Standard Babylonian” or as the “Twelve Tablet Edition” emerged. Neo-Assyrian sources attribute this version of the Epic to the scribe Sin-leqa-unninni, who likely lived in the Kassite period. More precise dating is difficult due to small number of known fragments dated to the times between the Old Babylonian epic and the new canonical edition, though it can be assumed that it cannot be more recent than 1150 BCE due to the absence of references to either Marduk or Assur, the main Mesopotamian gods in the first millennium BCE. The Humbaba narrative occupies the fifth tablet, with copies recovered from Nineveh (Neo-Assyrian) and Uruk (Late Babylonian). Furthermore, in 2011 the Sulaymaniyah Museum acquired another example, dated to the Neo-Babylonian period and identified as a fragment of Epic of Gilgamesh by Farouk Al-Rawi, who subsequently prepared a translation alongside Andrew R. George, with additional help from Kamal Rashid Rahim, the director of antiquities in Sulaymaniyah, Hashim Hama Abdullah, the director of the Sulaymaniyah Museum, and other staff members of the latter institution.

In the Standard Babylonian edition, Humbaba is first mentioned when Gilgamesh proposes a journey to the cedar forest to Enkidu, similarly as in older narratives. Enkidu is initially reluctant, and describes Humbaba as a fearsome being assigned to his position by Enlil:

In order to keep the cedars safe,
Enlil made it his destiny to be the terror of the people.
That journey is not one for the making,
that man is not one for the seeing.
He who guards the Forest of Cedar, his (...) are wide,
Ḫumbaba, his voice is the Deluge,
his speech is fire, his breath is death.
He hears the forest’s murmur for sixty leagues;
who is there that would venture into his forest?

However, eventually the two heroes decide to embark together. While leaving, Gilgamesh mentions Humbaba announcing his plans to the inhabitants of Uruk:

During the days we travel there and back,
until we reach the Forest of Cedar,
until we slay ferocious Ḫumbaba,
and annihilate from
the land the Evil Thing (Note: Akkadian: mimma lemnu, a stock phrase from exorcistic literature referring to undefined distant forces opposed to mankind, here presumably Humbaba.) that Šamaš hates

After a long journey Gilgamesh and Enkidu reach the cedar forest. After entering it, they hear Humbaba’s roar, which compared to the voice of Adad, the Mesopotamian weather god. A detailed description of his dwelling is preserved on the Sulaymaniyah copy, and constitutes one of the only known passages in Mesopotamian literature focused on landscape. It highlights the beauty of the entangled trees and states that the entire area was scented with cedar resin. Al-Rawi and George note that in light of the following passage, Humbaba himself is portrayed not as a “barbarian ogre”, but rather as a foreign ruler enjoying music in his court much like how a Babylonian king would, though the musicians entertaining him are animals rather than humans, reflecting a motif well attested in Mesopotamian art:

Through all the forest a bird began to sing:
[...] were answering one another, a constant din was the noise,
A solitary(?) tree-cricket (Note: Akkadian: zizānu; alternatively interpreted as a type of locust, or on the account of its apparently noisy behavior as a cicada.) set off a noisy chorus,
[...] were singing a song, making the [...] pipe loud.
A wood pigeon was moaning, a turtle dove calling in answer.
At the call of the stork, the forest exults,
at the cry of the francolin, the forest exults in plenty.
Monkey mothers sing aloud, a youngster monkey shrieks:
like a band(?) of musicians and drummers(?),
daily they bash out a rhythm in the presence of Ḫumbaba.

In a broken passage, Humbaba learns about the arrival of intruders in his forest, seemingly guesses that one of them must be Enkidu, who he already met in the past, and possibly expresses joy about their reunion. After a lacuna, the story resumes after the confrontation between the protagonists and Humbaba has already begun. The latter criticizes Gilgamesh for coming to his forest, declaring that he was following the “advice of an idiot fellow”. He also insults Enkidu, calling him “spawn of a fish, who knew no father, hatchling of terrapin and turtle”, highlights that he “sucked no mother's milk”, referencing the unusual circumstances of his birth and early life; the second insult clarifies the purpose of the first, as the animals mentioned are not mammals and do not consume milk in infancy. He once again remarks that he already met Enkidu in the past, insinuates that bringing Gilgamesh to his forest constitutes treachery, and promises to kill the latter and feed him to carrion birds. Nathan Wasserman points out that since the confrontation between the heroes and Humbaba takes place after Enkidu already became close to Gilgamesh and has been adopted by Ninsun, the insults in addition to targeting what can be assumed to be his vulnerable spot also undermine his newly acquired status as a member of Gilgamesh's family. After Humbaba's speech, Gilgamesh loses his bravado and doubts if he can succeed, but Enkidu encourages him to not give up and the battle begins, with the ferocity of the three participants splitting the mountain apart. It continues until Shamash sends thirteen winds to tilt the scales in favor of Gilgamesh. He earlier prepared them at the request of Gilgamesh's mother, Ninsun. Humbaba is immobilized and blinded, and starts to beg for his life. He praises Gilgamesh, highlighting his descent from Ninsun, and offers that if kept alive, he will guard the forest on his behalf. However, Enkidu urges him to ignore his pleas. Wasserman argues that while he did not respond to Humbaba's insults in the earlier section of the text, it can be assumed that his choice in this passage was likely triggered by them. Humbaba tries to ask him to change his mind, but he is ignored once again. Enkidu instead urges Gilgamesh to kill him quickly to avoid the anger of the gods who might hear about their actions, singling out Enlil and Shamash in particular. Humbaba's reaction is not fully preserved, but it apparently angers Enkidu, who once again tells Gilgamesh to kill him. Humbaba curses his captors in response:

May they not [...]
May the pair of them never grow old,
apart from his friend Gilgameš, may Enkidu have nobody to bury him!

This prompts Enkidu to urge Gilgamesh to act yet again, this time successfully. Gilgamesh pulls out a dagger and stabs Humbaba in the neck. Enkidu then eviscerates him and pulls out his teeth; it has been suggested that the passage draws inspiration from imagery associated with elephant hunts, historically performed in Syria by both Mesopotamian and Egyptian rulers, and that the teeth might specifically be elephant-like tusks. Al-Rawi and George note that while it was already known before the discovery of the Sulaymaniyah copy that the heroes are aware that the slaying of Humbaba would be an affront of the gods, which presumably indicates it was immoral from the point of view of the compilers, the passage highlighting this is better preserved in it, revealing that after Humbaba’s death Enkidu suddenly laments that their actions “have reduced the forest to a wasteland” and fearfully imagines Enlil questioning them. The same tablet indicates that afterwards the heroes decide to get rid of the only witnesses of the battle, the seven sons of Humbaba, apparently an otherwise unattested personification of his auras, partially tree-like and partially comparable to demons. Al-Rawi and George point out the similarity between this passage and references to the seven sons of Enmesharra, a primordial deity similarly killed alongside his offspring, possibly in order to guarantee the creation of circumstances favorable to mankind. This scene seemingly reflects the perception of Humbaba as an evil force who had to be vanquished, present elsewhere in the epic, rather than the speech directly preceding it, which the translators compare to the actions a murderer rapidly coming up with a justification for the act by blaming the victim, which according to their judgment adds “to the poem’s reputation for insight into the human condition” and marks the poet behind it as a “shrewd observer of the human mind”.

Subsequently Enkidu suggests to Gilgamesh that they should fashion a great door from the cedars to offer it to Enlil to avoid his wrath. They decide to transport it to Nippur to present it to this god in his temple Ekur. They also take the head of Humbaba with them. Frans Wiggermann suggests that it was affixed somewhere in the Ekur as a trophy. Daniel Schwemer in a more recent publication notes that it is not impossible this interpretation is correct, but states that the traces of the passage which would have to allude to this event do not support such a restoration of the text of the epic, making the fate of Humbaba’s head impossible to ascertain. It plays no further role in the narrative. Humbaba is nonetheless mentioned again when Enkidu relays the dream he had in which the gods judged his actions and despite the pleas of Shamash declared he has to die because of the role he played in the deaths of the guardian of the cedar forest and the Bull of Heaven, apparently with nearly immediate effect. Humbaba’s curse thus comes true. His demise is also mentioned by Gilgamesh when he introduces himself to the alewife Siduri.

==== Hittite and Hurrian adaptations ====
Myths about Gilgamesh were adopted by Hurrians and Hittites. Both Hurrian and Hittite adaptations and circulation of Akkadian texts are attested. However, according to Gary Beckman, at least in Hattusa they were only used as scribal exercises and possibly as courtly entertainment. In the Catalogue des Textes Hittites, all of them are classified under entry CTH 341.

The Hittite adaptation of the Epic of Gilgamesh, which shows a degree of Hurrian influence and uses a number of Hurrianized names, is known as the Song of Gilgamesh, though despite the title it is written in prose. It has been noted that its author seemingly showed a particular interest in the Humbaba narrative. The guardian of the cedar forest is first referenced when Gilgamesh states he would like to see him while meeting with Enkidu and a group of soldiers, seemingly serving as a replacement for the assembly of elders from the Mesopotamian original. The heroes similarly embark on the journey, cross the Mala river (Euphrates), and after sixteen days reach Humbaba’s dwelling. For unknown reasons the section of the narrative focused on Gilgamesh’s dreams about Humbaba was omitted, despite being preserved in the Akkadian version of the epic known to the Hittites. Humbaba notices Gilgamesh and Enkidu immediately after their arrival, and wonders why did they enter the forest. It is possible that the subsequent passage contains a reference to his musicians, best known from the Sulaymaniyah Museum copy of the Standard Babylonian version, which might indicate the events of tablet V of the latter version reflect an older tradition.

Humbaba spots the heroes for the second time when they start to cut down the cedars, and in anger confronts them, questioning their actions. They are then urged to kill him by the Sun god of Heaven, who unlike his Mesopotamian counterpart interacts with them directly. Humbaba then formally challenges Gilgamesh and Enkidu:

[Ḫuwawa] said to them: “I will […] you up, and I will carry you to the heaven! I will smash you on the skull, and I will bring you down to the dark earth!”

The passage finds no direct parallel in other versions, but Gary Beckman notes similar scenes are typical for myths known from Hittite archives dated to the imperial period, and compares it to the stone giant Ullikummi taunting his adversary, the Hurrian weather god Teshub, in one of the myths belonging to the Kumarbi Cycle. A description of a fight follows. It contains elements absent from the Akkadian original, namely Gilgamesh and Enkidu dragging Humbaba by the hair, as well as apparent involvement of animals referred to simply as unidentified “equids” by Mary R. Bachvarova but as “posted horses” by Beckman in a more recent treatment of the text. Gilgamesh is then temporarily incapacitated by a dust cloud and asks the Sun god of Heaven for help, receiving nine (rather than thirteen, like in the Akkadian version) winds as a result, which leads to the immobilization of Humbaba, who offers to become his slave:

Huwawa said to Gilgamesh, “Release me, O Gilgamesh! You shall be my lord and I shall be your slave. Take(?) the cedars that I have raised for you. I will fell mighty beams(?) for you in [… ] And a palace […]”

However, Enkidu advises him to show no mercy. Humbaba's death is not directly described in the surviving fragments, but it is agreed that like in other versions of the narrative, he was killed, as the event is referenced later on. When the gods discuss the deeds of Gilgamesh and Enkidu and determine the latter should be killed, the Sun god of Heaven argues in favor of sparing him as he acted on his behalf during the confrontation with Humbaba, while Anu considers this act unforgivable.

Due to state of preservation of the tablets and the still imperfect understanding of the Hurrian language, the Hurrian versions of Gilgamesh myths are impossible to fully translate, though it is agreed that the colophon of one of the fragments refers to it as “the fourth tablet of Ḫuwawa; not finished”. Mary R. Bachvarova proposes that this composition might have reflected the perception of Humbaba as a “local hero”. She argues that due to being portrayed as an inhabitant of northern Syria, he might have been an appealing character to western audiences, which in turn lead to retellings emphasizing his role. Yoram Cohen considers this proposal difficult to evaluate, though he tentatively accepts the existence of hitherto unknown western Humbaba-centric narratives as a possibility. The presumed existence of a standalone Hurrian Humbaba narrative might also support the proposal that a now lost Akkadian epic focused on the confrontation between him and Gilgamesh existed, as originally proposed by Daniel E. Fleming and Sara J. Milstein. The surviving fragments presumably do not constitute a direct adaptation of any Mesopotamian work, and according to Beckman can instead be compared to the incorporation of Mesopotamian motifs into the myths of Hurrian origin focused on Kumarbi. One of the fragments involves a woman pleading for the life of another, unnamed character, possibly Humbaba; while she is designated by the word šiduri, meaning “young woman” in Hurrian, it is assumed that she does not correspond to the barmaid Siduri, who instead bears the name Nahmizule in the Hurrian adaptation and some of the Hittite fragments influenced by it. It is however possible that in another passage Gilgamesh recollects the confrontation with Humbaba to the latter character. While the ending is not preserved, Bachvarova speculates that Humbaba might have either survived his meeting with Gilgamesh or Enkidu, or that his death was presented as a tragic event.

== Other textual sources ==
Humbaba is also attested in a number of textual sources other than the Epic of Gilgamesh and its forerunners. He is referenced in the so-called Ballad of Early Rulers. This text is known from Mesopotamia, as well as from Ugarit and Emar, and constitutes an example of so-called “wisdom literature”. The line mentioning him is preserved in multiple copies of the text:

Where is Ḫuwawa, who was caught in submission?

It seemingly reflects a tradition in which he did not die after his confrontation with Gilgamesh. The text of the Ballad of Early Rulers itself is, as argued by Bendt Alster, a drinking song-like composition which brings up legendary ancient rulers as a pretext to explain the need to enjoy the present. It references other works in a seemingly humorous context, with the message possibly being comparable to the later carpe diem motif. In addition to Humbaba it also mentions Alulim, Etana, Gilgamesh, Ziusudra, Enkidu, Bazi and Zizi. Presumably the large number of literary allusions was meant to make the composition entertaining for its expected audience, namely scribes well versed in the canon of Mesopotamian literature.

Multiple omens alluding to Humbaba are known from Mesopotamian omen compendiums, and based on the frequent use of the spelling Ḫuwawa in this context it assumed they reflect a tradition originating in the Old Babylonian period. They typically pertain to the appearance of both adult and newborn humans as well as newborn lambs, considered comparable to that of the mythical figure due to the presence of a bulbous nose and large eyes. Additionally, the entrails of sacrificial animals used in hepatoscopy could be compared to Humbaba’s face, and a depiction of him representing his face as resembling the intestines of a sheep is known.

One fired clay mask, made in 1800BC-1600BC, was excavated in Abu Habba (Sippar). It had a face that represents the intestines of a sheep examined for divination. It had 5 lines of Akkadian cuneiform inscription on the other side:

If the coils of the colon resemble the head of Huwawa, (this is) an omen of Sargon who ruled the land. If ...., the house of a man will expand. (Written by) the hand of Warad-Marduk, diviner, son of Kubburum, diviner.

A praise hymn dedicated to Shulgi, referred to as Shulgi O according to the ETCSL naming system, might allude to a tradition in which Gilgamesh captured Humbaba and brought him back to Uruk, with the reference to “your captured hero” (ur-sag dab_{5}-ba-zu) sometimes interpreted as a reference to the monster. This phrase is better attested as a title of various enemies of Ninurta and presumably indicates that after their defeat they were displayed as trophies.

A prayer to Dumuzi imploring him to hand over the petitioner’s tormentors to another deity possibly casts Humbaba in the latter role, though it is also possible the deity meant is Lumma or Humban. According to Gianni Marchesi, Lumma was most likely present in the original version of the text, while the author of one of the two known Assyrian copies, unfamiliar with this god, replaced him with Humbaba, despite the latter not being attested in the roles of a “gendarme-demon” or underworld deity unlike the former.

== Visual arts ==
Humbaba was commonly depicted in Mesopotamian art in the Old Babylonian period. However, often only his face was shown. Such depictions had an apotropaic purpose. An example has been identified as a decoration of the gate of an Old Babylonian temple excavated in Tell al-Rimah. Ornamental heads of Humbaba are also mentioned in multiple administrative texts from Mari and in a list of jewelry from Qatna. Multiple works of art showing the confrontation between Humbaba and Gilgamesh and Enkidu are also known, including clay plaques and cylinder seals from various locations in Mesopotamia and neighboring areas, and possibly a statue from the Louvre collection showing a hero standing on the head resembling these identified as depictions of Humbaba. While it can be assumed that depictions from Nuzi or from various Mitanni sites strictly reflect the Mesopotamian tradition, it is not certain if artists in western Iran or in Anatolia were necessarily using the motif in its original context, and might have instead reinterpreted it as a representation of unidentified local myths instead.

In later periods, the depictions of Humbaba are less frequent. Frans Wiggermann argues that he largely disappeared from visual arts after the Bronze Age, but a relief from Tell Halaf is presumed to be a first millennium BCE example, and according to Gary Beckman representations of Humbaba’s defeat at the hands of Gilgamesh and Enkidu have been identified from as late as the Achaemenid period. Wilfred G. Lambert cited a seal from Ur from this period as the youngest known work of art showing this scene he was aware of, but it has alternatively been interpreted as a nude woman playing with cupids. A possible late depiction of the face of Humbaba has been identified in a tomb in Petra, which was assigned the number 649 during excavations, though similar works of art from Mesopotamia are limited to the Old Babylonian period. Similar faces are also known from tombs from another Nabataean side, Medain Saleh. In neither case the identification is certain. Judith McKenzie noted that if accepted, Humbaba’s presence in Nabataean art would open the question whether Nabateans were familiar with the myths involving him.

=== Gallery ===
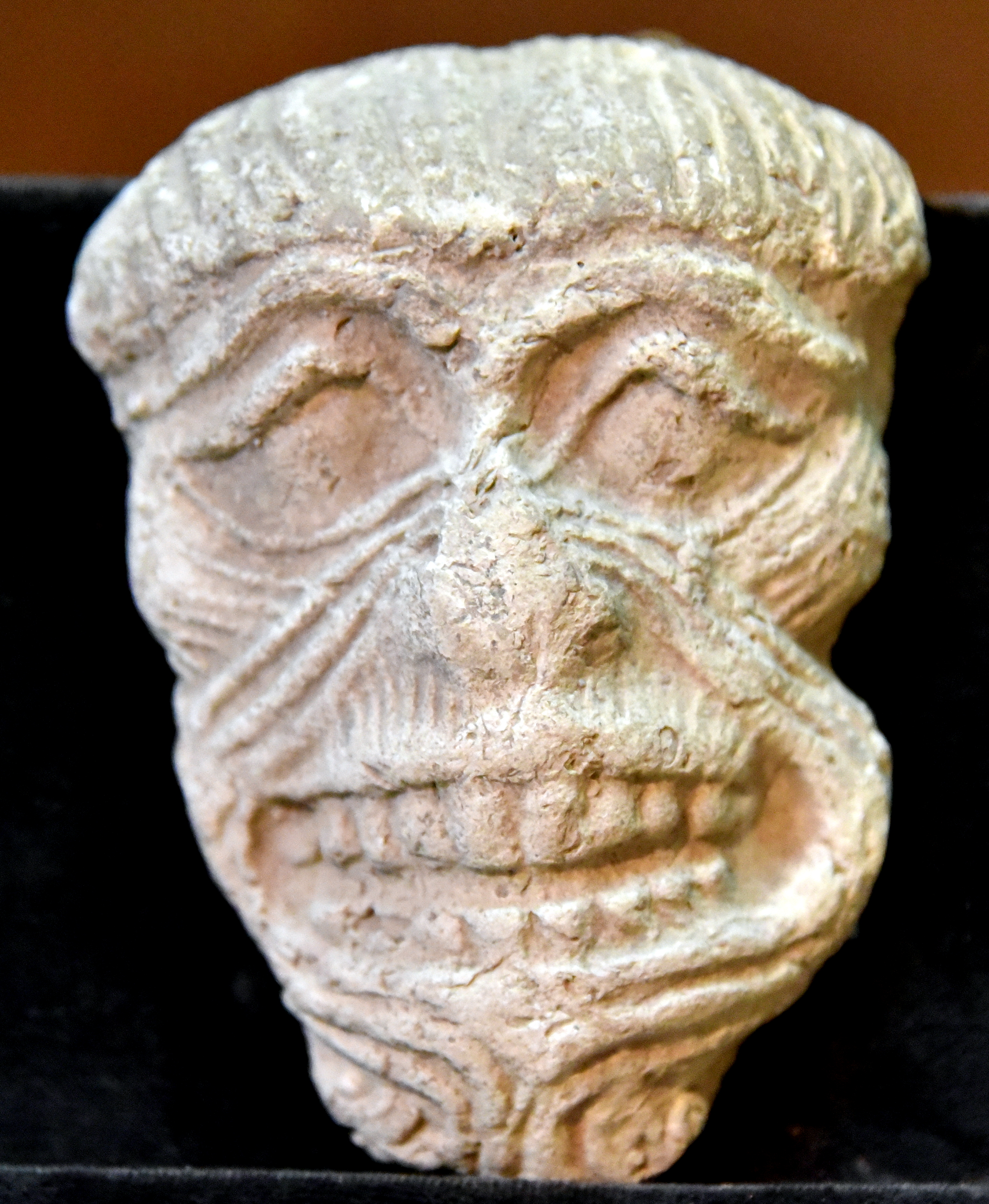
Terracotta Humbaba mask from Ur, Iraq. 2004–1595 BCE. Sulaymaniyah Museum, Iraq

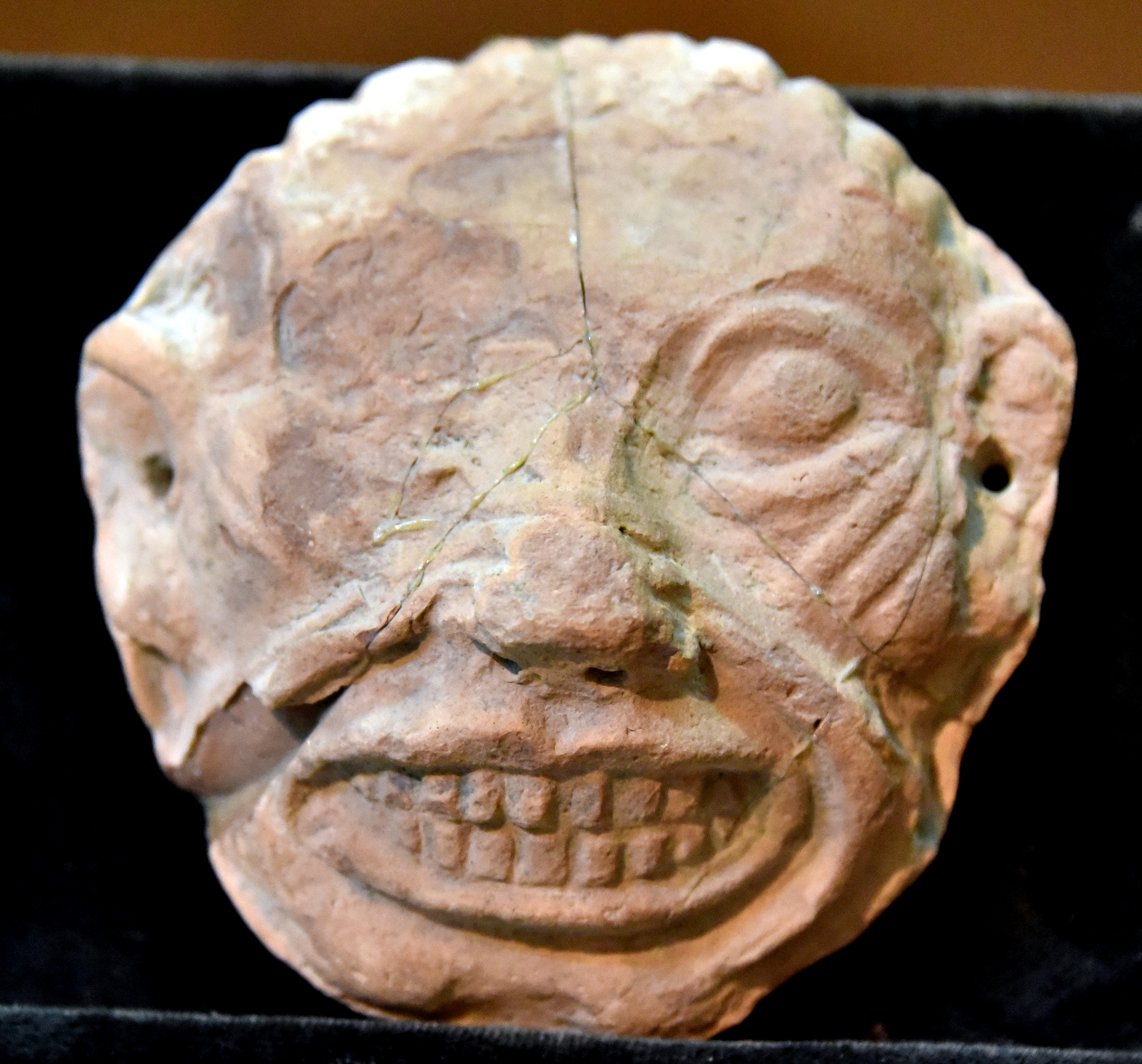
Terracotta mask of Humbaba from Ur, Iraq. 2004–1595 BCE. Sulaymaniyah Museum, Iraq

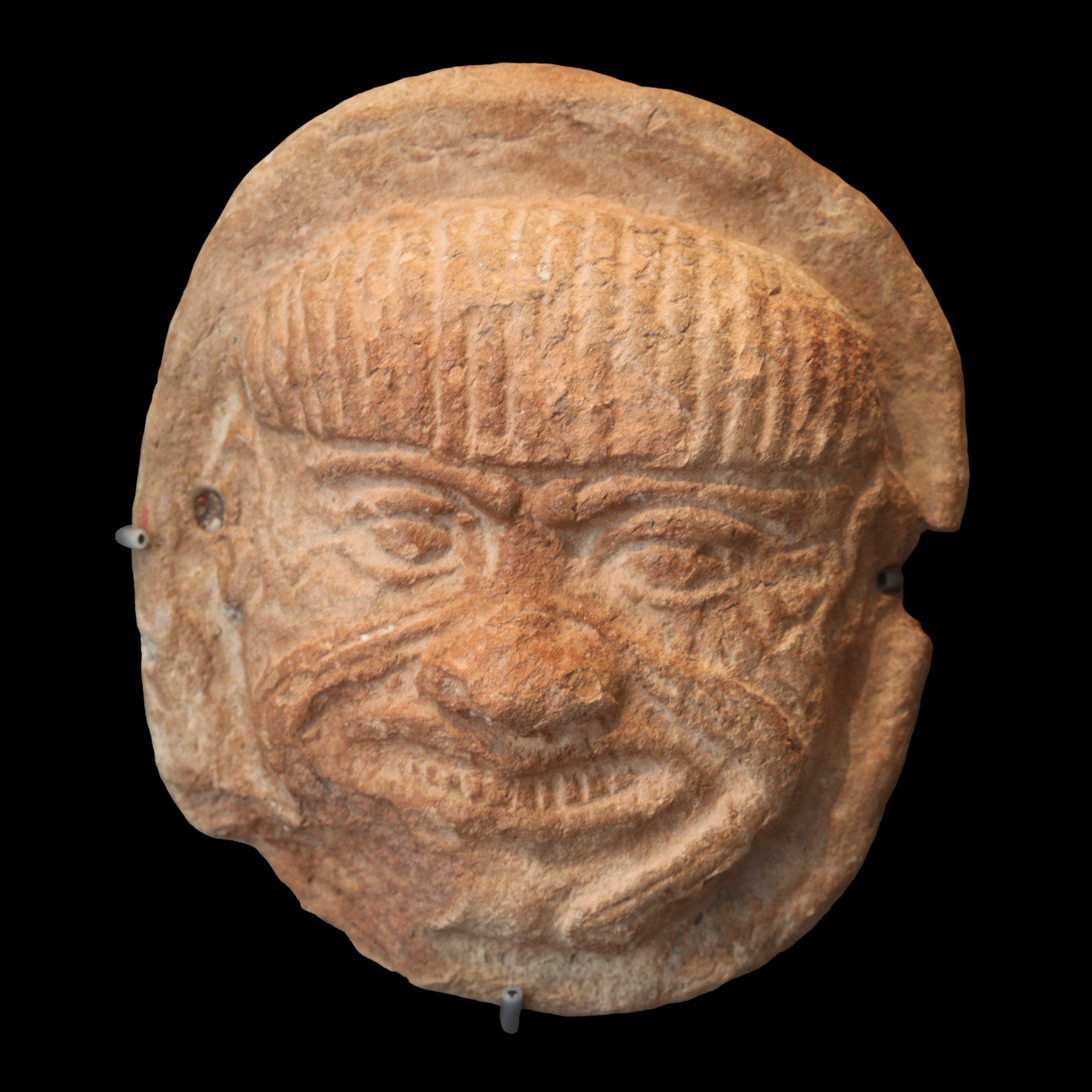
Terracotta plaquette with head of Humbaba, 2nd millennium BCE, Louvre Museum, Paris

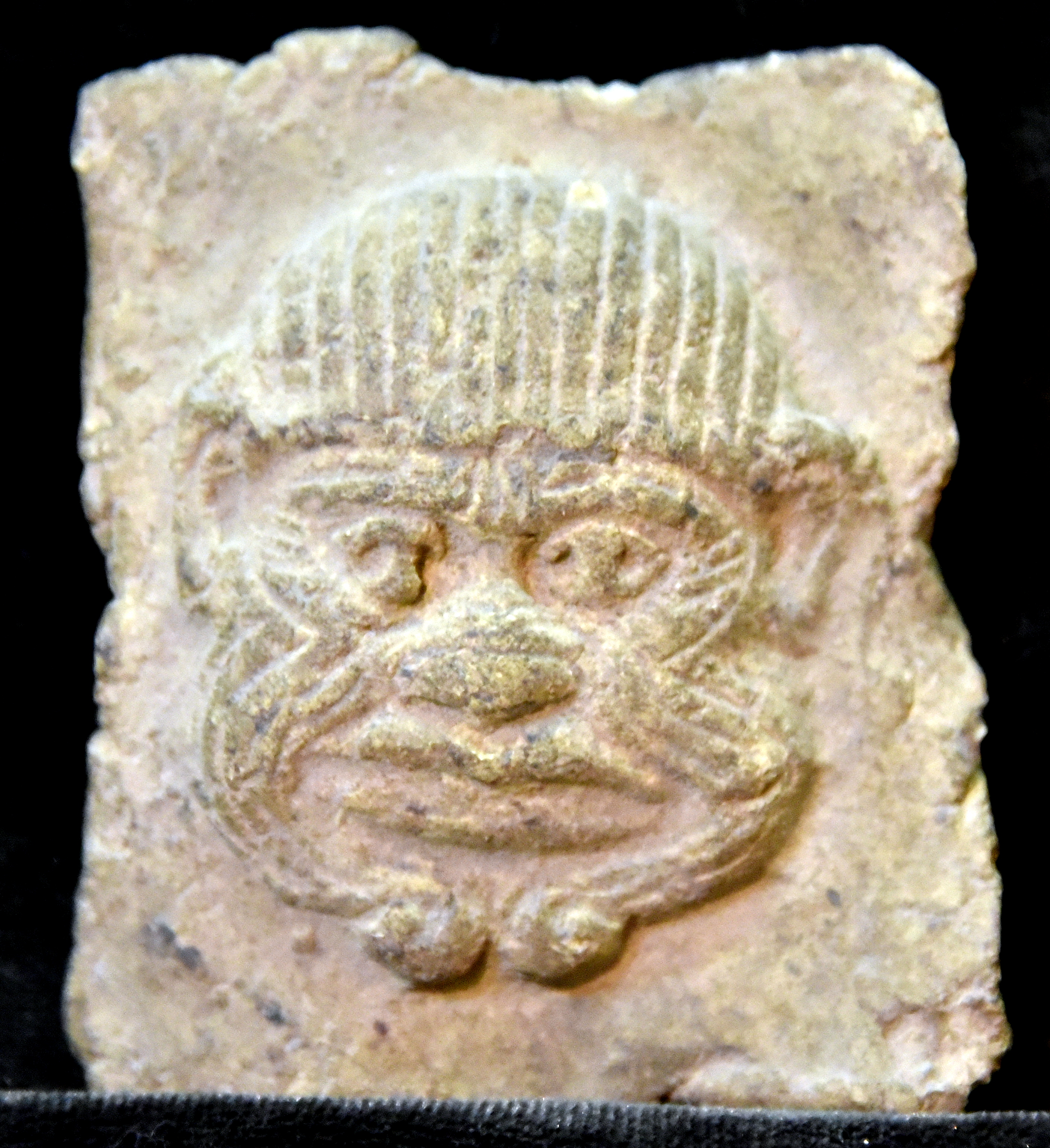
Terracotta plaque of Humbaba from Iraq. 2004–1595 BCE. Sulaymaniyah Museum, Iraq

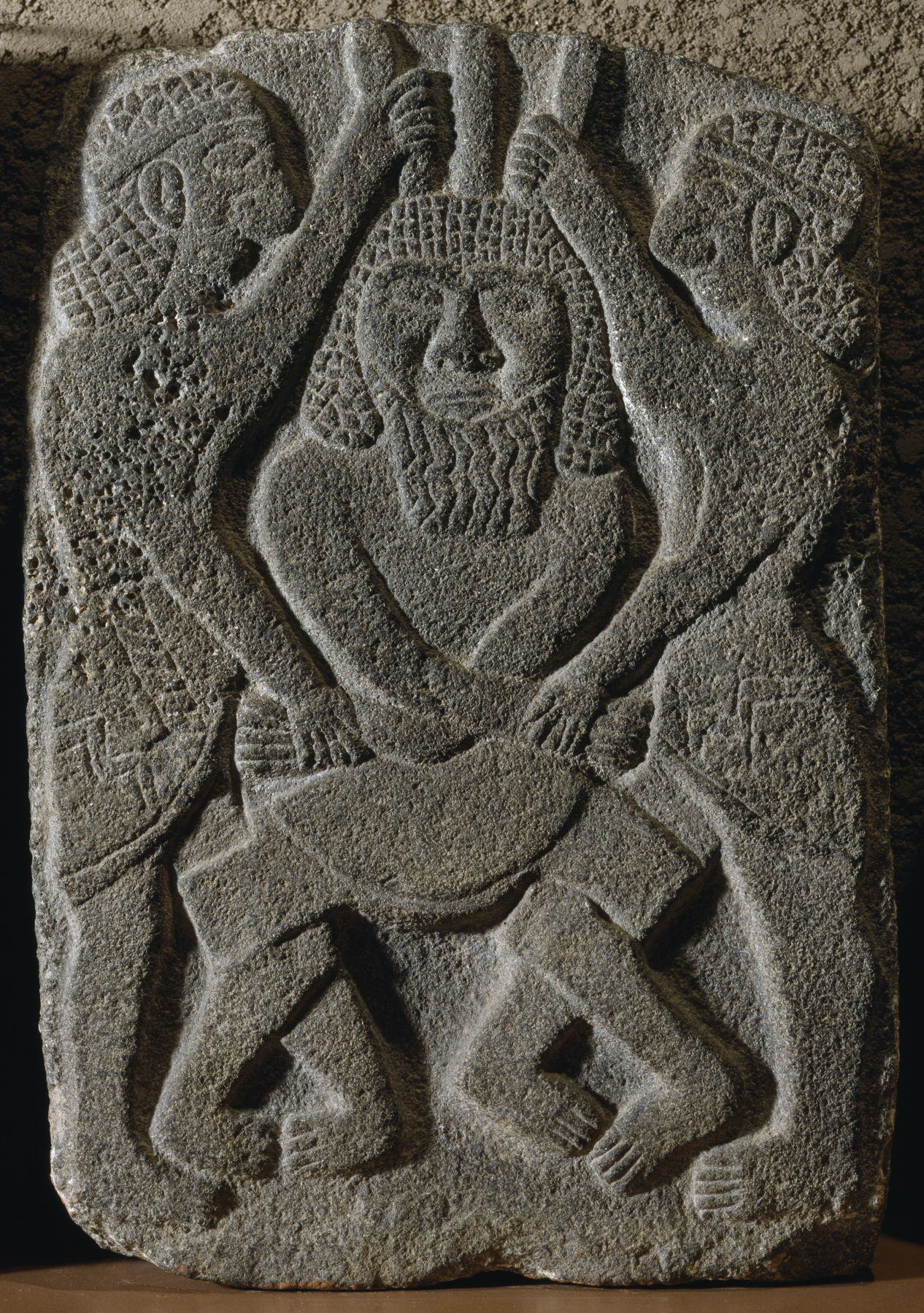
Neo-Hittite relief from Tell Halaf showing the defeat of Humbaba. Walters Art Museum, Germany.

=== Humbaba and Pazuzu ===
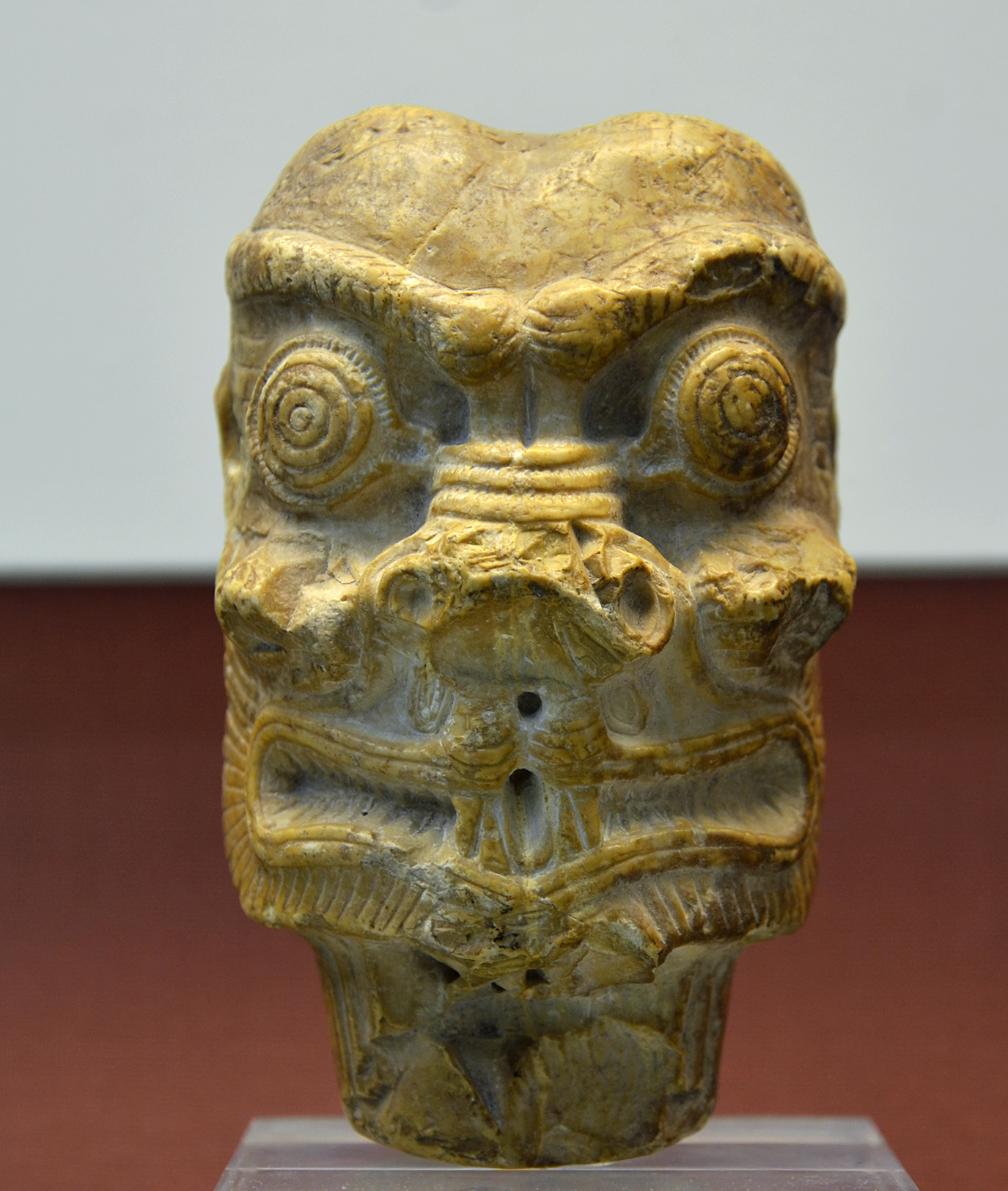
Stone head of Pazuzu. Neo-Assyrian period (900-612 BC). Room 56 of the British Museum

Frans Wiggermann has suggested that another Mesopotamian demon, Pazuzu, can be considered a metaphorical “successor” of Humbaba, as both were commonly depicted in the form of disembodied heads and had similar apotropaic functions. He highlights that a link between the head of Humbaba and the personified west wind, another possible forerunner of Pazuzu, is present in art, with the two sometimes appearing together; both of them were also believed to reside in western mountains. Eckhart Frahm takes a more cautious position than Wiggermann, and notes that while the heads of Humbaba and Pazuzu did seemingly fulfill the same function, there is little direct iconographic overlap between the two. Several other competing theories regarding the origin of Pazuzu can be found in Assyriological literature; Frahm notes it is possible the name derived from the sequence Bazi-Zizi, the names of two pre-Sargonic kings of Mari from the Sumerian King List. The view that Pazuzu might have been modeled on the Egyptian god Bes also found a degree of support among researchers, starting with Anthony Green in the 1980s.

Another possible successor of Humbaba is a lahmu-like figure shown as a vanquished adversary of the gods on seals from the first millennium BCE.

== Later relevance ==
=== Greek sources ===
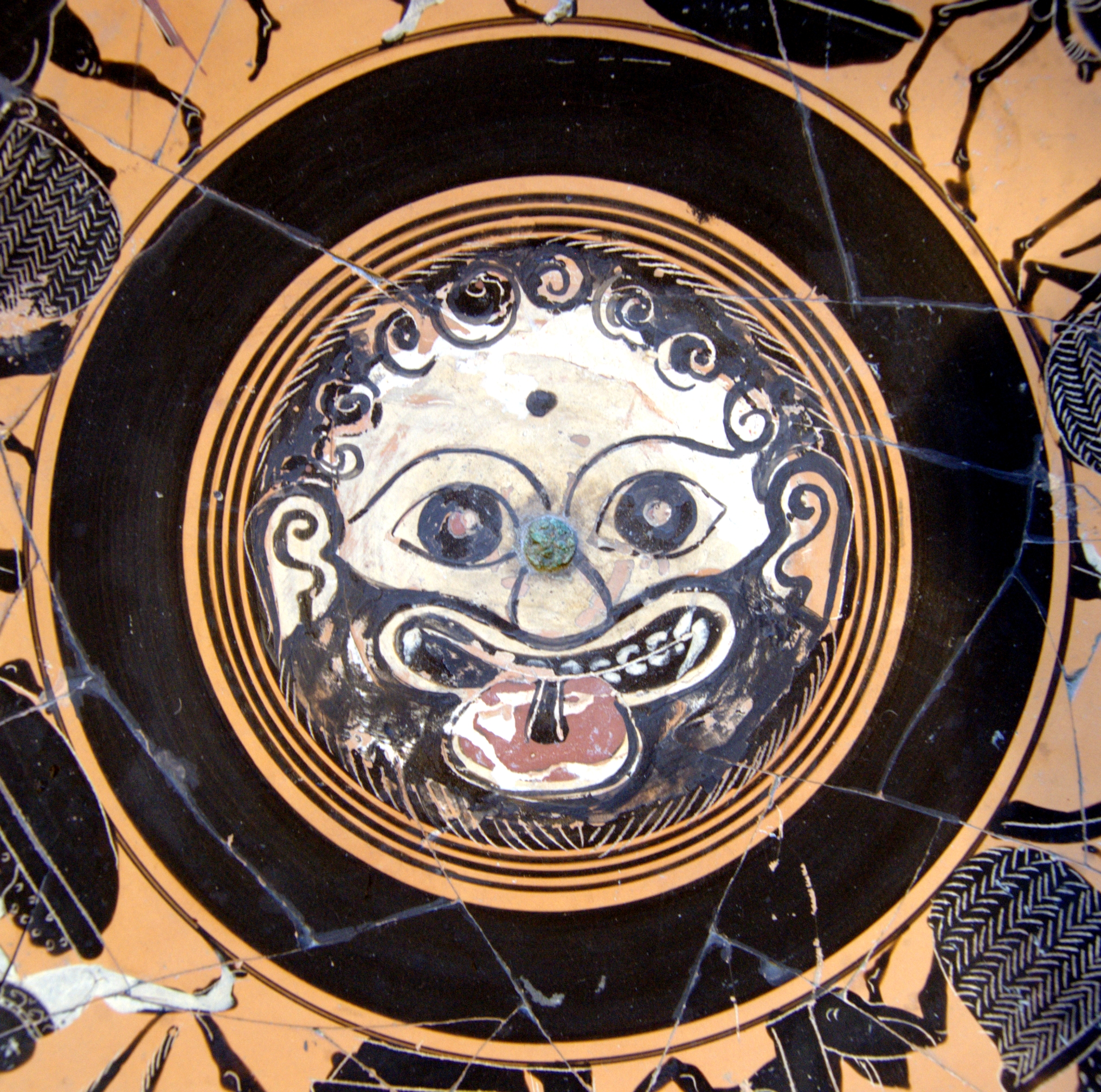
Greek gorgoneion painted in the glazing on the bottom of an Ancient Greek cup, end of 6th century BCE, National Library of France, Paris

It is assumed that the iconography of Humbaba influenced the image of Greek gorgons. Apotropaic functions are similarly attested for depictions of their heads. Additionally, works of art showing Perseus killing Medusa with Athena’s help are considered a Greek adaptation of the Mesopotamian motif of Humbaba being killed by Gilgamesh and Enkidu. It is a matter of dispute if the art motif was transmitted alongside the myth it was rooted in. It is also unknown whether Greeks adopted a foreign motif to represent a preexisting local myth, or if either the imported art motif or the myth it was derived from influenced the formation of the story of Perseus.

=== Book of Giants ===
One of the eponymous giants in the Book of Giants, variously referred to as Ḥôbabiš, Ḥôbabis or Ḥōbāīš, is assumed to be derived from Mesopotamian Humbaba. The connection was first noted by Józef Milik. He is attested both in the Aramaic version from Qumran, which reflects an older Jewish tradition, and in a later Michaean adaptation written in Middle Persian, found in Turfan. While the same sources also preserve the name of Gilgamesh, reinterpreted as an evil giant, there is no indication that their compilers were familiar with the Epic of Gilgamesh, and they might have been aware of their names thanks to other cuneiform texts still in circulation in the first millennium BCE (for example omen compendiums) or from derived oral traditions. Yoram Cohen suggests that they might have been borrowed from an unknown western tradition about Humbaba. Matthew Goff proposed the author might have had indirect knowledge of the Epic of Gilgamesh which relied on information originally brought westwards by returning members of an eastern diaspora. The surviving sections do not indicate that either name is present in a context resembling the earlier Humbaba narratives, and according to Andrew R. George it is safe to say that both are only “incidental characters in a story that revolves around other giants and is unrelated to any episode of the Gilgamesh epic”. During an assembly held by giants, one of them, ‘Ohyah, informs them about “what glgms (Gilgamesh) has said to him, and what Ḥôbabis yelled”; the topic of this message is unknown, but apparently it inspired joy in the gathered crowd.

The form of Humbaba’s name preserved in the Book of Giants was seemingly also known to a number of later Arab writers, as indicated by a reference to a Manichaean “spirit of darkness” named Hummāmah in an Islamic polemic and to the presence of presumed corrupt forms of the name in incantations from the fifteenth century showing a degree of influence from Manichaeism, written by Al-Suyūṭī.

=== Disputed or disproved proposals ===
Attempts to connect Humbaba with the biblical Kenite Hobab are considered baseless, and the latter name is more likely to be derived from one of two unrelated Hebrew roots, either ḫbb ("cunning") or ḥbb ("kindness").

While accepted in older scholarship, a connection between Humbaba and Kombabos, a figure known from the writings of Lucian of Samosata, is not considered likely. The phonetic similarity between the names is most likely accidental, and the proposal relies on assumption that Kombabos is an unlikely amalgamation of Gilgamesh and Enkidu bearing a name derived from Humbaba’s.

It has also been proposed that a scene in the Apocryphon of Jannes and Jambres relaying how the mother of Jannes had a dream in which a sinner enters paradise as an intruder to fell a cypress tree reflects the Humbaba narratives, but this view is not regarded as plausible.
