= The Epic of Gilgamesh, or This Unnameable Little Broom =

This Unnameable Little Broom
- Directed by: Stephen Quay Timothy Quay; Keith Griffiths; Weiser Quay
- Written by: Stephen Quay; Timothy Quay; Keith Griffiths; Weiser Quay
- Produced by: Keith Griffiths; Weiser Quay
- Cinematography: Stephen Quay; Timothy Quay; Weiser Quay
- Edited by: Keith Griffiths
- Music by: Dick Walter
- Distributed by: Zeitgeist Films
- Release date: 1985
- Running time: 11 minutes
- Country: United Kingdom

Little Songs of the Chief Officer of Hunar Louse, or This Unnameable Little Broom, Being a Largely Disguised Reduction of the Epic of Gilgamesh, Tableau II (aka This Unnameable Little Broom) is a 1985 stop motion short film by the Brothers Quay. The film is loosely based on the first tablet of Epic of Gilgamesh. Boasting the longest title in the Quays' entire output, this 1985 film is generally known as This Unnameable Little Broom. The short began life as a proposed hour-long program Channel 4 exploring aspects of the ancient Babylonian Epic of Gilgamesh, one of the oldest known surviving works of literature, which would combine puppet animation, dance sequences, and live-action documentary elements. However, Channel Four were unsure about the project, and only agreed to fund a short animated sequence as a pilot - which is all that was ultimately made.

== Plot ==
In the film, Gilgamesh is a grotesque, Picasso-esque being who moves by tricycle and patrols his box-shaped kingdom that hovers above a dark abyss. The yellow walls are inscribed with calligraphic text and its seemingly vast expanse is randomly broken up by square holes from which medical hooks occasionally project. A table – a mechanism and a trap – concealing a pulsating vagina within one of its drawers, stands at the centre of Gilgamesh's domain. High above this space are strung high-tension wires, vibrating in the wind, one caught with a broken tennis racquet. First, Gilgamesh is seen setting up a bizarre trap to lure and catch the wild man Enkidu (who is depicted as a bird-like creature, partially made of genuine animal skeletons). Enkidu appears to live in a distant forest world visible through a hatch in the side of one of the walls of the floating kingdom. Gilgamesh is seen eating dandelion fluff during the opening credits before he finishes readying the trap. Once finished, Gilgamesh retreats to a room beneath the floor of the floating kingdom, awaiting Enkidu's arrival. Sometime later, Enkidu enters and becomes intrigued by a table with an anatomical, H.R. Giger/da Vinci-esque image of a woman's muscles (symbolizing the character Shamhat). The mechanism activates allowing Enkidu to look inside the image revealing a swaying piece of meat on a hook within the woman's body. A drawer on the table opens, revealing the pulsating vagina. Ecstatic, Enkidu begins to mount the table, which sets off Gilgamesh's trap, flinging him onto the high-tension wires. An excited Gilgamesh resurfaces, retrieving the ensnared Enkidu by means of a giant gold cloth. Gilgamesh binds his captive with twine, beats him with a spiked club, and brushes his wings before cutting them off with scissors. Gilgamesh cuts the twine binding Enkidu and as the gold cloth falls to the ground the viewer is given a shot of Enkidu's forest. The same fluff that Gilgamesh was eating earlier litters the forest floor and the viewer is allowed to observe an insect husk rapidly decay. In the end, Gilgamesh is seen riding frenzied circles around Enkidu, who is now trapped beneath the table-mechanism on which the trap was set.

== Themes ==
As a symbolic representation, Gilgamesh's world is one of evil and deceit, simultaneously laced with psychosexual tension and personal resonance for the Quays. The medical hooks, rusting scissors, and razor sharp high-tension wires all imply a castration theme, accentuated not just by the sadistic mechanical trap that Gilgamesh sets but also by the sequence in which he places two eggs on a slicing wicket, positioning them where his own testicles should be. Such brutal and sexually violent imagery would reoccur in the brothers’ other films, most notably in Street of Crocodiles, where organic materials are organized into representations of male genitals then pierced with tailor's pins.

== Differences between the First Tablet of The Epic of Gilgamesh and the film ==
In the epic poem Gilgamesh is King of Uruk and oppresses his citizens. In the Quays’ adaption he is lord over an isolated kingdom where he is the sole denizen.

In the Epic Enkidu is a Wildman created by the gods to distract Gilgamesh from his questionable activities. Enkidu is spotted uprooting traps, ruining a trapper's trade. Enkidu is then seduced by Shamhat, a temple prostitute, the first step in civilizing him. The Brothers version shows Enkidu first being seduced by Shamhat, leading him into a trap that Gilgamesh has set for him.

== Influence ==
The film had many inspirations besides the Gilgamesh legend. The violence that pervades the film is a tribute to Austrian writer Konrad Bayer, the physical design of Gilgamesh was based on artwork by Heinrich Anton Müller, one of a trio of artists that the Quays originally intended to dedicate their film to.

'Hunar Louse' is a satirical representation of Lunar House in London, the headquarters of the UK Border Agency, which called the Quays' visa status into question at the time they were making the film. Though this was distressing at the time, the experience helped create the paranoid atmosphere that saturates the film.

== Release ==
The short film was released, alongside other shorts by the Quay Brothers, on May 14, 2020, on The Criterion Channel.
