= Nevit Kodallı =

Turkish composer

Nevit Kodallı (12 December 1924, Mersin – 1 September 2009, Mersin) was a Turkish composer of western-influenced classical music including operas and ballets. In 1948 he travelled to Paris where he studied with Arthur Honegger and Nadia Boulanger. He returned in 1953 and from 1955 he taught at the Ankara State Conservatory.

His work includes oratorios and ballets from Turkish history as well as operas on the subjects of Gilgamesh and Vincent van Gogh.
