= Mashu =

Mythical cosmological mountain

Mashu, as described in the Epic of Gilgamesh of Mesopotamian mythology, is a great cedar mountain with roots that reach the underworld and peaks that reach the heavens, through which the hero-king Gilgamesh passes via a tunnel on his journey to Dilmun after leaving the Cedar Forest, a forest of ten thousand leagues span. Siduri, the alewife, lived on the shore, associated with "the Waters of Death" that Gilgamesh had to cross to reach Utnapishtim in search of the secret of eternal life.

== Possible real location reference for story ==
The corresponding location in reality has been the topic of speculation as no confirming evidence has been found. Jeffrey H. Tigay suggests that in the Sumerian version, through its association with the sun god Utu, "the Cedar Mountain is implicitly located in the east, whereas in the Akkadian versions, Gilgamesh's destination (is) removed from the east" and "explicitly located in the north west, in or near Lebanon".

== See also ==
- Levant
- Middle East
- Jabal Shams
