= Death of Gilgamesh =

Sumerian poem

The Death of Gilgamesh is a Sumerian poem about the death of the legendary hero Gilgamesh, best known in later sources from Epic of Gilgamesh. The text was reconstructed by Samuel Noah Kramer, who produced a critical edition and translation of the text in 1944.

According to the Death of Gilgamesh, Gilgamesh was on a pursuit of attaining immortality. However, he learns that the god-king Enlil has destined him to a mortal life, though he also has granted him kingship, heroism in battle, and other great qualities. Thereafter, the text describes Gilgamesh's death, and ends with a lament over his death.

Other Sumerian Gilgamesh stories include Gilgamesh, Enkidu, and the Netherworld (GEN), Gilgamesh and Huwawa, and Gilgamesh and the Bull of Heaven. Some historians believe that these four stories used to all belong to one larger Sumerian Gilgamesh cycle, which began with GEN and ended by the Death of Gilgamesh, with the other two texts belonging to an unclear order between the two of them.
