= Theodore Kwasman =

American Assyriologist

Theodore Kwasman is an American Assyriologist and professor for Jewish studies. He is best known for his discovery of the first lines of the Epic of Gilgamesh.

== Life ==
Theodore Kwasman was born in New York and began his studies at the University of California, Los Angeles, where he read Northwest Semitic languages with Stanislav Segert and Ethiopic languages with Wolf Leslau. He continued his university education at Heidelberg University, where he passed his doctorate under the Assyriologist Karlheinz Deller.

He started his academic career at the Center for Jewish Studies Heidelberg, after which he became Professor for Jewish Studies at the University of Duisburg-Essen. A few years later he moved to the Martin-Buber-Institut für Judaistik at the University of Cologne from where he retired in 2015.

In 1998, he discovered among the cuneiform tablets of the Kouyunjik Collection in the British Museum the first lines of the Epic of Gilgamesh.

== Academic works (selection) ==
- Untersuchung zu Einbandfragmenten und ihre Beziehung zum Palästinischen Talmud (Heidelberg, 1986).
- Legal Transactions of the royal court of Niniveh Part I: Tiglath-Pileser III through Esarhaddon, State Archives of Assyria VI, edited by Theodore Kwasman and Simo Parpola (Helsinki, 1991), ISBN 951-570-001-9.
- Neo-Assyrian Legal Documents in the Kouyunjik Collection of the British Museum, Studia Pohl: Series Maior 14 (Rome, 1988), ISBN 88-7653-587-X.
- together with Christa Müller-Kessler, A Unique Talmudic Aramaic Incantation Bowl, Journal of the American Oriental Society 120 (2000), pp. 159–165.
- Two Aramaic Legal Documents, Bulletin of the School of Oriental and African Studies 63 (2000), pp. 274–283.
- Der Dämon des Daches. Über Epilepsie in jüdischen Quellen, Heilkunde und Hochkultur. Geburt, Seuche und Traumdeutung in den antiken Zivilisationen des Mittelmeerraumes, edited by A. Karenberg and Ch. Leitz (Münster, 2000), pp. 35–43.
- Look it up in...? Aramaic Lexicography. Some General Observations, Aramaic Studies 1 (2003), pp. 191–209.
- together with Markham Judah Geller, Two More Triangular Aramaic Tablets, Shlomo. Studies in Epigraphy, Iconography, Historyand Archaeology in Honor of Shlomo Moussaieff, edited by R. Deutsch (Tel Aviv-Yafo 2003), pp. 99–104.
- together with Ada Rapoport-Albert, Late Aramaic. The Literary and Linguistic Context of the "Zohar", Aramaic Studies 4 (2006), 5-19.
- A New Assyrian Royal Funerary Text, Of God(s), Trees, Kings, and Scholars. Neo-Assyrian and Related Studies in Honour of Simo Parpola edited by Mikko Luukko, Saana Svärd, and Raija Mattila, (Helsinki, 2009) 111-125, ISBN 978-951-9380-72-8.
- Hebrew Graffiti on Ardashir I's Relief at Naqsh-i Rustam, Iranica Antiqua 47 (2012), pp. 399–403.
- A New Dictionary of Jewish Babylonian Aramaic, Journal of the American Oriental Society 132 (2012), pp. 73–95.
- Some Remarks on the so-called "Bird Text", ISIMU 20-21 (2017-2018), pp. 205–220.
