= Joseph Weiss =

Joseph Weiss may refer to:

- Joseph Weiß (1486/87–1565), German Renaissance painter
- Joseph G. Weiss (1918–1969), scholar of Jewish Mysticism and Hasidism
- Joseph Hirsch Weiss (1800–1881), Hungarian rabbi
- Joseph Joshua Weiss (1905–1972), Jewish-Austrian chemist
- Joseph Meir Weiss (1838–1909), Hungarian rabbi and founder of the Spinka Hasidic dynasty
