= Epic of Gilgamesh =

Epic poem from Mesopotamia

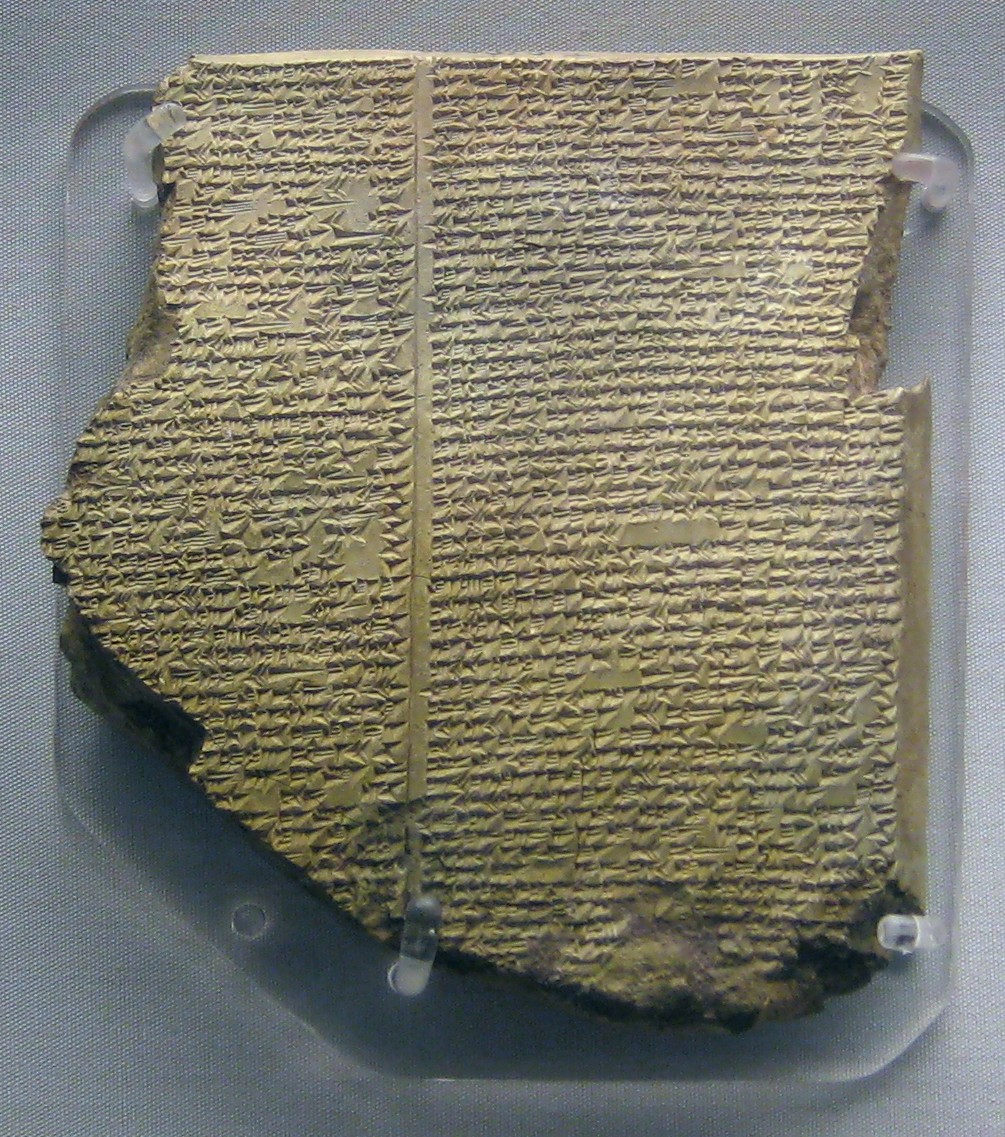
- The Deluge tablet of the Gilgamesh epic in Akkadian
- Written: c. 2100 – c. 1200 BCE
- Country: Mesopotamia
- Language: Originally Sumerian, subsequent translations in Akkadian
- Media type: Clay tablet

Full text
- Epic of Gilgamesh at Wikisource

The Epic of Gilgamesh (/ˈɡɪlɡəmɛʃ/) is an epic from ancient Mesopotamia that is the world's oldest surviving example of narrative literature. The literary history of Gilgamesh begins with five Sumerian poems about Gilgamesh, (Note: Some modern literature indicates that Gilgamesh was the Akkadian form of the name, while the original Sumerian was Bilgamesh; other scholars suggest that both forms were current in Sumerian. In "Reading Sumerian Names, II: Gilgameš*", Gonzalo Rubio analyzes various readings, and concludes that Bilgamesh was never current in Sumerian, but possibly appears in later antiquity due to misreading, folk etymology, or perhaps wordplay. Modern scholars would then have misinterpreted these occurrences as having preserved the original form of the name, or an early variant thereof, instead of having introduced a new one.) king of Uruk, some of which may date to the Third Dynasty of Ur (c. 2100 BCE). These independent stories were later used as source material for a combined epic in Akkadian. The first surviving version of this combined epic, known as the "Old Babylonian" version, dates to the 18th century BCE and is titled after its incipit, Shūtur eli sharrī ("Surpassing All Other Kings"). Only a few tablets of it have survived. The later Standard Babylonian version compiled by Sîn-lēqi-unninni dates to somewhere between the 13th and 10th centuries BCE and bears the incipit Sha naqba īmuru (Note: In 2008, manuscripts from the median Babylonian version found in Ugarit, written before the Standard version, already started with Sha naqba īmuru.) ("He Who Saw the Deep(s)", lit. "He Who Sees the Unknown"). About two-thirds of this longer, 12-tablet version have been recovered. Some of the best copies were discovered in the library ruins of the 7th-century BCE Assyrian King Ashurbanipal.

The first part of the story discusses Gilgamesh, king of Uruk, and Enkidu, a wild man created by the gods to stop Gilgamesh from oppressing his people. After Enkidu becomes civilized through sexual initiation with Shamhat, he travels to Uruk, where he challenges Gilgamesh to a test of strength. Gilgamesh wins the contest; nonetheless, the two become friends. Together, they make a six-day journey to the legendary Cedar Forest, where they ultimately slay its guardian, Humbaba, and cut down the sacred cedar. The goddess Ishtar sends the Bull of Heaven to punish Gilgamesh for spurning her advances. Gilgamesh and Enkidu kill it, insulting Ishtar in the process. The gods decide to sentence Enkidu to death by giving him a fatal illness.

In the second part of the epic, distress over Enkidu's death causes Gilgamesh to undertake a long and perilous journey to discover the secret of eternal life. Finally, he meets Utnapishtim and his wife, the only humans to survive the flood triggered by the gods (cf. Athra-Hasis). Gilgamesh learns from him that "Life, which you look for, you will never find. For when the gods created man, they let death be his share, and life withheld in their own hands".

The epic is regarded as a foundational work in religion and the tradition of heroic sagas, with Gilgamesh forming the prototype for later heroes such as Heracles (Hercules) and the epic itself serving as an influence for Homeric epics. It has been translated into many languages and is featured in several works of popular fiction.

== Discovery ==
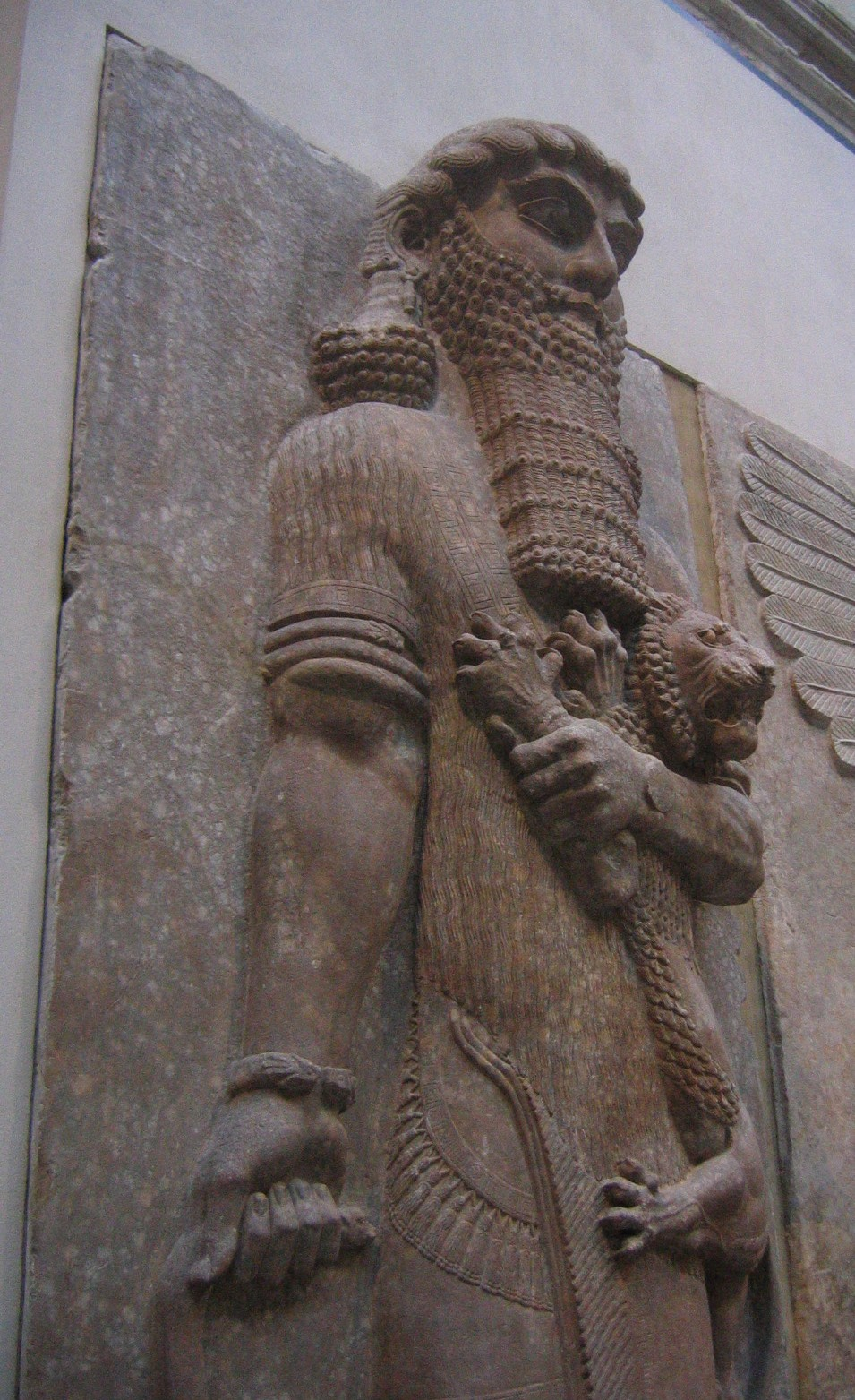
Ancient Assyrian statue currently in the Louvre, possibly representing Gilgamesh

...this discovery is evidently destined to excite a lively controversy. For the present the orthodox people are in great delight, and are very much prepossessed by the corroboration which it affords to Biblical history. It is possible, however, as has been pointed out, that the Chaldean inscription, if genuine, may be regarded as a confirmation of the statement that there are various traditions of the deluge apart from the Biblical one, which is perhaps legendary like the rest.

— The New York Times, front page, 1872

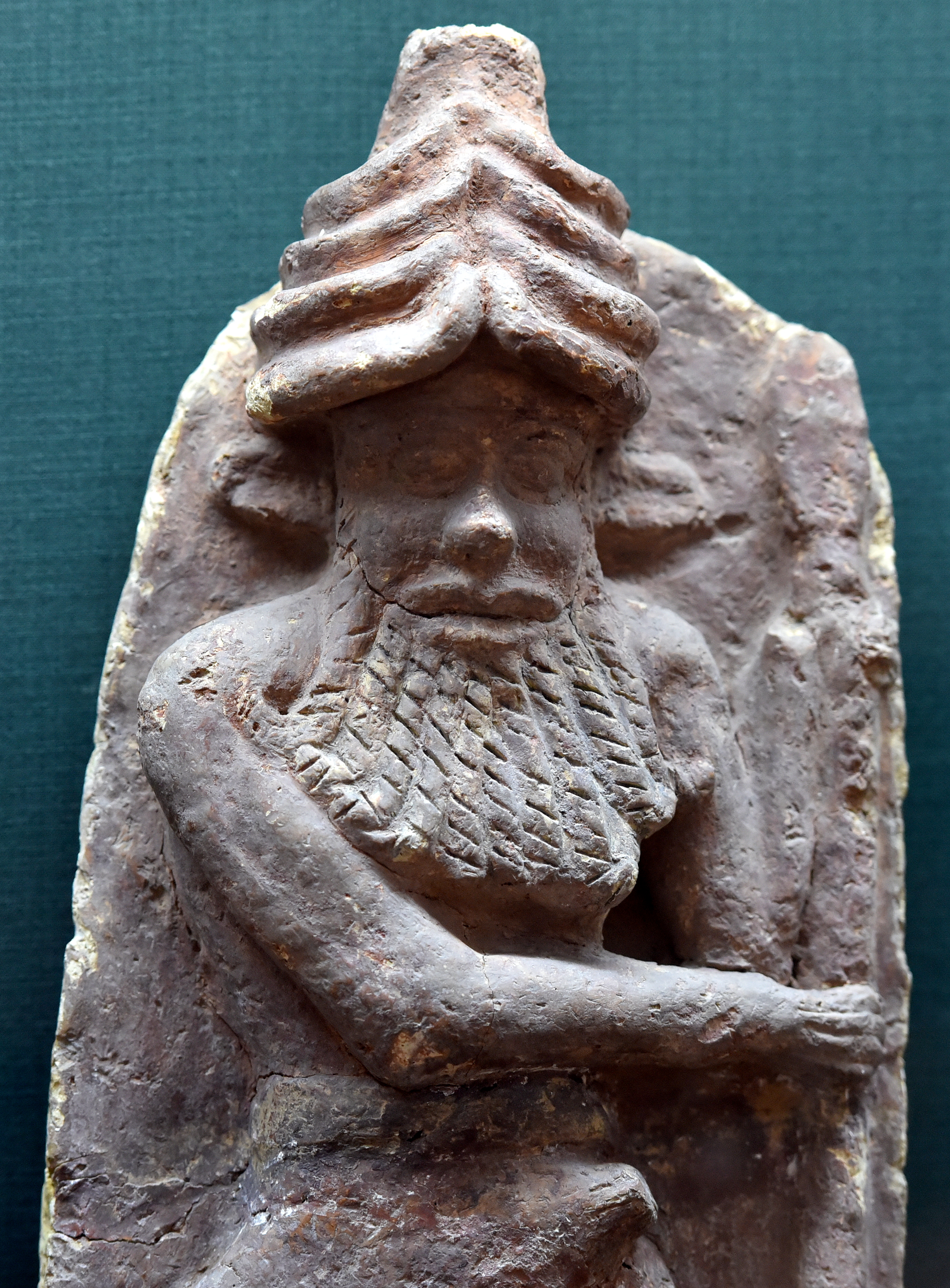
Enkidu, Gilgamesh's friend. From Ur, Iraq, 2027–1763 BC, Iraq Museum

About 15,000 fragments of Assyrian cuneiform tablets were discovered in the Library of Ashurbanipal in Nineveh by Austen Henry Layard, his assistant Hormuzd Rassam, and W. K. Loftus in the early 1850s. Late in the following decade, the British Museum hired George Smith to study them. In 1872, Smith read translated fragments before the Society of Biblical Archaeology, and in 1875 and 1876 he published fuller translations, the latter of which was published as The Chaldaean Account of Genesis. The central character of Gilgamesh was initially reintroduced to the world as "Izdubar", before the cuneiform logographs in his name could be pronounced accurately. In 1891, Paul Haupt collected the cuneiform text, and nine years later, orientalist Peter Jensen provided a comprehensive edition; R. Campbell Thompson updated both of their work in 1930. Over the next two decades, Samuel Noah Kramer reassembled the Sumerian poems.

In 1998, American Assyriologist Theodore Kwasman discovered a piece believed to have contained the first lines of the epic in the storeroom of the British Museum. The fragment, found in 1878 and dated to between 600 BCE and 100 BCE, had remained unexamined by experts for more than a century since its recovery. The fragment read "He who saw all, who was the foundation of the land, who knew (everything), was wise in all matters: Gilgamesh." The discovery of artifacts (c. 2600 BCE) associated with Enmebaragesi of Kish, mentioned in the legends as the father of one of Gilgamesh's adversaries, has lent credibility to the historical existence of Gilgamesh.

In the early 2000s, the Gilgamesh Dream Tablet was imported illegally into the United States. According to the United States Department of Justice, the tablet was encrusted with dirt and unreadable when it was purchased by a US antiquities dealer in 2003. The tablet was sold by an unnamed antiques dealer in 2007 with a letter falsely stating that it had been inside a box of ancient bronze fragments purchased in a 1981 auction. In 2014, Hobby Lobby privately purchased the tablet for display at the Museum of the Bible in Washington, D.C. In 2019, the Gilgamesh Dream Tablet was seized by US officials and was returned to Iraq in September 2021.

Since the establishment of the Fragmentarium project in 2015, additional segments of the epic stored on other tablets were added to pre-existing segments through machine learning analysis: as of August 2024, this has led to new segments of the epic being included in English translations published in print in 2020 and 2021.

== Versions ==
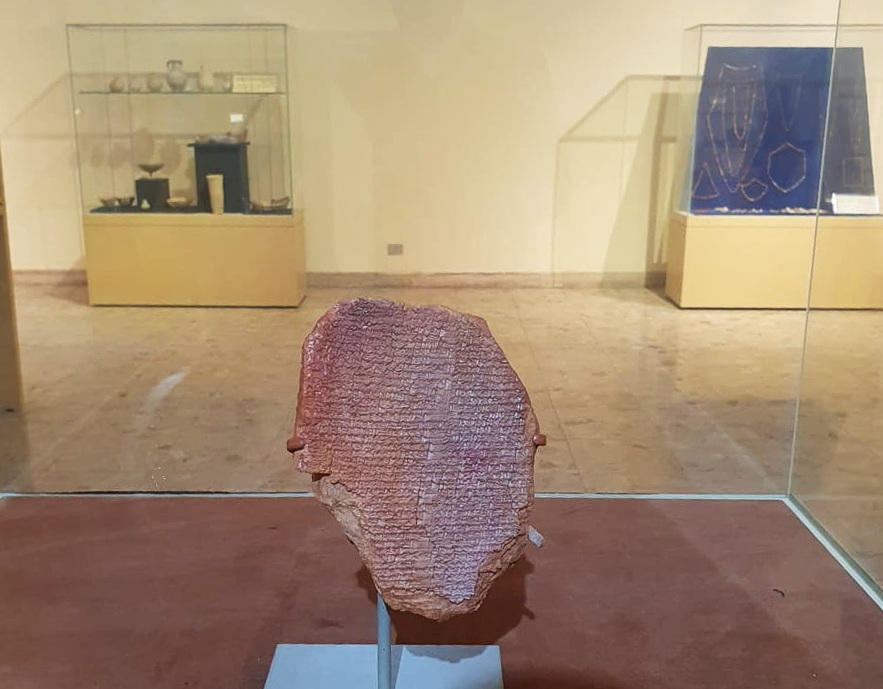
The Gilgamesh Dream tablet. From Iraq. Middle Babylonian Period, First Sealand Dynasty, 1732–1460 BCE. Iraq Museum, Baghdad. This dream tablet recounts a part of the epic of Gilgamesh in which the hero (Gilgamesh) describes his dreams to his mother (the goddess Ninsun), who interprets them as announcing the arrival of a new friend, who will become his companion.

Distinct sources exist from over a 2,000-year timeframe. The earliest Sumerian poems are now generally considered to be distinct stories, rather than parts of a single epic. Some of these may date back to as early as the Third Dynasty of Ur (c. 2100 BCE). The Old Babylonian tablets (c. 1800 BCE) are the earliest surviving tablets for a single Epic of Gilgamesh narrative. The older Old Babylonian tablets and later Akkadian version are important sources for modern translations, with the earlier texts mainly used to fill in gaps (lacunae) in the later texts. Although several revised versions based on new discoveries have been published, the epic remains incomplete. Analysis of the Old Babylonian text has been used to reconstruct possible earlier forms of the epic. The most recent Akkadian version, also referred to as the Standard Babylonian version, consists of twelve tablets and was edited by Sîn-lēqi-unninni, who is thought to have lived sometime between 1300 BCE and 1000 BCE.

From the diverse sources found, two main versions of the epic have been partially reconstructed: the Standard Babylonian version, or He who saw the deep, and the Old Babylonian version, or Surpassing all other kings. Five earlier Sumerian poems about Gilgamesh have been partially recovered, some with primitive versions of specific episodes in the Babylonian version, others with unrelated stories.

=== Standard Babylonian version ===
The Standard Babylonian version was discovered by Hormuzd Rassam in the library of Ashurbanipal in Nineveh in 1853. "Standard Babylonian" refers to a literary style that was used for literary purposes. This version was compiled by Sin-leqi-unninni sometime between 1300 and 1000 BCE from earlier texts. One impact that Sin-leqi-unninni brought to the work was to bring the issue of mortality to the foreground, thus making it possible for the character to move from being an "adventurer to a wise man." The Brazilian scholar Lins Brandão saw the standard version can be seen in this sense as "sapiential literature," ("wisdom literature"), which is common in the Middle East, but this idea has not been widely accepted.

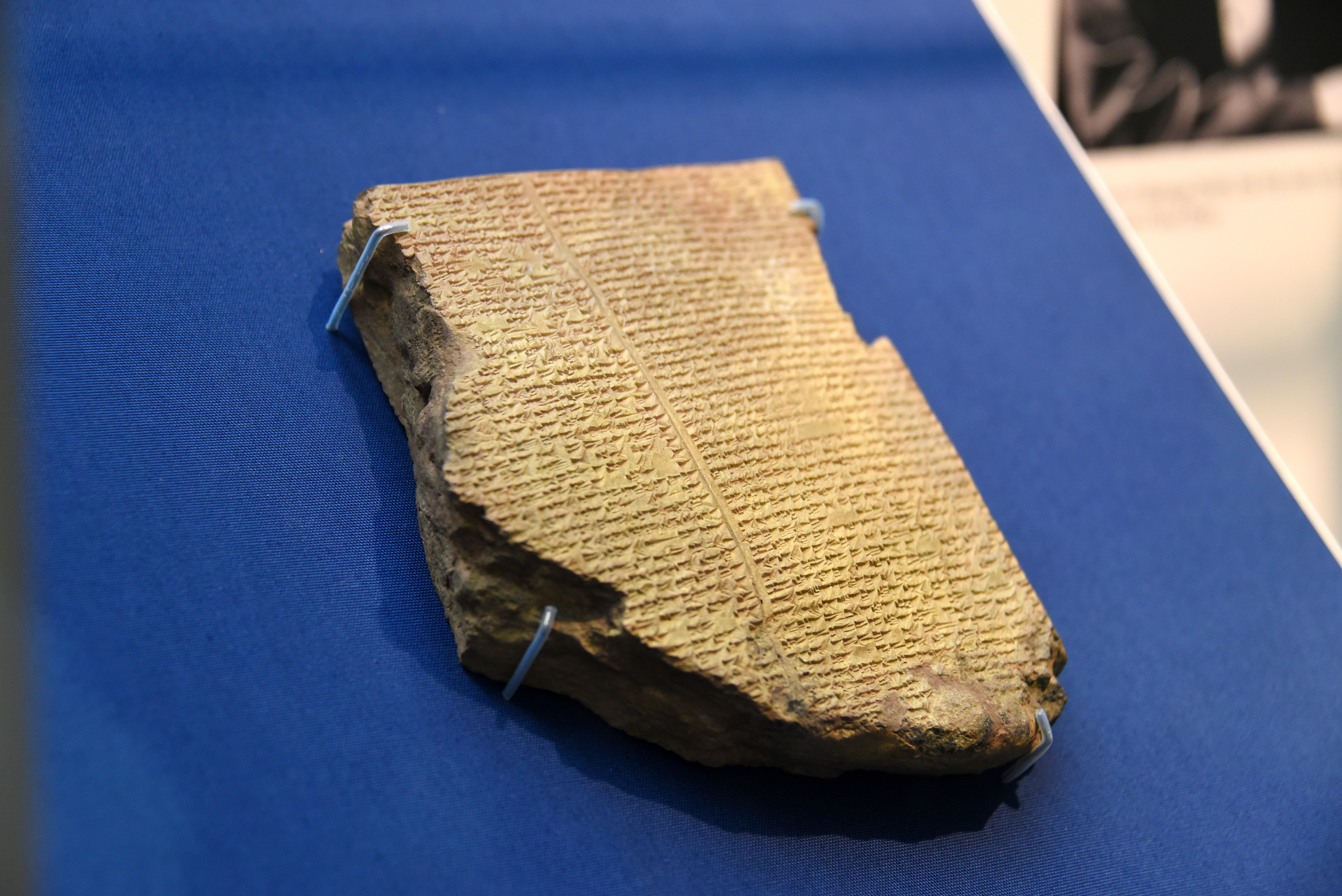
Tablet XI (or the Flood Tablet) of the Epic of Gilgamesh. British Museum.

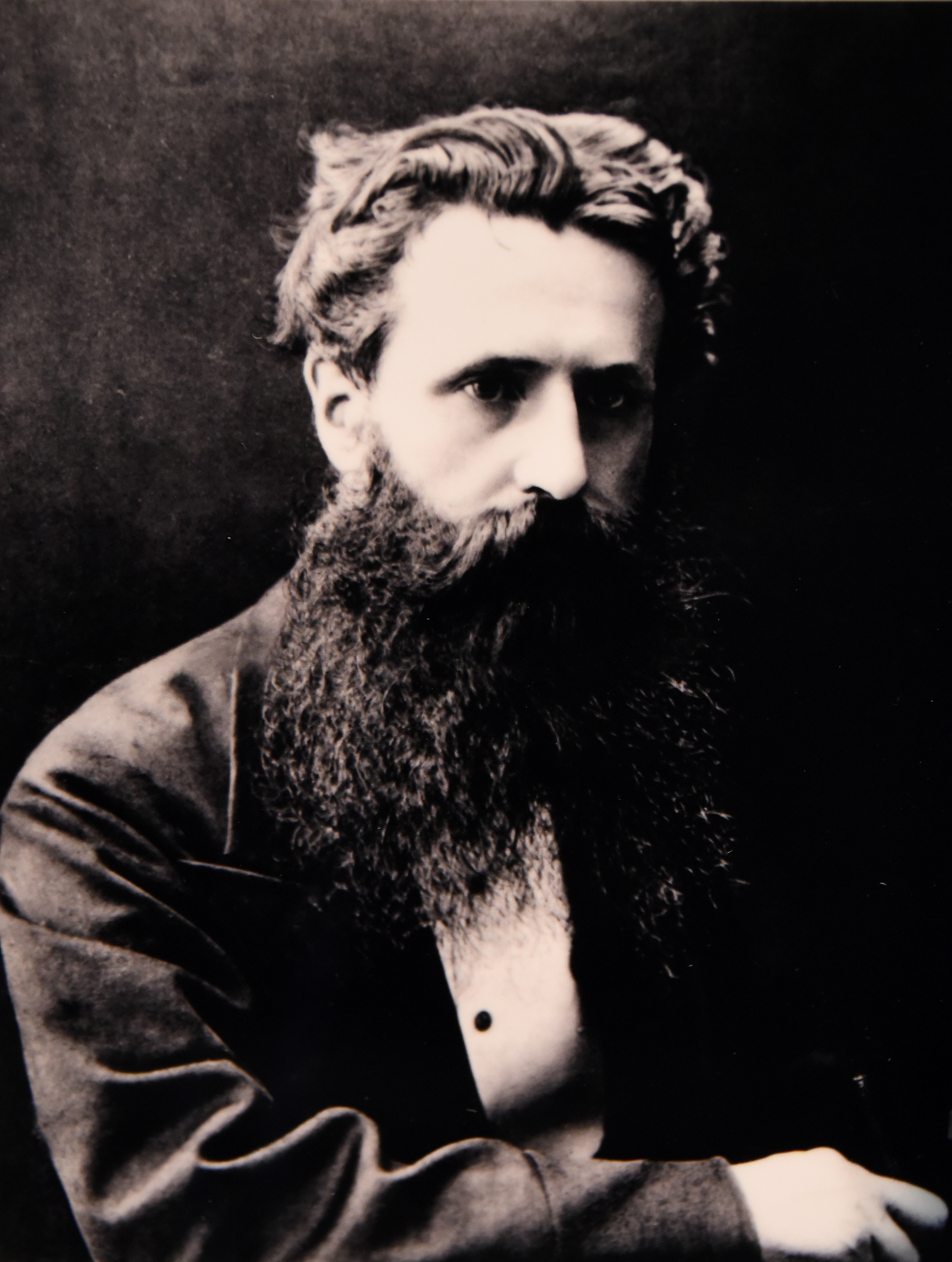
George Smith transliterated Tablet XI

The Standard Babylonian version has different opening words, or incipit, from the older version. The older version begins with the words "Surpassing all other kings", while the Standard Babylonian version has "He who saw the deep" (ša naqba īmuru), "deep" referring to the mysteries of the information brought back by Gilgamesh from his meeting with Uta-Napishti (Utnapishtim) about Ea, the fountain of wisdom. Gilgamesh was given knowledge of how to worship the gods, why death was ordained for human beings, what makes a good king, and how to live a good life. The story of Utnapishtim, the hero of the flood myth, can also be found in the Babylonian epic of Atra-Hasis. The Standard version is also known as iškar Gilgāmeš, "Series of Gilgamesh".

The 12th tablet is a sequel to the original 11, and was probably appended at a later date. It bears little relation to the well-crafted 11-tablet epic; the lines at the beginning of the first tablet are quoted at the end of the 11th tablet, giving it circularity and finality. Tablet 12 is a near copy of an earlier Sumerian tale, a prequel, in which Gilgamesh sends Enkidu to retrieve some objects of his from the Underworld, and he returns in the form of a spirit to relate the nature of the Underworld to Gilgamesh.

In terms of form, the poetic conventions followed in the Standard Babylonian version appear to be inconsistent and are still controversial among scholars. There is, however, extensive use of parallelism across sets of two or three adjacent lines, much like in the Hebrew Psalms.

==== Genre ====
When it was discovered in the 19th century, the story of Gilgamesh was classified as a Greek epic, a genre known in Europe, even though it predates the Greek culture that spawned epics, specifically, when Herodotus referred to the works of Homer in this way. When Alfred Jeremias translated the text, he insisted on the relationship to Genesis by giving the title "Izdubar-Nimrod" and by recognizing the genre as that of Greek heroic poetry. Although the relationship to Nimrod was dropped, the view of "Greek epic" was retained. Martin Litchfield West, in 1966, in the preface to his edition of Hesiod, recognized the proximity of the Greeks to the middle eastern center of convergence: "Greek literature is a Near East literature."

Considering how the text would be viewed from the standpoint of its time is tricky, as George Smith acknowledges that there is no "Sumerian or Akkadian word for myth or heroic narrative, just as there is no ancient recognition of poetic narrative as a genre." Lins Brandão suggested, though with little supporting evidence, that the prologue of "He who Saw the Abyss" recalls the inspiration of the Greek Muses, even though there is no assistance from the Sumerian gods here. In more popular treatments, Sir Jonathan Sacks and Neil MacGregor interpret the Epic of Gilgamesh's flood myth as having a pantheon of gods who are misanthropes willing to condemn humanity to death,

It is also made explicit that Gilgamesh rose to the rank of an "ancient wise man" (antediluvian). Lins Brandão continues, noting how the poem would have been "put on a stele" ("narû"), that at first "narû" could be seen as the genre of the poem, taking into consideration that the reader (or scribe) would have to pass the text on, without omitting or adding anything.

==== Content of the Standard Babylonian version tablets ====
This summary is based on Andrew George's translation.

===== Tablet one =====
The story introduces Gilgamesh, king of Uruk. Gilgamesh, two-thirds god and one-third man, is oppressing his people, who cry out to the gods for help. For the young women of Uruk this oppression takes the form of Gilgamesh raping brides on their wedding night. For the young men (the tablet is damaged at this point) it is conjectured that Gilgamesh exhausts them through games, tests of strength, or perhaps forced labour on building projects. The gods respond to the people's pleas by creating an equal to Gilgamesh who will be able to stop his oppression.

This is the almost invincibly strong Enkidu, covered in hair, who lives in the wilderness with his herd of animal relatives. He is spotted by a trapper, whose livelihood is being ruined because Enkidu destroys all his traps. The trapper tells the sun god Shamash about the man, and it is arranged that Enkidu will be seduced by Shamhat, a temple prostitute, as the first step in taming him. After six days and seven nights (or two weeks, according to more recent scholarship) of sex, Enkidu is 'weakened'; his herd flees in horror into the steppe. Enkidu is shocked by his loneliness, but Shamhat tries to comfort him: "Do not grieve, you now have knowledge, like the gods." Gilgamesh, meanwhile, has been having dreams about the imminent arrival of a beloved new companion and asks his mother, the goddess Ninsun, to help interpret these dreams.

===== Tablet two =====
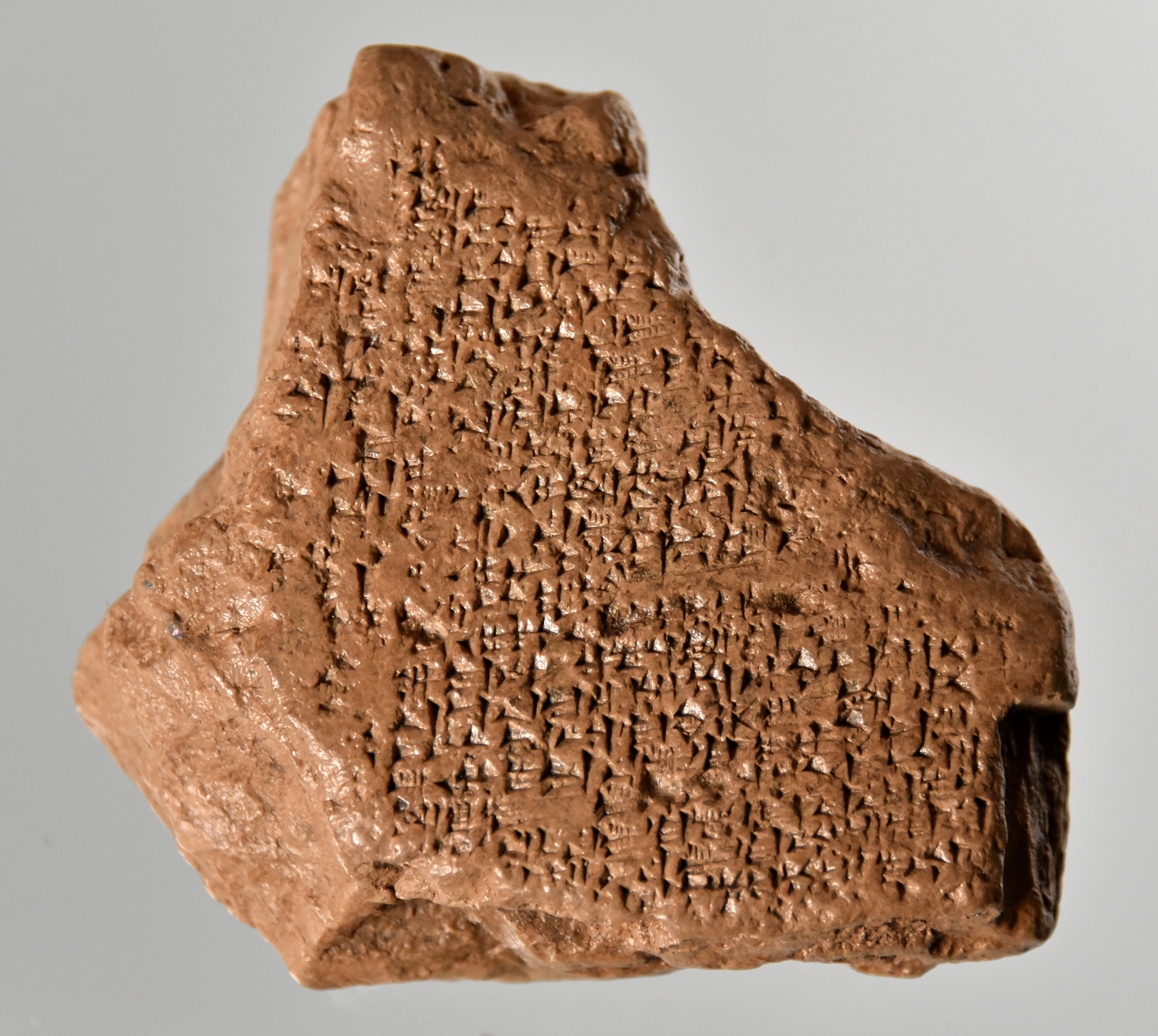
Fragment of Tablet II of the Epic of Gilgamesh, Sulaymaniyah Museum, Iraq

Shamhat takes Enkidu to a shepherd's camp, teaching him to be civilised: his hair is cut, and he learns to eat human food and drink beer. In the shepherds' camp, to whose way of life he has become accustomed, Enkidu is appointed night watchman. Learning from a passing stranger about Gilgamesh's treatment of new brides, he is incensed and travels to Uruk to intervene at a wedding. When Gilgamesh attempts to visit the wedding chamber, Enkidu blocks his way, and they fight. After a fierce battle, Enkidu acknowledges Gilgamesh's superior strength and they become friends. Gilgamesh proposes a journey to the Cedar Forest to slay the monstrous demi-god Humbaba in order to gain fame and renown. Despite warnings from Enkidu and the council of elders, Gilgamesh is not deterred.

===== Tablet three =====
The elders give Gilgamesh advice for his journey. Gilgamesh visits his mother, Ninsun, who seeks the support and protection of the sun-god Shamash for their adventure. Ninsun adopts Enkidu as her son, and Gilgamesh leaves instructions for the governance of Uruk in his absence.

===== Tablet four =====
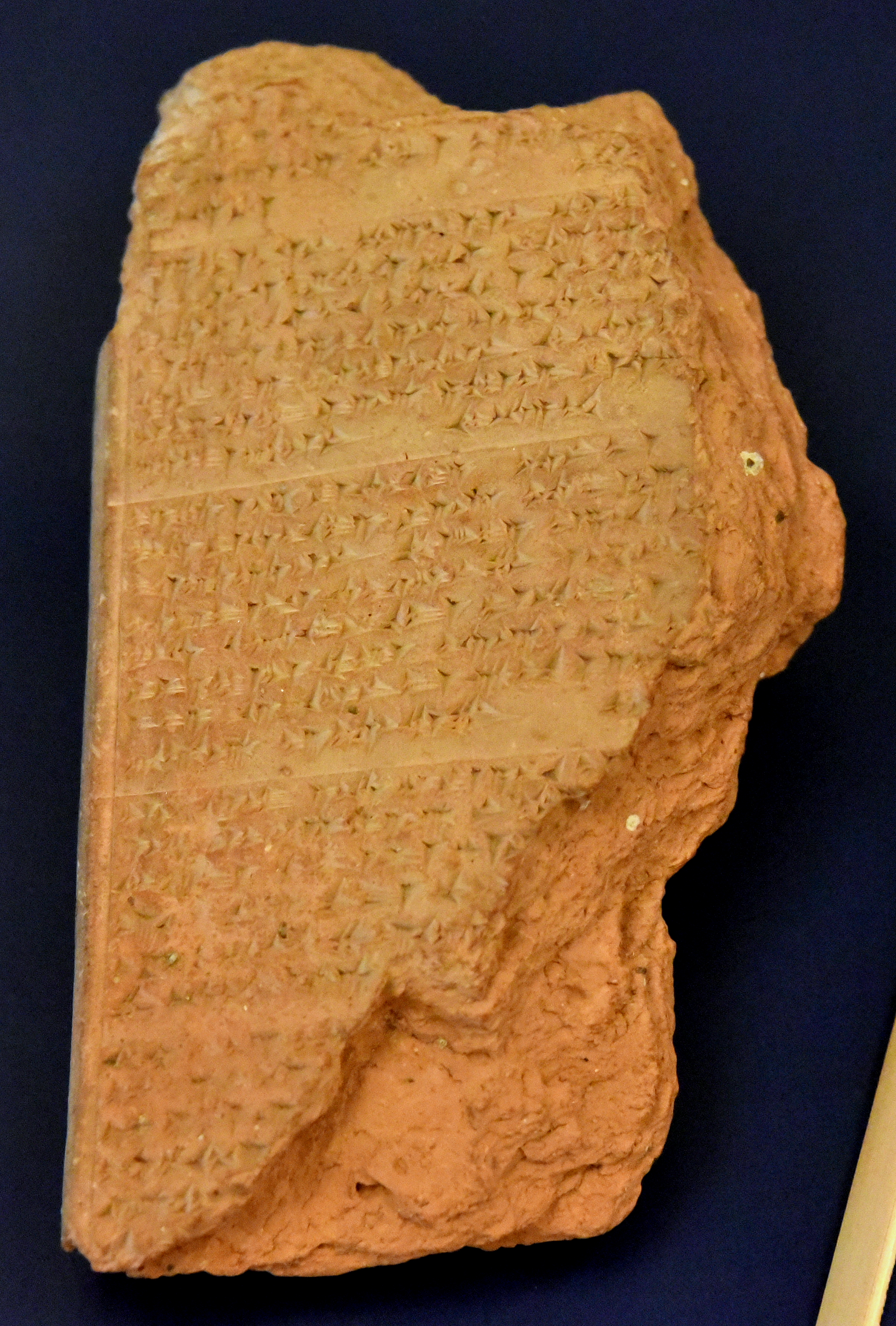
The second dream of Gilgamesh on the journey to the Forest of Cedar. Epic of Gilgamesh tablet from Hattusa, Turkey. 13th century BCE. Neues Museum, Germany.

Gilgamesh and Enkidu journey to the Cedar Forest. Every few days they camp on a mountain, and perform a dream ritual. Gilgamesh has five terrifying dreams about falling mountains, thunderstorms, wild bulls, and a fire-breathing bird. Despite similarities between his dream figures and earlier descriptions of Humbaba, Enkidu interprets these dreams as good omens, and denies that the frightening images represent the forest guardian. As they approach the cedar mountain, they hear Humbaba bellowing, and have to encourage each other not to be afraid.

===== Tablet five =====
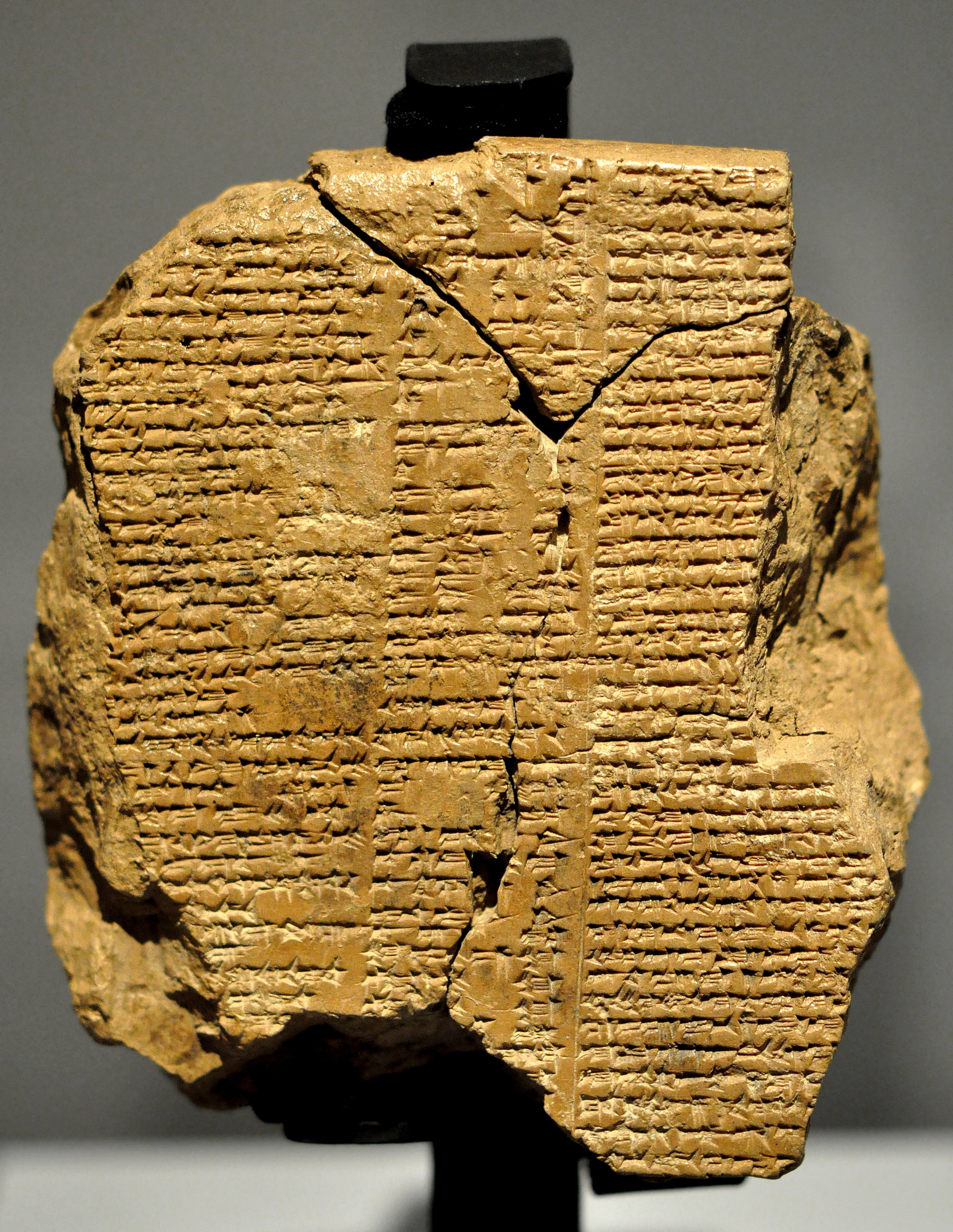
Tablet V of the Epic of Gilgamesh

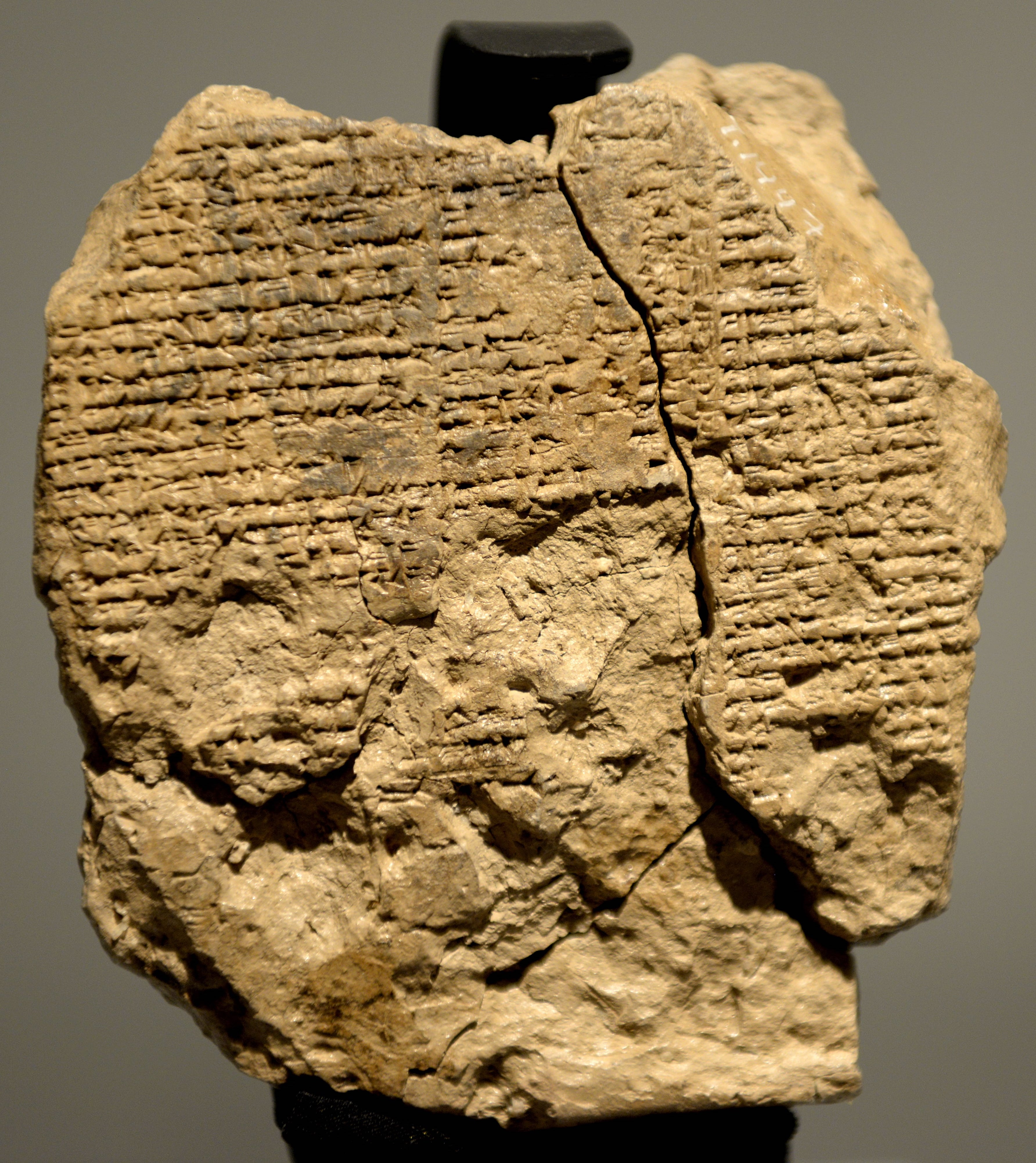
Reverse side of the newly discovered tablet V of the Epic of Gilgamesh. It dates back to the old Babylonian period, 2003–1595 BC, and is currently housed in the Sulaymaniyah Museum, Iraq

The heroes enter the cedar forest. Humbaba, the guardian of the Cedar Forest, insults and threatens them. He accuses Enkidu of betrayal, and vows to disembowel Gilgamesh and feed his flesh to the birds. Gilgamesh is afraid, but with some encouraging words from Enkidu the battle commences. The mountains quake with the tumult and the sky turns black. The god Shamash sends 13 winds to bind Humbaba, and he is captured. Humbaba pleads for his life, and Gilgamesh pities him. He offers to make Gilgamesh king of the forest, to cut the trees for him, and to be his slave. Enkidu, however, argues that Gilgamesh should kill Humbaba to establish his reputation forever. Humbaba curses them both and Gilgamesh dispatches him with a blow to the neck, as well as killing his seven sons. The two heroes cut down many cedars, including a gigantic tree that Enkidu plans to fashion into a door for the temple of Enlil. They build a raft and return home along the Euphrates with the giant tree and (possibly) the head of Humbaba.

===== Tablet six =====
Gilgamesh rejects the advances of the goddess Ishtar because of her mistreatment of previous lovers like Dumuzi. Ishtar becomes angry and denies Gilgamesh entry into E-Ana, interfering with his business. Ishtar asks her father Anu to send Gulaana- the Bull of Heaven to avenge her. When Anu rejects her complaints, Ishtar threatens to raise the dead who will "outnumber the living" and "devour them", as well as screaming loud enough to be heard by the heavens and earth. Anu states that if he gives her the Bull of Heaven, Uruk will face 7 years of famine. Ishtar provides him with provisions for 7 years in exchange for the bull. Ishtar leads the Bull of Heaven to Uruk, and he causes widespread devastation. Drinking continuously without being satisfied, the Bull lowers the level of the Euphrates river, and dries up the marshes. He opens up huge pits that swallow 300 men. Without any divine assistance, Enkidu and Gilgamesh kill him and offer up his heart to Shamash. When Ishtar cries out, Enkidu hurls one of the hindquarters of the bull at her. The city of Uruk celebrates, but Enkidu has an ominous dream about his future failure.

===== Tablet seven =====
In Enkidu's dream, the gods decide that one of the heroes must die because they killed Humbaba and the Bull of Heaven. Despite the protestations of Shamash, Enkidu is marked for death. Enkidu curses the great door he has fashioned for Enlil's temple. He also curses the trapper and Shamhat for removing him from the wild. Shamash reminds Enkidu of how Shamhat fed and clothed him, and introduced him to Gilgamesh. Shamash tells him that Gilgamesh will bestow great honors upon him at his funeral, and will wander into the wild consumed with grief. Enkidu regrets his curses and blesses Shamhat instead. In a second dream, however, he sees himself being taken captive to the Netherworld, a "house of dust" and darkness whose inhabitants eat clay, and are clothed in bird feathers, supervised by terrifying beings. For 12 days, Enkidu's condition worsens. Finally, after a lament that he could not meet a heroic death in battle, he dies. In a famous line from the epic, Gilgamesh clings to Enkidu's body and denies that he has died until a maggot drops from the nose of the corpse.

===== Tablet eight =====
Gilgamesh delivers a lament for Enkidu, in which he calls upon mountains, forests, fields, rivers, wild animals, and all of Uruk to mourn for his friend. Recalling their adventures together, Gilgamesh tears at his hair and clothes in grief. He commissions a funerary statue, and provides grave gifts from his treasury to ensure that Enkidu has a favourable reception in the realm of the dead. A great banquet is held where the treasures are offered to the gods of the Netherworld. Just before a break in the text there is a suggestion that a river is being dammed, indicating a burial in a river bed, as in the corresponding Sumerian poem, The Death of Gilgamesh.

===== Tablet nine =====
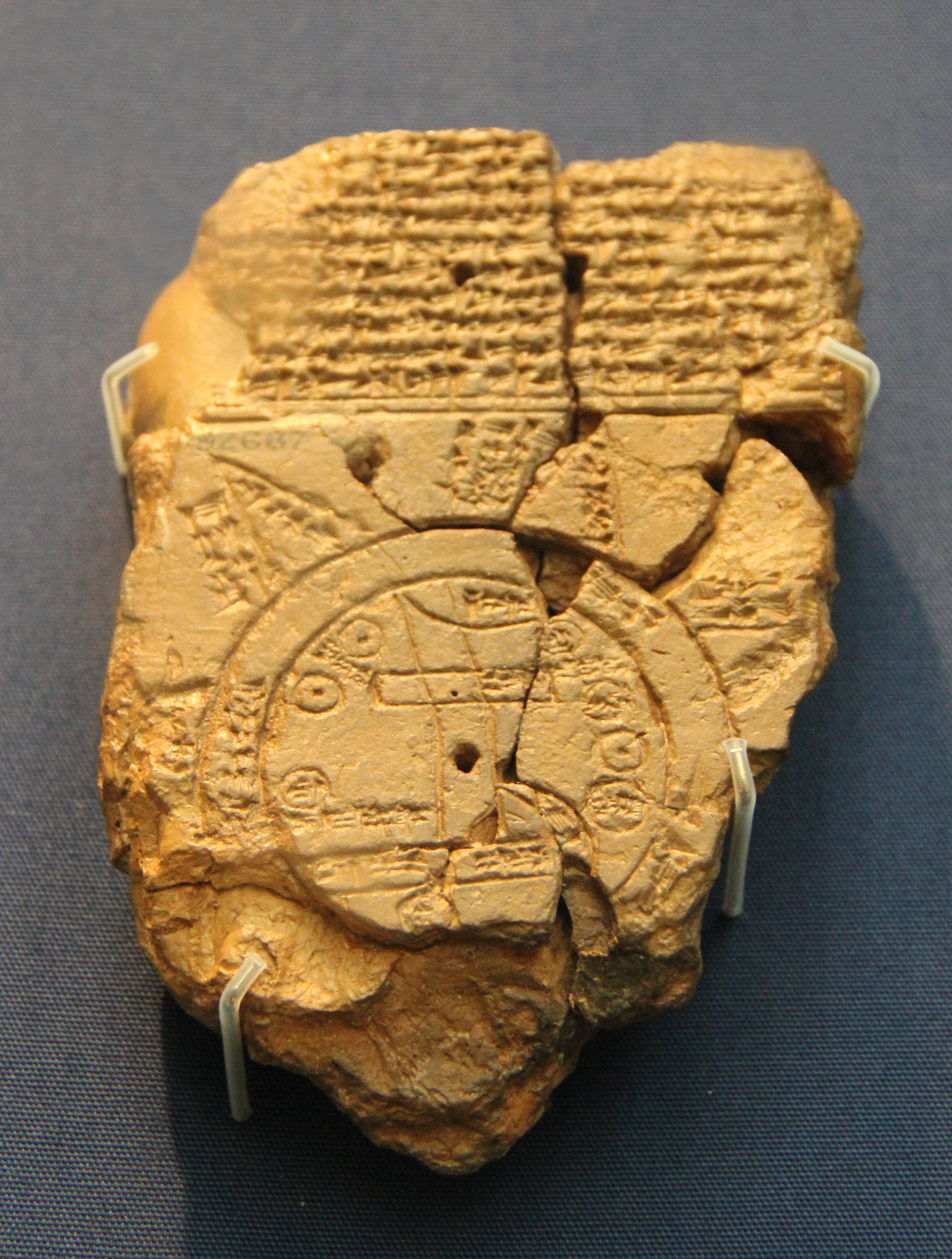
Babylon's world map. The more vertical lines indicate the Euphrates, and the triangles mountains at the world's edge, including the Ararat, on which Utnapishtim Noah stranded. The small circles show city-states such as Uruk, and the belt the goddess salt sea serpent Tiamat. She, the Abzu and the Flood are probably sources of the Leviathan, a human-consuming cosmic sea monster.

Tablet nine opens with Gilgamesh roaming the wild wearing skins, grieving for Enkidu. Having now become fearful of his own death, he decides to seek Utnapishtim ("the Faraway"), and learn the secret of eternal life. Utnapishtim and his wife are the only couple of humans artificially created by the gods who were allowed to survive the great flood and even endowed with divine immortality in gratitude for food sacrifices to the gods, so Utnapishtim seems to be identical to the pious priest Atra-Hasis.

Gilgamesh crosses a mountain pass at night and encounters a pride of lions. Before sleeping he prays for protection to the moon god Sin. Then, waking from an encouraging dream, he kills the lions and uses their skins for clothing. After a long and perilous journey, Gilgamesh arrives at the twin peaks of Mount Mashu at the western end of the earth. He comes across the tunnel of the sun god Shamash, which no man has ever entered, guarded by two scorpion monsters, who appear to be a married couple. The husband tries to dissuade Gilgamesh from passing, but the wife intervenes, expresses sympathy for Gilgamesh, and (according to the poem's editor Benjamin Foster) allows his passage. Entering the tunnel's gate, he follows the path of Shamash in total darkness and actually manages to reach the eastern exit within 12 'double hours', just before he would have been caught up by the sun god, burning him alive. Astonished, he enters the marvellous Garden of the Gods, a paradise in which trees full of delicious jewels grow.

===== Tablet ten =====
Gilgamesh meets alewife Siduri in her pub. First she assumes that he would be a murderer or thief because of his disheveled appearance, but Gilgamesh tells her about the purpose of his journey. She attempts to dissuade him from his quest, but sends him to Urshanabi the ferryman, who will help him cross the sea to Utnapishtim. Gilgamesh, out of spontaneous rage, destroys the stone charms that Urshanabi keeps with him. Gilgamesh tells his story, but when he asks for help, Urshanabi informs him that he has just destroyed the objects that can help them cross the Waters of Death, which are deadly to the touch. Urshanabi instructs Gilgamesh to cut down 120 trees and fashion them into punting poles. When they reach the island where Utnapishtim lives, Gilgamesh recounts his story, asking him for his help. Utnapishtim reprimands him, declaring that fighting the common fate of humans is futile and diminishes life's joys.

===== Tablet eleven =====
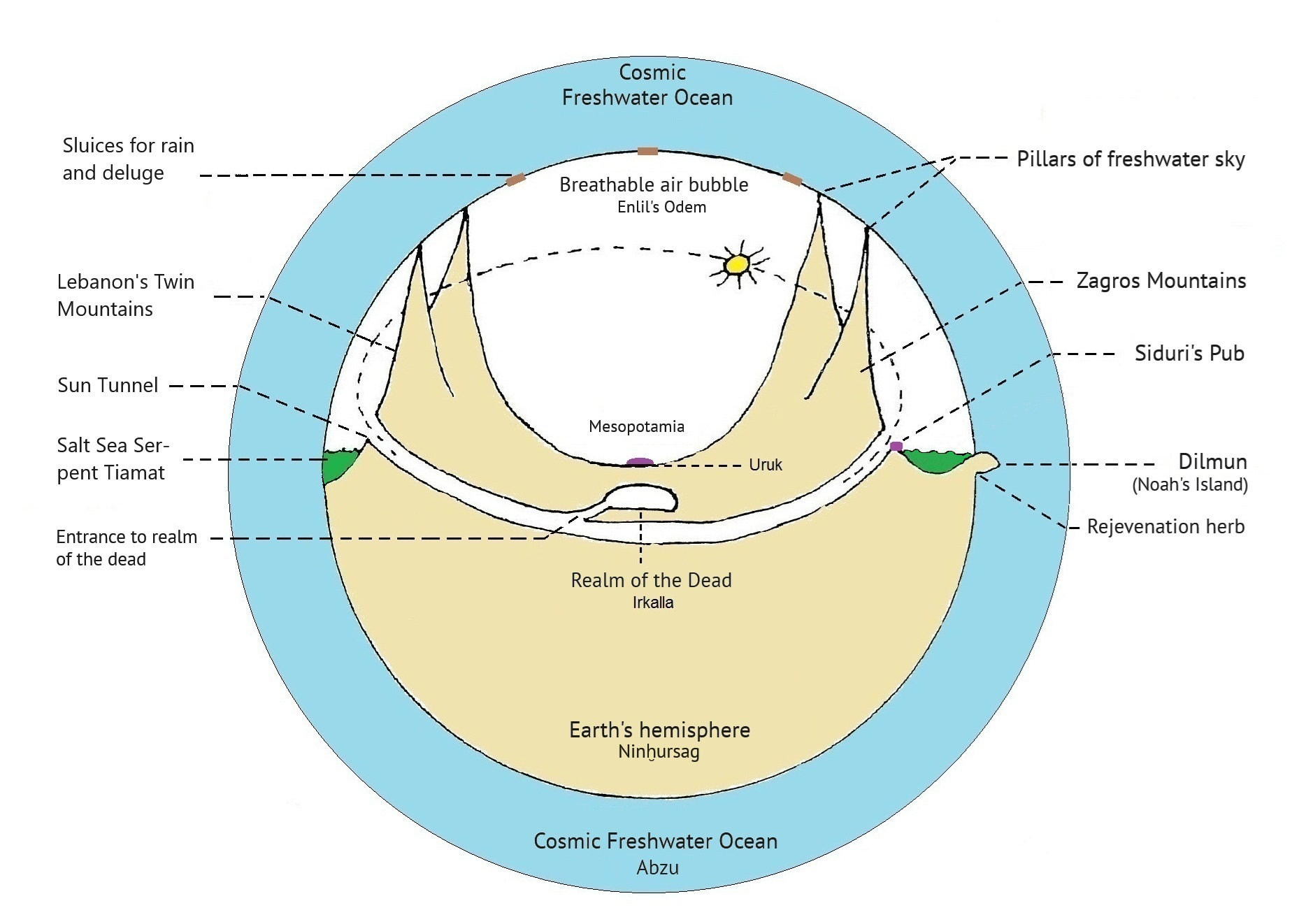
The Sumerian Genesis describes the Abzu as a cosmic freshwater ocean surrounding our planet created in its midst, so the sketch shows the same as Babylon's map, now in sideview. A breathable bubble of air clings to earth's surface; the mountains of Lebanon and Zagros serve as pillars of the freshwater sky; and the tunnel enables the sun god to rush at night from west to east. There, close to sunrise and Siduris pub, lies Dilmun, Utnahpishtim's island, where Gilgamesh dived into the depths, founding the herb of eternal life. The sluice gates set into sky are an important detail: through them, the gods with their skills at building irrigation systems were able to fertilise Mesopotamia with rain, but also to unleash the great flood.

Gilgamesh observes that Utnapishtim seems no different from himself, and asks him how he obtained his immortality. Utnapishtim explains that the gods decided to send a great flood. To save Utnapishtim the god Enki told him to build a boat. He gave him precise dimensions, and it was sealed with pitch and bitumen. His entire family went aboard together with his craftsmen and "all the animals of the field". A violent storm then arose which caused the terrified gods to retreat to the heavens. Ishtar lamented the wholesale destruction of humanity, and the other gods wept beside her. The storm lasted six days and nights, after which "all the human beings turned to clay". Utnapishtim weeps when he sees the destruction. His boat lodges on the Mt. Nimush, and he releases a dove, a swallow, and a raven. When the raven fails to return, he opens the ark and frees its inhabitants. Utnapishtim offers a sacrifice to the gods, who smell the sweet savor and gather around. Ishtar vows that just as she will never forget the brilliant necklace that hangs around her neck, she will always remember this time. When Enlil arrives, angry that there are survivors, she condemns him for instigating the flood. Enki also castigates him for sending a disproportionate punishment. Enlil blesses Utnapishtim and his wife, and rewards them with eternal life. This account largely matches the flood story that concludes the Epic of Atra-Hasis.

The main point seems to be that when Enlil granted eternal life it was a unique gift. As if to demonstrate this point, Utnapishtim challenges Gilgamesh to stay awake for six days and seven nights. Gilgamesh falls asleep, and Utnapishtim instructs his wife to bake a loaf of bread on each of the days he is asleep, so that he cannot deny his failure to keep awake. Gilgamesh, who is seeking to overcome death, cannot even conquer sleep. After instructing Urshanabi, the ferryman, to wash Gilgamesh and clothe him in royal robes, they depart for Uruk. As they are leaving, Utnapishtim's wife asks her husband to offer a parting gift. Utnapishtim tells Gilgamesh that at the bottom of the sea there lives a boxthorn-like plant that will make him young again. Gilgamesh, by binding stones to his feet so he can walk on the bottom, manages to obtain the plant. Gilgamesh proposes to investigate if the plant has the hypothesized rejuvenation ability by testing it on an old man once he returns to Uruk. When Gilgamesh stops to bathe, it is stolen by a serpent, who sheds its skin as it departs. Gilgamesh weeps at the futility of his efforts, because he has now lost all chance of immortality. He returns to Uruk, where the sight of its massive walls prompts him to praise this enduring work to Urshanabi.

===== Tablet twelve =====
This tablet is mainly an Akkadian translation of an earlier Sumerian poem, "Gilgamesh and the Netherworld" (also known as "Gilgamesh, Enkidu, and the Netherworld" and variants), although it has been suggested that it is derived from an unknown version of that story. The contents of this last tablet are inconsistent with previous ones: Enkidu is still alive, despite having died earlier in the epic. Because of this, its lack of integration with the other tablets, and the fact that it is almost a copy of an earlier version, it has been referred to as an 'inorganic appendage' to the epic. Alternatively, it has been suggested that "its purpose, though crudely handled, is to explain to Gilgamesh (and the reader) the various fates of the dead in the Afterlife" and in "an awkward attempt to bring closure", it both connects the Gilgamesh of the epic with the Gilgamesh who is the King of the Netherworld, and is "a dramatic capstone whereby the twelve-tablet epic ends on one and the same theme, that of "seeing" (= understanding, discovery, etc.), with which it began."

Gilgamesh complains to Enkidu that various of his possessions (the tablet is unclear exactly what – different translations include a drum and a ball) have fallen into the underworld. Enkidu offers to bring them back. Delighted, Gilgamesh tells Enkidu what he must and must not do in the underworld if he is to return. Enkidu does everything which he was told not to do. The underworld keeps him. Gilgamesh prays to the gods to give him back his friend. Enlil and Suen do not reply, but Enki and Shamash decide to help. Shamash makes a crack in the earth, and Enkidu's ghost jumps out of it. The tablet ends with Gilgamesh questioning Enkidu about what he has seen in the underworld.

=== Old Babylonian versions ===
This version of the epic, called in some fragments Surpassing all other kings, is composed of tablets and fragments from diverse origins and states of conservation. It remains incomplete in its majority, with several tablets missing, and those found having sizable lacunae. They are named after their current location or the place where they were found.

==== Pennsylvania tablet ====
Surpassing all other kings Tablet II, greatly correlates with tablets I–II of the Standard Babylonian version. Gilgamesh tells his mother Ninsun about two dreams he had. His mother explains that they mean that a new companion will soon arrive at Uruk. In the meanwhile the wild Enkidu and the priestess (here called Shamkatum) have sex. She tames him in company of the shepherds by offering him bread and beer. Enkidu helps the shepherds by guarding the sheep. They travel to Uruk to confront Gilgamesh and stop his abuses. Enkidu and Gilgamesh battle but Gilgamesh breaks off the fight. Enkidu then praises Gilgamesh.

==== Yale tablet ====
Surpassing all other kings Tablet III, partially matches tablets II–III of the Standard Babylonian version. For reasons unknown (the tablet is partially broken) Enkidu is in a sad mood. In order to cheer him up Gilgamesh suggests going to the Pine Forest to cut down trees and kill Humbaba (known here as Huwawa). Enkidu protests, as he knows Huwawa and is aware of his power. Gilgamesh talks Enkidu into it with some words of encouragement, but Enkidu remains reluctant. They prepare, and call for the elders. The elders also protest, but after Gilgamesh talks to them, they agree to let him go. After Gilgamesh asks his god (Shamash) for protection, and both he and Enkidu equip themselves, they leave with the elders' blessing and counsel.

==== Philadelphia fragment ====
Possibly another version of the contents of the Yale Tablet, practically irrecoverable.

==== Nippur school tablet ====
In the journey to the cedar forest and Huwawa, Enkidu interprets one of Gilgamesh's dreams.

==== Tell Harmal tablets ====
Fragments from two different versions/tablets tell how Enkidu interprets one of Gilgamesh's dreams on the way to the Forest of Cedar, and their conversation when entering the forest.

==== Ishchali tablet ====
After defeating Huwawa, Gilgamesh refrains from slaying him, and urges Enkidu to hunt Huwawa's "seven auras". Enkidu convinces him to smite their enemy. After killing Huwawa and the auras, they chop down part of the forest and discover the gods' secret abode. The rest of the tablet is broken.

The auras are not referred to in the Standard Babylonian version, but are in one of the Sumerian poems as "sons".

==== Partial fragment in Baghdad ====
Partially overlapping the felling of the trees from the Ishchali tablet.

==== Sippar tablet ====
Partially overlapping the Standard Babylonian version tablets IX–X. Gilgamesh mourns the death of Enkidu wandering in his quest for immortality. Gilgamesh argues with Shamash about the futility of his quest. After a lacuna, Gilgamesh talks to Siduri about his quest and his journey to meet Utnapishtim (here called Uta-na'ishtim). Siduri attempts to dissuade Gilgamesh in his quest for immortality, urging him to be content with the simple pleasures of life. After one more lacuna, Gilgamesh smashes the "stone ones" and talks to the ferryman Urshanabi (here called Sur-sunabu). After a short discussion, Sur-sunabu asks him to carve 300 oars so that they may cross the waters of death without needing the "stone ones". The rest of the tablet is missing.

The text on the Old Babylonian Meissner fragment (the larger surviving fragment of the Sippar tablet) has been used to reconstruct possible earlier forms of the Epic of Gilgamesh, and it has been suggested that a "prior form of the story – earlier even than that preserved on the Old Babylonian fragment – may well have ended with Siduri sending Gilgamesh back to Uruk..." and "Utnapistim was not originally part of the tale."

=== Sumerian poems ===
There are five extant Gilgamesh stories in the form of older poems in Sumerian. These probably circulated independently, rather than being in the form of a unified epic. Some of the names of the main characters in these poems differ slightly from later Akkadian names; for example, "Bilgames" is written instead of "Gilgamesh", and there are some differences in the underlying stories such as the fact that Enkidu is Gilgamesh's servant in the Sumerian version:

1. Gilgamesh and Huwawa (incipit: The lord went to the Living One's Mountain) and Ho, hurrah! correspond to the Cedar Forest episode (Standard Babylonian version tablets II–V). Gilgamesh and Enkidu travel with other men to the Forest of Cedar. There, trapped by Huwawa, Gilgamesh tricks him (with Enkidu's assistance in one of the versions) into giving up his auras, thus losing his power.
2. Gilgamesh and the Bull of Heaven (incipit: Hero in battle) corresponds to the Bull of Heaven episode (Standard Babylonian version tablet VI) in the Akkadian version. The Bull's voracious appetite causes drought and hardship in the land while Gilgamesh feasts. Lugalgabagal convinces him to face the Bull and attacks him alongside Enkidu.
3. Gilgamesh and Aga (incipit: The envoys of Aga or Akka) has no corresponding episode in the epic, but the themes of whether to show mercy to captives, and counsel from the city elders, also occur in the Standard Babylonian version of the Humbaba story. In the poem, Uruk faces a siege from a Kish army led by King Akka, whom Gilgamesh defeats and forgives.
4. Gilgamesh, Enkidu, and the Netherworld (incipit: In those days, in those far-off days) is the source for the Akkadian translation included as tablet XII in the Standard Babylonian version, telling of Enkidu's journey to the Netherworld. It is also the main source of information for the Eridu Genesis and the story of "Inanna and the Huluppu Tree".
5. Death of Gilgamesh (incipit: The great wild bull is lying down), a poem about Gilgamesh's death, burial and consecration as a semigod, reigning and giving judgement over the dead. After dreaming of how the gods decide his fate after death, Gilgamesh takes counsel, prepares his funeral and offers gifts to the gods. Once deceased, he is buried under the Euphrates, taken off its course and later returned to it.

=== Translations ===
The first direct Arabic translation from the original tablets was published in the 1960s by Iraqi archaeologist Taha Baqir.

Nancy Katharine Sandars, a British archaeologist and prehistorian, published a popular translation of The Epic of Gilgamesh in 1960. An independent scholar, Sandars was never a university academic.

In 1992, David Ferry published Gilgamesh: A New Rendering in English Verse with Farrar, Straus and Giroux.

Andrew George's The Babylonian Gilgamesh Epic: Introduction, Critical Edition and Cuneiform Texts is a definitive modern translation into English. It is a two-volume critical edition published by Oxford University Press in 2003. A book review by Cambridge scholar Eleanor Robson claims that George's is the most significant critical work on Gilgamesh in the last 70 years. George discusses the state of the surviving material, and provides a tablet-by-tablet exegesis, with a dual language side-by-side translation.

In 2004, Stephen Mitchell supplied a translation that includes commentary relating to the Iraq War of 2003. In a review by Mark Jarman, Jarman says that "When he tries to draw parallels between the actions of the heroes, Gilgamesh and Enkidu, and the U.S., the parallels do not make sense."

Derrek Hines published a translation with Penguin Random House in 2004.

Stanley Lombardo published a translation in 2019 with Hackett.

In 2021, a translation by Sophus Helle was published by Yale University Press.

In 2026, Simon Armitage published Gilgamesh: A New Verse Translation with W.W. Norton.

The history of the epic's translation and reception was reviewed by Michael Schmidt in his book Gilgamesh: The Life of a Poem.

== Later influence ==
=== Relationship to the Bible ===
Various themes, plot elements, and characters in the Hebrew Bible have been suggested to correlate with the Epic of Gilgamesh – notably, the accounts of the Garden of Eden, the advice from Ecclesiastes, and the Genesis flood narrative.

==== Garden of Eden ====
The parallels between the stories of Enkidu/Shamhat and Adam/Eve have been long recognized by scholars. In both, a human is created from the soil by a god and lives in nature. He is introduced to a female congener who tempts him. In both stories the man accepts food from the woman, covers his nakedness, and must leave his former home, unable to return. The presence of a snake who steals a plant of immortality from the hero later in the epic is another point of similarity. However, a major difference between the two stories is that while Enkidu experiences regret regarding his seduction away from nature, this is only temporary: After being confronted by the god Shamash for being ungrateful, Enkidu recants and decides to give the woman who seduced him his final blessing before he dies. This is in contrast to Adam, whose fall from grace is largely portrayed as a punishment for disobeying God and the inevitable consequence of the loss of innocence regarding good and evil.

==== Advice from Ecclesiastes ====
Several scholars suggest direct borrowing of Siduri's advice by the author of Ecclesiastes.

A rare proverb about the strength of a triple-stranded rope, "a triple-stranded rope is not easily broken", is common to both books.

==== Noah's flood ====
Andrew George submits that the Genesis flood narrative matches that in Gilgamesh so closely that "few doubt" that it derives from a Mesopotamian account. What is particularly noticeable is the way the Genesis flood story follows the Gilgamesh flood tale "point by point and in the same order", even when the story permits other alternatives. In a 2001 Torah commentary released on behalf of the Conservative Movement of Judaism, rabbinic scholar Robert Wexler stated: "The most likely assumption we can make is that both Genesis and Gilgamesh drew their material from a common tradition about the flood that existed in Mesopotamia. These stories then diverged in the retelling." Ziusudra, Utnapishtim and Noah are the respective heroes of the Sumerian, Akkadian and biblical flood legends of the ancient Near East.

==== Additional biblical parallels ====
Many characters in the Epic have biblical parallels, most notably Ninti, the Sumerian goddess of life, was created from Enki's rib to heal him after he had eaten forbidden flowers. It is suggested that this story served as the basis for the story of Eve created from Adam's rib in the Book of Genesis. Esther J. Hamori, in Echoes of Gilgamesh in the Jacob Story, also claims that the story of Jacob and Esau is paralleled with the wrestling match between Gilgamesh and Enkidu.

==== Book of Giants ====
Gilgamesh is mentioned in one version of The Book of Giants which is related to the Book of Enoch. The Book of Giants version found at Qumran mentions the Sumerian hero Gilgamesh and the monster Humbaba with the Watchers and giants.

=== Influence on Homer ===
Numerous scholars have drawn attention to various themes, episodes, and verses, indicating that the Epic of Gilgamesh had a substantial influence on both of the epic poems ascribed to Homer. According to Tzvi Abusch of Brandeis University, the poem "combines the power and tragedy of the Iliad with the wanderings and marvels of the Odyssey. It is a work of adventure, but is no less a meditation on some fundamental issues of human existence." Martin Litchfield West, in his book The East Face of Helicon: West Asiatic Elements in Greek Poetry, speculates that the memory of Gilgamesh would have reached the Greeks through a lost poem about Heracles.

=== Alexander legends ===
In the Alexander Romance and many subsequent legends of Alexander the Great, Alexander is on a quest to find the Fountain of Life and become immortal. This was inspired by myths of Gilgamesh's quest for eternal youth in the face of his mortality; despite the influence, there are two main differences. The first is that Gilgamesh seeks the plant of youth whereas Alexander seeks the water of life. The second is that the motif of the snake shedding its skin in the Gilgamesh legend is replaced in the Alexander legend by a fish returning to life upon being washed in the fountain. The reasons for these differences was due to the Christianizing force involved in the adaptation of the Gilgamesh legends.

=== In popular culture ===
The Epic of Gilgamesh has inspired many works of literature, art, and music. It was only after World War I that the Gilgamesh epic reached a modern audience, and only after World War II that it was featured in a variety of genres. Hayao Miyazaki's 1997 anime film Princess Mononoke is partially based on the Cedar Forest episode of The Epic of Gilgamesh.

== See also ==
- List of artifacts in biblical archaeology
- List of characters in Epic of Gilgamesh
- Babylonian literature
- Cattle in religion
- Eridu Genesis
- Sumerian literature
