= Yehoshua Mondshine =

Israeli rabbi (1947–2014)

- יהושע מונדשיין
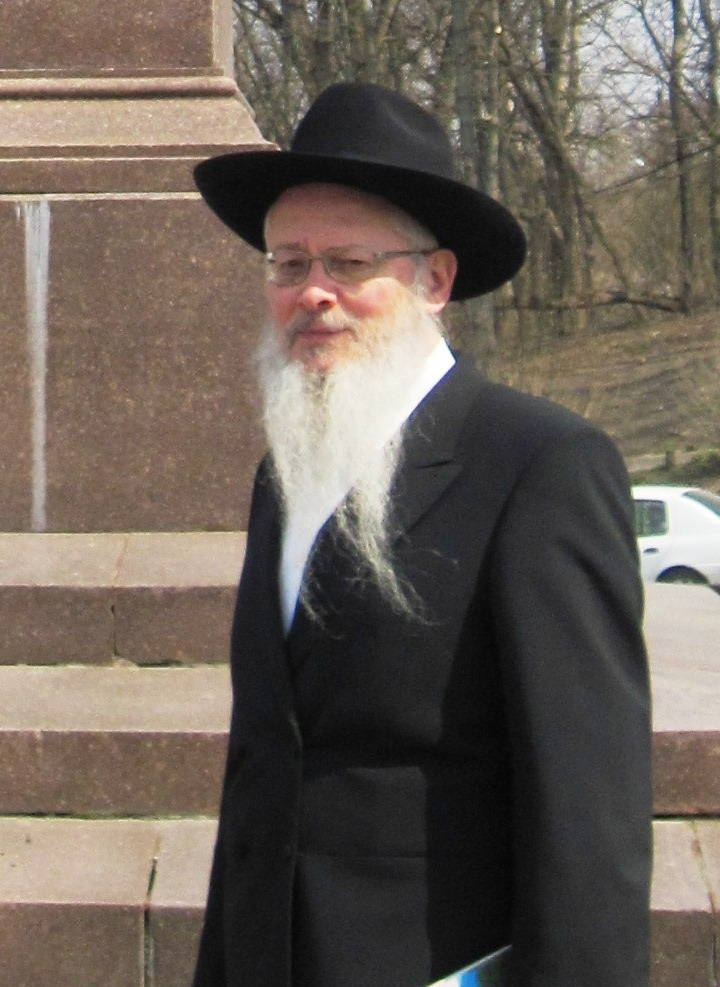
- Born: January 30, 1947; Tel Aviv, Israel
- Died: December 24, 2014 (aged 67)
- Occupation: Rabbi
- Organization: Chabad
- Known for: Bibliography
- Spouse: Rochel Leah Braufman

Yehoshua Mondshine (Hebrew: יהושע מונדשיין; 1947–2014) was an Israeli rabbi, scholar, researcher and historian associated with the Chabad-Lubavitch, Hasidic movement. Mondshine worked as a librarian and bibliographer at the National Library of Israel in Jerusalem.

Rabbi Mondshine authored over twenty works on Chabad Hasidic social and intellectual history, and published a number of articles in various journals, both academic and rabbinic, some of them under the pseudonym Yehoshua D. Levanon.

Mondshine's work on Chabad and general Hasidic historiography continued a tradition in Chabad from the nineteenth century where the Chabad movement published material in the spirit of critical academic historiography.

== Personal life ==
Yoshua Mondshine was born on January 30, 1947 (or 9 Shevat, 5707, in the Hebrew calendar), in the city of Tel Aviv, Israel.

Mondshine studied at Yeshivas Hayishuv Hachadash in Tel Aviv and later at Central Tomchei Tmimim Yeshiva in Kfar Chabad where he studied under the Mashpia Rabbi Shlomo Chaim Kesselman. In 1968, Mondshine studied at the Central Lubavitch Yeshiva in Crown Heights, Brooklyn. As a student in Crown Heights, Mondshine worked as a lead editor assisting Rabbi Yehoshua Korf publish a new commentary to the Tanya, the classical work of Chabad philosophy.

In 1968, Mondshine married Rochel Leah Braufman (Braverman), daughter of Rabbi Dovid Braverman who headed the Kehot publishing group in Europe and the Kfar Chabad Council, and had five children. After the death of his wife Rochel in 2006, Mondshine married Devorah Kwin-Althaus. Mondshine's son Rabbi Dovid Mondshine is the director of the Ohr Avner Foundation.

=== Correspondence with the Lubavitcher Rebbe ===
In around 1960, Mondshine began corresponding with the Lubavitcher Rebbe, Rabbi Menachem Mendel Schneerson, when he requested and received a blessing ahead of his Bar Mitzvah. Mondshine continued to write to the Rebbe, confiding his teenage anxieties and seeking spiritual advice; Mondshine, in one early letter, included a list of textual variants he had noticed in the Chabad prayerbook compared to earlier sources. The Rebbe referred him to a number of sources where he could explore the issues and discover an answer for himself.

== Career ==
Though he received an offer from the Lubavitcher Rebbe, Rabbi Menachem Mendel Schneerson, to run the Chabad Library, Mondshine instead took the position as a librarian at the National Library of Israel at the Hebrew University of Jerusalem.

Mondshine edited a number of books on the topic of Chabad history, referencing original manuscripts that he discovered, compiling evidence to differentiate between authoritative traditions and legends.

As a Chabad Hasid and historian and scholar, Mondshine won the respect both of academic scholars and of members of the Chabad community. Mondshine was responsible for publishing, editing, and producing a number of scholarly articles, bibliographies, and polemical essays; his work was especially well received by the Lubavitcher Rebbe who encouraged his literary work. Israeli historian Tom Segev called Mondshine "Chabad's critic from within" for his articles that critically examined various popular Hasidic tales.

=== Research on the origins on Hasidic-Mitnagdic controversy ===
Mondshine has argued against other Jewish historians, such as Simon Dubnow, Mordechai Vilensky and Immanuel Etkes, that Rabbi Elijah of Vilna (the Vilna Goan) was not the driving force behind the early persecution of Hasidim, and had only become involved due to the activism of leaders of the Kahal (the autonomous administrative body) of the Jewish community of Vilna. The Kahal leaders viewed Hasidism as a movement that threatened the social order and their economic and social standing; the leaders presented the Vilna Gaon with false evidence, thus inciting him to lash out at the Hasidim. Mondshine uses Russian archival documents to back his theory of the events. Along these lines, Mondshein also collected statements from Rabbi Shneur Zalman’s responsa that indicate the preoccupations with the conflict that interfered with his writing responsa.

Immanuel Etkes in turn cites Mondshine's identification with Chabad Hasidism as limiting the critical viewpoint necessary for such research.

=== Commissioned work for the Lubavitcher Rebbe ===
In the 1970s, the Lubavitcher Rebbe requested Mondshine to compose an introduction and indexes to the surviving writings of Rabbi Levi Yitzchak Schneerson, the Rebbe’s father.

=== Manuscript of Shivkhei Ha-Baal Shem Tov ===
In 1982, Mondshine published an early and previously unknown manuscript of Shivkhei Ha-Baal Shem Tov (Praises of the Baal Shem Tov), an early collection of tales about the founder of the Hasidic movement. Mondshine added an extended introduction and appendices, examining the manuscript in relation to the various published versions of the text and assessed the treatment and perpetuation of early Hasidic tales in later generations of the Hasidic movement.

== Works ==
Mondshine authored over twenty books including:

- Hama’asar Harishon (The First Imprisonment) – a historical work on the imprisonment of the first Chabad rebbe, Rabbi Shneur Zalman of Liadi, published by Knizhniki Publishing, Moscow;
- Ha’masa Ha’aharon (The Final Journey) – a historical work on the journey of the Rabbi Shneur Zalman during the Napolenonic War with Russia, published by Knizhniki Publishing;
- Kerem Chabad (The Chabad Vineyard) – a scholarly journal on Chabad and Hasidic topics;
- Migdal Oz – a memorial volume incorporating many previously unpublished Hasidic texts with sections devoted to Jewish law, Chabad philosophy, Hasidic tales and memoirs, published in 1980;
- Otsar Minhagei Chabad (A Treasury of Chabad Customs) – a two volume work on Chabad customs;
- Sipurim U'gilgulaihem – a series of over seventy articles published online combining scholarship and wit to challenge conventional thinking concerning popular Hasidic tales.

Other works include studies on various aspects of Hasidic Judaism:

- Mondshine, Y. (1982). “Al ha-Tikkun ha-Kelali shel Reb Naḥman mi-Breslav ve-Yaḥaso le-Shabta’ut,” Zion, 47(1), 201-45.

=== Commemorative works ===
Following Mondshine's death, Chabad scholar, Elie Matusof, published a short book of letters titled Tzidkoscha Omedes Lo'ad (Hebrew: צדקתו עומדת לעד) from Mondshine's correspondence with him in 1987.

== See also ==
- Naftali Loewenthal
- Chabad philosophy
