= Naftali Loewenthal =

Naftali Loewenthal (Hebrew: נפתלי לוונטל) (b. 1944) is a Jewish academic from England, and a member of the Chabad Hasidic community. Loewenthal's main area of study is Hasidism and Jewish Mysticism, he serves as a professor in the Department of Hebrew and Jewish Studies at University College London, and the director of the Chabad Research Unit, a division of the Chabad-Lubavitch movement in the United Kingdom. Loewenthal is noted as the author of Communicating the Infinite: The Emergence of the Habad School (1990), an important work on the scholarship of Hasidism; he has also authored Hasidism Beyond Modernity: Essays in Habad Thought and History (2019) as well as many scholarly articles and publications on the Chabad mysticism.

One key area of Loewenthal's research has been the topic of the history of Chabad Hasidic women.

== Selected publications ==
=== Books ===
- Loewenthal, N. (1990). Communicating the infinite: The emergence of the Habad school. University of Chicago Press.
- Loewenthal, N. (2020). Hasidism beyond modernity: Essays in Habad thought and history. The Littman Library of Jewish Civilization.

=== Other publications ===
- Loewenthal, N. (1987). The Apotheosis of Action in Early Habad. Da’at, 18, 104-130.
- Loewenthal, N. (1994). Hasidism, Mysticism and Reality. Jewish Quarterly, 41(1), 52-53.
- Loewenthal, N. (1998). Contemporary Habad and the paradox of redemption, in Ivry, A. L., et al. (eds) Perspectives on Jewish thought and mysticism. Amsterdam: Harwood Academic Publishers (pp. 381–402).
- Loewenthal, N. (1999). Women and the dialectic of spirituality in Hasidism. In Immanuel Etkes, David Assaf, Israel Bartal, Elchanan Reiner (Eds.) Within Hasidic Circles: Studies in Hasidism in Memory of Mordecai Wilensky (pp. 7–65). Jerusalem: The Bialik Institute.
- Loewenthal, N. (2000). 'Daughter/wife of Hasid' or 'Hasidic woman'? Jewish Studies, 40, 21-28.
- Loewenthal, N. (2005). Spirituality experience for Hasidic youths and girls in pre-Holocaust Europe-a confluence of tradition and modernity. In Adam Mintz, Lawrence Schiffman (Eds.) Jewish Spirituality and Divine Law (pp. 407–454). KTAV Publishing House.
- Loewenthal, N. (2013). From ladies auxiliary to shluhot network: Women's activism in twentieth-century Habad. In Israel Bartal et al. (Eds.) A Touch of Grace: Studies in Ashkenazi Culture, Women's History, and the Languages of the Jews (pp. 69–93). Zalman Shazar Center.
- Loewenthal N. (2013). "Midrash in Habad Hasidism" in Fishbane M. and J. Weinberg (Eds) Midrash Unbound: Transformations and Innovations, Liverpool University Press (pp. 429–455).

== See also ==
- Yehoshua Mondshine
- Ada Rapoport-Albert
- Bonnie Morris
