= Siduri =

Character in the Epic of Gilgamesh and epithet of deities

Siduri, or more accurately Šiduri (pronounced Shiduri), is a character in the Epic of Gilgamesh. She is described as an alewife. The oldest preserved version of the composition to contain the episode involving her leaves her nameless, and in the later standard edition compiled by Sîn-lēqi-unninni her name only appears in a single line. She is named Naḫmazulel or Naḫmizulen in the preserved fragments of Hurrian and Hittite translations. It has been proposed that her name in the standard edition is derived from an epithet applied to her by the Hurrian translator, šiduri, "young woman." An alternate proposal instead connects it with the Akkadian personal name Šī-dūrī, "she is my protection." In all versions of the myth in which she appears, she offers advice to the hero, but the exact contents of the passage vary. Possible existence of Biblical and Greek reflections of the Šiduri passage is a subject of scholarly debate.

In other contexts, the epithet šiduri could refer to various goddesses, including Hurrian Allani, Ishara and Allanzu, as well as Mesopotamian Ishtar. However, equating Ishtar with the alewife from the Epic of Gilgamesh is regarded as incorrect.

== Name ==
The name Šiduri (^{d}SI-du-ri) is often transcribed as Siduri, but based on alternate orthographies from outside the Epic of Gilgamesh Andrew R. George concludes that the spelling Šiduri (read Shiduri) is more accurate. The alewife is nameless in the preserved Old Babylonian fragments of the Epic of Gilgamesh, and even in the standard edition only a single line directly refers to her as Šiduri. Her name is preceded by the dingir sign, so-called "divine determinative," and it is assumed that she should be understood as a deity.

The etymology of the name is a matter of debate, with two theories being presently regarded as plausible. According to Wilfred G. Lambert, it is likely derived from the ordinary Akkadian personal name Šī-dūrī, known from the Ur III period, which he interpreted as "she is my wall (metaphorically: protection),: but a second proposal, already acknowledged as a possibility by Lambert, connects it with the Hurrian word šiduri, "young woman." A Mesopotamian lexical text lists the term šiduri as a synonym of Akkadian ardatu, likewise referring to a young woman. Andrew R. George considers it possible that the Akkadian personal name was a Hurrian loanword provided with an Akkadian folk etymology.

Gary Beckman notes that in Hurrian and Hittite translations of the epic known from fragments from Hattusa, the alewife bears an ordinary Hurrian given name, Naḫmazulel or Naḫmizulen, but she is referred to as šiduri. He proposes that this term, functioning in this context as an epithet, was later reinterpreted as a given name in the standard Babylonian version. Naḫmazulel's name is written with the dingir sign too.

=== The epithet šiduri in other sources ===
In Hurrian sources, the epithet šiduri was applied to various goddesses, including Allanzu (a daughter of Hebat), Allani and Ishara.

Šiduri is also attested as an epithet of Ishtar in three Mesopotamian sources, Hymn to the Queen of Nippur, the god list An = Anum (tablet IV, line 4) and the incantation series Šurpu. According to Wilfred G. Lambert, it most likely only started to be applied to this goddess as an epithet in the Middle Babylonian period, and originally designated a distinct figure. He concluded Šiduri as described in the Epic of Gilgamesh cannot be Ishtar. Šurpu refers to Šiduri as a goddess of wisdom, which, according to Andrew R. George, might indicate a connection with the Epic of Gilgamesh.

The form of Ishtar referred to as Šiduri was Šarrat-Nippuri (Akkadian: "Queen of Nippur," Sumerian form Ungal-Nibru is also attested) worshiped in the E-baradurgarra temple in Nippur. She is first attested in sources from the Kassite period. Šarrat-Nippuri should not be confused with Nin-Nibru (Sumerian: "lady of Nippur," Bēlet-Nippuri in Akkadian), a title of the spouse of Ninurta, which could be applied to Gula or Ninimma.

== Epic of Gilgamesh ==
An unnamed alewife who corresponds to Šiduri appears already in an Old Babylonian version of the Epic of Gilgamesh which likely originated in Sippar. When she meets Gilgamesh, who mourns after the death of Enkidu, she suggests that instead of pursuing immortality, he should accept that death is the ultimate fate of mankind and instead enjoy his life on earth and start a family. He does not react to this advice, but rather asks her to direct him to Utnapishtim. Bendt Alster interpreted the alewife's advice as the first recorded occurrence of the carpe diem theme. Andrew R. George notes that it has been interpreted as a display of hedonistic philosophy, but he disagrees with this assumption and argues that the passage simply states that a man should be content with the position allotted to him in life. Susan Ackerman argues the alewife urges Gilgamesh to abandon his mourning, "reversing the liminal rituals of mourning and returning to the normal and normative behaviors of Mesopotamian society."

At least one scene recorded on the same tablet, in which the sun god Shamash warns Gilgamesh about the futility of his quest for immortality, has no parallel in later versions, but his advice closely parallels that later given by the alewife.

The so-called "Standard Babylonian" version of the Epic of Gilgamesh introduces Šiduri in the first line of tablet X. It is possible that she can also be identified with a nameless person who is described watching Gilgamesh from afar in the final lines of tablet IX. She lives in a tavern close to the edge of the ocean. She hides her face behind a veil, which would be unusual for a Babylonian alewife, and most likely is supposed to make her appear more mysterious to the readers. She initially mistakes Gilgamesh for a potentially troublesome big game hunter, barricades the door and hides on the roof. The hero at first threatens to strike the door, but after Šiduri inquires about his whereabouts he introduces himself, describes his various deeds, such as defeating Humbaba and the Bull of Heaven, and in response to her question about his state explains that he is in poor condition because of his grief caused by Enkidu's death, and implores her to tell him how to reach Utnapishtim. The alewife explains the road is difficult and leads both through the ocean and more distant "Waters of Death," and suggests Gilgamesh should seek the help of Urshanabi, Utnapishtim's boatman, whose boat takes him to his destination. However, advice unrelated to the journey itself which she offers in the older version is absent.

Andrew R. George suggests that the change in advice given by the alewife was one of the innovations introduced by Sîn-lēqi-unninni, a scribe who according to a neo-Assyrian catalog of cuneiform texts and their authors was believed to be responsible for preparing the standard edition of the Epic of Gilgamesh. An even later source anachronistically considers him a contemporary of Gilgamesh, but in reality he was most likely active in the Kassite period.

Tzvi Abusch's proposal that a third, not preserved, version of the scene involved Šiduri proposing marriage to Gilgamesh is not substantiated.

== Possible later influence ==
There is a long scholarly tradition of arguing that the older version of the Šiduri passage inspired the advice for a good life known from Ecclesiastes (9: 7-9). This theory was originally formed by Bruno Meissner in 1902. It is still supported by some researchers today, for example Nili Samet. However, a direct connection between these two texts is not universally accepted in Biblical studies or in Assyriology, and Samet acknowledges it has been often argued that both passages simply reflect "a common theme in world literature." Andrew R. George notes that the content of both passages is similar, but finds a direct connection unlikely, as the alewife only offers Gilgamesh advice in Old Babylonian fragments, but not in the later versions of the epic.

The Classicist Martin Litchfield West suggested that the encounter between Gilgamesh and the alewife in the Old Babylonian version inspired the meeting between Circe and Odysseus in the Odyssey. He incorrectly referred to Šiduri as portrayed in the Epic of Gilgamesh as a "form of Ishtar" to try to reconcile the differences between her and Circe, especially the association with wild animals exhibited only by the former. Andrew R. George disagrees with West's proposals regarding direct connections between the myths of Gilgamesh and the Odyssey and considers it implausible that Greek authors were familiar with the standard Babylonian edition of the latter. He notes it is more likely that Greeks were influenced by a western, Phoenician literary tradition, which unlike Mesopotamian cuneiform texts does not survive, making it impossible to evaluate if among the stories passed on to Greeks this way were any versions of the Epic of Gilgamesh. He also points out that in some cases similarities between these texts might be the result of reliance on similar mythologems rather than direct influence of one on the other. George's position regarding the connections between Greek and Mesopotamian literature is also supported by Gary Beckman.
