= Sîn-lēqi-unninni =

Babylonian scribe

Sîn-lēqi-unninni (Akkadian: 𒁹𒀭𒌍𒋾𒀀𒅆 ^{md}30-TI-ER_{2}) was a mašmaššu who lived in Mesopotamia, probably in the period between 1300 BC and 1000 BC. He is traditionally thought to have compiled the best-preserved version of the Epic of Gilgamesh. His name is listed in the text itself, which was unorthodox for works written in cuneiform. His version is known by its incipit, or first line "ša nagba īmuru" ("He who saw the deep" or "The one who saw the Abyss"). The extent to which his version is different from earlier texts is unknown; Andrew R. George argues that Sîn-lēqi-unninni "gave [The Epic of Gilgamesh] its final, fixed form". Tigay acknowledges that Sîn-lēqi-unninni shifted "Gilgamesh's greatness from deeds to the acquisition of knowledge". At time it was also known as "Gilgamesh series" (iškar Gilgāmeš).

The prologue features the only instance of first person narration by Sîn-lēqi-unninni. (Note: The prologue traditionally attributed to Sîn-lēqi-unninni was found in an earlier manuscript from Ugarit.) His version includes Utnapishtim's story of the Flood in tablet XI and, in tablet XII, the Sumerian Gilgamesh, Enkidu, and the Netherworld.

Sîn-lēqi-unninni's name means 'Sîn (the Moon God) is one who accepts my prayer'. It is also sometimes transcribed, albeit less probably, as 'Sîn-liqe-unninni', meaning 'O Sîn! Accept my prayer'. Several Úruk families in the Neo-Babylonian, Achaemenid and Seleucid periods claimed Sîn-lēqi-unninni as their ancestor, specifically those who acted as scribes and kalû, creating something of a "dynasty of intellectuals". Sîn-lēqi-unninni may have been a legendary figure, with a list from the first millennium B.C. describing him as "Gilgamesh's wise councilor".

== Bibliography ==
- Sin-léqi-unnínni, ed. (2020) [2017]. Ele que o abismo viu (in Brazilian Portuguese). Translated by Jacyntho Lins Brandão (1 ed.). Autêntica. p. 320. ISBN 978-85-513-0283-5.
