= Gilgamesh, Enkidu, and the Netherworld =

Extant Sumerian language work

Gilgamesh, Enkidu, and the Netherworld (abbreviated as GEN) is one of five extant compositions of the Sumerian language about the deeds of the hero Gilgamesh. It was known to the ancients by its incipit, ud ri-a ud sud-rá ri-a or "In those days, in those faraway days". It spans 330 lines.

Apart from the first few lines of the prologue containing common cosmological sayings, GEN is a unique text from the corpus of Sumerian and Akkadian literature with few serious parallels known from other works.

== Structure ==
Historians typically subdivide GEN into three substories:

1. A mythological and cosmological prologue (lines 1–26)
2. The pukku and the mekkû episodes where Enkidu reports the idea of descending into the underworld to Gilgamesh (147–171)
3. Enkidu descends to retrieve the pukku and the mekkû (172–end)

These three episodes are not entirely chronologically coherent adjacent to one another, and they appear to have originally circulated as independent tales which coalesced at some point into GEN.

== Synopsis ==
The following is a detailed synopsis of the story:

- Origins of human civilization and how the world is divided among the gods (lines 4–13)
- Enki journeys to the netherworld by boat (14–26)
- A disturbance causes the ḫalub-tree to be uprooted; a disguised Inanna rescues it and plants it in her garden in Uruk hoping for it to grow so that one day she can make a chair and a bed from it (27–39)
- Inanna discovers the dismal condition of the tree due to issues caused by the Anzu bird, a succubus, and a snake (40–43)
- Inanna pleads the aid of Utu, the sun god, but he refuses (44–90)
- Inanna pleads the aid of Gilgamesh, the king of Uruk, who agrees: he addresses each of the three objects plaguing the tree. He then fells the tree and uses it to make a chair and bed for Inanna. For himself, he creates a ball and a stick (the pukku and the mekkû) (91–150)
- Gilgamesh begins to use the three objects for a game that involves oppressing his people at Uruk; they appeal to Utu for help (150–164)
- In answer to the pleas, Gilgamesh's ball and stick are cast into the Netherworld (164–167)
- Enkidu, the champion of Gilgamesh, volunteers to retrieve the three objects; Gilgamesh agrees and instructs him on proper etiquette in the underworld so as to not be recognized as an intruder (168–205)
- When he is in the underworld, he fails to properly observe Gilgamesh's advice — the Underworld recognizes and traps him (206–221)
- Gilgamesh appeals Enlil to save Enkidu, but his appeal is ignored (222–230)
- Enki enters and requests that Utu open a passage that will allow Enkidu to return (231–243)
- The final part is a dialogue between Enkidu and Gilgamesh where Gilgamesh learns from Enkidu about the conditions of the underworld (244–end)

== Prologue ==
GENs prologue consists of a cosmogony and an anthropogeny in the first half, and a trip taken by Enki into the Netherworld in the second half. This prologue may have also opened a larger, earlier Gilgamesh epic that GEN was once a component of, as is partially evinced by its consisting of a cosmogony. Some researchers believe that the purpose of the cosmogonical prologue differs from those seen in the Mesopotamian disputations insofar as their function is to provide a broader cosmic discourse, whereas the disputations seek to use them to introduce the protagonists. Others think, however, that no Sumerian prologue, that of GEN included, is meant to provide a cosmogony in the sense attempted by a text like the Enuma elish. Instead, for scholars like Gadotti, it also serves as an introductory aide to what follows in the text.

The first half of the prologue has been used in a number of studies to help reconstruct ancient Sumerian cosmogony. One prominent cosmological feature mentioned in the prologue is the separation of heaven and earth. It also introduces the three main components of its cosmos: Heaven (domain of An), Earth (domain of Enlil), and the Netherworld (domain of Ereshkigal). It appears that Ereshkigal receives the Netherworld from An and Enlil as a dowry. Horowitz believes that the text may still preserve the fourth major feature of the cosmos in Mesopotamian cosmology, namely the Sea/Ocean.

The second half of the prologue describes Enki taking a trip to the Netherworld by way of boat. The reason and outcome of the journey is not clear; it seems to either have been so well-known that it did not need to be stated or it was sufficiently unimportant to the text that it was not elaborated. Other Mesopotamian stories may also record journeys without explaining the reason why they were undertaken. It is possible that Enki's journey merely means to foreshadow that of Enkidu's later in the text. It could also be used as a device to demonstrate the ability for someone to travel to the Netherworld at the outset and foreshadow Enki's later role in helping Enkidu escape when he becomes stuck in that region. That even Enki encounters troubles in his journey may be used to point to the difficulties encountered by Enkidu when he becomes stuck. A number of Mesopotamian texts record belief in rivers that route to the Netherworld (similar to the Styx from Greek cosmology), and this likely forms the context to understand why such a journey could take Enki there.

== Fates of the Dead in the Underworld ==
First it sorts people based on how many children (sons) they had that could offer libations and food sacrifices for them, since otherwise the dead in the underworld could only eat mud and clay. Next come people who could not be given a full body burial, people whose death came too soon. And finally those that burned to death, and whose souls can not find rest. Here are some examples:

„‘Did you see the man with one son?’ “I saw him, ‘How does he fare?' ‘For the peg set in his wall bitterly he laments.’(...)

"Did you see the man with seven sons?’ ‘I saw him, ‘How does he fare?’ "Among the junior deities he sits on a throne and listens to the proceedings.’ 'Did you see the man with no heir?' 'I saw him.' '[How does] he fare?" 'He eats a bread-loaf like a kiln-fired brick.' (...) Did you see the woman who had not given birth?" 'I saw her.' 'How does she fare?' 'Like a defective pot she is cast aside, no man takes pleasure in her.’“ (...) „'Did you see the leper?' 'I saw him.' 'How does he fare?' 'His food is set apart, his drink is set apart, he eats uprooted grass, he roots for water (in the ground), he lives outside the city. (...) 'Did you see the man eaten by a lion?' 'I saw him.' ‘How does he fare? 'Bitterly he cries, "O my hand! O my foot!"" 'Did you see the person who fell from a roof?' 'I saw him 'How does he fare?’ "They cannot repair his bones. He twitches like an ox as the maggots consume him.' ‘ Did you see the man whom the Storm God [drowned) in a flood?' 'I saw him.’ 'How does he fare?' 'He twitches like an ox as the maggots consume him.’“ (...) „'Did you see the little stillborn babies, who knew not names of their own?" "I saw them.' 'How do they fare?" 'They play amid syrup and ghee at tables of silver and gold.' 'Did you see the man who died [a premature] death?' 'I saw him.’ 'How does he fare?' 'He lies on the bed of the gods.' 'Did you see the man who was burnt to death?' 'I did not see him. His ghost was not there, his smoke went up to the heavens.'“

– The Babylonian Gilgamesh Epic Introduction, Critical Edition and Cuneiform Texts George, Andrew R. 2003

== Emergence ==
Some believe that GEN goes back to an earlier and larger Sumerian Gilgamesh cycle, which included both it and three other known Sumerian Gilgamesh epics: GEN opened the cycle, the Death of Gilgamesh closed it, and two others (Gilgamesh and Huwawa; Gilgamesh and the Bull of Heaven) were between these two, although which one of the two was placed before the other is unclear.

The prologue of GEN is attested in variations from a number of other sources, ranging from the Early Dynastic Period (first half of the 3rd millennium BC) at the earliest to Sumerian literature from the early 2nd millennium BC. Afterwards, it is borrowed into Akkadian literature.

== Manuscripts ==
The work is known from 74 manuscripts in multiple sites. The most common location for manuscripts is Nippur, where 55 have been found, commonly produced in the scribal curricula at the site. Second most commonly, 17 manuscripts come from Ur. Two manuscripts are known from Tell Haddad, and single manuscripts have been found at Isin, Sippar, and Uruk.

== Discovery, publication, scholarship ==
The first fragments of GEN were published in 1909 by H. Radau, although it was not until 1913 when H. Zimmern demonstrated that these fragments attested to a Sumerian epic of Gilgamesh. The text was studied in detail for the first time in 1932 by S. Langdon, who had, in 1931, excavated more fragments belonging to the story from Kish. The first critical edition of the text came from Samuel Noah Kramer in 1938. The work was then the subject of A. Shaffer's doctoral dissertation, which was published in 1963. This included a critical edition of the complete text, alongside a general introduction, a transliteration and apparatus, a translation and commentary. More fragments continued to be published over the years, such as by C. Wilcke. Literary features of the text were studied by J. Tigay (1982), B. Alster (1983), and A. Koefoed (1983). From the 1990s onwards, GEN has been the focus of increasing scholarly interest and works.

== Editions and translations ==
Some of the following volumes are dedicated translations of GEN, whereas others contain translations of multiple Gilgamesh-related stories, GEN being among them.

=== English ===
- Gadotti, Alhena. Gilgamesh, Enkidu, and the Netherworld and the Sumerian Gilgamesh Cycle, De Gruyter, 2014.
- George, Andrew. The Babylonian Gilgamesh Epic. Introduction, Critical Edition and Cuneiform Texts, 2 vols. Oxford.
- Kovacs, M. G. The Epic of Gilgamesh, 1989.

=== Italian ===
- Pettinato, G. La saga di Gilgamesh. Milano. 1992.

=== French ===
- Tournay, R./A. Shaffer (1994): L’épopée de Gilgamesh. Paris
