= Joseph G. Weiss =

Scholar of Jewish mysticism and Hasidism

Joseph G. Weiss (August 10, 1918 – August 25, 1969) was a scholar of Jewish Mysticism and Hasidism. He was born in Budapest to a Neolog family, and studied both in university and at the Jewish Theological Seminary (now the Budapest University of Jewish Studies) and after emigrating to Mandatory Palestine, studied at the Hebrew University of Jerusalem under the tutelage of Prof. Gershom Scholem from 1941 till 1950, when Weiss moved to England. In England Weiss first taught children aged 5–11 at a Jewish School in Leeds, before spending time in London, Manchester and Oxford, where he occupied various research and teaching positions, eventually becoming the director of the Institute of Jewish Studies at University College London.

Weiss's work, which showed great originality, focused primarily upon the early stages of the Hasidic movement with a special emphasis upon Rabbi Nachman of Breslov. His work, three volumes of which were published posthumously, utilizes a combination of both intellectual and social history. His closest student was Professor Ada Rapoport-Albert, who continued his work at University College London. His son was the poet and translator Amos Weisz.
