= Alewife (trade) =

Historical term for female ale trader

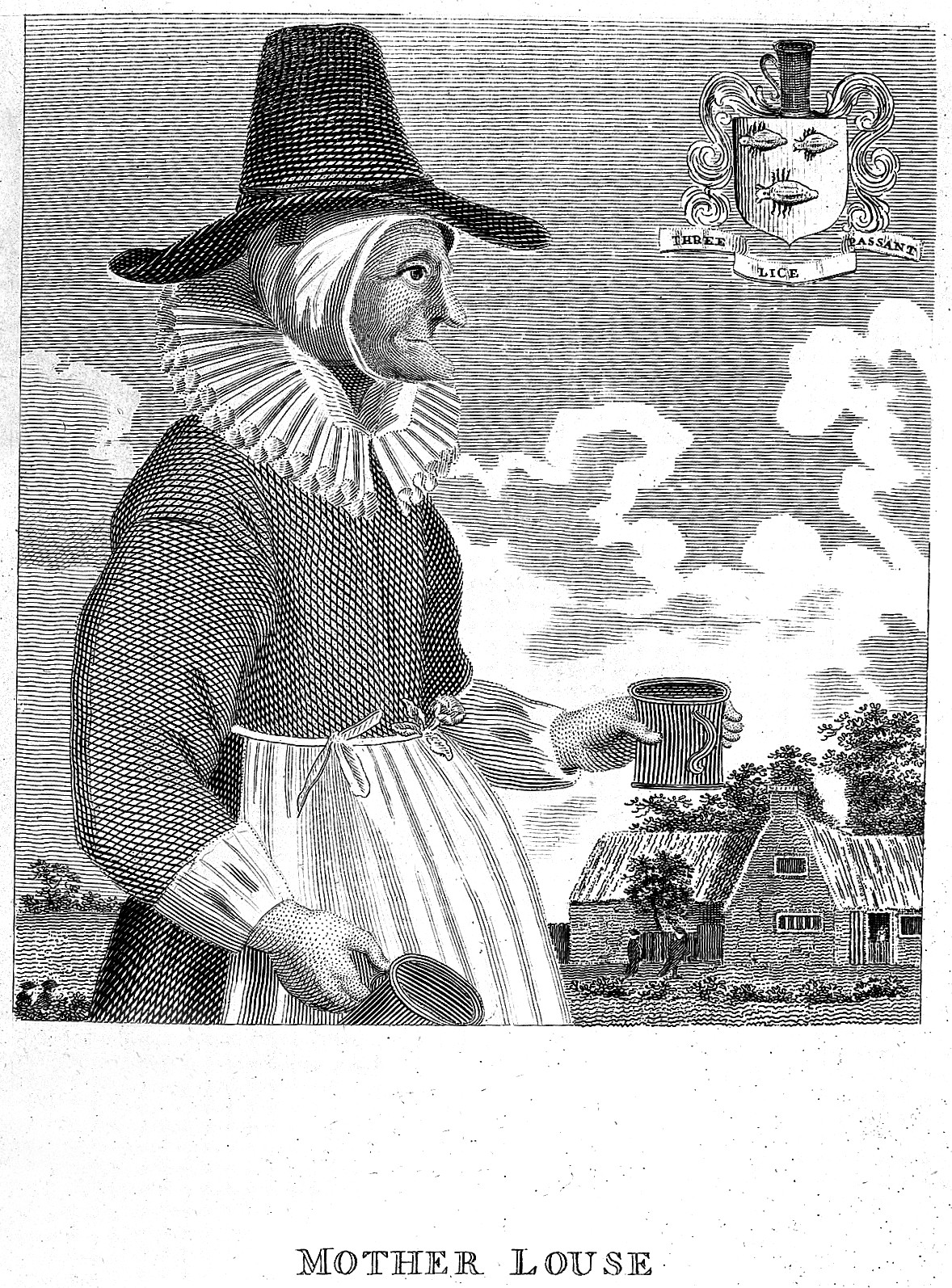
Mother Louse, a notorious alewife in Oxford during the mid 17th century, by David Loggan

An alewife, also brewess or brewster, was a woman who brewed ale for commercial sale. Women have been active in brewing since before the process's industrialisation.

== Etymology ==
The word "alewife" is first recorded in England in 1393 to mean "a woman that keeps an ale-house", synonymous with the word "brewster".

"Alewife" is now commonly used in translations of ancient texts to refer to any woman who brewed and sold ale dating back to the beginning of recorded history.

== Background ==
Although the profession was later taken over by men, the original brewing profession back in ancient Mesopotamia was principally performed by women. The character of Siduri in the Epic of Gilgamesh appears as a divine alewife. Women also brewed the majority of ale for both domestic and commercial use in England before the Black Death, and some women continued brewing into the 17th century. Ale represented a key part of the medieval English diet as it was both the most affordable and clean beverage available. The precise amount of ale that was ingested daily is not known, but it appears to have been up to a gallon a day per person. Because ale went sour within days after being brewed, constant production was necessary to meet demand. Therefore, ale was produced in huge quantities by a relatively simple process that was widely known, although time intensive, most often using malted barley or oats. The ale trade in all of England was legally regulated by the Assize of Bread and Ale, "which linked the price of ale to the price of grain and which ordained public checks on the quality of the brew." Operating outside of this regulation was forbidden and handled severely by the courts.

Public records in the medieval period before the Black Death include regulatory legislation that treats brewing as a solely female profession, indicating that brewing ale was dominated by women. This female dominance of the trade likely evolved because it could be done in the home, supplemented other incomes, and was passed down from previous generations of women. The lack of needed specialization and physical location within the home made ale brewing an accessible trade for women to add income to the household in both towns and countryside communities. Elite wives also apparently engaged in this activity in a supervisory capacity over their female servants without social stigma. Records regarding medieval brewing often leave out the poorer families in which women were almost certainly brewing in small amounts for consumption and irregular sale, possibly because authorities focused only on regular brewing on a larger scale than many families could afford to produce.

== Alcoholic consumption and the ale industry ==
Drinking alcohol daily was a common practice between 1300 and 1700. At this time, the quality of water was so poor that alcohol was preferred for taste. Estimates find the average annual consumption of wine in France to be over 100 liters for the majority of the period 1300–1700s. Drinking was so prevalent at the time that workers could request to be paid in alcohol instead of monetary wages. While they drank alcohol, medieval Europeans did not drink so heavily for inebriation but rather as sustenance for daily life in place of other common drinks such as water.

Because winemaking was a very involved process, and hopped beer had not yet spread from the Netherlands and Belgium, ale and hard cider became popular among the lower classes in medieval England. Medieval ale spoiled quickly, making mass production difficult and resulting in localized industries made up of many small ale producers throughout medieval towns. For example, in 1577 there was one alehouse for every 142 inhabitants per town. The structure of the ale industry meant that women could play an integral part in brewing, selling, and serving ale.

By the late 15th century, hopped beer began supplanting ale as a popular drink in medieval England. Beer brewed with hops was previously only popular in the Netherlands and Belgium, but it gained popularity because it kept fresh longer, was easier to transport, and was used as a military drink more frequently. Because brewers in the Low Countries considered brewing a male trade, women rarely engaged in medieval beer brewing as the industry grew. As the beer industry grew, the female-centric ale market was supplanted in part by the male-centric beer market.

== Ale brewing as a career for women ==
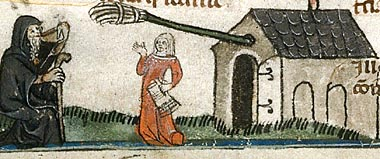
Depiction of an alewife, c. 1300

As a trade in medieval Europe, ale brewing offered women a relatively lucrative and stable career. Even as the industry underwent multiple economic changes in the Late Middle Ages, female brewers and alewives generally found stable work in the trade, particularly when compared to other contemporary female trades.

Women's role in the medieval ale industry likely grew out of the traditional household responsibilities of wives and daughters, who had to brew ale to feed their families. To turn a profit, early medieval women became "small-scale retailers" by selling goods they already produced for private consumption.

Brewing and selling ale (also known as tippling or tapping) enabled women to work for and achieve "good profits, social power, and some measure of independence from men" that other trades at the time did not. Medieval women, particularly unmarried, young, and widowed women, were almost exclusively barred from many methods of self-support. Many medieval industries relied on land ownership, long apprenticeships, and wage work, all of which consistently discriminated against female participation or required heavy male presence for women who did enter these industries. As a result, most women's work in the late medieval period was low skilled, low status, and low profit. Comparatively, brewing and tippling were predominantly female trades that women could operate independently or in equal conjunction with their husband.

Following the Black Death of 1347–50, the brewing trade underwent significant changes that made it a commercialized and specialized trade. Medieval society underwent many changes following the Plague. Changes that had significant effects on the ale trade include the consolidation of urban markets, rising standards of living, greater access to capital, cheaper access to grain, greater demand for ale as a staple of medieval diet, and the centralization and rising popularity of alehouses, all of which made the ale market ripe for capital investment and commercialization. Due to these changes, the ale market transformed from an industry dominated by occasional, home-brewing married and non-married women to a commercialized, professionalized, and male-governed mainstream trade.

As a result, female brewers and alewives in the late 14th and 15th centuries faced one of two fates: greater profit, or marginalization within the trade. Women who managed to remain in the ale trade were usually married, widowed, or had unusual access to money and capital for a craftswoman. The rest of the women engaged in the ale trade, particularly occasional or part-time brewsters, lost the ease of market entry and economic stability they formerly had as ale brewers. These women either found other trades or methods for self-support (marriage, prostitution, etc.), or remained in the ale trade as tipplers and tapsters employed by male brewers. By the 16th century, guilds also centralized and regulated brewing more heavily, which also contributed to the decline of women in the ale trade. The expansion and professionalization of the trade less suited the short-term readily available jobs that women tended to take on while maintaining their roles as wives and mothers.

The trade's changes also enabled medieval men to enter a trade previously dominated by women. Unlike women, men had the legal, capital, social, and cultural resources to command a quickly commercializing industry. As Judith Bennett opines, "Brewsters were, in a sense, disabled by many institutions."

== Married and non-married brewsters ==
While ale brewing and selling was a lucrative and stable trade for all classes of medieval townswomen throughout the Middle Ages, married women and non-married women had differing experiences within this trade.

=== Non-married women ===
Non-married women, including single young women, widows, single mothers, concubines, and deserting or deserted wives, at times engaged in the brewing trade and made enough to support themselves independently. Most non-married women worked in brewing only occasionally, turning to it to support themselves temporarily – before marriage, in between marriages, during times of poverty, and during widowhood. Some non-married women did pursue the trade more permanently, but this was rare. Medieval records show some rare examples of permanent brewers with no mention of a husband (implying single status), including Emma Kempstere of Brigstock, Maud London of Oxford, and Margery de Brundall of Norwich who lived and brewed in the 14th and 15th centuries.

According to non-married brewsters' tax records, profits, and legal statuses as recorded in medieval guild and tax collecting records, brewsters lived more independently and had a higher standard of living when compared to other non-married medieval women. Compared to married female brewsters, non-married brewsters brewed ale less frequently and with less consistency over time. They also earned less than a married woman operating in a married household or in business with her husband.

Until the mid-14th Century, ale was mostly produced in the home, and was sold and consumed in either the home or the local alehouse. Non-married brewsters typically brewed and sold their product from the home, as they lacked the legal or guild standing and money to have their own alehouse. They also rarely had the resources to pay for brewing apprentices or servants and were less likely to have large families to help with the work of brewing. These factors limited the profitability of single brewsters compared to other brewers, and made participation in the industry a less consistent, more occasional practice by non-married brewsters.

Between the 15th and 16th centuries, after the Plague brought the commercialization of brewing, non-married brewsters began slowly disappearing from the trade. Non-married brewsters' part-time or occasional status, lack of access to capital, and lack of a centralized physical location in which to sell their product led to their marginalization by the 16th century. By this time, many non-married women seeking to participate in brewing and the ale trade became tapsters, tipplers, and wageworkers in brewhouses for commercial male brewers.

A small minority of non-married women may have remained brewsters in their own right during this time. For example, there is evidence that some women were members of the London Brewers Guild in their own right in the 15th century; most were widows continuing the trade of their deceased husbands, but some had no record of male relatives and were likely single women.

=== Married women ===
Married brewsters typically brewed in tandem with their husbands, as relatively equal partners in business and production. Because many medieval trades, and brewing specifically, were organized around the household, married brewsters could brew and sell ale for large profits. Accordingly, married brewsters likely had more access to capital and servants through their husbands' economic endeavors, lands, or inheritance. This allowed married brewsters to sustain, expand, and stabilize their trade. As a result of their stability and access to resources, married brewsters "reaped considerable profit from the ale market", earning more than non-married brewsters and more than married women in other trades.

Prior to the 16th century, wives and husbands divided the day-to-day operations of brewing relatively equally, with wives working independently from rather than subordinate to their husbands. The division of labor between brewing couples was typically split between public and managerial roles. The husband almost exclusively held the public responsibilities, including guild activity and serving as the legal representative of the establishment. Wives typically had jurisdiction over the responsibilities of the "conjugal household", which included the physical brewing, management of any laborers, and, if the trade was run out of an alehouse, management of the alehouse itself. As evidenced by records of alewives' medieval guild payments, wives often paid large guild taxes that were listed independently of their brewer husbands. This indicates that women were given credit as equal partners with their husbands for a high profitability.

Following the industry changes in wake of the Black Death, married women remained actors in the newly commercialized trade even as single women disappeared. Commercialised brewing required even greater resources and household investment than before, which married women had access to via their husbands. As commercialisation and higher profitability brought growing numbers of men into the trade, married women's place in brewing was strengthened, although their work within the trade changed. With the departure of most non-married women from the ale trade, independent brewing by all women became less commonly accepted. Married female brewers after the 14th century became less independent from their husbands, but remained in the trade as unofficial managers, brewing laborers, and tapsters in their husbands' alehouses.

== Social and cultural perceptions ==
Brewsters became the scapegoat for the brewing community as a whole for the vices that the medieval world feared from the production of alcohol. In 1540, the city of Chester ordered that no women between the ages of 14 and 40 would be permitted to sell ale, in the hopes of limiting the trade to only women above or below an age of sexual desirability. Women in brewing and selling of ale were accused of being disobedient to their husbands, sexually deviant, but also frequently cheating their customers with watered-down ale and higher prices. While a 1324 record of offenses of brewers and tipplers in Oxford cites that offenses by women and men were relatively equal, most representations of ale sellers only negatively represented the women.

In popular culture of the period as well, the alewife was a common figure of comical condemnation. She was depicted in Dooms or church murals as someone who belonged in hell. Poems such as John Skelton's The Tunning of Elynour Rummyng, The Tale of Beryn and Mother Bunch of Pasquil's Jests all depicted as repulsive figures. Either sexually promiscuous themselves, or employers of prostitutes, the alewife was frequently associated with sinful behavior. Elynour Rummyng produces a parody of a mass while luring men away from church. The character of Kit in The Tale of Beryn seduces one man while flirting with another all for the purpose of selling ale. Mother Bunch's famous ale is said to be made from her nose. Whether laughed at with the alewives or against them, the language of these poems suggest that they were intended for a general public rather than exclusively the courts, making the popularity of the flawed alewife a common role of society.
