= Ada Rapoport-Albert =

Israeli-British scholar (1945–2020)

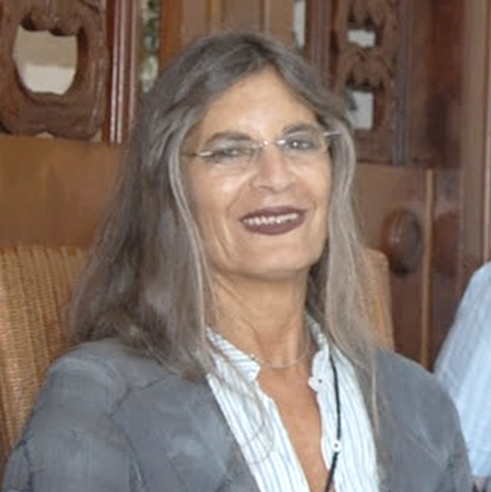
Ada Rapoport-Albert

Ada Rapoport-Albert (Hebrew: עדה רפפורט-אלברט; 26 October 1945 – 18 June 2020) was an Israeli-British scholar whose scholarship focused on Jewish mysticism, Sabbateanism, and gender in Hasidic Judaism. Rapoport-Albert also served as the president of the Jewish Historical Society of England.

== Personal life ==
Ada Rapoport-Albert was born in Tel Aviv in 1945 to Zalman and Alma Rapoport. Her mother was a pianist from Bulgaria, who trained in Vienna. Her father hailed from Berdichev. In the 1960s, Rapoport-Albert came to London to study for her dissertation with Joseph G. Weiss. Under Weiss's supervision, Rapoport-Albert began writing her doctoral dissertation on the Hasidic master, Rabbi Nachman of Breslov. Following Weiss’s death in 1969, her supervisor was the scholar Chimen Abramsky. After a short period at Oxford, Rapoport-Albert became an Associate Professor in Jewish History at University College London (UCL). In 2002, she became head of the department of Hebrew and Jewish Studies at UCL. She also held visiting positions at other institutions. Rapoport-Albert retired in 2012 but continued her research until her death in 2020. Rapoport-Albert died in London on 18 June 2020, aged 74.

== Selected publications ==
=== Books ===
- Women and the Messianic Heresy of Sabbatai Zevi, 1666-1816 (London: Litttman Library of Jewish Civilization).
- Female Bodies - Male Souls: Asceticism and Gender in the Jewish Mystical Tradition (London: Littman Library of Jewish Civilization), forthcoming.
- Hasidic Studies: Essays in History and Gender (Liverpool University Press 2018).

=== Edited volumes ===
- With David Assaf, Let the Old Make Way for the New: Studies in the Social and Cultural History of Eastern European Jewry Presented to Immanuel Etkes, 2 vols. (Jerusalem: The Shazar Center for Jewish History, 2009).
- With Gillian Greenberg, Biblical Hebrew, Biblical Texts: Essays in Memory of Michael P. Weitzman (Sheffield: Sheffield Academic Press, 2001).
- Hasidism Reappraised (London: The Littman Library of Jewish Civilization, 1996).
- Essays in Jewish Historiography (History and Theory Beiheft, 27; Wesleyan University 1988, Reprinted by Scholars Press, Atlanta, Georgia 1991).
- With Steven J. Zipperstein, Jewish History - Essays in Honour of Chimen Abramsky (London: Nicolson & Weidenfeld: Peter Halban, 1988).

=== Articles and Chapters in Books ===
- "The Emergence of a Female Constitutency in Twentieth Century HaBaD", in D. Assaf and A. Rapoport-Albert (eds.), Let the Old Make Way for the New, vol. 1, English Section, pp. 7-68.
- "On the Position of Women in Sabbateanism", in Jerusalem Studies in Jewish Thought 16 (2001), pp. 143-327 (Hebrew).
- "God and the Zaddik as the Two Focal Points of Hasidic Worship", in G. Hundert (ed.), Essential Papers on Hasidism, New York University Press, New York and London 1991, pp. 296-325.
- "The Hasidic Movement After 1772 - Structural Continuity and Change", in A. Rapoport-Albert (ed.), Hasidism Reappraised, pp. 76-140.
- "On Women in Hasidism: S. A. Horodecky and the Maid of Ludmir Tradition", in A. Rapoport-Albert and S. J. Zipperstein (eds), Jewish History: Essays in Honour of Chimen Abramsky, pp. 495-529
- Rapoport-Albert, A. (1988). Hagiography with Footnotes: Edifying Tales and the Writing of History in Hasidism. History and Theory, 27(4), 119-159.
- Rapoport-Albert, A., & Kwasman, T. (2006). Late Aramaic: The Literary and Linguistic Context of the Zohar. Aramaic Studies, 4(1), 5-19.
- Rapoport-Albert, A. (2013). From woman as Hasid to woman as “Tsadik” in the teachings of the last two Lubavitcher rebbes. Jewish History, 27(2), 435-473.

== See also ==
- Naftali Loewenthal
