= Cedar Forest =

Mythological realm

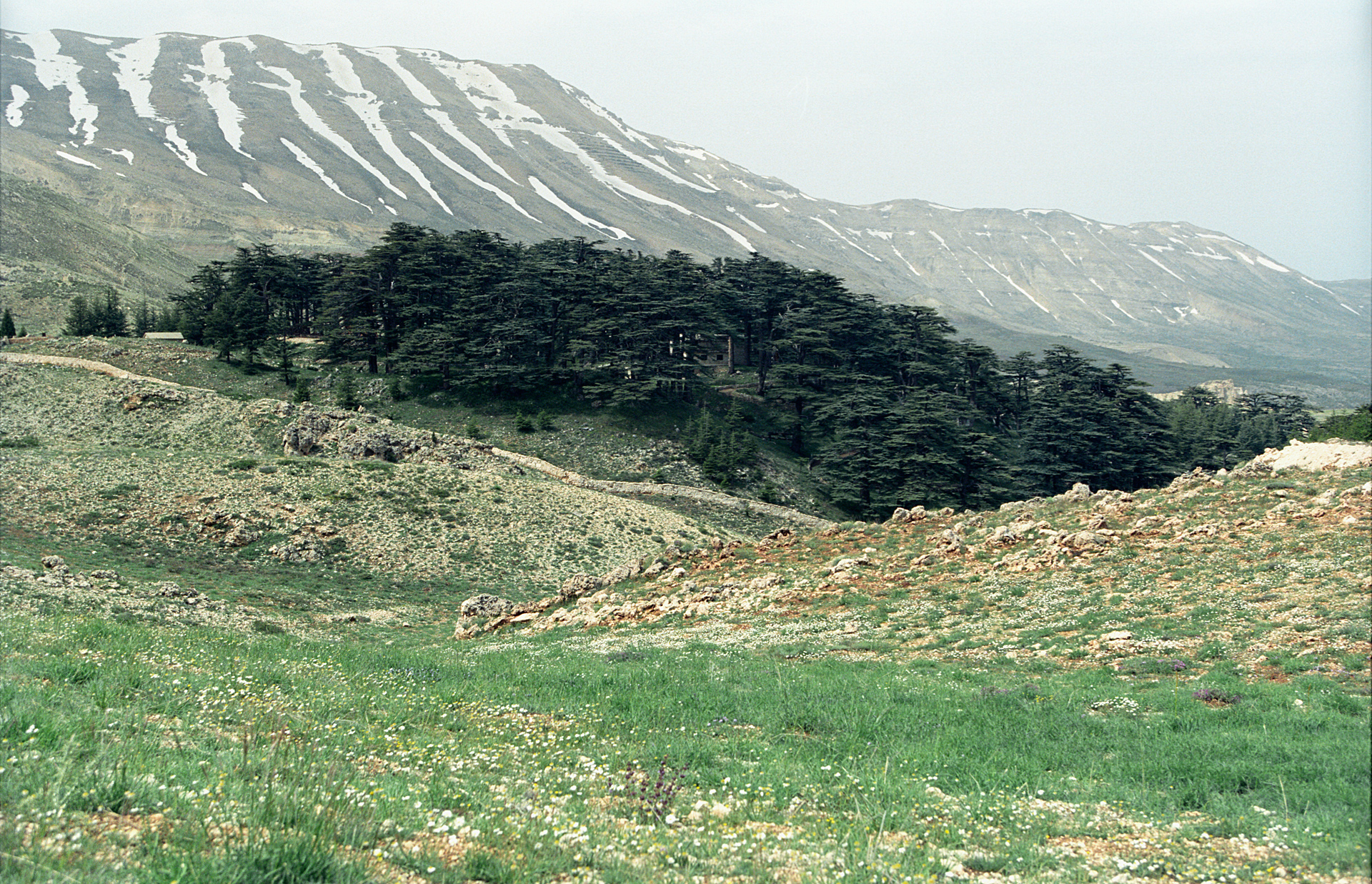
A cedar forest in Lebanon

The Cedar Forest (𒄑𒂞𒄑𒌁giš eren giš tir) is the glorious realm of the gods of Mesopotamian mythology. It is guarded by the demigod Humbaba and was once entered by the hero Gilgamesh who dared cut down cedar trees from its virgin stands during his quest for fame. The Cedar Forest is described in Tablets 4–6 of the Epic of Gilgamesh. Earlier descriptions come from the Ur III poem Gilgamesh and Huwawa.

The Sumerian poems of his deeds say that Gilgamesh traveled east, presumably, to the Zagros Mountains of Iran (ancient Elam) to the cedar forest, yet the later more extensive Babylonian examples place the cedar forests west in Lebanon.

== In the Epic of Gilgamesh ==
=== Tablet 4 ===
Tablet four tells the story of the journey to the Cedar Forest. On each day of the six-day journey, Gilgamesh prays to Shamash; in response to these prayers, Shamash sends Gilgamesh oracular dreams during the night. The first is not preserved. In the second, Gilgamesh dreams that he wrestles a great bull that splits the ground with his breath. Enkidu interprets the dream for Gilgamesh: the dream means that Shamash, the bull, will protect Gilgamesh. In the third, Gilgamesh dreams:

The skies roared with thunder and the earth heaved,
Then came darkness and a stillness like death.
Lightning smashed the ground and fires blazed out;
Death flooded from the skies.
When the heat died and the fires went out,
The plains had turned to ash.

Enkidu's interpretation is missing here, but as with the other dreams, it is assumed he puts a positive spin on the volcanic dream. The fourth dream is missing, but Enkidu again tells Gilgamesh that the dream portends success in the upcoming battle. The fifth dream is also missing.

At the entrance to the Cedar Forest, Gilgamesh begins to tremble with fear; he prays to Shamash, reminding Shamash of his promise to Gilgamesh's mother, Ninsun, that he would be protected. Shamash responds from heaven, instructing him to proceed into the forest because Humbaba is not fully armored. Humbaba typically wears seven coats of armor, but now he is only wearing one, making him particularly vulnerable. Enkidu loses his nerve and retreats, prompting Gilgamesh to tackle him, resulting in a fierce struggle between them. The sound of their battle alerts Humbaba, who emerges from the Cedar Forest to confront the intruders. A significant portion of the tablet is missing at this point. On the remaining fragment of the tablet, Gilgamesh persuades Enkidu that they should stand united against the demon.

=== Tablet 5 ===
Gilgamesh and Enkidu enter the gloriously beautiful Cedar Forest and begin to cut down the trees. Hearing the sound, Humbaba comes roaring up to them and warns them off. Enkidu shouts at Humbaba that the two of them are much stronger than the demon, but Humbaba, who knows Gilgamesh is a king, taunts the king for taking orders from a nobody like Enkidu. Turning his face into a hideous mask, Humbaba begins to threaten the pair, and Gilgamesh runs and hides. Enkidu shouts at Gilgamesh, inspiring him with courage, and Gilgamesh appears from hiding and the two begin their epic battle with Humbaba. Shamash intrudes on the battle, helping the pair, and Humbaba is defeated. On his knees, with Gilgamesh's sword at his throat, Humbaba begs for his life and offers Gilgamesh all the trees in the forest and his eternal servitude. While Gilgamesh is thinking this over, Enkidu intervenes, telling Gilgamesh to kill Humbaba before any of the gods arrive and stop him from doing so. Should he kill Humbaba, he will achieve widespread fame for all the times to come. Gilgamesh, with a great sweep of his sword, removes Humbaba's head. But before he dies, Humbaba screams out a curse on Enkidu: "Of you two, may Enkidu not live the longer, may Enkidu not find any peace in this world!" Soon later Enkidu becomes sick and dies.

Gilgamesh and Enkidu cut down the cedar forest and in particular the tallest of the cedar trees to make a great cedar gate for the city of Nippur. They build a raft out of the cedar and float down the Euphrates to their city.

=== Tablet 6 ===
After these events, Gilgamesh, his fame widespread and his appearance resplendent in his wealthy clothes, attracts the sexual attention of the goddess Ishtar, who comes to Gilgamesh and offers to become his lover. Gilgamesh refuses with insults, listing all the mortal lovers that Ishtar has had and recounting the dire fates they all met with at her hands. Deeply insulted, Ishtar returns to heaven and begs her father, the sky-god Anu, to let her have the Bull of Heaven to wreak vengeance on Gilgamesh and his city:

Father, let me have the Bull of Heaven
To kill Gilgamesh and his city.
For if you do not grant me the Bull of Heaven,
I will pull down the Gates of Hell itself,
Crush the doorposts and flatten the door,
And I will let the dead leave
And let the dead roam the earth
And they shall eat the living.
The dead will overwhelm all the living!

== See also ==
- Cedars of God
- Cedrus libani
- Garden of the Hesperides
- Immortality
- Mount Olympus
- Paradise
- Járnviðr
