= Men and the City =

Book by Saddam Hussein

- Author: Saddam Hussein
- Language: Arabic
- Genre: Historical fiction novel
- Publisher: Iraqi government
- Publication date: 2002
- Publication place: Iraq
- Media type: Print (Hardcover)
- Pages: 320
- Preceded by: Zabibah and the King (2000); The Fortified Castle (2001)
- Followed by: Begone, Demons (2003)

Men and the City (Arabic: رجال ومدينة rujjāl wa-madīna) is a 320-page novel by former Iraqi leader Saddam Hussein which was published in 2002. The work was largely autobiographical in nature and describes how Saddam Hussein's grandfather fought the Turks during the Ottoman Empire. It also focuses on the rise of the Ba'ath Party and several of Saddam's relatives including his uncle. It was the third work which Saddam published. The hero of the novel is a character named Saleh but it is widely assumed that the novel is a thinly veiled autobiography of Saddam himself.

Although there are some suggestions that the text was ghost written, a review of Men and the City by Sa'adoon Al-Zubaydi, Saddam Hussein's presidential translator, confirms that Saddam was indeed the author:

Often the text is illegible. It must be rewritten, clarified. It is not true, however, that the texts were written by his secretary, as has been insinuated. I have seen all of the original manuscripts. They were written in Saddam's typical orderly handwriting, with few deletions and many repetitions. When he stumbled upon a new word, especially a complicated one, he would become fascinated with it and use it again and again, almost always inappropriately.

Saddam Hussein, the former ruler of Iraq, published four books in total. All of his works were published under the pen-name 'the author' probably to preach his ideology. Although the Iraqi government included the books on the nations' syllabus for Iraqi schools, after the war the Saddam's books enjoyed something of a renaissance, with official copies and bootleg copies of his last book selling out.

Before the 2003 Invasion of Iraq, Men and the City along with two of Saddam's other novels Zabibah and the King and The Fortified Castle were put on the syllabus of Iraqi schools. Saddam's name never appeared on any of the front covers with "A novel written by its author" appearing instead. The novel was like Saddam's previous literary efforts praised by Iraqi literary critics and authors upon its publication.

== See also ==
- Saddam Hussein's novels
