= Gilgamesh =

Sumerian ruler and protagonist of the Epic of Gilgamesh

Gilgamesh 𒀭𒄑𒂆𒈦 𒀭𒄑𒉋𒂵𒎌
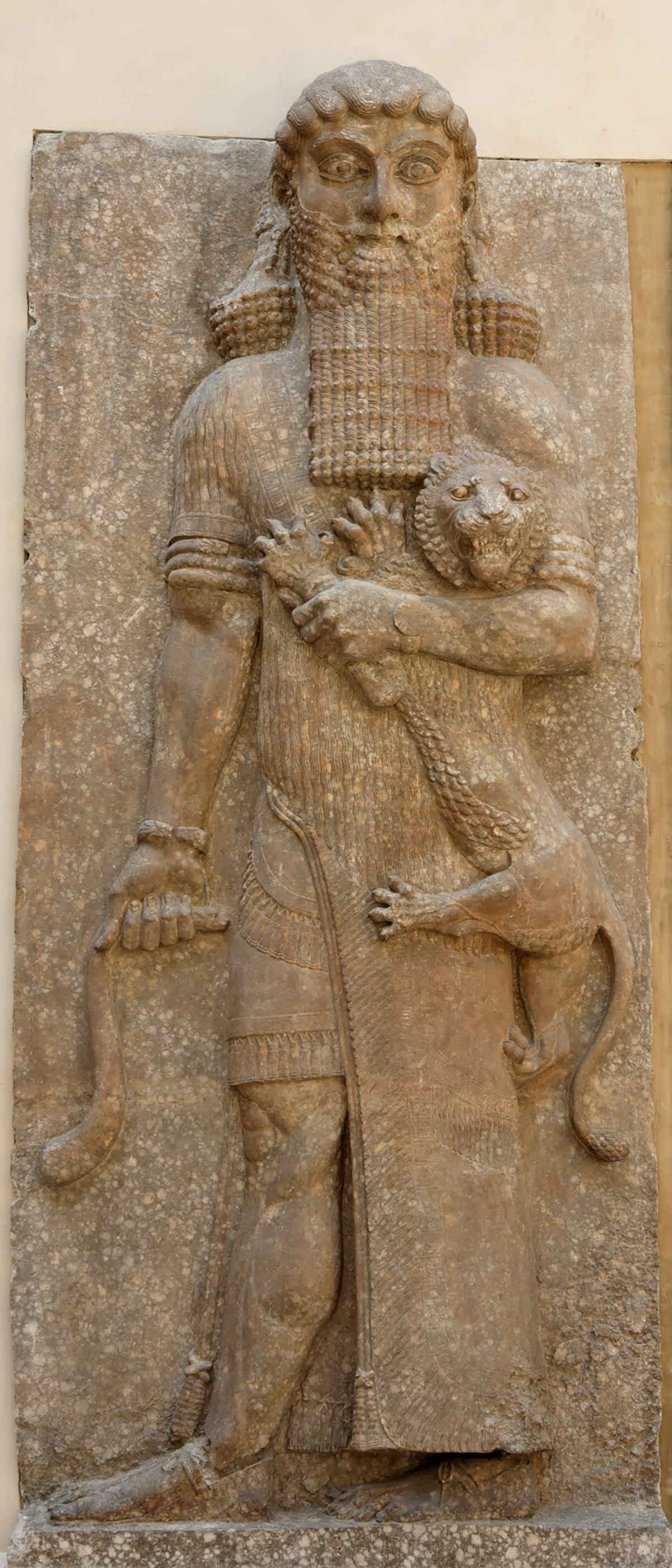
- Possible representation of Gilgamesh as Master of Animals, grasping a lion in his left arm and snake in his right hand, in an Assyrian palace relief (713–706 BC), from Dur-Sharrukin, now held in the Louvre

King of Uruk
- Reign: c. 2900–2350 BC (EDI)
- Predecessor: Dumuzid
- Successor: Ur-Nungal
- Issue: Ur-Nungal
- Father: Lugalbanda (in Sumerian poetry)
- Mother: Ninsun (in Sumerian poetry)

Gilgamesh (/ˈɡɪlɡəmɛʃ/, /ɡɪlˈɡɑːmɛʃ/; Akkadian: 𒀭𒄑𒂆𒈦, romanized: Gilgāmeš; originally Sumerian: 𒀭𒄑𒉋𒂵𒎌, romanized: Bilgames) (Note: The name translates roughly as "The Ancestor is a Young-man", from Bil.ga "Ancestor", Elder and Mes/Mesh3 "Young-Man". See also The Electronic Pennsylvania Sumerian Dictionary. University of Pennsylvania. Archived from the original on 24 September 2018..) was a hero in ancient Mesopotamian mythology and the protagonist of the Epic of Gilgamesh, an epic poem written in Akkadian during the late 2nd millennium BC. He was possibly a historical king of the Sumerian city-state of Uruk, who was posthumously deified. His rule probably would have taken place sometime in the beginning of the Early Dynastic Period, c. 2900–2350 BC, though he became a major figure in Sumerian legend during the Third Dynasty of Ur (c. 2112 – c. 2004 BC).

Tales of Gilgamesh's legendary exploits are narrated in five surviving Sumerian poems. The earliest of these is likely "Gilgamesh, Enkidu, and the Netherworld", in which Gilgamesh comes to the aid of the goddess Inanna and drives away the creatures infesting her huluppu tree. She gives him two unknown objects, a mikku and a pikku, which he loses. Gilgamesh's companion Enkidu dies and his shade tells Gilgamesh about the bleak conditions in the Underworld. The poem Gilgamesh and Aga describes Gilgamesh's revolt against his overlord Aga of Kish. Other Sumerian poems recount Gilgamesh's defeat of the giant Huwawa and the Bull of Heaven, while a fifth, poorly preserved poem relates the account of his death and funeral.

In later Babylonian times, these stories were woven into a connected narrative. The standard Akkadian Epic of Gilgamesh was composed by a scribe named Sîn-lēqi-unninni, probably during the Middle Babylonian Period (c. 1600 – c. 1155 BC), based on much older source material. In the epic, Gilgamesh is a demigod of superhuman strength who befriends the wild man Enkidu. Together, they embark on many journeys, most famously defeating Humbaba (Sumerian: Huwawa) and the Bull of Heaven, who is sent to attack them by Ishtar (Sumerian: Inanna) after Gilgamesh rejects her offer for him to become her consort. After Enkidu dies of a disease sent as punishment from the gods, Gilgamesh becomes afraid of his own death and visits the sage Utnapishtim, the survivor of the Great Flood, hoping to find immortality. Gilgamesh repeatedly fails the trials set before him and returns home to Uruk, realizing that immortality is beyond his reach.

Most scholars agree that the Epic of Gilgamesh exerted substantial influence on the Iliad and the Odyssey, two epic poems written in ancient Greek during the 8th century BC. The story of Gilgamesh's birth is described in an anecdote in On the Nature of Animals by the Greek writer Aelian (2nd century AD). Aelian relates that Gilgamesh's grandfather kept his mother under guard to prevent her from becoming pregnant, because an oracle had told him that his grandson would overthrow him. She became pregnant, and the guards threw the child off a tower, but an eagle rescued him mid-fall and delivered him safely to an orchard, where the gardener raised him.

The Epic of Gilgamesh was rediscovered in the Library of Ashurbanipal in 1849. After being translated in the early 1870s, it caused widespread controversy due to similarities between portions of it and the Hebrew Bible. Gilgamesh remained mostly obscure until the mid-20th century, but, since the late 20th century, he has become an increasingly prominent figure in modern culture.

== Name ==
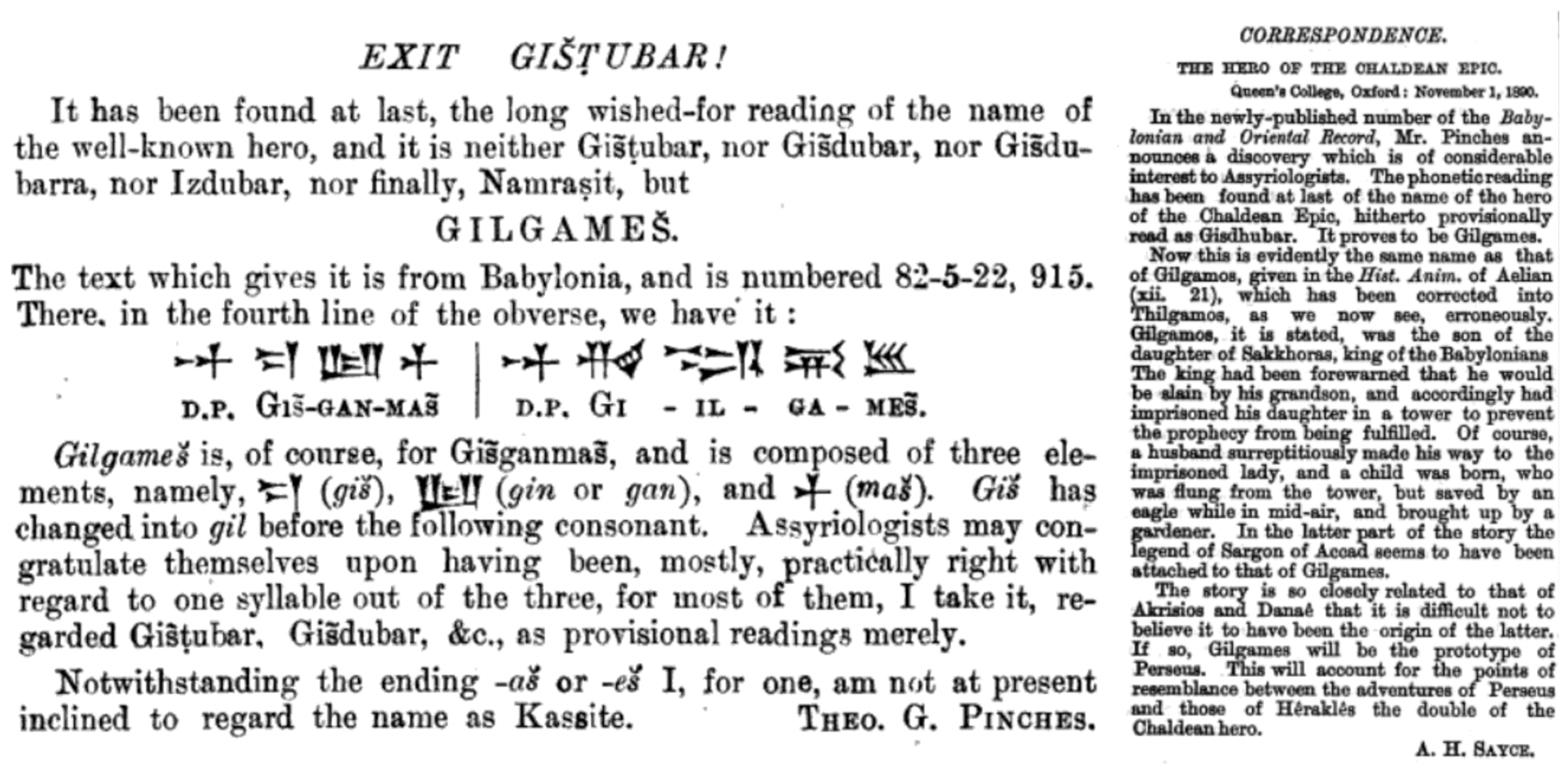
Exit Gišțubar! Theophilus Pinches' 1890 publication of the correct name of Gilgamesh, which had previously been deciphered as Izdubar. This was followed by Archibald Sayce noting that the name had appeared in Aelian's De Natura Animalium as Classical Greek: Γίλγαμος, romanized: Gilgamos in the early 200s CE.

The modern form "Gilgamesh" is a direct borrowing of the Akkadian 𒀭𒄑𒂆𒈦, rendered as Gilgāmeš. The Assyrian form of the name derived from the earlier Sumerian form 𒀭𒄑𒉋𒂵𒎌, Bilgames. It is generally concluded that the name itself translates as "the (kinsman) is a hero", though what type of "kinsman" was meant is a point of controversy. It is sometimes suggested that the Sumerian form of the name was pronounced Pabilgames, reading the component bilga as pabilga (𒉺𒉋𒂵), a related term which described familial relations, but this is not supported by epigraphic or phonological evidence.

== Historical king ==
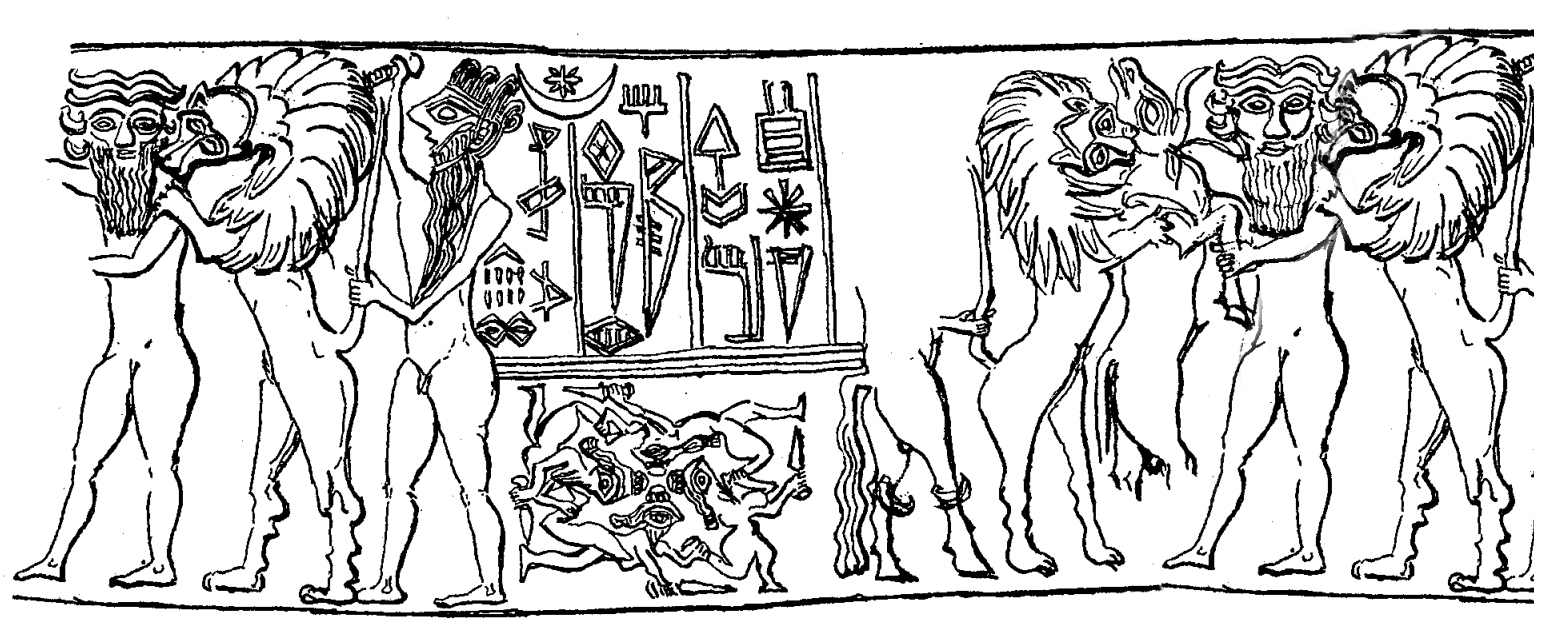
Seal impression of "Mesannepada, king of Kish", excavated in the Royal Cemetery at Ur (U. 13607), dated circa 2600 BC. The seal shows Gilgamesh and the mythical bull between two lions, one of the lions biting him in the shoulder. On each side of this group appears Enkidu and a hunter-hero, with a long beard and a Kish-style headdress, armed with a dagger. Under the text, four runners with beards and long hair form a human swastika. They are armed with daggers and catch each other's feet.

Most historians generally agree that Gilgamesh was a historical king of the Sumerian city-state of Uruk, who probably ruled sometime during the early part of the Early Dynastic Period (c. 2900–2350 BC). Stephanie Dalley, a scholar of the ancient Near East, states that "precise dates cannot be given for the lifetime of Gilgamesh, but they are generally agreed to lie between 2800 and 2500 BC". An inscription, possibly belonging to a contemporary official under Gilgamesh, was discovered in the archaic texts at Ur; his name reads: "Gilgameš is the one whom Utu has selected". Aside from this the Tummal Inscription, a thirty-four-line historiographic text written during the reign of Ishbi-Erra (c. 1953 – c. 1920 BC), also mentions him. The inscription credits Gilgamesh with building the walls of Uruk. Lines eleven through fifteen of the inscription read:

For a second time, the Tummal fell into ruin,
Gilgamesh built the Numunburra of the House of Enlil.
Ur-lugal, the son of Gilgamesh,
Made the Tummal pre-eminent,
Brought Ninlil to the Tummal.

Gilgamesh is also connected to King Enmebaragesi of Kish, a known historical figure who may have lived near Gilgamesh's lifetime. Furthermore, he is listed as one of the kings of Uruk by the Sumerian King List. Fragments of an epic text found in Mê-Turan (modern Tell Haddad) relate that upon his death Gilgamesh was buried under the river bed, and the workmen of Uruk temporarily diverted the flow of the Euphrates for this purpose.

According to Andrew George,

it seems likely that there was once a King Bilgameš in Uruk, just as there may have been in Britain a real King Arthur. But the Gilgameš of the epic traditions is a literary character, to whom any number of originally disparate traditions have accrued. It is vain to hope to find in history such a hero of legend.

== Deification and legendary exploits ==
=== Sumerian poems ===
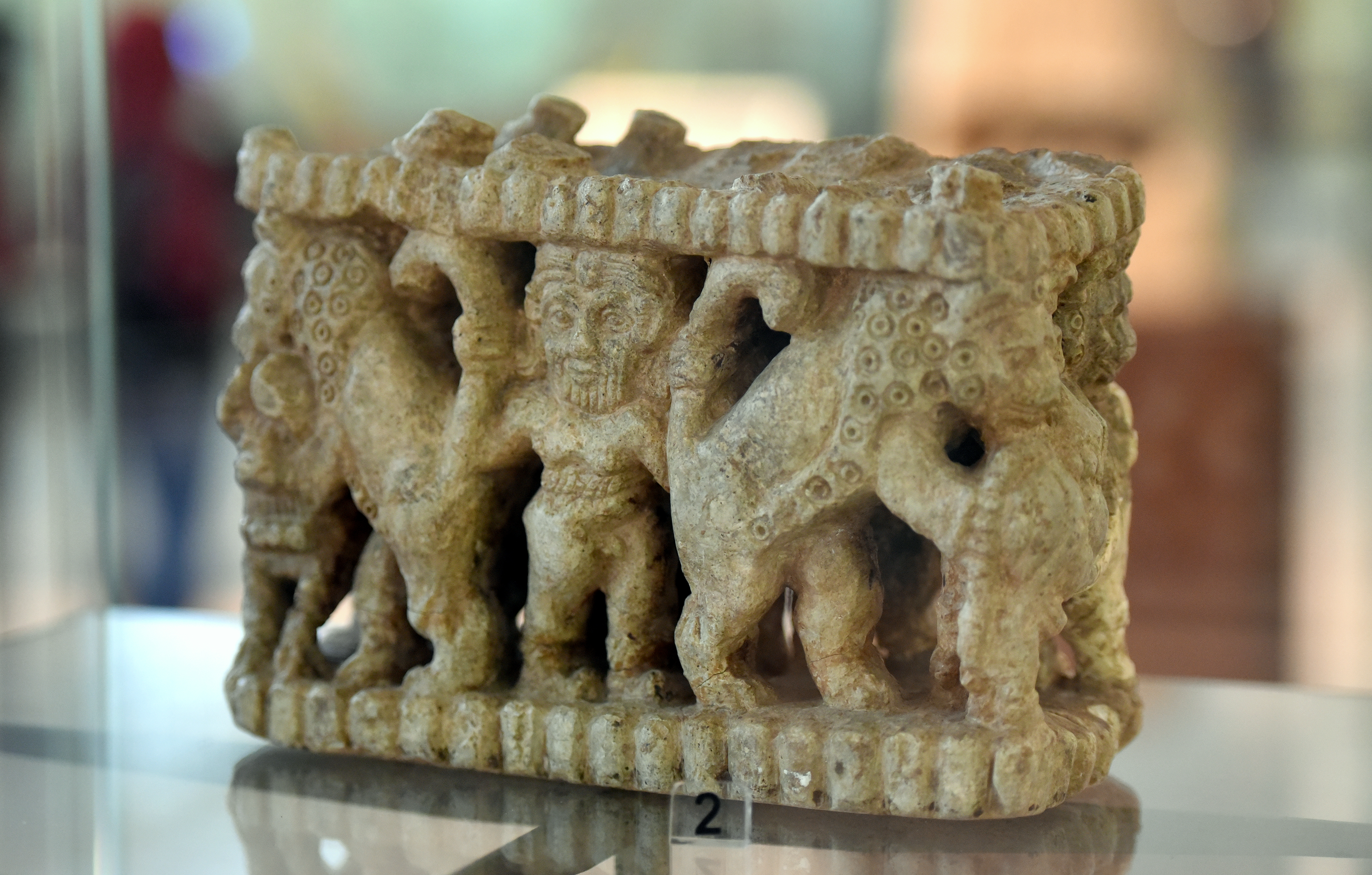
Sculpted scene depicting Gilgamesh wrestling with animals. From the Shara temple at Tell Agrab, Diyala Region, Iraq. Early Dynastic Period, 2600–2370 BC. On display at the National Museum of Iraq in Baghdad.

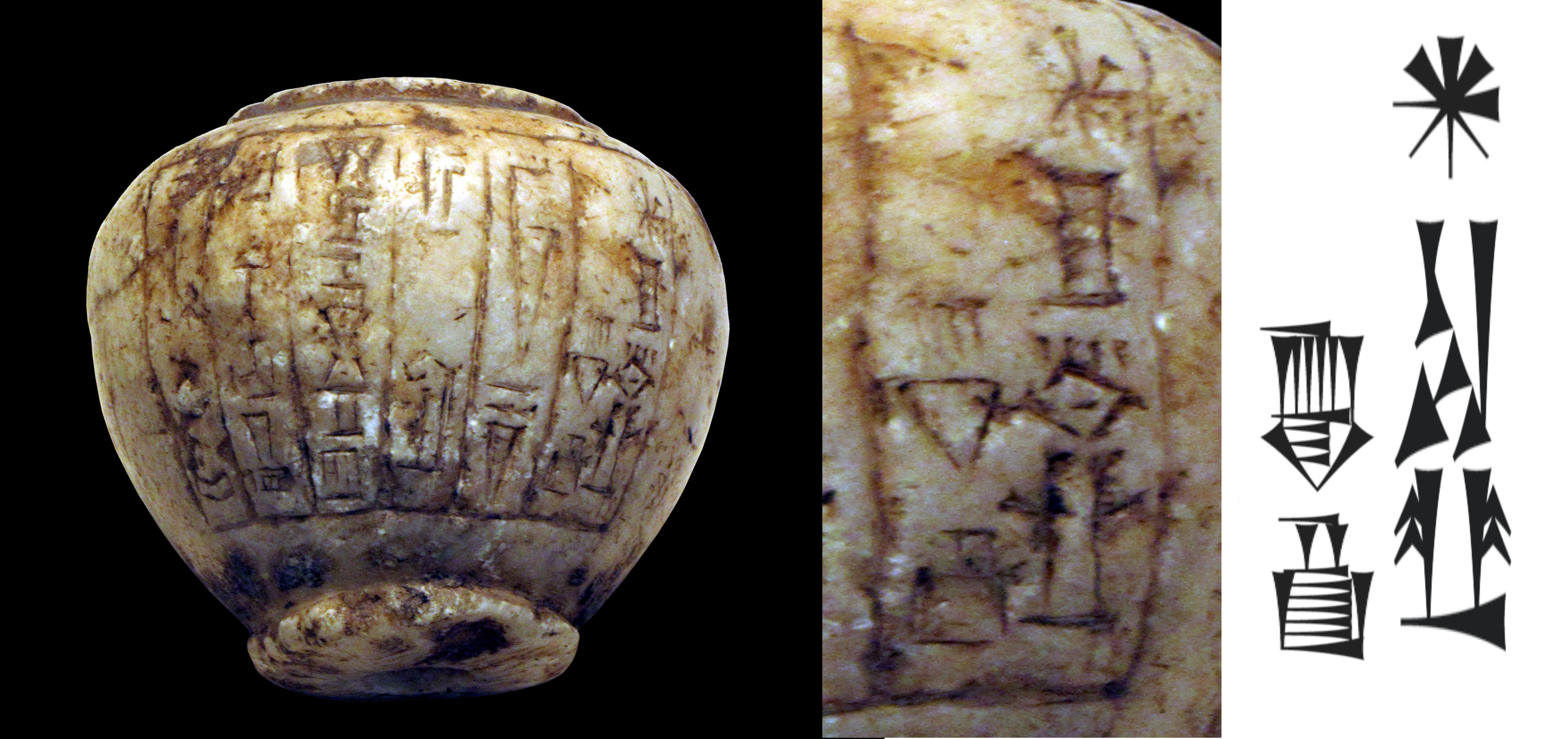
Mace dedicated to Gilgamesh, with transcription of the name Gilgamesh (𒀭𒉈𒂵𒈩) in standard Sumero-Akkadian cuneiform, Ur III period, between 2112 and 2004 BC

It is certain that, during the later Early Dynastic Period, Gilgamesh was worshiped as a god at various locations across Sumer. In the 21st century BC, King Utu-hengal of Uruk adopted Gilgamesh as his patron deity. The kings of the Third Dynasty of Ur (c. 2112 – c. 2004 BC) were especially fond of Gilgamesh, calling him their "divine brother" and "friend." King Shulgi of Ur (2029–1982 BC) declared himself the son of Lugalbanda and Ninsun and the brother of Gilgamesh. Over the centuries, there may have been a gradual accretion of stories about Gilgamesh, some possibly derived from the real lives of other historical figures, such as Gudea, the Second Dynasty ruler of Lagash (2144–2124 BC). Prayers inscribed on clay tablets address Gilgamesh as a judge of the dead in the Underworld.

==== "Gilgamesh, Enkidu, and the Netherworld" ====
During this period, a large number of myths and legends developed surrounding Gilgamesh. Five independent Sumerian poems have been discovered narrating his exploits. Gilgamesh's first appearance in literature is probably in the Sumerian poem "Gilgamesh, Enkidu, and the Netherworld". The narrative begins with a huluppu tree—perhaps, according to the Sumerologist Samuel Noah Kramer, a willow, growing on the banks of the river Euphrates. The goddess Inanna moves the tree to her garden in Uruk with the intention to carve it into a throne once it is fully grown. The tree grows and matures, but the serpent "who knows no charm," the Anzû-bird, and Lilitu, a Mesopotamian demon, invade the tree, causing Inanna to cry with sorrow.

Gilgamesh, who in this story is portrayed as Inanna's brother, slays the serpent, causing the Anzû-bird and Lilitu to flee. Gilgamesh's companions chop down the tree and carve it into a bed and a throne for Inanna. The goddess responds by fashioning a pikku and a mikku (perhaps a drum and drumsticks) as a reward for Gilgamesh's heroism. But Gilgamesh loses the pikku and mikku and asks who will retrieve them. His servant Enkidu descends to the Underworld to find them, but he disobeys its strict laws and can never return. In the remaining dialog, Gilgamesh questions the shade of his lost comrade about the Underworld.

==== Subsequent poems ====
Story of Gilgamesh and Aga
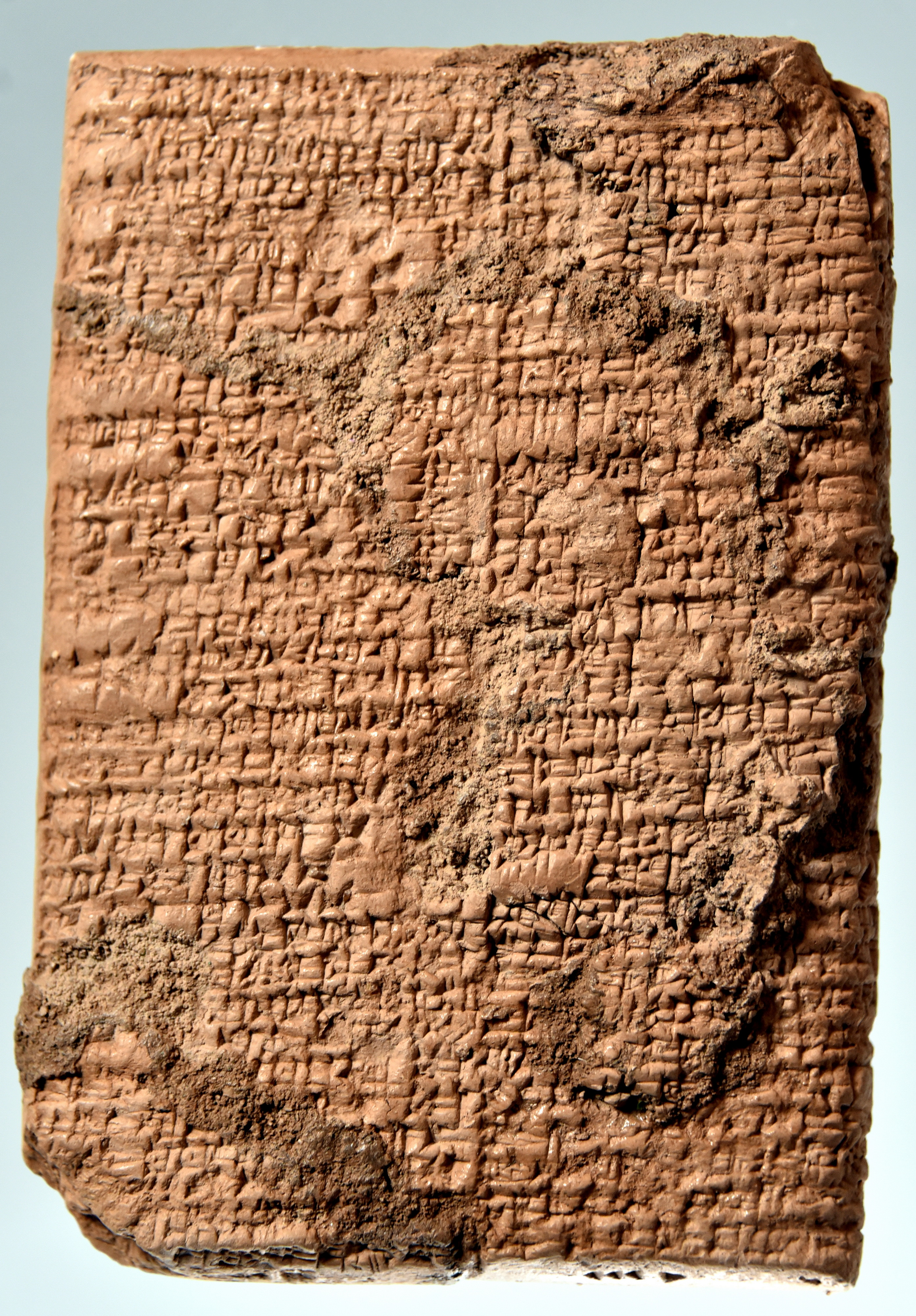
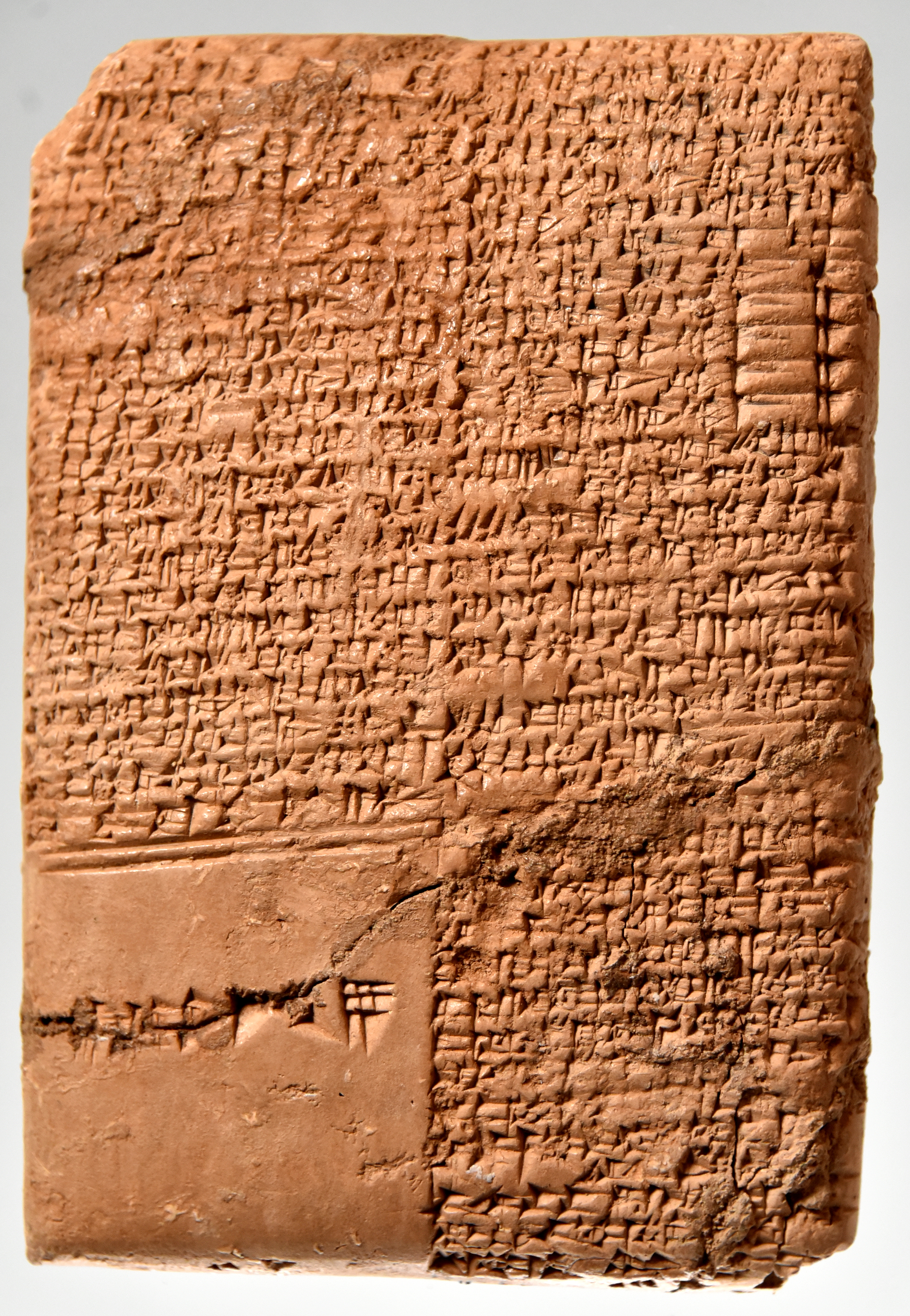
Story of "Gilgamesh and Agga". Old Babylonian period, from southern Iraq. Sulaymaniyah Museum, Iraq

Gilgamesh and Agga describes Gilgamesh's successful revolt against his liege lord Agga, king of the city-state of Kish. Gilgamesh and Huwawa describes how Gilgamesh and his servant Enkidu, with the help of fifty volunteers from Uruk, defeat the monster Huwawa, an ogre appointed as guardian of the Cedar Forest by the ruling god Enlil.

In Gilgamesh and the Bull of Heaven, Gilgamesh and Enkidu slay the Bull of Heaven, who has been sent to attack them by the goddess Inanna. The details of this poem differ substantially from the corresponding episode in the later Akkadian Epic of Gilgamesh. In the Sumerian poem, Inanna remains aloof from Gilgamesh, but in the Akkadian epic she asks him to become her consort. Also, while pressing her father An to give her the Bull of Heaven, in Sumerian Inanna threatens a deafening cry that will reach the earth, while in Akkadian she threatens to wake the dead to eat the living.

A poem known as The Death of Gilgamesh is poorly preserved, but appears to describe a major state funeral followed by the arrival of the deceased in the Underworld. The poem may have been misinterpreted, and may actually depict the death of Enkidu. In the Sumerian poem, The Death of Gilgamesh, the hero Gilgamesh dies and meets Ningishzida, along with Dumuzid, in the underworld. As dwellers of the underworld, both of them could be, on occasion, associated with Gilgamesh as well. The eponymous hero's mother Ninsun mentions to Shamash that she is aware her son is destined to "dwell in the land of no return" with him. In the, Death of Gilgamesh, the hero is promised a position in the underworld equal to that of Ningishzida.

=== Epic of Gilgamesh ===
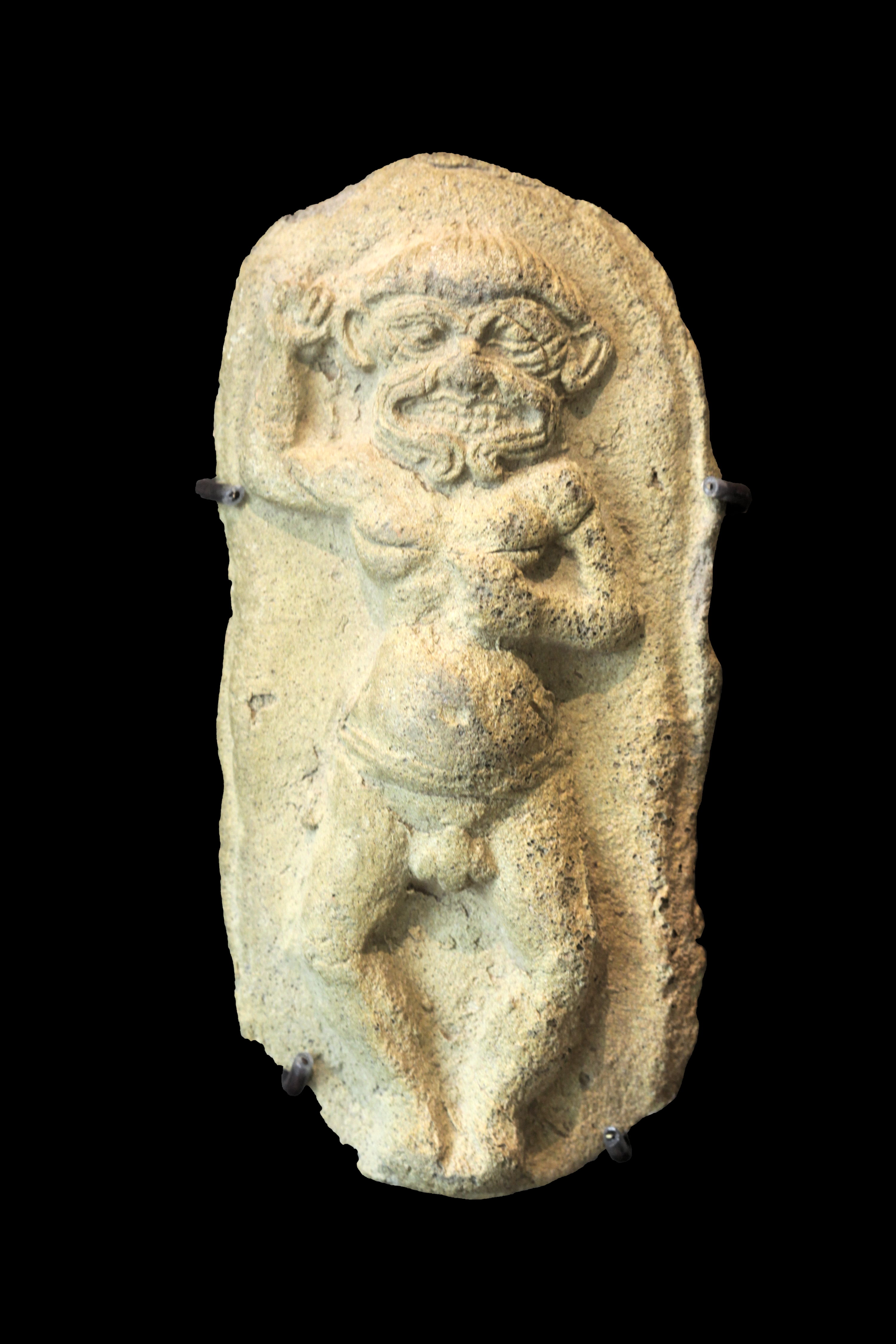
The ogre Humbaba, shown in this terracotta plaque from the Old Babylonian Period, is one of the opponents fought by Gilgamesh and his companion Enkidu in the Epic of Gilgamesh.

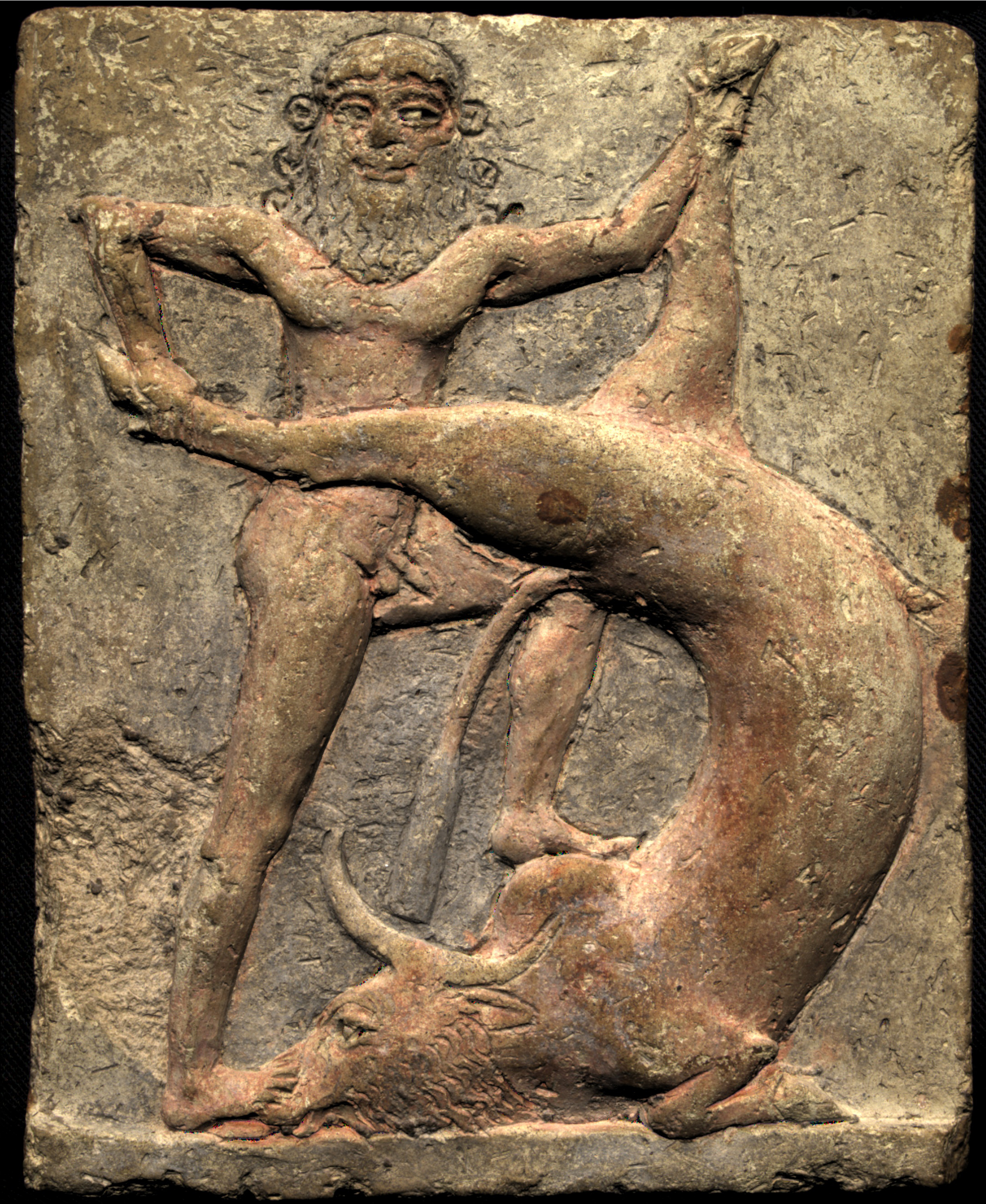
Ancient Mesopotamian terracotta relief (c. 2250–1900 BC) showing Gilgamesh slaying the Bull of Heaven, an episode described in Tablet VI of the Epic of Gilgamesh

Eventually, according to Kramer (1963):

Gilgamesh became the hero par excellence of the ancient world—an adventurous, brave, but tragic figure symbolizing man's vain but endless drive for fame, glory, and immortality.

By the Old Babylonian Period (c. 1830 – c. 1531 BC), stories of Gilgamesh's legendary exploits had been woven into one or several long epics. The Epic of Gilgamesh, the most complete account of Gilgamesh's adventures, was composed in Akkadian during the Middle Babylonian Period (c. 1600 – c. 1155 BC) by a scribe named Sîn-lēqi-unninni. The most complete surviving version of the Epic of Gilgamesh is recorded on a set of twelve clay tablets dating to the seventh century BC, found in the Library of Ashurbanipal in the Assyrian capital of Nineveh, with many pieces missing or damaged. Some scholars and translators choose to supplement the missing parts with material from the earlier Sumerian poems or from other versions of the epic found at other sites throughout the Near East.

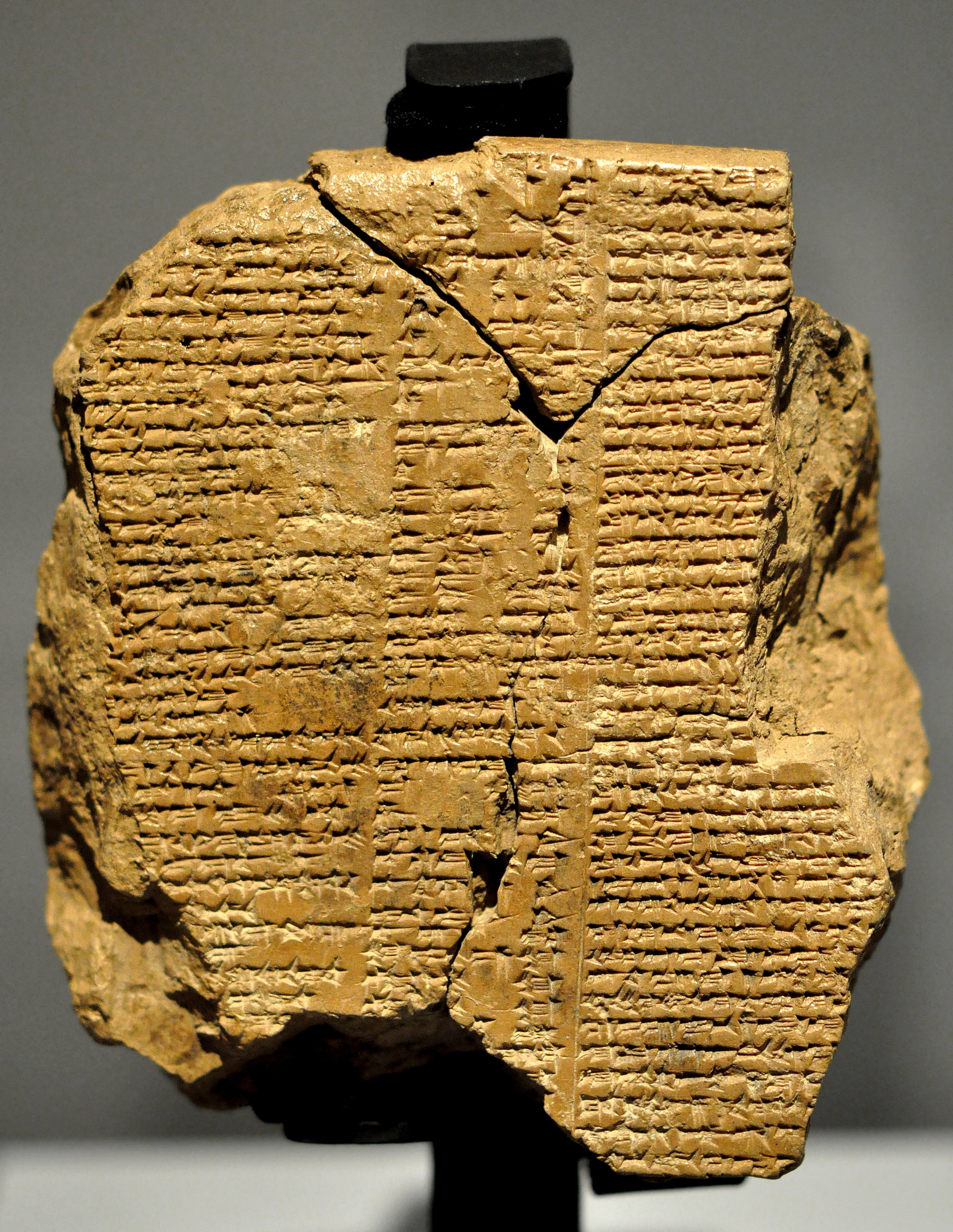
Tablet V of the Epic of Gilgamesh. The Sulaymaniyah Museum, Iraq

In the epic, Gilgamesh is introduced as "two thirds divine and one third mortal". At the beginning of the poem, Gilgamesh is described as a brutal, oppressive ruler. This is usually interpreted to mean either forced labor or sexual exploitation. As punishment for his cruelty, the god Anu creates the wild man Enkidu. After being tamed by a prostitute named Shamhat, Enkidu journeys to Uruk to confront Gilgamesh. In the second tablet, the two men wrestle, and though Gilgamesh wins in the end, he is so impressed by his opponent's strength and tenacity that they become close friends. In the earlier Sumerian texts, Enkidu is Gilgamesh's servant, but, in the Epic of Gilgamesh, they are companions of equal standing.

In tablets III through IV, Gilgamesh and Enkidu travel to the Cedar Forest, which is guarded by Humbaba (the Akkadian name for Huwawa). The heroes cross the seven mountains to the Cedar Forest, where they begin chopping down trees. Confronted by Humbaba, Gilgamesh panics and prays to Shamash (the East Semitic name for Utu), who blows eight winds in Humbaba's eyes, blinding him. Humbaba begs for mercy, but the heroes decapitate him. Tablet VI begins with Gilgamesh returning to Uruk, where Ishtar (the Akkadian name for Inanna) comes to him and demands him as her consort. Gilgamesh rejects her, reproaching her mistreatment of all her former lovers.

In revenge, Ishtar goes to her father Anu and demands that he give her the Bull of Heaven, which she sends to attack Gilgamesh. Gilgamesh and Enkidu kill the Bull and offer its heart to Shamash. While Gilgamesh and Enkidu are resting, Ishtar stands up on the walls of Uruk and curses Gilgamesh. Enkidu tears off the Bull's right thigh and throws it in Ishtar's face, saying, "If I could lay my hands on you, it is this I should do to you, and lash your entrails to your side." Ishtar calls together "the crimped courtesans, prostitutes and harlots" and orders them to mourn for the Bull of Heaven. Meanwhile, Gilgamesh holds a celebration over the Bull's defeat.

Tablet VII begins with Enkidu recounting a dream in which he saw Anu, Ea, and Shamash declare that either Gilgamesh or Enkidu must die to avenge the Bull of Heaven. They choose Enkidu, who soon grows sick. He has a dream of the Underworld, and then dies. Tablet VIII describes Gilgamesh's inconsolable grief for his friend and the details of Enkidu's funeral. Tablets IX through XI relate how Gilgamesh, driven by grief and fear of his own mortality, travels a great distance and overcomes many obstacles to find the home of Utnapishtim, the sole survivor of the Great Flood, who was rewarded with immortality by the gods.

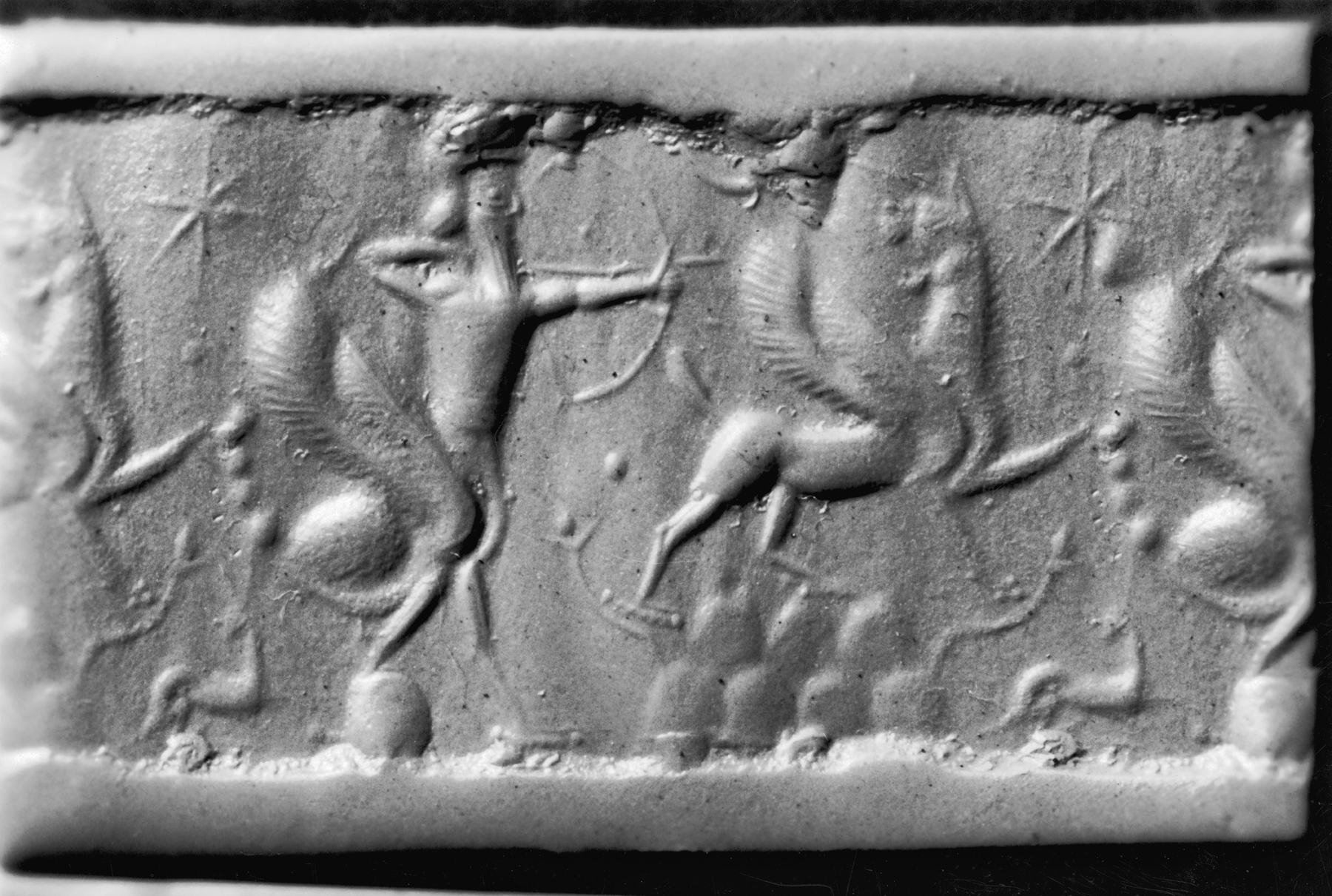
Early Middle Assyrian cylinder seal impression dating between 1400 and 1200 BC, showing a man with bird wings and a scorpion tail firing an arrow at a griffin on a hillock. A scorpion man is among the creatures Gilgamesh encounters on his journey to the homeland of Utnapishtim.

The journey to Utnapishtim involves a series of episodic challenges, which probably originated as major independent adventures, but, in the epic, they are reduced to what Joseph Eddy Fontenrose calls "fairly harmless incidents". First, Gilgamesh encounters and slays lions in the mountain pass. Upon reaching the mountain of Mashu, Gilgamesh encounters a scorpion man and his wife; their bodies flash with terrifying radiance, but once Gilgamesh tells them his purpose, they allow him to pass. Gilgamesh wanders through darkness for twelve days before he finally comes into the light. He finds a beautiful garden by the sea in which he meets Siduri, the divine Alewife. At first, she tries to prevent Gilgamesh from entering the garden, and then attempts to persuade him to accept death as inevitable and not journey beyond the waters. When Gilgamesh persists in his quest, she directs him to Urshanabi, the ferryman of the gods, who takes Gilgamesh across the sea to Utnapishtim. When Gilgamesh finally arrives at Utnapishtim's home, Utnapishtim tells Gilgamesh that, to become immortal, he must defy sleep. Gilgamesh attempts this, but fails and falls into a seven-day sleep.

Next, Utnapishtim tells him that, even if he cannot obtain immortality, he can restore his youth with a rejuvenating herb. Gilgamesh takes the plant, but leaves it on the shore while swimming, and a snake steals it, explaining why snakes shed their skins. Despondent at this loss, Gilgamesh returns to Uruk, and shows his city to the ferryman Urshanabi. At this point the continuous narrative ends. Tablet XII is an appendix corresponding to the Sumerian poem of Gilgamesh, Enkidu and the Netherworld describing the loss of the pikku and mikku.

Numerous elements reveal a lack of continuity with the earlier portions of the epic. At the beginning of Tablet XII, Enkidu is still alive, despite having previously died in Tablet VII, and Gilgamesh is kind to Ishtar, despite the violent rivalry between them in Tablet VI. Also, while most of the parts of the epic are free adaptations of their respective Sumerian predecessors, Tablet XII is a literal, word-for-word translation of the last part of Gilgamesh, Enkidu, and the Netherworld, and was probably relegated to the end because it did not fit the larger epic narrative. In it, Gilgamesh sees a vision of Enkidu's ghost, who promises to recover the lost items and describes to his friend the abysmal condition of the Underworld.

=== In Mesopotamian art ===
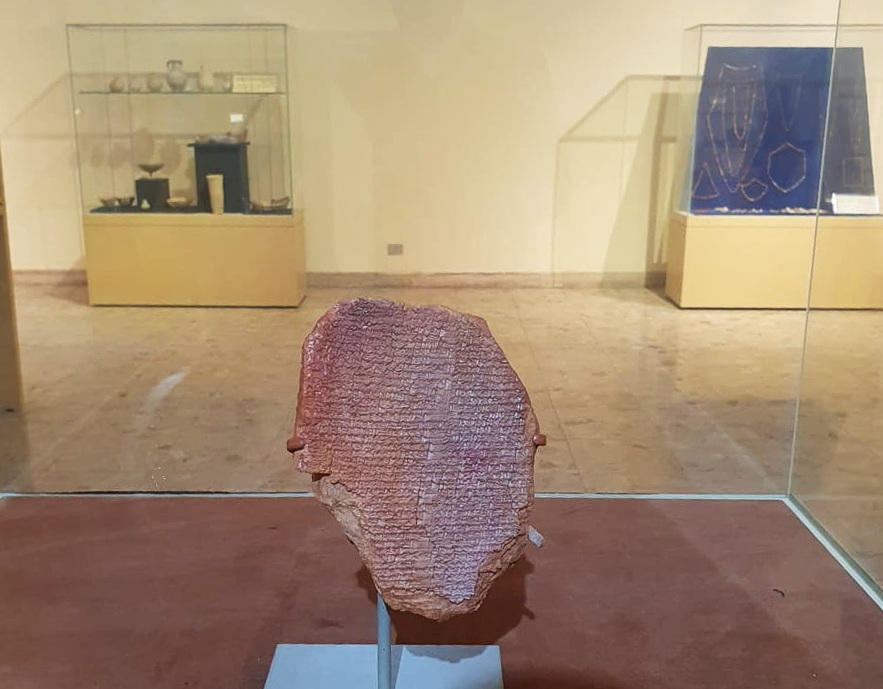
The Gilgamesh Dream tablet. From Iraq. Middle Babylonian Period, First Sealand Dynasty, 1732–1460 BC. Iraq Museum, Baghdad. This dream tablet recounts a part of the epic of Gilgamesh in which the hero (Gilgamesh) describes his dreams to his mother (the goddess Ninsun), who interprets them as announcing the arrival of a new friend, who will become his companion.

Although stories about Gilgamesh were wildly popular throughout ancient Mesopotamia, authentic representations of him in ancient art are uncommon. Popular works often identify depictions of a hero with long hair, containing four or six curls, as representations of Gilgamesh, but this identification is known to be incorrect. A few genuine ancient Mesopotamian representations of Gilgamesh do exist, however. These representations are mostly found on clay plaques and cylinder seals. Generally, it is only possible to identify a figure as Gilgamesh if the work clearly depicts a scene from the Epic of Gilgamesh itself. One set of representations of Gilgamesh is found in scenes of two heroes fighting a demonic giant, clearly Humbaba. Another set is found in scenes showing a similar pair of heroes confronting a giant winged bull, clearly the Bull of Heaven. Decorations on a gold beaker—the Golden bowl of Hasanlu—have been identified as scenes from the Epic of Gilgamesh. In several images, the hero is depicted striding in a lion-skin kilt and carrying a bow, challenging Utnapishtim, and fighting Humbaba.

== Later influence ==
=== In antiquity ===
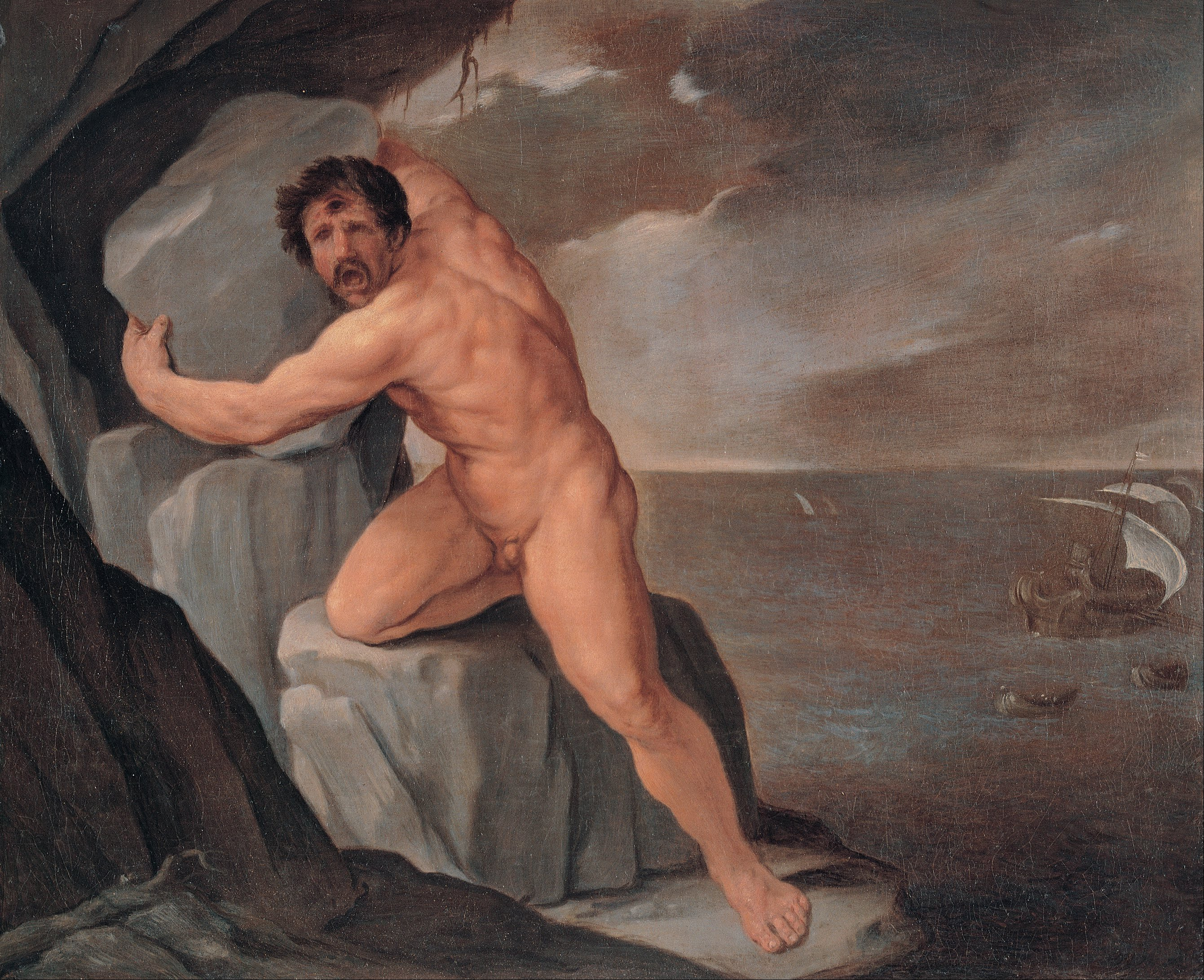
The episode involving Odysseus's confrontation with Polyphemus in the Odyssey, shown in this seventeenth-century painting by Guido Reni, bears similarities to Gilgamesh and Enkidu's battle with Humbaba in the Epic of Gilgamesh.

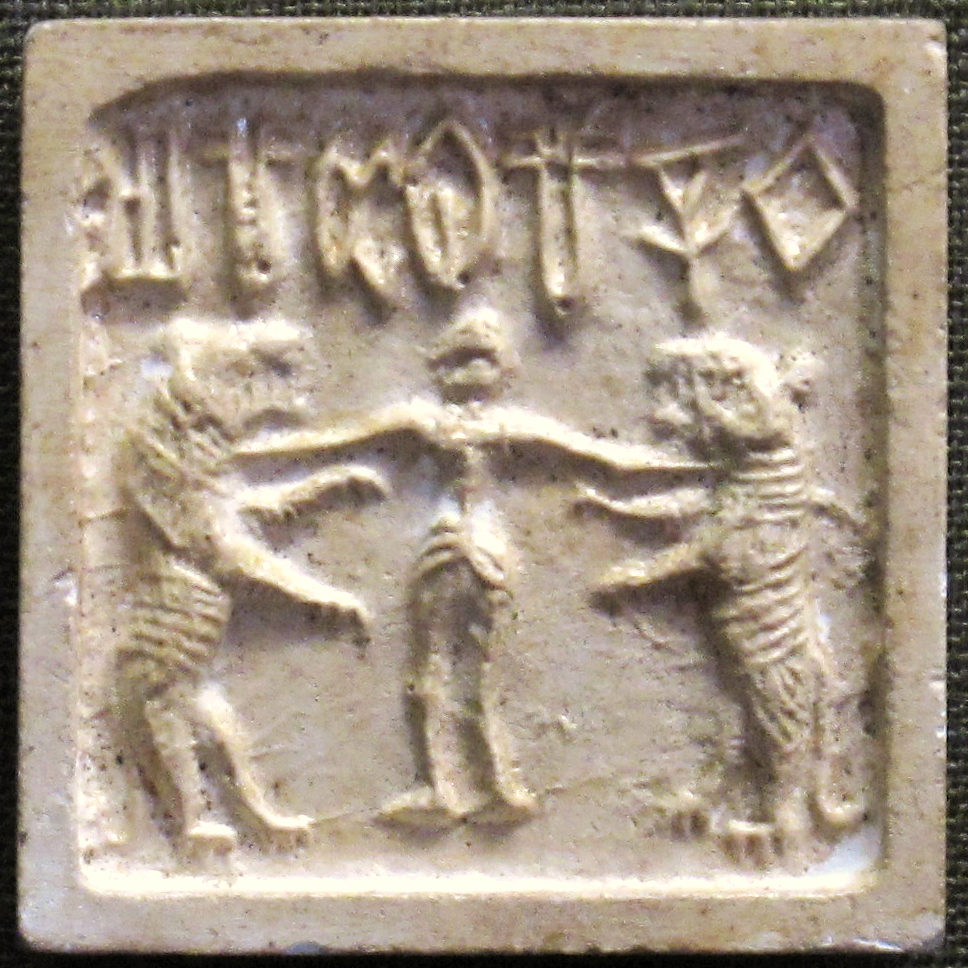
Indus valley civilization seal, with the Master of Animals motif of a man fighting two lions or tigers (2500–1500 BC), similar to the Sumerian "Gilgamesh" motif, an indicator of Indus-Mesopotamia relations.

The Epic of Gilgamesh exerted substantial influence on the Iliad and the Odyssey, the Homeric epic poems written in ancient Greek during the eighth century BC. According to classics scholar Barry B. Powell, early Greeks were probably exposed to and influenced by Mesopotamian oral traditions through their extensive connections to the civilizations of the ancient Near East. German classicist Walter Burkert observes that the scene in Tablet VI of the Epic of Gilgamesh in which Gilgamesh rejects Ishtar's advances and she complains before her mother Antu, but is mildly rebuked by her father Anu, is directly paralleled in Book V of the Iliad. In this scene, Aphrodite, the Greek analogue of Ishtar, is wounded by the hero Diomedes and flees to Mount Olympus, where she cries to her mother Dione and is mildly rebuked by her father Zeus.

Powell observes that the opening lines of the Odyssey seem to echo those of the Epic of Gilgamesh, both praising and pitying their heroes. The storyline of the Odyssey likewise bears many similarities to the Epic of Gilgamesh. Both Gilgamesh and Odysseus encounter a woman who can turn men into animals: Ishtar (for Gilgamesh) and Circe (for Odysseus). Odysseus blinds the giant cyclops Polyphemus, while Gilgamesh slays Humbaba. Both heroes visit the Underworld, and both find themselves unhappy while living in an otherworldly paradise in the company of a seductive sorceress: Siduri (for Gilgamesh) and Calypso (for Odysseus). Finally, both have a missed opportunity for immortality: Gilgamesh when he loses the plant, and Odysseus when he leaves Calypso's island.

In the Qumran scroll the Book of Giants (c. 100 BC) the names of Gilgamesh and Humbaba appear as two of the antediluvian giants, rendered (in consonantal form) as glgmš and ḩwbbyš. This same text was later used in the Middle East by the Manichaean sects, and the Arabic form Gilgamish/Jiljamish survives as the name of a demon according to the Egyptian cleric Al-Suyuti (c. 1500).

The story of Gilgamesh's birth is not recorded in any extant Sumerian or Akkadian text, but a version of it is described in De Natura Animalium (On the Nature of Animals) 12.21, a commonplace book written in Greek around 200 AD by the Hellenized Roman orator Aelian. According to Aelian, an oracle told King Seuechoros (Σευεχορος) of the Babylonians that his grandson Gilgamos would overthrow him. To prevent this, Seuechoros kept his only daughter under close guard at the Acropolis of Babylon, but she became pregnant nonetheless. Fearing the king's wrath, the guards hurled the infant off the top of a tall tower. An eagle rescued the boy in mid-flight and set him down in a distant orchard. The caretaker found the boy and raised him, naming him Gilgamos (Γίλγαμος). Eventually, Gilgamos returned to Babylon and overthrew his grandfather, proclaiming himself king. This birth narrative is in the same tradition as other Near Eastern birth legends, such as those of Sargon, Moses, and Cyrus. The Syriac writer Theodore Bar Konai (c. AD 600) also mentions a king Gligmos, Gmigmos or Gamigos as the last of a line of twelve kings contemporaneous with the patriarchs from Peleg to Abraham.

=== Modern rediscovery ===
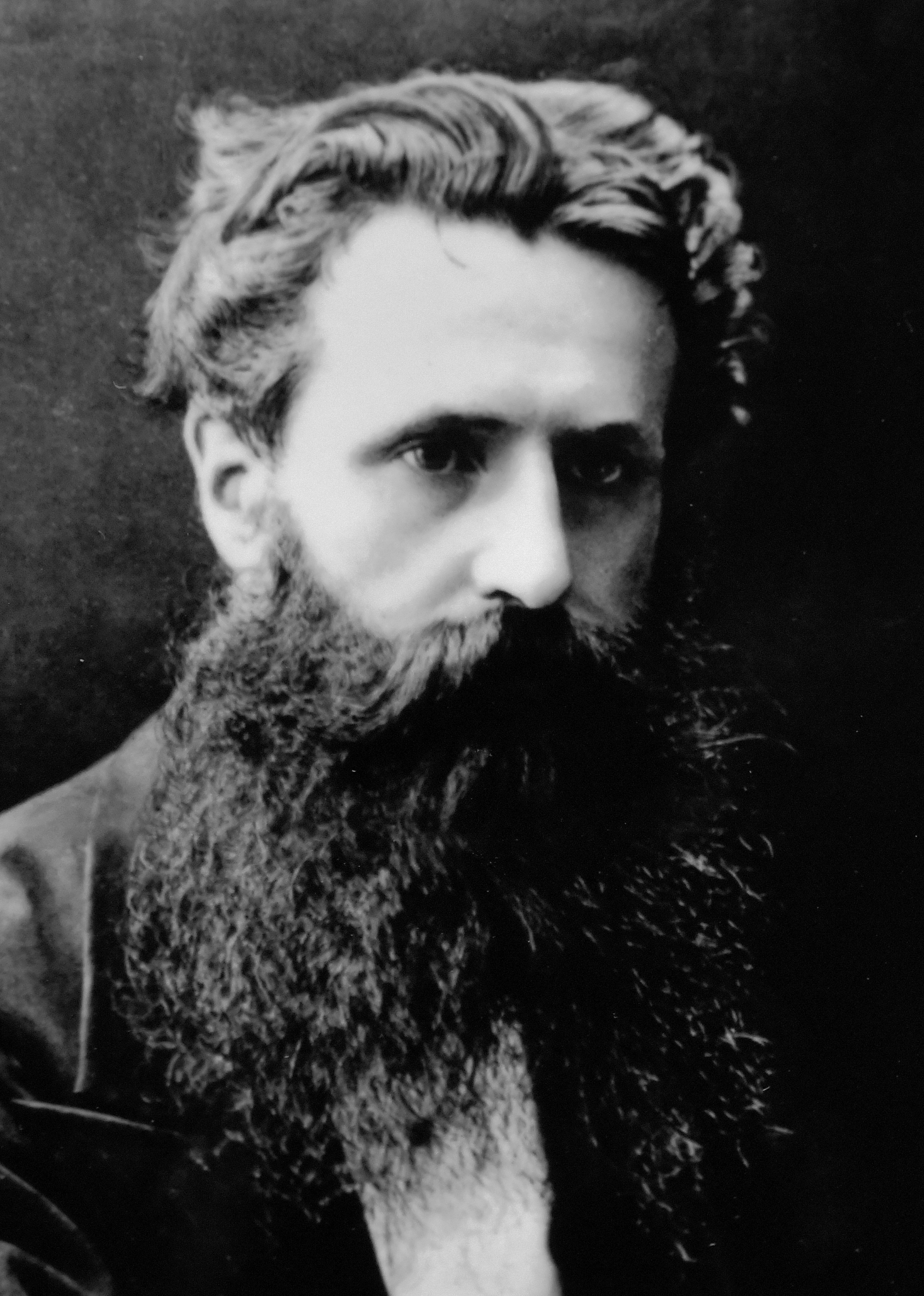
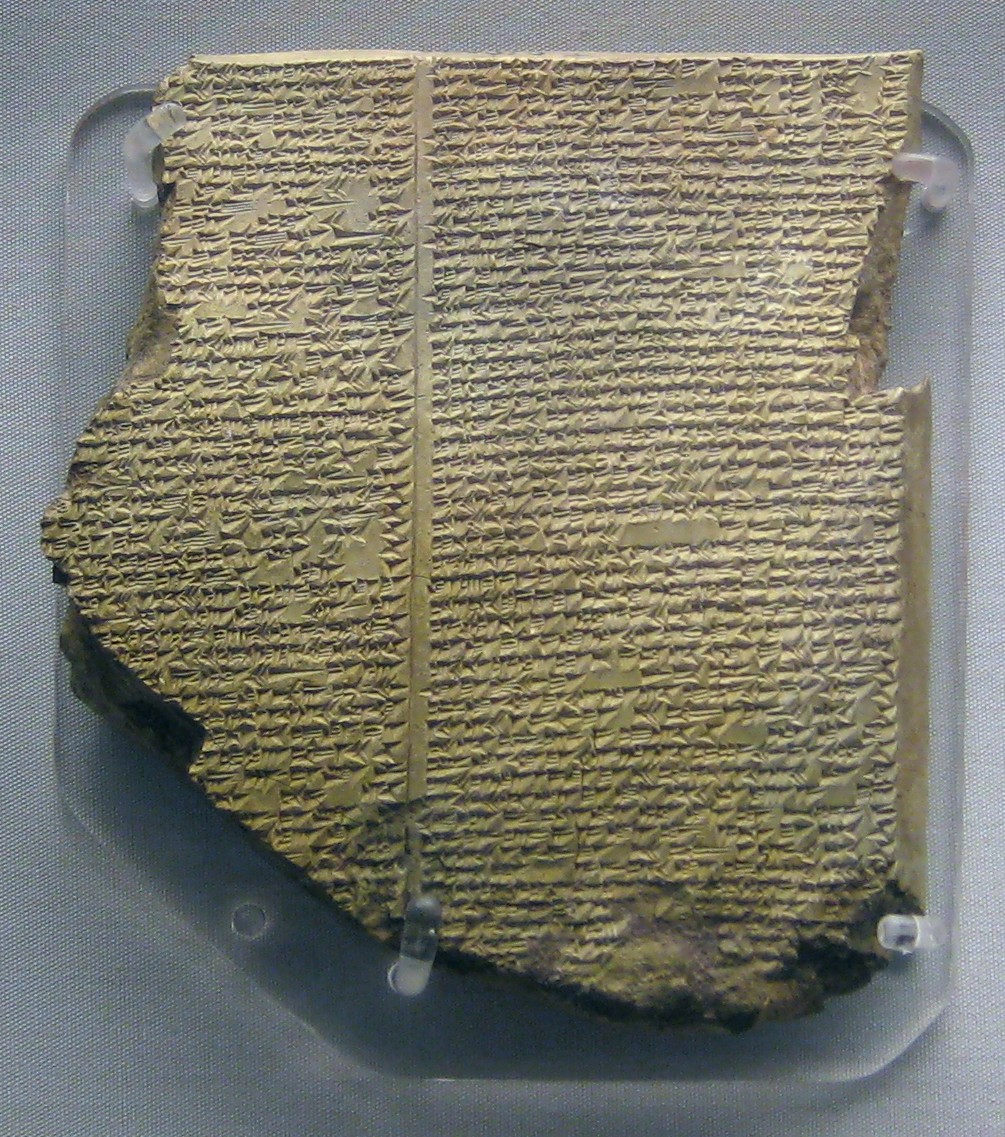
In 1880, the English Assyriologist George Smith (left) published a translation of Tablet XI of the Epic of Gilgamesh (right), containing the Flood myth, which attracted immediate scholarly attention and controversy due to its similarity to the Genesis flood narrative.

The Akkadian text of the Epic of Gilgamesh was first discovered in 1849 AD by the English archaeologist Austen Henry Layard in the Library of Ashurbanipal at Nineveh. Layard was seeking evidence to confirm the historicity of the events described in the Hebrew Bible, i.e. the Christian Old Testament, which was believed to contain the oldest texts in the world. Instead, his and later excavations unearthed much older Mesopotamian texts and showed that many of the stories in the Old Testament may be derived from earlier myths told throughout the ancient Near East. The first translation of the Epic of Gilgamesh was produced in the early 1870s by George Smith, a scholar at the British Museum, who published the Flood story from Tablet XI in 1880 under the title The Chaldean Account of Genesis. Gilgamesh's name was originally misread as Izdubar.

Early interest in the Epic of Gilgamesh was almost exclusively on account of the flood story from Tablet XI. It attracted enormous public attention and drew widespread scholarly controversy, while the rest of the epic was largely ignored. Most attention towards the Epic of Gilgamesh in the late nineteenth and early twentieth centuries came from German-speaking countries, where controversy raged over the relationship between Babel und Bibel ("Babylon and Bible").

In January 1902, the German Assyriologist Friedrich Delitzsch gave a lecture at the Sing-Akademie zu Berlin before the Kaiser and his wife, in which he argued that the Flood story in the Book of Genesis was directly copied from the Epic of Gilgamesh. Delitzsch's lecture was so controversial that, by September 1903, he had managed to collect thousands of articles and pamphlets criticizing this lecture about the Flood and another about the relationship between the Code of Hammurabi and the biblical Law of Moses. The Kaiser distanced himself from Delitzsch and his radical views and by the fall of 1904, Delitzsch was reduced to giving his third lecture in Cologne and Frankfurt am Main rather than in Berlin. The putative relationship between the Epic of Gilgamesh and the Hebrew Bible later became a major part of Delitzsch's argument in his 1920–21 book Die große Täuschung (The Great Deception) that the Hebrew Bible was irredeemably "contaminated" by Babylonian influence and that only by eliminating the human Old Testament entirely could Christians finally believe in the true, Aryan message of the New Testament.

=== Early modern interpretations ===
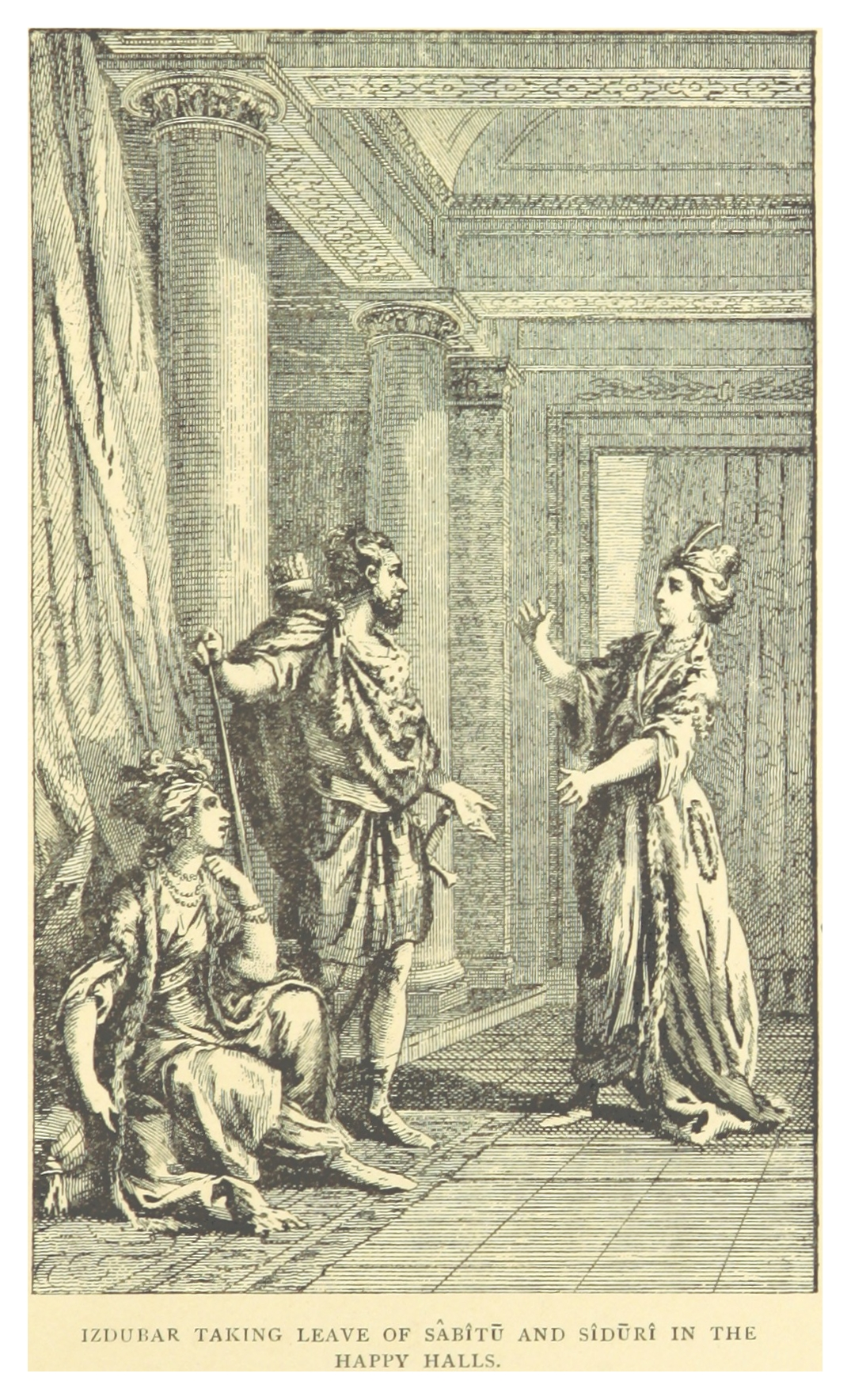
Illustration of Izdubar (Gilgamesh) in a scene from the book-length poem Ishtar and Izdubar (1884) by Leonidas Le Cenci Hamilton, the first modern literary adaptation of the Epic of Gilgamesh

The first modern literary adaptation of the Epic of Gilgamesh was Ishtar and Izdubar (1884) by Leonidas Le Cenci Hamilton, an American lawyer and businessman. Hamilton had rudimentary knowledge of Akkadian, which he had learned from Archibald Sayce's 1872 Assyrian Grammar for Comparative Purposes. Hamilton's book relied heavily on Smith's translation of the Epic of Gilgamesh, but also made major changes. For instance, Hamilton omitted the famous flood story entirely and instead focused on the romantic relationship between Ishtar and Gilgamesh. Ishtar and Izdubar expanded the original roughly 3,000 lines of the Epic of Gilgamesh to roughly 6,000 lines of rhyming couplets grouped into forty-eight cantos. Hamilton significantly altered most of the characters and introduced entirely new episodes not found in the original epic. Significantly influenced by Edward FitzGerald's Rubaiyat of Omar Khayyam and Edwin Arnold's The Light of Asia, Hamilton's characters dress more like nineteenth-century Turks than ancient Babylonians. Hamilton also changed the tone of the epic from the "grim realism" and "ironic tragedy" of the original to a "cheery optimism" filled with "the sweet strains of love and harmony".

In his 1904 book Das Alte Testament im Lichte des alten Orients, the German Assyriologist Alfred Jeremias equated Gilgamesh with the king Nimrod from the Book of Genesis and argued Gilgamesh's strength must come from his hair, like the hero Samson in the Book of Judges, and that he must have performed Twelve Labors like the hero Heracles in Greek mythology. In his 1906 book Das Gilgamesch-Epos in der Weltliteratur, the Orientalist Peter Jensen declared that the Epic of Gilgamesh was the source behind nearly all the stories in the Old Testament, arguing that Moses is "the Gilgamesh of Exodus who saves the children of Israel from precisely the same situation faced by the inhabitants of Erech at the beginning of the Babylonian epic." He then proceeded to argue that Abraham, Isaac, Samson, David, and various other biblical figures are all nothing more than exact copies of Gilgamesh. Finally, he declared that even Jesus is "nothing but an Israelite Gilgamesh. Nothing but an adjunct to Abraham, Moses, and countless other figures in the saga." This ideology became known as Panbabylonianism and was almost immediately rejected by mainstream scholars. The most stalwart critics of Panbabylonianism were those associated with the emerging Religionsgeschichtliche Schule. Hermann Gunkel dismissed most of Jensen's purported parallels between Gilgamesh and biblical figures as mere baseless sensationalism. He concluded that Jensen and other Assyriologists like him had failed to understand the complexities of Old Testament scholarship and had confused scholars with "conspicuous mistakes and remarkable aberrations".

In English-speaking countries, the prevailing scholarly interpretation during the early twentieth century was one originally proposed by Sir Henry Rawlinson, 1st Baronet, which held that Gilgamesh is a "solar hero", whose actions represent the movements of the sun, and that the twelve tablets of his epic represent the twelve signs of the Babylonian zodiac. The Austrian psychoanalyst Sigmund Freud, drawing on the theories of James George Frazer and Paul Ehrenreich, interpreted Gilgamesh and Eabani (the earlier misreading for Enkidu) as representing "man" and "crude sensuality" respectively. He compared them to other brother-figures in world mythology, remarking, "One is always weaker than the other and dies sooner. In Gilgamesh, this ages-old motif of the unequal pair of brothers served to represent the relationship between a man and his libido." He also saw Enkidu as representing the placenta, the "weaker twin" who dies shortly after birth. Freud's friend and pupil Carl Jung frequently discusses Gilgamesh in his early work Symbole der Wandlung (1911–1912). He, for instance, cites Ishtar's sexual attraction to Gilgamesh as an example of the mother's incestuous desire for her son, Humbaba as an example of an oppressive father-figure whom Gilgamesh must overcome, and Gilgamesh himself as an example of a man who forgets his dependence on the unconscious and is punished by the "gods", who represent it.

=== Modern interpretations and cultural significance ===
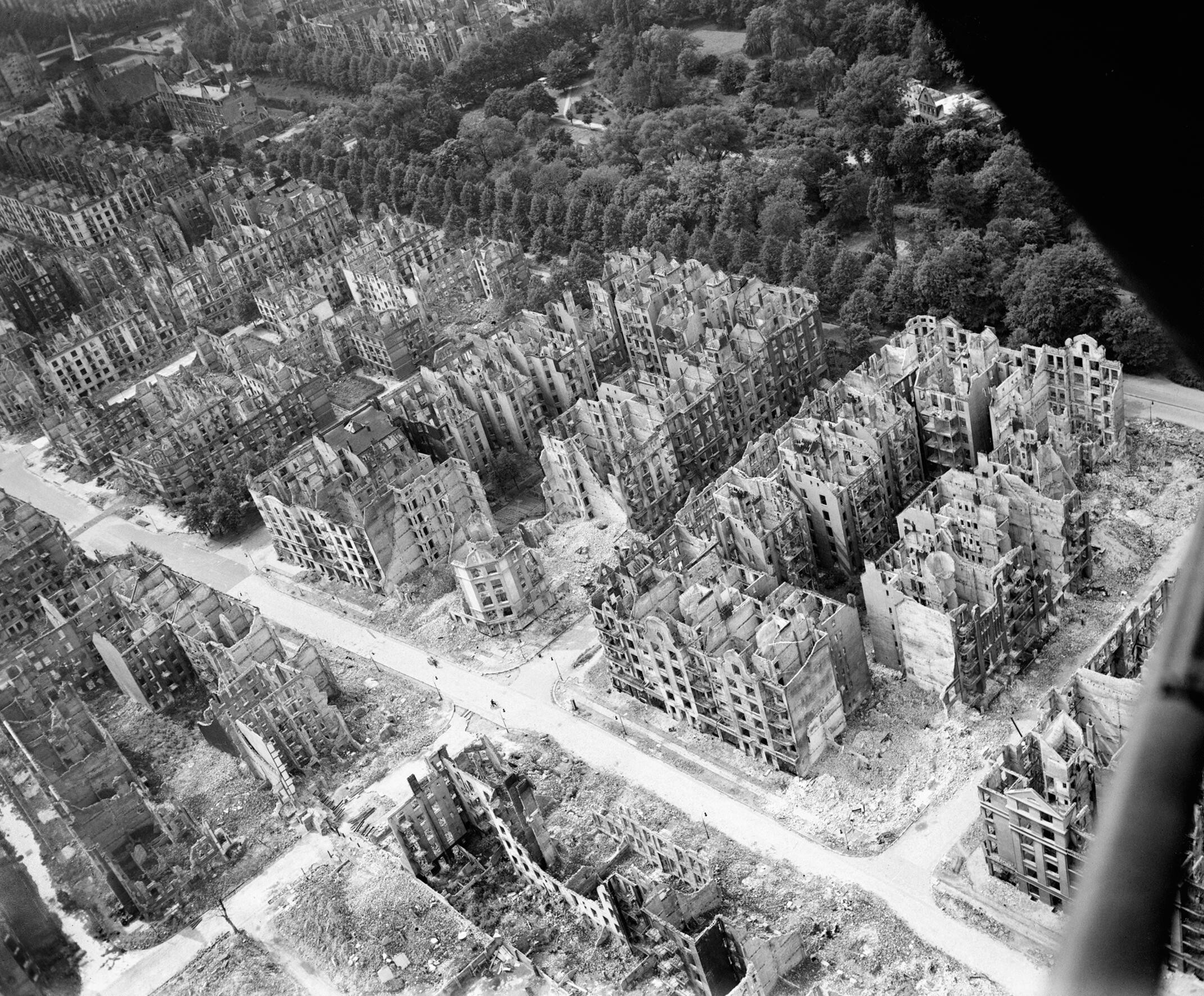
Existential angst during the aftermath of World War II significantly contributed to Gilgamesh's rise in popularity in the middle of the twentieth century. For instance, the German novelist Hermann Kasack used Enkidu's vision of the Underworld from the Epic of Gilgamesh as a metaphor for the bombed-out city of Hamburg (pictured above) in his 1947 novel Die Stadt hinter dem Strom.

In the years following World War II, Gilgamesh, formerly an obscure figure known only by a few scholars, gradually became increasingly popular with modern audiences. The Epic of Gilgamesh's existential themes made it particularly appealing to German authors in the years following the war. In his 1947 existentialist novel Die Stadt hinter dem Strom, the German novelist Hermann Kasack adapted elements of the epic into a metaphor for the aftermath of the destruction of World War II in Germany, portraying the bombed-out city of Hamburg as resembling the frightening Underworld seen by Enkidu in his dream. In Hans Henny Jahnn's magnum opus River Without Shores (1949–1950), the middle section of the trilogy centers around a composer whose twenty-year-long homoerotic relationship with a friend mirrors that of Gilgamesh with Enkidu and whose masterpiece turns out to be a symphony about Gilgamesh.

The Quest of Gilgamesh, a 1953 radio play by Douglas Geoffrey Bridson, helped popularize the epic in Britain. In the United States, Charles Olson praised the epic in his poems and essays and Gregory Corso believed that it contained ancient virtues capable of curing what he viewed as modern moral degeneracy. The 1966 postfigurative novel Gilgamesch by Guido Bachmann became a classic of German "queer literature" and set a decades-long international literary trend of portraying Gilgamesh and Enkidu as homosexual lovers. This trend proved so popular that the Epic of Gilgamesh itself is included in The Columbia Anthology of Gay Literature (1998) as a major early work of that genre. In the 1970s and 1980s, feminist literary critics analyzed the Epic of Gilgamesh as showing evidence for a transition from the original matriarchy of all humanity to modern patriarchy. As the Green Movement expanded in Europe, Gilgamesh's story began to be seen through an environmentalist lens, with Enkidu's death symbolizing man's separation from nature.

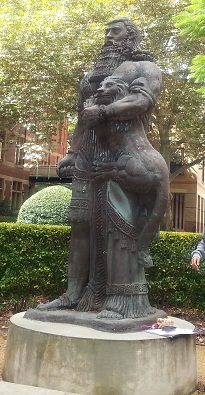
A modern statue of Gilgamesh stands at the University of Sydney.

Theodore Ziolkowski, a scholar of modern literature, states that "unlike most other figures from myth, literature, and history, Gilgamesh has established himself as an autonomous entity or simply a name, often independent of the epic context in which he originally became known. (As analogous examples, one might think, for instance, of the Minotaur or Frankenstein's monster.)" The Epic of Gilgamesh has been translated into many major world languages and has become a staple of American world literature classes. Many contemporary authors and novelists have drawn inspiration from it, including an American avant-garde theater collective called "The Gilgamesh Group" and Joan London in her novel Gilgamesh (2001). The Great American Novel (1973) by Philip Roth features a character named "Gil Gamesh", who is the star pitcher of a fictional 1930s baseball team called the "Patriot League".

Starting in the late twentieth century, the Epic of Gilgamesh began to be read again in Iraq. Saddam Hussein, the former President of Iraq, had a lifelong fascination with Gilgamesh. Saddam's first novel Zabibah and the King (2000) is an allegory for the Gulf War set in ancient Assyria that blends elements of the Epic of Gilgamesh and the One Thousand and One Nights. Like Gilgamesh, the king at the beginning of the novel is a brutal tyrant who misuses his power and oppresses his people, but, through the aid of a commoner woman named Zabibah, he grows into a more just ruler. When the United States tried to pressure Saddam to step down in February 2003, Saddam gave a speech to a group of his generals, posing the idea in a positive light by comparing himself to the epic hero.

Scholars like Susan Ackerman and Wayne R. Dynes have noted that the language used to describe Gilgamesh's relationship with Enkidu seems to have homoerotic implications. Ackerman notes that, when Gilgamesh veils Enkidu's body, Enkidu is compared to a "bride". Ackerman states, "that Gilgamesh, according to both versions, will love Enkidu 'like a wife' may further imply sexual intercourse."

In 2000, a modern statue of Gilgamesh by the Assyrian sculptor Lewis Batros was unveiled at the University of Sydney in Australia.

The Australian psychedelic rock band King Gizzard & the Lizard Wizard recorded a song titled "Gilgamesh" as the fifth track of their October 2023 album The Silver Cord, with references to the epic in the song's lyrics.

== Genealogy of Gilgamesh ==
An
Ninḫursaĝ | Enki born to Namma | Ninkikurga born to Namma | Nisaba born to Uraš | Ḫaya
Ninsar | Ninlil | Enlil
Ninkurra | Ningal maybe daughter of Enlil | Nanna | Nergal maybe son of Enki | Ninurta maybe born to Ninḫursaĝ | Baba born to Uraš
Uttu | Inanna possibly also the daughter of Enki, of Enlil, or of An | Dumuzid maybe son of Enki | Utu | Ninkigal married Nergal
Meškiaĝĝašer | Lugalbanda | Ninsumun
Enmerkar | Gilgāmeš
Urnungal

== See also ==
- Atra-Hasis
- Ziusudra
- Enūma Eliš

== Bibliography ==
- Ackerman, Susan (2005). When Heroes Love: The Ambiguity of Eros in the Stories of Gilgamesh and David. New York City: Columbia University Press. ISBN 978-0-231-50725-7.
- Anderson, Graham (2000). Fairytale in the Ancient World. Routledge. pp. 127–131. ISBN 978-0-415-23702-4.
- Black, Jeremy; Green, Anthony (1992). Gods, Demons and Symbols of Ancient Mesopotamia: An Illustrated Dictionary. Austin: University of Texas Press. pp. 166–168. ISBN 978-0-7141-1705-8.
- Burkert, Walter (2005). "Chapter Twenty: Near Eastern Connections". In Foley, John Miles (ed.). A Companion to Ancient Epic. New York City and London: Blackwell Publishing. ISBN 978-1-4051-0524-8.
- Dalley, Stephanie (1989). Myths from Mesopotamia: Creation, the Flood, Gilgamesh, and Others. Oxford: Oxford University Press. ISBN 978-0-19-283589-5.
- Damrosch, David (2006). The Buried Book: The Loss and Rediscovery of the Great Epic of Gilgamesh. New York City: Henry Holt and Company. ISBN 978-0-8050-8029-2.
- Delorme, Jean (1981) [1964]. "The Ancient World". In Dunan, Marcel; Bowle, John (eds.). The Larousse Encyclopedia of Ancient and Medieval History. New York City: Excaliber Books. ISBN 978-0-89673-083-0.
- Fontenrose, Joseph Eddy (1980) [1959]. Python: A Study of Delphic Myth and Its Origins. Berkeley, Los Angeles, and London: The University of California Press. ISBN 978-0-520-04106-6.
- George, Andrew R. (2003a) [1999, 2000]. The Epic of Gilgamesh: The Babylonian Epic Poem and Other Texts in Akkadian and Sumerian. Penguin Classics (Third ed.). London: Penguin Books. ISBN 978-0-14-044919-8. OCLC 901129328.
- George, Andrew R. (2003b). The Babylonian Gilgamesh Epic: Introduction, Critical Edition and Cuneiform Texts. Vol. 1. Oxford University Press.
- George, Andrew R. (2010) [2003]. The Babylonian Gilgamesh Epic – Introduction, Critical Edition and Cuneiform Texts (in English and Akkadian). Vol. 1, 2 (reprint ed.). Oxford: Oxford University Press. p. 163. ISBN 978-0-19814922-4. OCLC 819941336.
- Kramer, S.N. (1961). Sumerian mythology: a study of spiritual and literary achievement in the third millennium B.C. Harper torchbooks. The Academy library, TB1055. Harper.
- Kramer, Samuel Noah (1963). The Sumerians: Their History, Culture, and Character. University of Chicago Press.
- Marchesi, Gianni (2004). "Who Was Buried in the Royal Tombs of Ur? The Epigraphic and Textual Data". Orientalia. 73 (2): 153–197. ISSN 0030-5367. JSTOR 43076896.
- Mark, Joshua J. (29 March 2018). "Gilgamesh". World History Encyclopedia.
- Powell, Barry B. (2012) [2004], "Gilgamesh: Heroic Myth", Classical Myth (Seventh ed.), London: Pearson, pp. 336–350, ISBN 978-0-205-17607-6
- Pryke, Louise M. (2017). Ishtar. Routledge. ISBN 978-1-315-71632-9.
- Rybka, F. James (2011). "The Epic of Gilgamesh". Bohuslav Martinu: The Compulsion to Compose. Lanham, MD: Scarecrow Press. ISBN 978-0-8108-7762-7.
- Tigay, Jeffrey H. (2002) [1982]. The Evolution of the Gilgamesh Epic. Wauconda, IL: Bolchazzy-Carucci Publishers. ISBN 978-0-86516-546-5.
- Stone, Damien (July 2012). Turner, Michael (ed.). "The Epic of Gilgamesh: Statue brings ancient tale to life" (PDF). MUSE. No. 2. p. 28. Archived from the original (PDF) on 29 May 2018.
- West, M. L. (1997). The East Face of Helicon: West Asiatic Elements in Greek Poetry and Myth. Oxford, England: Clarendon Press. ISBN 978-0-19-815221-7.
- Wolkstein, Diane; Kramer, Samuel Noah (1983). Inanna: Queen of Heaven and Earth: Her Stories and Hymns from Sumer. New York City, New York: Harper&Row. ISBN 978-0-06-090854-6.
- Ziolkowski, Theodore (1 November 2011). "Gilgamesh: An Epic Obsession". Berfrois. Archived from the original on 4 November 2011.
- Ziolkowski, Theodore (2012). Gilgamesh among Us: Modern Encounters with the Ancient Epic. Ithaca, NY and London: Cornell University Press. ISBN 978-0-8014-5035-8.

Regnal titles
| Preceded by Dumuzid the Fisherman | En of Uruk c. 2900–2700 BC | Succeeded by Ur-Nungal |
