= Devil's Dance =

Devil's Dance may refer to:

- Devil's Dance, novel by Saddam Hussein, see Saddam Hussein's novels
- "Devil's Dance", song by Metallica from Reload
