= Begone, Demons =

Begone, Demons (Arabic: اخرج منها يا ملعون ukhruj minhā yā malʿūn; also translated as Get Out You Damned, or Get Out of Here, Curse You!) is Saddam Hussein's fourth and last novel. It is a fictional novel, with political metaphor. It is thought to have been written in anticipation of the 2003 Iraq War in 2002 or 2003. It was not yet published before the 2003 invasion of Iraq.

== Overview ==
Begone, Demons is a fictional story of a tribe living along the Euphrates River for more than 1,500 years, where the tribe is invaded by another, but emerges victorious. The main part of the book focuses on three men: Ishaaq, Yousef, and Mahmud, who grew up under their grandfather. Ishaq is the main antagonist in the book, while the other two, are ideal heroes and the protagonists of the story. Later on in the story, Ishaaq leaves and moves to a country west of the Dead Sea. There he forms an alliance with a greedy governor from Rome, making a deal which made both of them rich at the expense of the local population. To keep their riches, they eventually build two tall buildings.

Later in the story, Ishaaq & his Roman associate are attacked by Yousef & Mahmoud while they were at one of their buildings, with Yousef & Mahmoud embracing martyrdom by putting "a day on fire".

== Publication ==
The book was published in Tokyo by a Japanese publisher, Tokuma Shoten Publishing, in 2006 under the title Devil's Dance ("Akuma no Dance"). 8,000 copies were printed, at 256 pages.

It was translated into Turkish by Humam Khalil Abu-Mulal al-Balawi.

Raghad Hussein had tried to publish the novel in Jordan, and planned to print 100 thousand copies, until the government prevented the publication.

In 2007 the novel was translated into Russian and published in Saint Petersburg by Amfora Publishing House. 5,000 copies were printed, at 206 pages. The chief editor of the publishing house Vadim Nazarov said that the novel's publication was "an ideological initiative" and "a response to pain". He explained that "when Serbian houses were being bombed, we published Serbian novels. Now we publish Saddam Hussein's book. When he was the leader of Iraq, there was more discipline in this country".

== See also ==
- Saddam Hussein's novels
