= The Fortified Castle =

Book of Saddam Hussein

The Fortified Castle (Arabic: القلعة الحصينة Al-Qala-ah Al-Hasinah) is Saddam Hussein's third of four novels. The book involves political metaphor. It is 713 pages and was published in 2001. It is another allegorical work. It concerns the delayed wedding of the Iraqi hero, who fought in the war against Iran, to a Kurdish girl.

There are three characters: the two brothers Sabah and Mahmud, from rural area from the west bank of the Tigris River from a farming family coming, and a young woman Shatrin from Suleimaniya. They all go into the same university in Baghdad.

Sabah is a war hero from the days of the Battle of New Qadisiyya (Iran–Iraq War), during which he was wounded in the leg and taken prisoner of war in Iran, from which he finally manage to escape with a few friends.

Shatrin from Suleimaniya is the representative for the Kurds.

The power of the "fortified castle" (a reference to Iraq) lies in its unity; despite proposals to divide the property, the hero's mother refuses. She also states that it cannot be purchased with money: "Only those who give it their blood and defend it are its rightful owners."

== See also ==
- Saddam Hussein's novels
