= Statue of Gilgamesh, University of Sydney =

Statue in the University of Sydney

Gilgamesh Statue
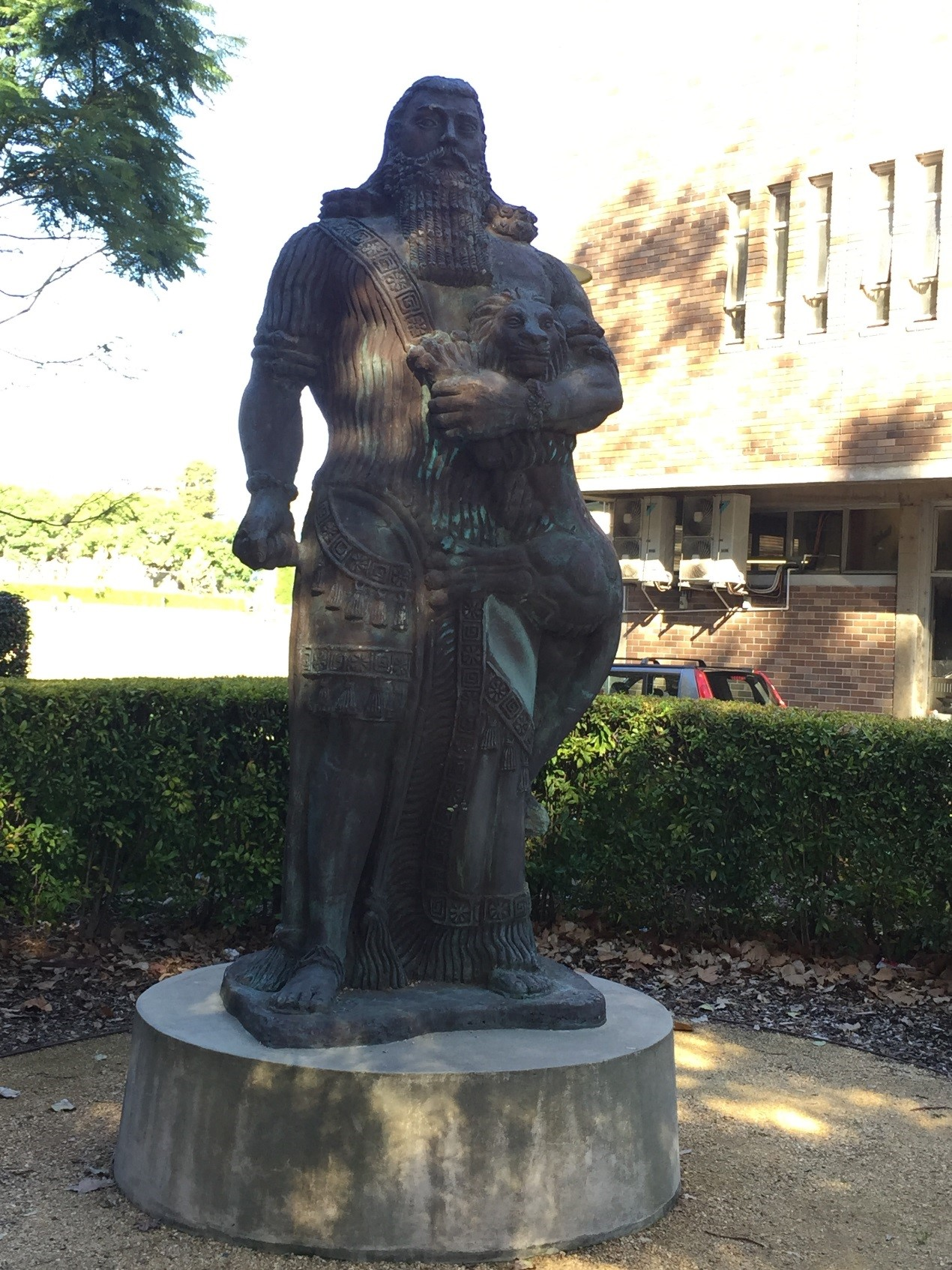
- Gilgamesh statue at the University of Sydney
- Artist: Lewis Batros
- Year: 2000
- Dimensions: 2.5 m (98 in)
- Condition: Good
- Location: University of Sydney; 33.887237°S 151.186146°E

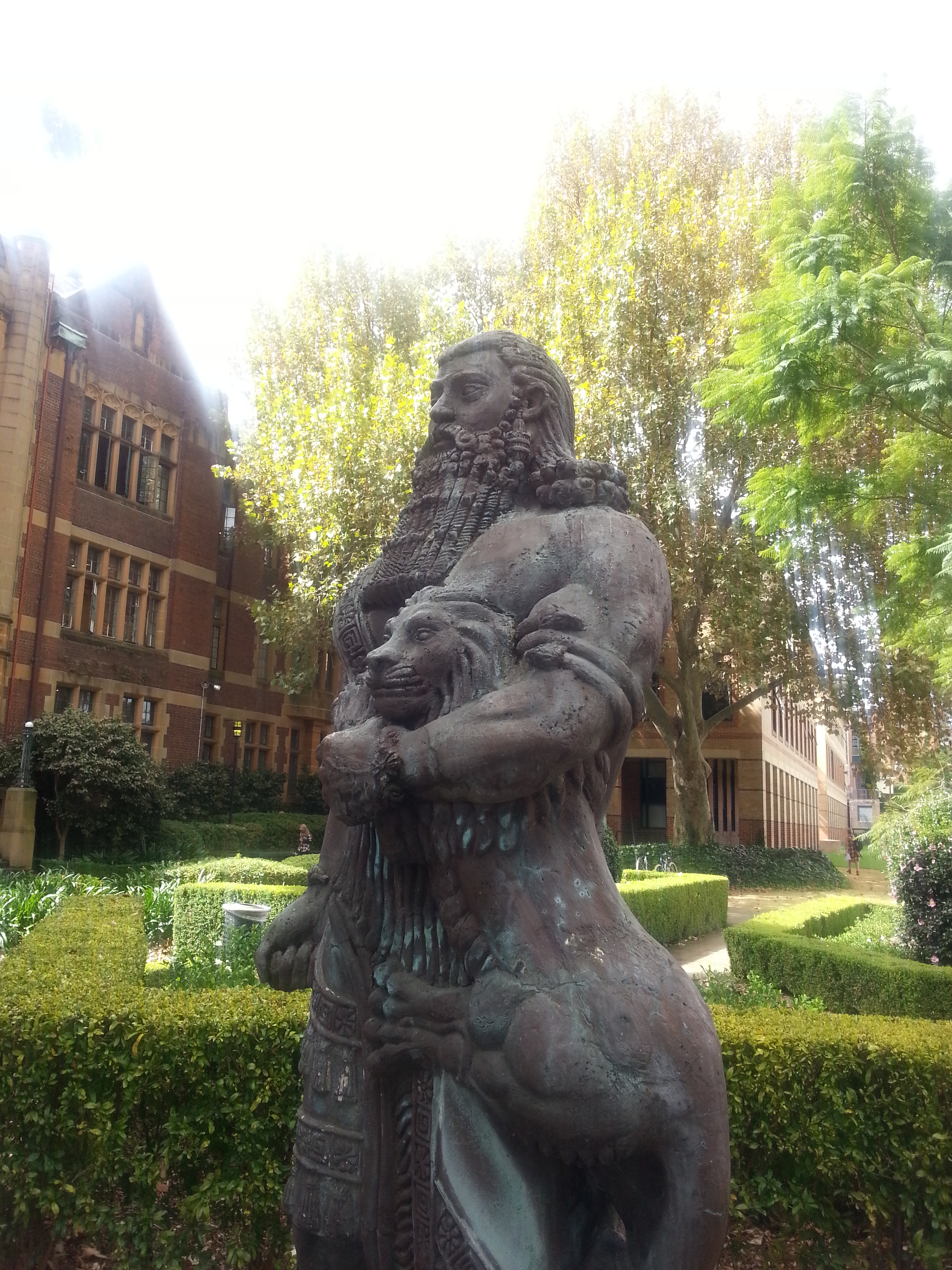
Waist up view of Gilgamesh the side

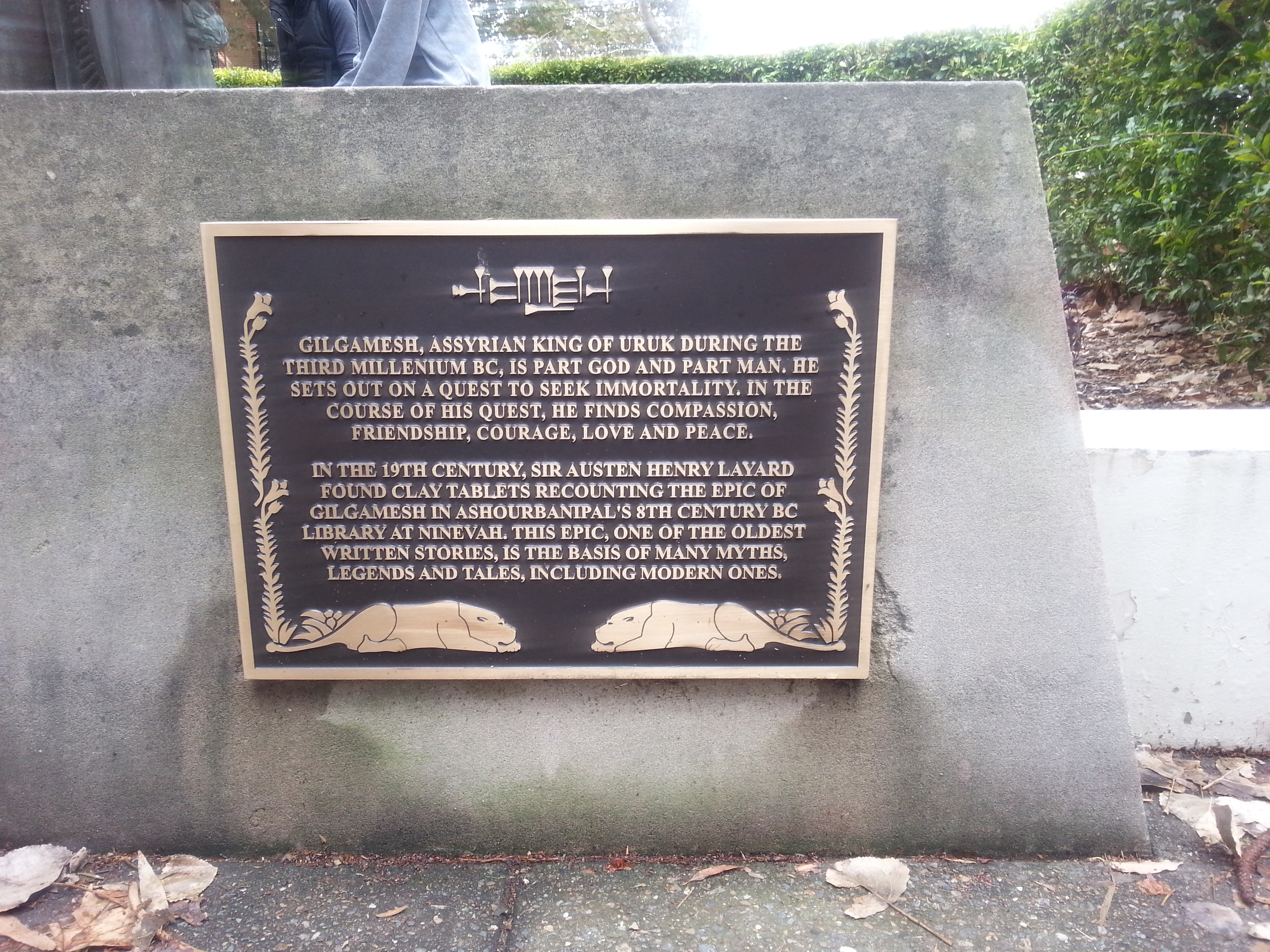
Inscription of the story of Gilgamesh on the statue

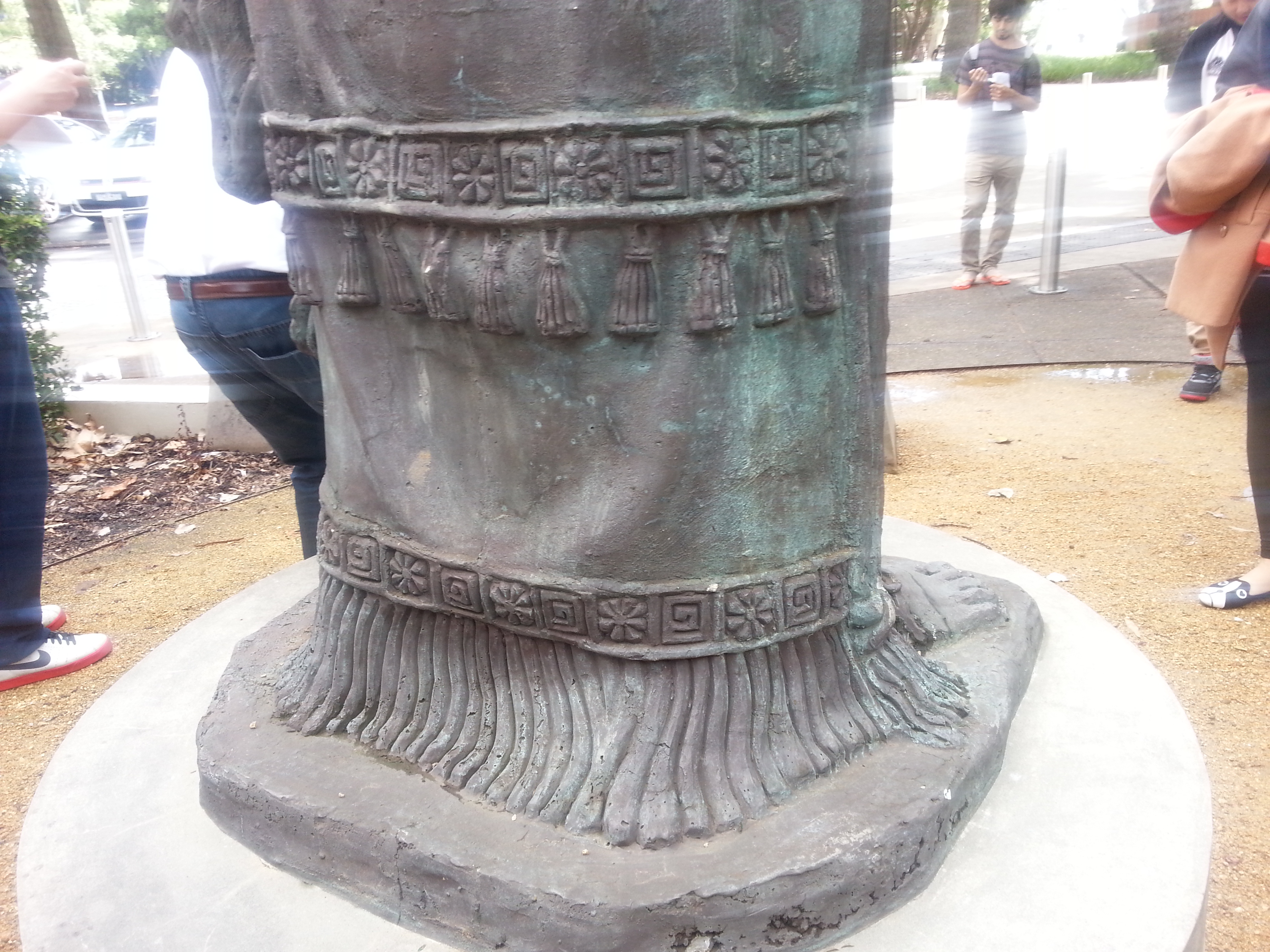
Gilgamesh statue back outfit details

The Statue of Gilgamesh at the University of Sydney, Camperdown, was created by Assyrian-Australian artist Lewis Batros on commission from the Assyrian community, and unveiled in 2000. The 2.5m concrete statue depicts Gilgamesh, an ancient Sumerian king of the city-state of Uruk whose legendary exploits are told in the Epic of Gilgamesh, an Akkadian epic poem written during the late second millennium BC, based on much earlier material.

The Gilgamesh Cultural Centre, on behalf of the Assyrian community, presented the statue to the University to commemorate its sesquicentenary. The statue was unveiled by Dame Leonie Kramer, A.C., and D.B.E., on 15 October 2000. It is located in the Camperdown/Darlington Campus of the University of Sydney between the Old Teachers College Building and the Women's Sports Centre, facing towards the Charles Perkins Centre.

== History ==
Gilgamesh was a king of Uruk in the land of Sumer, Mesopotamia. Gilgamesh is described as a demigod of superhuman strength, as he was two-thirds God from his mother, Ninsun, and one-third human from his father, the former king, Lugalbunda. Gilgamesh built the city walls of Uruk to defend his people. Gilgamesh fought the demon Humbaba (or Huwawa), along with wild man Enkidu and brought his head back to Uruk on a raft. The pair also defeated the Bull of Heaven sent by the furious goddess Ishtar. These conquered beasts can be linked to the creature in the statue as a representation of Gilgamesh's strength and power. Gilgamesh is seen as a worldly-wise, cultured king and protector who is at the centre of human society. The statue was erected to celebrate the might and power of Gilgamesh and commemorate his achievements as a protector and king.

== Inscription ==
Situated with the Statue of Gilgamesh is a bronze plaque with an inscription of the story of Gilgamesh, which reads:

Gilgamesh, Assyrian King of Uruk during the third millennium BC, is part god and part man. He sets out on a quest to seek immortality. In the course of his quest, he finds compassion, friendship, courage, love and peace. In the 19th century, Sir Austen Henry Layard found clay tablets recounting The Epic of Gilgamesh in Ashourbanipal's 8th century BC library at Nineveh. This epic, one of the oldest written stories, is the basis of many myths, legends and tales, including modern ones.

== Artist ==
The statue was sculpted by Lewis Batros, whose other sculptures are exhibited in Fairfield and Sydney Olympic Park in Australia, in Moscow, and in the US. He has done many Assyrian-inspired works, some of which have been controversial, including a 4.5-metre-high (15 ft) monument to Assyrian victims of genocide commissioned by Fairfield council. He obtained a degree in fine art in 1986 and migrated to Australia in 1990. Many of Batros' works take inspiration from Assyrian heritage, stories, art and culture.
