= Susan Ackerman (biblical scholar) =

American Hebrew Bible scholar

Susan Ackerman (born September 24, 1958) is an American Hebrew Bible scholar known for writing about biblical women.

Ackerman majored in religion at Dartmouth College (A.B., 1980) and Harvard University (M.T.S., 1982; Ph.D. 1987). Her dissertation was entitled Syncretism in Israel as Reflected in Sixth-Century Prophetic Texts. She later taught at University of Arizona and Winthrop College.

In 1990, Ackerman joined Dartmouth's faculty. There, she was a Preston H. Kelsey Professor of Religion; a Professor of Women's, Gender, and Sexuality Studies; and a Professor of Jewish Studies. She specialized in the religion of ancient Israel and its neighbors (Mesopotamia, Egypt, and Canaan), especially women's religious history.

She was president of the American Society of Overseas Research from 2014 to 2019.

In 2024, Ackerman retired from teaching and remained in Hanover, New Hampshire, to complete Maturity, Marriage, Motherhood, Mortality, a book on women's rituals in ancient Israel. Her parents George and Peggy Ackerman died during her work on the book. She published the book in 2025 and dedicated it to her sister Laura.

== Awards ==
- Dartmouth Dean of Faculty Award for Exceptional Service (2023)

== Bibliography ==
=== Books ===
- Under Every Green Tree: Popular Religion in Sixth-Century Judah (Scholars Press, 1992)
- Warrior, Dancer, Seductress, Queen: Women in Judges and Biblical Israel (Doubleday, 1998)
- When Heroes Love: The Ambiguity of Eros in the Stories of Gilgamesh and David (Columbia University Press, 2005)
- Celebrate Her for the Fruit of Her Hands: Essays in Honor of Carol L. Meyers (Eisenbrauns, 2015), with Charles E. Carter and Beth Alpert Nakhai
- Gods, Goddesses, and the Woman Who Serve Them (William B. Eerdmans Publishing Company, 2022)
- Women and the Religion of Ancient Israel (Yale University Press, 2022)
- Maturity, Marriage, Motherhood, Mortality: Women's Life-Cycle Ritual in Ancient Israel (Oxford University Press, 2025)

=== Chapters ===
- "The Blind, the Lame, and the Barren Shall Not Come into the House." Chapter 2, Disability Studies and Biblical Literature (edited by Candida Moss and Jeremy Schipper, 2011)
- "'I have hired you with my Son's Mandrakes': Women's reproductive magic in ancient Israel." Chapter 1, Sex in Antiquity: Exploring Gender and Sexuality in the Ancient World (edited by Mark Masterson, Nancy Sorkin Rabinowitz, and James Robson, 2015)

=== Articles ===
- "What if Judges had been written by a Philistine?" Biblical Interpretation, Vol. 8, No. 1-2 (January 2000)
- "Why Is Miriam Also Among the Prophets? (And Is Zipporah Among The Priests?)." Journal of Biblical Literature, Vol. 121, No. 1 (Spring 2002)
- "Digging up Deborah: Recent Hebrew Bible Scholarship on Gender and the Contribution of Archaeology." Near Eastern Archaeology, Vol. 66, No. 4 (December 2003)
