= Saddam Hussein's novels =

List of novels authored by Saddam Hussein

Saddam Hussein, the fifth President of Iraq, wrote four novels and a number of poems. The first two books (Zabibah and the King and The Fortified Castle) were "Written by He Who Wrote It", a traditional way in Arabic writing to preserve anonymity.

== Zabibah and the King ==
Zabibah and the King (Arabic: زبيبة والملك Zabībah wal-Malik), also transliterated Zabiba and the King, written in 2000, is a novel that the CIA believes was ghost written for Saddam Hussein. The plot is a love story about a powerful ruler of medieval Iraq and a beautiful commoner girl named Zabibah. Zabibah's husband is a cruel and unloving man who rapes her. The book is set in 7th- or 8th-century Tikrit, Hussein's home town. The book is intended to be seen as an allegory, with Zabibah representing the people of Iraq, her husband representing the United States, and the ruler representing Saddam Hussein himself. The book was believed to be the subject of the 2012 movie The Dictator. However, this turned out not to be true.

== The Fortified Castle ==
The Fortified Castle (Arabic: القلعة الحصينة al-Qala'ah al-Haṣīnah) is a 713-page novel published in 2001. It is another allegorical work. It concerns the delayed wedding of the Iraqi hero, who fought in the war against Iran, to a Kurdish girl.

There are three characters: the two brothers Sabah and Mahmud, from a rural area on the west bank of the Tigris River who come from a farming family, and a young woman, Shatrin, from Suleimaniya. They all go to the same university in Baghdad.

Sabah is a war hero from the days of the Battle of New Qadisiyya (Iran–Iraq War), during which he was wounded in the leg and taken prisoner of war in Iran, from which he finally manages to escape with a few friends.

The power of the "fortified castle" (a reference to Iraq) lies in its unity; despite proposals to divide the property, the hero's mother refuses. She also states that it cannot be purchased with money: "Only those who give it their blood and defend it are its rightful owners."

== Men and the City ==
Men and the City (Arabic: رجال والمدينة Rijāl wal-Madīnah) concerns the rise of the Ba'ath Party in Tikrit.

== Begone, Demons ==
Begone, Demons, also translated as Get Out, You Damned or Get Out of Here, Curse You! (Arabic: اخرج منها يا ملعون Uḵruj Minhā yā Mal'ūn), is Saddam Hussein's fourth and last novel, allegedly finished the day before U.S. forces invaded. The novel describes, through biblical metaphor, a Zionist-Christian conspiracy against Arabs and Muslims. An Arab army eventually thwarts the conspiracy by invading their enemy's land and destroying two massive towers, as a reference to the September 11 attacks. The characters include the narrator, Abraham, named for the patriarch in Jewish, Christian and Muslim traditions, and his grandchildren, three cousins named Ezekiel, Youssef and Mahmoud, who represent Jews, Christians and Muslims respectively.

The book was published in Tokyo by a Japanese publisher, Tokuma Shoten Publishing, in 2006 under the title Devil's Dance. A total of eight thousand copies were printed of the 256-page novel.

It was translated into Turkish by Humam Khalil Abu-Mulal al-Balawi.

Raghad Hussein had tried to publish the novel in Jordan, and planned to print 100 thousand copies, until the government prevented the publication.

In 2007, the novel was translated into Russian and published in Saint Petersburg by the Amfora Publishing House. 5,000 copies of 206 pages were printed. The chief editor of the publishing house Vadim Nazarov said that the novel's publication was "an ideological initiative" and "a response to pain". He explained that "when Serbian houses were being bombed, we published Serbian novels. Now we publish Saddam Hussein's book. When he was the leader of Iraq, there was more discipline in this country".

It has not been translated or sold in any other languages.

== See also ==
- Culture of Iraq
