= List of characters in Epic of Gilgamesh =

This article is a list of characters appearing in the Epic of Gilgamesh, an ancient Mesopotamian epic poem. Its standard version was most likely compiled by Sîn-lēqi-unninni in the Kassite period. Older versions are already known from the Old Babylonian period. Hittite and Hurrian adaptations have been discovered too. However, modern translations and adaptations generally depend on the standard Babylonian edition attributed to Sîn-lēqi-unninni.

== Main characters ==
Name	Image	Overview
Gilgamesh		Gilgamesh (originally Bilgames) is the protagonist of the epic. He is described as two thirds god and one third man and as the king of Uruk. Despite possessing traits associated with positive portrayals of rulers in Mesopotamian tradition, including beauty and martial prowess, in the initial section of the story he is a tyrannical ruler who terrorizes the inhabitants of Uruk. He is eventually confronted on their behalf of Enkidu. The two become close friends and possibly lovers. According to Andrew R. George, evidence for the latter interpretation is present both the epic itself and in the earlier poem Death of Gilgamesh. After introducing Enkidu to his mother, Ninsun, Gilgamesh decides to embark on an expedition to the cedar forest to acquire valuable wood. He defeats its guardian Humbaba, and later also triumphs over the Bull of Heaven, sent to Uruk by Ishtar. Enkidu dies in the aftermath of these events, and Gilgamesh prepares a funeral for him. These events make him realize his own mortality, and he embarks on a quest to find Utnapishtim. He travels underneath the mountain of sunrise, Mashu, and with the guidance of Siduri eventually crosses the cosmic ocean separating Utnapishtim's domain from earth. However, after being tested by him he realizes that he has no hope of becoming immortal. He is offered a chance to obtain a plant which would rejuvenate him as a reward for his deeds, but it is ultimately stolen from him by a snake. He eventually returns to Uruk, where he possibly accepts that while his quest did not bring him immortality, he will be renowned due to constructing the city's walls. A real king named Gilgamesh likely did rule over Uruk at some point, but Gilgamesh as a protagonist of the epic was a fictional character whose deeds did not reflect historical reality. As a minor deity and legendary hero Gilgamesh is first attested in sources from the Early Dynastic period (middle of the third millennium BCE), including an entry in a god list from Fara and accounts of offerings made to him in Lagash. He appears in numerous god lists, including the Weidner god list and An = Anum. However, there is no evidence he was worshiped past the Old Babylonian period with the exception of a Middle Babylonian reference to rituals in his honor held in Abu, the fifth month of the Babylonian calendar. Additionally, little, if any evidence for any veneration of him in Uruk is available. After cuneiform ceased to be used, echoes of traditions pertaining to Gilgamesh survived in later Greek, Jewish, Arabic, Syriac and Manichaean sources, though in some of them, for example in the Book of Giants, he is portrayed as a malevolent supernatural being rather than a legendary ruler.
Enkidu		Enkidu is portrayed as a wild man created by the goddess Aruru from clay to act as a foil to Gilgamesh. He spends his early life in the wilderness, among animals. He is eventually discovered by a hunter, who after consulting his father and the king of his city, Gilgamesh, brings the prostitute Shamhat to the forest to seduce him. She subsequently takes Enkidu first to a camp of shepherds, where he learns to act like a human and fulfills the role of a night watchman, and eventually to Uruk. In the city he confronts Gilgamesh on behalf of his subjects, but after wrestling the two become friends. He later accompanies Gilgamesh on his expedition to the cedar forest and assists him in the battle against the Bull of Heaven. However, as punishment for the deaths of these two beings death is then decreed for him by Enlil. After receiving visions of his fate and the underworld he finally dies twelve days later. Enkidu's name can be translated as "lord of the pleasant place" and was originally used as an ordinary given name, as attested for example in an Early Dynastic name list from Shuruppak. While in a few texts predating the Epic of Gilgamesh it is preceded by the so-called "divine determinative", it was usually written without it. Enkidu's origin story did not originate in earlier narratives about Gilgamesh, in which he is an ordinary man, and might have been adapted from another, unrelated source. An additional difference between the earlier sources and the epic is that in some of the former Enkidu is only portrayed as Gilgamesh's servant, rather than as his friend and companion. The term used to describe his relation to Gilgamesh is ibru (Sumerian kuli), which indicates an "informal relation bordering on equality". Regardless of the differences, Enkidu was consistently portrayed as a source of wise advice. In the epic he also acts as a dream interpreter, which is unusual, as elsewhere in Mesopotamian literature this task is typically performed by a woman close to the protagonist of a given work, for example Geshtinanna in myths about Dumuzi. Attestations of Enkidu outside the epic and its forerunners are very rare, though he does occur in an Old Babylonian incantation meant to help a baby fall asleep, which recounts his youth in the wilderness, and possibly also in the god list An = Anum (though in this case the restoration of his name is uncertain).

== Other major characters ==
Characters in this section are arranged in order of appearance in the Standard Babylonian version of the epic.

Name	Image	Overview
Ninsun Ninsumunna		Ninsun, "lady of wild cows", is a well attested Mesopotamian goddess, worshiped through all periods of the region's antiquity. She is consistently identified as Gilgamesh's mother both in the Old Babylonian fragments of the epic and in the later standardized edition. A single source, an Old Babylonian eršemma, refers to Gula as Gilgamesh's mother instead, which might represent an otherwise unknown alternate tradition or reflect syncretism between these two goddesses. Ninsun is not an active character in any version of the epic predating the Standard Babylonian edition. She is responsible for interpreting the dreams of her son which foretell the arrival of Enkidu and the eventual development of a strong bond between them. She also adopts Enkidu before the heroes embark on their journey.
Shamhat Šamkatum		Shamhat (Šamḫat), in the Old Babylonian version of the epic referred to as Šamkatum, is a prostitute (ḫarimtu) responsible for bringing Enkidu to Uruk. She is the first character in the epic to refer to him by his name, as even in the account of his creation he is only referred to with descriptive phrases such as "offspring of silence". She is later mentioned again by Enkidu when he is on his deathbed and curses people who he met in the beginning of the epic, as they accidentally set the chain of events which lead to his death in motion. However, the sun god Shamash appears to rebuke him for this, and praises Shamhat for teaching him and letting him meet Gilgamesh. Ultimately Enkidu regrets his words and blesses her instead. Shamhat's name has a double meaning, as while it is an ordinary given name derived from the adjective šamḫu, which designated qualities related to physical well-being, in the context of the epic it is also meant to resemble the word šamḫatu, a synonym of ḫarimtu.
Shamash		Shamash (Sumerian Utu) is the Mesopotamian sun god. In the Old Babylonian version, Gilgamesh directly asks him for approval before embarking on the expedition to Humbaba's forest, but in the Standard Babylonian edition Ninsun is responsible for securing his support instead. At her request, he provides Gilgamesh with thirteen winds. He uses them during the hero's battle with Humbaba, allowing him to gain the upper hand. Later he unsuccessfully tries to argue against the decision of the other gods, who decide either Gilgamesh or Enkidu have to die as punishment for the deaths of Humbaba and the Bull of Heaven. In the Old Babylonian version, he also appears later to try to dissuade Gilgamesh from seeking immortality, but this passage is unique to this variant of the epic. In the standalone Sumerian Gilgamesh narratives Utu appears instead, while in the Hurrian version a reference to the corresponding sun god, Šimige, has been identified.
Humbaba		Humbaba is the guardian of the cedar forest, appointed to this position by the god Enlil. He confronts Gilgamesh and Enkidu after noticing they are cutting down trees. Gilgamesh emerges victorious with the help of winds provided by Shamash. Humbaba begs to be spared, but Enkidu urges Gilgamesh to kill him, and he eventually follows his advice. Before dying, Humbaba curses both of them, stating that they will never grow old, foreshadowing both Enkidu's premature death and Gilgamesh's fruitless quest for immortality. It is possible that western adaptations of the epic might have enlarged his role, as due to residing to the west of Mesopotamia he might have been a figure appealing to local audiences. One possible example is the Hurrian adaptation of the epic. Mary R. Bachvarova suggests that it might have either focused on portraying his death as a tragedy or present an alternate version of the events involving him in which he survived the confrontation. Humbaba is portrayed as anthropomorphic in the epic, though some of his characteristics appear to be tree-like. Additionally, omen texts indicate that he was believed to possess unusual physiognomy, including large eyes and nose. His name first occurs in the Ur III period as an ordinary given name, but its etymology is unknown. He is also attested in sources postdating the last cuneiform texts, including the Book of Giants.
Ishtar		Ishtar (Sumerian Inanna) is a goddess associated with the planet Venus, war and love. After Gilgamesh returns to Uruk from his expedition to the cedar forest, she proposes marriage to him, which constitutes a reversal of contemporary courtship customs. Gilgamesh rejects it, stating that Ishtar would be unable to take the traditional roles of a wife, and outlines the often gruesome fates of her previous lover. She runs out and under threat of releasing the dead from the underworld takes the Bull of Heaven from Anu to unleash it upon Uruk as revenge. According to Paul-Alain Beaulieu, it is possible that her portrayal in the epic reflects what he describes as "anti-Ištar sentiment", pointing both at the section of the plot focused on the Bull of Heaven and on the fact that Uruk and Eanna are only called the dwelling of Anu in the Old Babylonian version, in contrast with other sources, including the Standard Babylonian epic. In the earlier standalone Sumerian Gilgamesh narratives Inanna appears accordingly. The Hurrian adaptation puts Šauška in the same role, while the Hittite one uses the partially logographic writing ^{d}IŠTAR-li, which is agreed to refer to yet another goddess, presumably Anzili.
Siduri Naḫmazulel, Naḫmizulen		Siduri is a goddess who acts as an alewife. She resides on the shore of the cosmic ocean, where she maintains a tavern. She tells Gilgamesh how to reach Utnapishtim, advising him to seek the boatman Urshanabi. In the Old Babylonian version of the epic she also she tries to dissuade him from pursuing immortality, arguing that he needs to accept that death is the ultimate fate of every mortal and enjoy his time on earth. This passage is however absent from later editions. She is left nameless in the Old Babylonian fragments of the epic, and her name is only known from the Standard Babylonian edition, where it is written with the so-called divine determinative, which designates it as a theonym. This name might have Hurrian origin, as šiduri, "young woman", is well attested as an epithet of Hurrian goddesses, for example Allanzu, though derivation from Akkadian cannot be ruled out either, with Šī-dūrī, "she is my wall", metaphorically "she is my protection", attested as a personal name in the Ur III period. In the Hurrian adaptation of the epic, she bears the name Naḫmazulel or Naḫmizulen, but she is referred to with the epithet šiduri both in this version and in Hittite. Gary Beckman proposes that this term was introduced in these versions, and later was incorporated into the Standard Babylonian epic as a proper name. Andrew R. George points out that it cannot be ruled out that the name was then provided by speakers of Akkadian with a folk etymology. Siduri is otherwise attested in Mesopotamian sources as a goddess associated with wisdom, which according to ]George matches her portrayal in the Epic of Gilgamesh, and as an epithet of Ishtar, though as established by Wilfred G. Lambert it is impossible for the latter to be the case in the context of the epic.
Urshanabi Sursunabu		Urshanabi is a boatman serving Utnapishtim. In the end of the composition, he also fulfills the role of Gilgamesh's traveling companion. He transports visitors willing to see Utnapishtim across the cosmic ocean. After Gilgamesh fails, Utnapishtim curses Urshanabi, most likely for bringing the hero to him, and declares he can no longer fulfill his function. He subsequently joins Gilgamesh on his way back to Uruk, and the final lines of the epic, Gilgamesh's speech describing the walls of Uruk and an invitation to climb them, are directed to him. A bilingual text indicates that his name was an artificial Sumerian translation of the Akkadian name Amēl-Ea, "man of Ea", with the second element, the numeral 40, being used to represent the name of a god associated with this number, which is a well attested practice in Mesopotamian sources. Sebastian Fink instead proposed that since the numeral 40 was also used to represent 2/3, Urshanabi's name might instead mean "servant of two thirds", an allusion to his role as the helper of Gilgamesh, who was one third human and two thirds god. In an Old Babylonian version of the epic from Sippar the same character is instead named Sursunabu, but this version of the name does not reappear in any later sources and might simply be an example of textual corruption.
Utnapishtim Ullu		Utanapishtim is a survivor of the great flood who was granted immortality by the gods, the last of the kings who reigned before the flood. In the Standard Babylonian version, the meeting between him and Gilgamesh constitutes the climax of the entire story, and as such is much longer than Gilgamesh's earlier encounters with Siduri and Urshanabi. After meeting Gilgamesh, he criticizes his pursuit of immortality as foolish and points out he neglected the duties of a king because of it. He explains to him than death is an inevitable part of life, as established by the gods. He also tells them the story of the great flood he survived. To test Gilgamesh, he tells him to try to stay awake for a week, and once he fails he wakes him up to tell him that if he cannot overcome sleep he should not be thinking about overcoming death. However, as a reward for his deeds he gives him a chance to obtain a plant which, if eaten, would rejuvenate him. Utnapishtim's name is an Akkadian reinterpretation of Ziusudra, "life of distant days", the earliest Mesopotamian "flood hero". However, it is not a direct translation, and most commonly is understood as "he found life". He is described as the son of Ubar-Tutu, the last king before the flood according to a tradition documented in the Sumerian King List. In the Hittite and Hurrian adaptations, his equivalent bears the name Ullu, "the nominative singular masculine of the Akkadian pronoun of far deixis", which can be translated as "the one over there" or "the faraway one". His immortality is presented as a reward for surviving a plague rather than a flood, despite the Hittites being familiar with Atrahasis. Utanapishtim is also attested in the Book of Giants, which postdates the last instances of the use of cuneiform, though the only reference to him has been identified in a single fragment from Turfan.

== Minor characters ==
Characters in this section are arranged alphabetically, and include deities only referenced by name.

Name	Image	Overview
Adad		Adad is the Mesopotamian weather god. In the account of the great flood presented to Gilgamesh by Utnapishtim, he is responsible for starting the storm which resulted in this cataclysm. While Adad plays no major role elsewhere in the Mesopotamian versions of the Epic of Gilgamesh, his Hurrian counterpart Teshub is "ubiquitous" in the corresponding adaptation, though due to still insufficient knowledge of the Hurrian language and state of preservation the detail of its plot are unknown.
Anu		Anu is the Mesopotamian god of the sky, regarded as a distant creator figure and king of the gods. Ishtar acquires the Bull of Heaven from him by threatening to release the dead from the underworld if he does not fulfill her request. While the epic refers to Anu and his wife Antu as Ishtar's parents, this was not the most widespread genealogy attributed to her, and in most sources she was recognized as the daughter of Nanna and Ningal instead.
Antu		Antu was the spouse of Anu. In the epic she is mentioned when Ishtar demands to be let to use the Bull of Heaven to punish Gilgamesh. However, she is not attested in any texts from Uruk predating the first millennium BCE, and only became one of the major deities of this city after a religious reform which took place in the fifth century BCE.
Aruru		Aruru is described in the Standard Babylonian edition as the goddess responsible for creating Enkidu from clay on behalf of the other deities. This act is presented as impersonal, and she cannot be considered Enkidu's mother, which is reflected for example in Humbaba's derogatory remarks about his origin, which highlight he had no parents. As summarized by Jeremy Black, in the context of the epic Aruru is a "generic mother goddess". However, she was initially a distinct deity associated with vegetation, rather than birth or creation.
Aya		Aya is the Mesopotamian goddess of dawn and the wife of Shamash. In the Standard Babylonian epic Ninsun asks her to intercede with her husband on Gilgamesh's behalf, which reflects contemporary religious practice. Imploring Aya to act as a mediator between worshipers and Shamash is well attested in other sources, and finds parallel in formulas aimed at other goddesses, for example Belet-ekalli, in connection with their respective husbands.
Bull of Heaven		The Bull of Heaven is a mythical being representing the constellation known today as Taurus. After being unleashed by Ishtar, the bull rampages in Uruk, but Gilgamesh and Enkidu manage to defeat him. An earlier version of this episode is recorded in the Sumerian poem Gilgamesh and the Bull of Heaven. One copy of the latter text from Nippur, dated to the Ur III period, is the oldest surviving literary text about Gilgamesh. In this earlier narrative, Ishtar's counterpart Inanna instead urges Anu to let her unleash the Bull of Heaven because Gilgamesh is rampaging through Uruk.
Belet-Seri		Belet-Seri is goddess who fulfills the role of the chief scribe of the underworld, regarded as the Akkadian counterpart of either Geshtinanna or Azimua. As a servant of Ereshkigal, she appears alongside her mistress in Enkidu's vision of the underworld, in which she is said to keep a tally of the dead.
Dumuzi		Dumuzi is an agricultural god. Gilgamesh mentions him as one of Ishtar's past lovers. He also makes an offering to him during Enkidu's funeral, here referring to him as the "beloved of Ishtar". A trio of deities consisting of Dumuzi, Gilgamesh and Ningishzida is mentioned in a number of sources dealing with the underworld, including the account of Gilgamesh's eventual fate in Death of Gilgamesh and a number of laments.
Ea		Ea (Sumerian Enki) is a god associated with wisdom and the subterranean freshwater ocean (abzu). He plays a role in the story of the great flood recounted by Utnapishtim to Gilgamesh, and similarly as in other flood myths is responsible for saving the former from this cataclysm. He also appears in the poem Death of Gilgamesh, where during a debate between deities about Gilgamesh's fate after death, which is uncertain due to his partially divine ancestry, he makes a case for treating him as a mortal, arguing that only the survivor of the flood, here referred to with the name Ziusudra, earned the right to immortality, and the same privilege cannot be extended to others.
Elders of Uruk		An assembly of elders of the city of Uruk is mentioned when Gilgamesh and Enkidu prepare to leave for the cedar forest. They act as counselors of the king. They initially try to dissuade him from the expedition due to the potential dangers he may face, highlighted by Enkidu. However, they do not have the authority to control him, and ultimately entrust Enkidu with protecting him during the journey and with bringing him back to Uruk safely. The elders are absent from the Hittite adaptation due to the streamlining of the events taking place in Uruk. A reference to a council of elders is already present in the poem Gilgamesh and Akka, and is presumed the presence of such an institution in literary compositions reflects historical reality.
Enlil		Enlil is one of the main deities of the Mesopotamian pantheon. After the deaths of Humbaba and the Bull of Heaven, he, Ea, Anu and Shamash argue over the right punishment for Gilgamesh and Enkidu, and he eventually decrees that the latter must die. Utnapishtim credits him with bestowing immortality upon him and his wife after they survived the flood. While in Atrahasis Enlil sends the flood because of noise made by humans, no reason how it started is provided in the version of the flood myth preserved in the Epic of Gilgamesh. In the earlier poem Death of Gilgamesh, Enlil appears to the hero on his deathbed to reassure him that even though he must die as a mortal, he will be reunited with Enkidu and various relatives in the underworld, and that he will be elevated to the rank of a minor deity there.
Ennugi		Ennugi is an agricultural god associated with irrigation. An incantation also credits him with the creation of grubs. In the Epic of Gilgamesh is one of the gods who are present when the decision is made to send the great flood.
Ereshkigal		Ereshkigal is the goddess of the underworld. She appears in the company of her scribe Belet-Seri in Enkidu's vision of the underworld, which he relays to Gilgamesh before dying. Offerings to her and a number of other underworld deities, including Namtar, Hušbišag and others, are also mentioned in the description of Enkidu's funeral. Ereshkigal is also mentioned on tablet XII on the Standard Babylonian edition of the epic. This text is a partial Akkadian translation of an earlier Sumerian poem, and despite being the final tablet of this version of the epic it does not form a part of its plot.
Errakal		Errakal is a god seemingly associated with the destruction caused by storms. He is mentioned in the account of the great flood, where his task is to rip the mooring poles before the cataclysm starts.
Etana		Etana is a legendary king of Kish who according to the Sumerian King List reigned for 1500 years immediately after the flood. The role of minor official of the underworld is also attested for him. In the Epic of Gilgamesh is mentioned by Enkidu as one of the dead he saw in his vision of the underworld, which might constitute a reference to a myth in which he was himself the protagonist, as it describes him as a mortal despite his supernatural accomplishments. In this narrative, he reached the heavens on the back of an eagle. He is also mentioned alongside Gilgamesh, Enkidu, Humbaba and a number of other legendary kings (Alulim, Bazi and Zizi) in the Ballad of Early Rulers. It is possible that both he and Gilgamesh were regarded as minor underworld deities due to this fate being considered a consolation for failure to attain immortality.
Irnina		Irnina is the goddess of victory. Ninsun mentions her while addressing Shamash. According to Andrew R. George, in this context Irnina is most likely mentioned due to an association with the underworld attested elsewhere, as the passage deals with Gilgamesh's fate after death.
Išḫara		Išḫara was originally the tutelary goddess of the kings of Ebla, and her worship spread to southern Mesopotamia through Mari in the Akkadian period. She is referenced in the Old Babylonian version of the epic as the goddess of weddings. Most likely the "bed of Išḫara" mentioned in it is a literary expression referring to a bed in which a marriage was consummated, and as such should not be interpreted as a reference to an alleged "sacred marriage" postulated in older publications.
Lugalbanda		Lugalbanda is a legendary king of Uruk regarded as the husband of Ninsun. In the epic, he is implied to be Gilgamesh's father (or stepfather), and additionally is stated to be his personal tutelary deity. Gilgamesh dedicates the horns of the slain Bull of Heaven to him. However, in the older poem Gilgamesh and the Bull of Heaven they are instead offered to Inanna in a similar context. In the older poem Gilgamesh and Humbaba, the hero explicitly refers to himself as Lugalbanda's son, swearing "by my mother Ninsun who bore me, by my father holy Lugalbanda who sired me". However, other traditions about Gilgamesh's origin also existed. In the Hittite adaptation of the epic, no mention is made of Lugalbanda as his father, and he is instead created by the gods, with Ea, the "sun god of heaven" and the weather god singled out, which was presumably a change meant to adjust the text of Hittite sensibilities, as indicated by the inclusion of the latter two deities. In the Sumerian King List, his father is instead only referred to as a "phantom", and while Lugalbanda is also listed among the kings of Uruk, he is separated from him by Dumuzi and there is no indication they were related.
Ninurta		Ninurta is a god associated with both agriculture and warfare. He plays a minor role in the creation of Enkidu, which is most likely meant to foreshadow his destiny to fight Gilgamesh in defense of the people of Uruk, similarly to how this god was portrayed as the victor of battles against monsters such as Asakku and Anzû. He is also among the gods mentioned in Utnapishtim's account of the great flood.
Scorpion people		Girtablullû, "scorpion men", are mythical beings regarded as attendants of Shamash who were portrayed in Mesopotamian art with the torso and head of a human and the tail of a scorpion. Gilgamesh encounters a pair of them, one male and one female, during his journey in search of Utnapishtim on the mountain of sunrise, Mashu. After hearing him recollect his deeds, they tell him nobody, presumably with the exception of Shamash, has ever journeyed through the path they guard, and then bless him. According to Gary Beckman, this episode was most likely only introduced in the Standard Babylonian edition of the epic.
Shangashu		Shangashu, from Akkadian "murderer", is the name applied in the Hittite adaptation of the epic to a hunter left anonymous in other versions of the epic. He finds Enkidu in the wilderness and after consulting his father and Gilgamesh enlists the help of Shamhat in order to bring him to Uruk. Enkidu later curses him on his deathbed, blaming him and Shamhat for the events which lead to his incoming death.
Shullat and Hanish		Shullat and Hanish are a pair of divine twins almost always mentioned together. They were regarded as warlike and destructive. They appear in the account of the great flood alongside Adad, possibly acting as a personification of gale in this context.
Silili		Silili is mentioned in passing in the Standard Babylonian epic as a deity who seemingly was the mythical ancestor of the horse. She is described as a mourning mother. Her origin is uncertain, and her name might originate in a language spoken outside Mesopotamia; a connection with Sililitum, a servant of the deified rainbow, is considered implausible, and a relation to the personal name Si-NI-NI (possibly to be read as Silili), which belonged to an individual who according to a document from the Ur III period hailed from Šimaški, has been proposed.
Sons of Humbaba		A reference to "seven sons of Humbaba" has been identified in a fragment of the Standard Babylonian epic discovered in 2011 in Sulaymaniyah in Iraq. Gilgamesh and Enkidu hunt them down after the death of their father. According to Farouk Al-Rawi and Andrew R. George, they most likely embody his seven auras. A similar reference to personifications of these powers occurs in an Old Babylonian fragment, though they are not explicitly labeled as Humbaba's sons. Al-Rawi and George suggest they might be a reference to the well attested motif of the seven sons of Enmesharra.
Stone Ones		The "Stone Ones" (Akkadian: šūt abni) have variously been interpreted as either supernatural sailors or as elements of Urshanabi's vessel (rudder oars, gunwales, punting poles, sails, anchor stones, kedges or talismans). The Hittite version of the epic explicitly refers to them as animated statues acting as its crewmen, which according to Andrew R. George can be presumed to also hold true for the Mesopotamian original. When Gilgamesh first encounters Urshanabi, he smashes the Stone Ones during a fight, which makes the journey more difficult.
Šakkan		Šakkan was a god associated with quadrupeds and pastoralism. Enkidu's state during his early years among animals is compared to him. He is also mentioned by Enkidu as one of the figures he saw in his vision of the underworld, which according to Andrew R. George might constitute a reference to his incoming demise, as Šakkan was the lord of the animals he grew up with.
The sea		The personified sea appears only in the Hittite adaptation of the epic, in which Gilgamesh visits him only to be cursed after greeting him. The Hurrian god Impaluri, regarded as the sea's servant, also appears in a hitherto unplaced fragment of this edition. The inclusion of these figures, absent from the Mesopotamian originals, is presumed to reflect the greater religious importance of the sea among the vassals of the Hittite Empire in Syria and Kizzuwatna.
Wer		Wer was a weather god worshiped in the north of Babylonia, in Assyria, and in the Diyala and Middle Euphrates areas. In the Old Babylonian version of the epic, he is described as the master of Humbaba. Andrew R. George notes that this passage presumably can be reconciled with the tradition according to which Humbaba owed his position to Enlil, and it is plausible that even if Wer appointed him, Enlil was responsible for approving this decision. In the context of the epic, he is most likely meant to function as a stand-in for a weather god worshiped in the Levant, in other Mesopotamian sources treated as a form of Adad, "Adad of the Woodland", instead.

== Other characters connected to Gilgamesh in Mesopotamian tradition ==
In addition to the Epic of Gilgamesh, a wide variety of other texts and works of art focused on the same king are known. Six standalone Sumerian poems about his deeds have been identified, Gilgamesh, Enkidu, and the Netherworld, two versions of Gilgamesh and Humbaba (A and B), Gilgamesh and the Bull of Heaven, Gilgamesh and Akka and Death of Gilgamesh. A further related text might be the Tale of Gudam, though Gilgamesh himself does not appear in this composition. While the plot of the later epic incorporated many elements of their plots, some of them were ultimately left out.

Characters in this section originate in these works and are arranged alphabetically.

Name	Image	Overview
Akka		Akka was a king of Kish according to the Sumerian King List. He appears in the poem Gilgamesh and Akka, which describes his failed attempt to subjugate Uruk. After his defeat he asks to be let go due to offering refuge to Gilgamesh at some point in the past, and is granted his request. The defeat of Akka is also mentioned in the Sumerian King List, where he is the last ruler from the dynasty of Kish, and after his reign "kingship went to Uruk" in the aftermath of a battle, though Gilgamesh only occurs as the sixth of the rulers of the latter city, not immediately after him.
Birḫurturra		The reading of the name Birḫurturra is uncertain. He appears as one of Gilgamesh's guards in Gilgamesh and Akka.
Enmebaragesi		Enmebaragesi was Gilgamesh's older sister according to version A of Gilgamesh and Humbaba. In this text, she is mentioned as one of the two women Gilgamesh offers to send to him as wives. It is not certain what, if any, relation existed between her and the identically named ruler of Kish. Attempts have been made to reconcile the two Enmebaragesis by arguing that the ruler named Enmebaragesi was a woman, but according to Piotr Michalowski this theory is implausible and rests on literalist approach to fiction. He instead suggests the name was used in this context as a joke at Humbaba's expense, with Gilgamesh pretending to have a sister whose name was in reality that of a rival king. It is also possible that the scene was based on an unknown pun or on another hitherto unknown joke. The king Enmebaragesi is regarded as a historical figure, as his inscriptions have been discovered, but the 900 years long reign attributed to him in the Sumerian King List is fictional. A tradition according to which Gilgamesh defeated him is documented in the hymn Shulgi O, though elsewhere this deed is instead attributed to the king Dumuzi instead. Similarly to the poem about the conflict between Gilgamesh and Akka, these references might be a reflection of a prolonged historical power struggle between the states of Uruk and Kish.
Lugalgabagal		Lugalgabagal, "the king is valiant", was Gilgamesh's court minstrel according to Gilgamesh and the Bull of Heaven. In this poem, he sings while the hero is drinking, which might be a clue about the context in which the composition was performed. He also informs him about the arrival of the Bull of Heaven. He is otherwise only attested in the Tale of Gudam, where he condemns the voracity of the eponymous character. This composition has been compared to Gilgamesh and the Bull of Heaven, though the hero himself is not mentioned in it. It has been argued that Gudam, whose name means "he is an ox", was analogous to the Bull of Heaven, and that the two tales were outright variants of each other, though this proposal is not universally accepted. Additionally, the hero who confronts him is not Gilgamesh but an anonymous enigmatic "fishmerman of Inanna", sometimes linked by researchers with Dumuzi the Fisherman or with a fisherman who helps her with acquiring the temple Eanna in Inanna and An.
Peštur		Peštur, "little fig", was Gilgamesh's younger sister according to version A of Gilgamesh and Humbaba. Her name is written with the divine determinative in this text. She is mentioned as one of the two women Gilgamesh offers to send to the eponymous adversary as wives, the other being Enmebaragesi. This is presumed to be a satirical portrayal of the custom of marrying daughters of kings to foreign rulers in the Ur III period, and it has been noted that Peštur's name resembles that of one of the daughters of king Shulgi, péš.TUR.TUR ("tiny mouse"). She is also referenced in Gilgamesh and the Bull of Heaven, where she is mentioned by Lugalgabagal, and possibly in the Tale of Gudam. While not much is otherwise known about the literary Peštur (or her presumed historical inspiration), it is nonetheless assumed that she was a traditional character well known by scribes in the Old Babylonian period, as evidenced by her presence in more than one composition. Alhena Gadotti additionally notes that Gilgamesh's two sisters are unusual as characters appearing the corpus of Old Babylonian Sumerian literary texts, as otherwise only five mortal women are referenced in it, including a number historical figures (Enheduanna, Ninšatapada, who was a daughter of Sîn-kāšid of Uruk, and additionally possibly the wife and mother of a certain Ludingira, respectively Nawirtum and Šat-Ištar) and Sagburu from one of the tales about Enmerkar.
Sîn-lēqi-unninni		Sîn-lēqi-unninni was regarded as the author of the Standard Babylonian edition of the Epic of Gilgamesh, as stated in literary catalogues preserved in Neo-Assyrian copies. While his name indicates he most likely lived during the Kassite period, in late tradition he was anachronistically regarded as a contemporary of Gilgamesh, specifically as his scholar, as attested in the Uruk List of Kings and Sages from the Seleucid period. Nothing else is known about him other than that starting in the seventh century BCE a number of members of the intellectual elite of Uruk, for example some of the kalû, considered him their ancestor.
Ur-Nungal Ur-lugal		According to the Sumerian King List, Ur-Nungal, alternatively known as Ur-lugal, was the son of Gilgamesh and his successor on the throne. Under the variant name Ur-lugal he is named as the son of Gilgamesh in the Tummal Inscription, an Old Babylonian school text describing the construction or repair of various temples and shrines of Enlil in Nippur, and analogous activities undertaken by their sons for Ninlil in nearby Tummal. Most of the text, including this section, is presumed to not reflect historical reality. Ur-Nungal also appears in the poem Death of Gilgamesh, where he is responsible for preparing his father's funeral.
