= Tale of Gudam =

Mesopotamian myth

Tale of Gudam, also known as the Gudam Epic or Inanna and Gudam, is a Mesopotamian myth known from two Old Babylonian copies from Nippur. It tells the tale of Gudam, an otherwise unknown character, who goes on a rampage in Uruk. The minstrel Lugalgabagal criticizes his behavior, but his remarks only enrage him more. He is finally stopped by a fisherman of Inanna. The goddess herself subsequently decides to spare his life when he starts pleading, and sends him to live in a ditch near Zabalam. Many aspects of the story are a subject of debate in Assyriology, including the nature of Gudam and the identity of the fisherman. Possible connections between the Tale of Gudam and other texts have also been noted. In particular, Gilgamesh and the Bull of Heaven is considered a close parallel, with some authors outright considering the two texts to be variants of one narrative.

== History ==
The Tale of Gudam is a cuneiform text written in Sumerian in the Old Babylonian period, classified by Assyriologists as a myth. Two copies have been discovered so far, both in Nippur, though only one (CBS 13859) is a full tablet, with the other (Ni 4409) being a broken fragment of a tablet's left side. Additionally, an Old Babylonian literary catalog most likely contains the first line of the composition, which is not preserved on either tablet. It is only partially preserved and has been restored as gud-dam iri^{ki} [...], originally possibly gud-dam iri^{ki} ba-ra-è, "Gudam went out to the city". The catalog places it between the first lines of Gilgamesh and Akka and Gilgamesh and Humbaba (version B).

The text was first published by Arno Poebel in 1914, with a second translation subsequently prepared by Maurus Witzel in 1938, though both of them relied only on the first discovered exemplar and are now considered outdated. Few other studies have been dedicated to it through the twentieth century, though in 1976 Samuel Noah Kramer identified an additional fragment, Ni 4409, which remains the only known additional copy. A section of the poem was also translated by Wolfgang Heimpel for the corresponding article in Reallexikon der Assyriologie und Vorderasiatischen Archäologie. The first complete modern edition was published in 1990 by Willem Römer. Subsequently, another was prepared in 2001 for the Electronic Text Corpus of Sumerian Literature. Douglas Frayne's translation also published in 2001.

== Plot ==
The Tale of Gudam revolves around the eponymous being, Gudam, who is not mentioned in any other sources. According to Bendt Alster's interpretation, it most likely begins with a description of preparations for a festival of Inanna, in which Gudam participates, though his exact role in it is unknown. Alternatively, he might have not been invited to partake in it. He subsequently enters a storehouse and starts rampaging in search of beer and liquor, but due to the loss of the first lines of the narrative, it is not certain under what circumstances these actions began. Gudam is then surrounded by armed inhabitants of Uruk and hears the speech of the minstrel Lugalgabagal, in which his voracity is condemned:

The singer repeated the song, he strummed the strings:
"That which you ate, that which you ate
You did not eat bread, what you ate was your own flesh.
That which you drank, that which you drank
You did not drink beer, what you drank was your own blood.
Gudam, in the street of Uruk, the multitudes followed you.
The multitudes surrounded you with weapons!
Go on, do not do it! That which the woman has ordered me (to say), O people, I have come (to say)!"

The woman he mentions is presumably Inanna. His intervention sends Gudam into a rage. He declares that he will destroy the Eanna in Uruk and a temple in Zabalam and starts killing the people around him with his weapon (šar_{2}-ur_{2}), until a hero intervenes. The anonymous protagonist, described as the "junior fisherman, the fisherman of Inanna" (šu-ḫa_{6} tur-re šu-ḫa_{6} ^{d}inana-ke_{4}), smites him with a dual-sided axe. Gudam starts crying and pleads with Inanna to be spared, offering to bring her cattle and sheep from the mountains in exchange. The final section of the story is poorly preserved, though apparently Inanna accepts his offer, and sends him to live in a ditch in a field near Zabalam. She declares that his mother will have to hire a donkey and purchase a sack for him. The text concludes with a doxology to Inanna:

Inanna, let me praise your heroism!
Your praise is sweet!

== Interpretation ==
Due to the meaning of Gudam's name, "he is an ox", it is possible that he was an ox-like being. Andrew R. George outright describes him as a mythical bull. However, the text does not provide any information about his appearance. Bendt Alster considered it unlikely that Gudam was a bull, preferring to treat him as a figure similar to humans and deities. He assumed he might have been a satirical reflection of a real enemy of the city of Uruk, for example Elam. However, he did tentatively voice support for the proposal that he might be related to the well-attested motif in Mesopotamian art, the bull-man. Laura Feldt assumes he was either a mythical part bull, part human being, or a god figuratively described as bull-like.

Researches also interpret the role of Lugalgabagal differently, with Alhena Gadotti assuming he was in service of Inanna, as he directly states that he is acting on behalf of a woman when he speaks to Gudam. Bendt Alster also assumed that Inanna was the woman meant, though he argued the minstrel was a servant of Gudam, and was trying to mediate between him and Inanna but ended up insulting him.

Another aspect of the Tale of Gudam which has been a subject of scholarly inquiries is the identity of the fisherman. Gianni Marchesi has proposed that he can be identified as Dumuzi the Fisherman (not to be confused with the god Dumuzi), a legendary king of Uruk hailing from Kuara mentioned in the Sumerian King List but otherwise absent from literary texts, with the phrase tur-re being the result of ancient textual corruption of damaged TUR(/dumu/)-zi, as the beginnings of the signs re and zi look similar and could be confused if damaged. However, Alhena Gadotti instead proposes to read this phrase as šu-peš tur, and suggests it might be an allusion to Peštur, the sister of Gilgamesh known from Gilgamesh and Humbaba, though she admits the absence of the dingir ("divine determinative") which precedes her name elsewhere is a possible obstacle for this interpretation. Bendt Alster instead assumed that Šupeštur is a personal name, and suggests linking this figure with the fishermen who help Inanna in the myth Inanna and An when she faces the South Wind. However, he assumed the "little fisherman" had no cosmological significance, despite the possible connection to the aforementioned myth, which according to him might have dealt with such topics. Ultimately none of the proposals can be conclusively proven.

A further topic which has been a subject of debate is the term used to refer to Gudam's weapon, šarur. This name is otherwise only attested in association with Ningirsu and closely connected Ninurta, and other deities linked to them, such as Zababa, with the Tale of Gudam being a potential exception from this rule. Laura Feldt argues that it can be considered a conscious reference, with the Tale of Gudam possibly being a satirical reflection of myths focused on Ninurta, such as Lugal-e, Angim or Epic of Anzû. However, she rules out the possibility that it was a reflection of a hypothetical myth involving a battle between Inanna and Ninurta.

The fact that Gudam is left alive presumably reflects his repentance, in contrast with the antagonist of another myth focused on Inanna, Shukaletuda. Bendt Alster assumed that the reference to Gudam's mother buying a donkey and a sack for him is an indication that his ultimate fate is meant to be humiliating, as it constitutes a reversal of the well attested motif of a mother praising a victorious protagonist, and that his status will be reduced from that of a “proud hero” to a traveling peddler. However, according to Alhena Gadotti the passage should instead be taken as an indication that Gudam is now as helpless as a child and as such will have to depend on his mother. Seth Richardson argues that Gudam's fate reflects his "uncouth" characters and indicates he was unfit to live in a city, and views it as an example of a passage reflecting the perception of countryside as unsafe compared to urban areas.

=== Possible connections with other myths ===
A connection between the Tale of Gudam and myths about the hero Gilgamesh has been proposed, though this hero is absent from it. In an Old Babylonian catalog of literary texts, the Tale of Gudam is listed alongside compositions focused on Gilgamesh. Narrative similarities between it and the poem Gilgamesh and the Bull of Heaven in particular have been pointed out. Some authors go as far as describing them as two variants of the same narrative, though according to Alhena Gadotti despite a plausible intertextual connection between the two texts it is implausible that the Tale of Gudam was simply an alternative or older version of the Gilgamesh myth, and some of its elements parallel other works of Mesopotamian literature instead. The similarities include the role of the possibly bull-like Gudam and the Bull of Heaven. It has also been noted that Lugalgabal plays a similar role in both texts, as his involvement precedes the intervention of a hero against a bull-like being; he is not mentioned in any other sources, and his name is not attested as an ordinary given name outside of literary texts.

Similarities between the pleas of Gudam and Humbaba in the myth Gilgamesh and Humbaba have also been noted. However, the latter was unsuccessful, as while Gilgamesh was willing to spare him, Enkidu urged him to kill him instead.

It has also been suggested that Gudam might have in part been the model for the portrayal of Enkidu in Akkadian sources. It is agreed that a change occurred between the composition of the individual Sumerian poems and the Epic of Gilgamesh, as Enkidu, initially portrayed as a human and servant of Gilgamesh, came to be described as a supernatural wild man, which according to Andrew R. George likely reflects the incorporation of elements from another, presently unidentified source. Alhena Gadotti compares the scene in which the citizens of Uruk surround Gudam with the description of Enkidu's arrival in Uruk in the Standard Babylonian version of the Epic of Gilgamesh. However, she notes that due to the demands of the plot of the latter work Enkidu is portrayed as a benevolent figure, in contrast with Gudam.

A further mythical being compared to Gudam is a bovine monster from the Lament for Uruk. This being, referred to as e-ne (possibly a personal name), is compared to an ox, and destroyed the city on behalf of the gods in the distant past, before its destruction by war and deluge which is the main topic of the lament.
