= Gimillu (temple oblate) =

Babylonian temple oblate and official (fl. 539–520 BC)

- Gimillu mār Innin-šumu-ibni
- Occupations: Temple oblate (širku); livestock official and later rent collector of the Eanna temple
- Years active: c. 539–520 BC
- Known for: Repeated prosecutions for theft and embezzlement of temple property
- Relatives: Iddina (brother)

Gimillu, son of Innin-šumu-ibni (fl. c. 539–520 BC) was a širku (temple oblate, a hereditary dependent of the temple) of the Eanna temple in Uruk during the late Neo-Babylonian and early Achaemenid periods. He is known from a large dossier of cuneiform legal records, administrative documents and letters from the Eanna archive. They show him holding responsible posts in the temple's livestock administration and, later, collecting rent from its agricultural land, while being repeatedly tried and convicted for theft, extortion and embezzlement. His trial of 538 BC, in which he admitted to twelve counts of misappropriating temple property, is one of the longest court records of the Neo-Babylonian period. Despite these convictions, he kept his position for about two decades. Historians attribute this to his administrative usefulness and to his connections with the Persian governor Gobryas.

== Background ==
The Eanna temple, dedicated to Ishtar (the "Lady of Uruk") and Nanaya, was one of the largest landowning institutions in Babylonia. It owned tens of thousands of sheep and goats, which were mostly leased to outside herdsmen in return for fixed quotas of animals, wool and goat hair. Shortfalls against those quotas were recorded as "outstanding remainders" (rēḫu) and treated as debts owed to the temple. Temple property, including livestock, was marked with a star-shaped brand, the symbol of Ishtar. By the end of Nabonidus' reign (c. 539 BC) these livestock debts had grown so large that the royal administration intervened in Eanna's affairs, and the effort to collect them intensified under the early Achaemenid kings.

As a širku, Gimillu belonged to a class of hereditary temple dependents, often described in older literature as "temple slaves". The class was internally stratified. Most širkus lived on rations from the temple, but a minority, like Gimillu, held positions of authority and owned considerable property.

== Career ==
=== Livestock official (539–523 BC) ===
Gimillu first appears in 539 BC, in the 17th year of Nabonidus, when he accused a man before witnesses of holding a young bull branded with the star of the Lady of Uruk. The court ruled that Gimillu could take the animal. He then served as the official in charge of the temple's livestock arrears. Aarslev gives his title as ša muḫḫi rēḫāni ("he who is in charge of the outstanding remainders"), an office not otherwise attested. In this role he collected animals and wool from herdsmen who were behind on their obligations. In 534 BC, for example, he received about 300 cattle, 1,807 sheep and goats and 56½ minas of wool from eighteen herdsmen.

In the first year of Cyrus (538 BC) Gimillu was tried in Uruk before the governor (šakin ṭēmi) of Uruk and the senior officials of Eanna, with numerous witnesses and four scribes. He was charged with taking cattle, sheep, goats and other property from the temple's herdsmen and failing to deliver it to Eanna. The record lists twelve separate offences:

- Two temple cows were found in his house and shown to the governor and an assembly of Babylonians and Urukeans. Their temple brands made denial impossible.
- He took sheep from temple flocks without authorisation, including five sheep stolen two months before the trial, three of which he sold for three shekels of silver. The sale contract was read out in court.
- His brother Iddina took a goat from a temple herdsman on Gimillu's orders.
- Sent to bring in a chief herdsman who had not presented his flocks at Eanna for ten years, he instead took barley, silver and a ram from him. In return he released the herdsman's son, who had been held in iron fetters.
- He seized a garment that the temple had issued to an officer of archers for his duties.

Gimillu confessed to all the charges. Under the rule, going back to Hammurabi's laws, that theft of temple property was repaid thirtyfold, he was ordered to deliver 92 adult cattle, 302 head of sheep and goats, and 1 mina 10 shekels of silver. San Nicolò, who first edited the record, called it a "monster trial" (Monstreprozeß).

The conviction did not end his career. Over the next several years he went on bringing cases against others for possessing branded temple animals, and he was himself accused of keeping animals he should have delivered. In 531 BC he escorted a group of temple dependents back to Uruk after they had worked on orders of Gobryas, the governor of Babylon and Across-the-River. When the Eanna officials asked him what the governor had decided about them, he told them how to employ the workers until further orders. In 530 BC he caught a runaway temple ploughman. Instead of returning him to the temple, he hired him out to a private individual, and then made a second contract hiring the same man to another party, keeping the payments for himself.

In the sixth year of Cambyses (524/523 BC) Gimillu was arrested for herding the temple's livestock and poultry into Eanna against the orders of the royal commissioner, who had instructed that they be driven out to pasture. He was locked in a storehouse. While being led to his trial, he broke away from his guards in front of the governor and the assembled officials and tried to flee, but was caught. The verdict has not survived. An undated letter from the royal commissioner at Eanna orders that Gimillu be put in iron fetters and made to repay 30 minas of silver that he had collected from herdsmen.

=== Rent collector (522–520 BC) ===
By 522 BC, during the brief reign of Nebuchadnezzar III, Gimillu had become the official in charge of the rent (ša muḫḫi sūti) on the temple's fields, collecting dates and barley from tenant farmers. In 520 BC, the second year of Darius I, he swore an oath by the gods Bēl and Nabu and by King Darius that he had not sold or given away the rent dates of the previous year, apart from 90 kur that he admitted to. Any further proven embezzlement was to be repaid thirtyfold.

In the same year Gimillu offered to take on the rent collection for a very large area of temple land. The contract would have obliged him to deliver 10,000 kur of barley and 12,000 kur of dates. In return he demanded 1,000 kur of seed grain, 400 ploughmen and 600 oxen. The temple would only provide the seed and 200 oxen. When Gimillu refused these terms, the contract went to another temple oblate who accepted them. Shortly afterwards the temple administrators questioned his brother Iddina about why he had not handed over rent documents that Gimillu had entrusted to him, which had prevented them from collecting the dates. Iddina replied that Gimillu had told him to give the documents to no one without his consent.

Gimillu is not attested after 520 BC.

== Sources ==
Dandamayev counted 29 documents about Gimillu in 1974, compared with the ten cited by Wolfgang Röllig in his earlier encyclopedia entry. His count included letters written to and by Gimillu. In one of these letters, Gimillu complains that he had been detained in Babylon and that for ten years he had been asking for a fixed allotment of seed grain. Many further texts have been identified since. Michael Jursa published new material in 2004 dealing with accusations of commissioned murder, embezzlement and false testimony, and Aarslev re-examined the whole dossier in 2023. Most of the principal texts are in the Yale Babylonian Collection and were published in the Yale Oriental Series.

The Eanna archive as it survives appears to be a "dead archive" of documents discarded in antiquity. It largely breaks off in the second year of Darius I, and this has been linked to an administrative clean-up after the conclusion of the case against Gimillu. Other scholars have proposed alternative explanations for the archive's end.

== Interpretation ==
Dandamayev portrayed Gimillu as a "skilful and unscrupulous embezzler" who was nevertheless a capable administrator. He sometimes advised the temple's senior officials and was wealthy enough to pay the heavy fines imposed on him. Dandamayev also suggested that he enjoyed the protection of the satrap Gobryas, to whom he had access in Babylon. He saw Gimillu as an example of the social stratification among temple dependents in the 6th century BC. San Nicolò had earlier noted Gimillu's apparent influence with the Persian administration.

More recent research places Gimillu's career within the crisis of Eanna's livestock economy and the growing control of the royal administration over the temple. On this view, his office was part of the drive to recover the herdsmen's accumulated debts, a drive in which the satrap Gobryas was directly involved.

== See also ==
- Kushim (Uruk period)
- Fall of Babylon
