= Gobryas =

Gobryas (Ancient Greek: Γοβρύας; Old Persian: 𐎥𐎢𐎲𐎽𐎢𐎺 g-u-b-ru-u-v, reads as Gaub(a)ruva?; Elamite: Kambarma) was a common name of several Persian noblemen:

- Gobryas (general), a Cyrus II general who helped in the conquering of Babylon
- Gobryas (father of Mardonius), father of Mardonius and lance-bearer of Darius I
- Gobryas, a Persian magus and philosopher who has been mentioned by Xanthus of Lydia
- Gobryas (son of Darius I), a son of Darius I who participated in the invasion of Greece
