= Shamhat =

Babylonian mythological character

Shamhat (Akkadian: 𒊩𒌑𒉺, romanized: Šamḫat; also called Shamkat in the old Babylonian version of Gilgamesh) is a character who appears in Tablets I and II of the Epic of Gilgamesh and is mentioned in Tablet VII. She is often characterized as a sacred prostitute, though this identification has been contested, and she plays a significant role in bringing the wild man Enkidu into contact with civilization.

== In the epic ==
Shamhat plays the integral role in Tablet I, of taming the wild man Enkidu, who was created by the gods as the rival to the mighty Gilgamesh. Shamhat was a sacred temple prostitute or harimtu. She is asked by the Hunter to use her attractiveness to tempt Enkidu from the wild, and his 'wildness', civilizing him through continued sacred love-making. Brought to a water source where Enkidu had been spotted, she exposes herself to Enkidu. He enjoys Shamhat for "six days and seven nights" (a fragment found in 2015 and read in 2018 appears to indicate that they had two weeks of sexual intercourse, with a break spent in discussion about Enkidu's future life in Uruk).

Unfortunately for Enkidu, after this long sexual workshop in civility, his former companions—other wild animals—turned away from him in fright at the watering hole where they congregated. Shamhat persuades him to follow her and join the civilized world in the city of Uruk, where Gilgamesh is king, rejecting his former life in the wild of the hills. Henceforth, Gilgamesh and Enkidu become the best of friends and undergo many adventures (starting with the Cedar Forest and the encounter with Humbaba).

When Enkidu is dying, he expresses his anger at Shamhat for making him civilized, blaming her for bringing him to the new world of experiences that has led to his death. He curses her to become an outcast. The god Shamash reminds Enkidu that Shamhat fed and clothed him before introducing him to Gilgamesh. Enkidu relents and blesses her, saying that all men will desire her and offer her gifts of jewels.

== Etymology ==
Shamhat's name means literally "the luscious one".
