= Enkidu =

Character from the Epic of Gilgamesh

Enkidu 𒂗𒆠𒄭
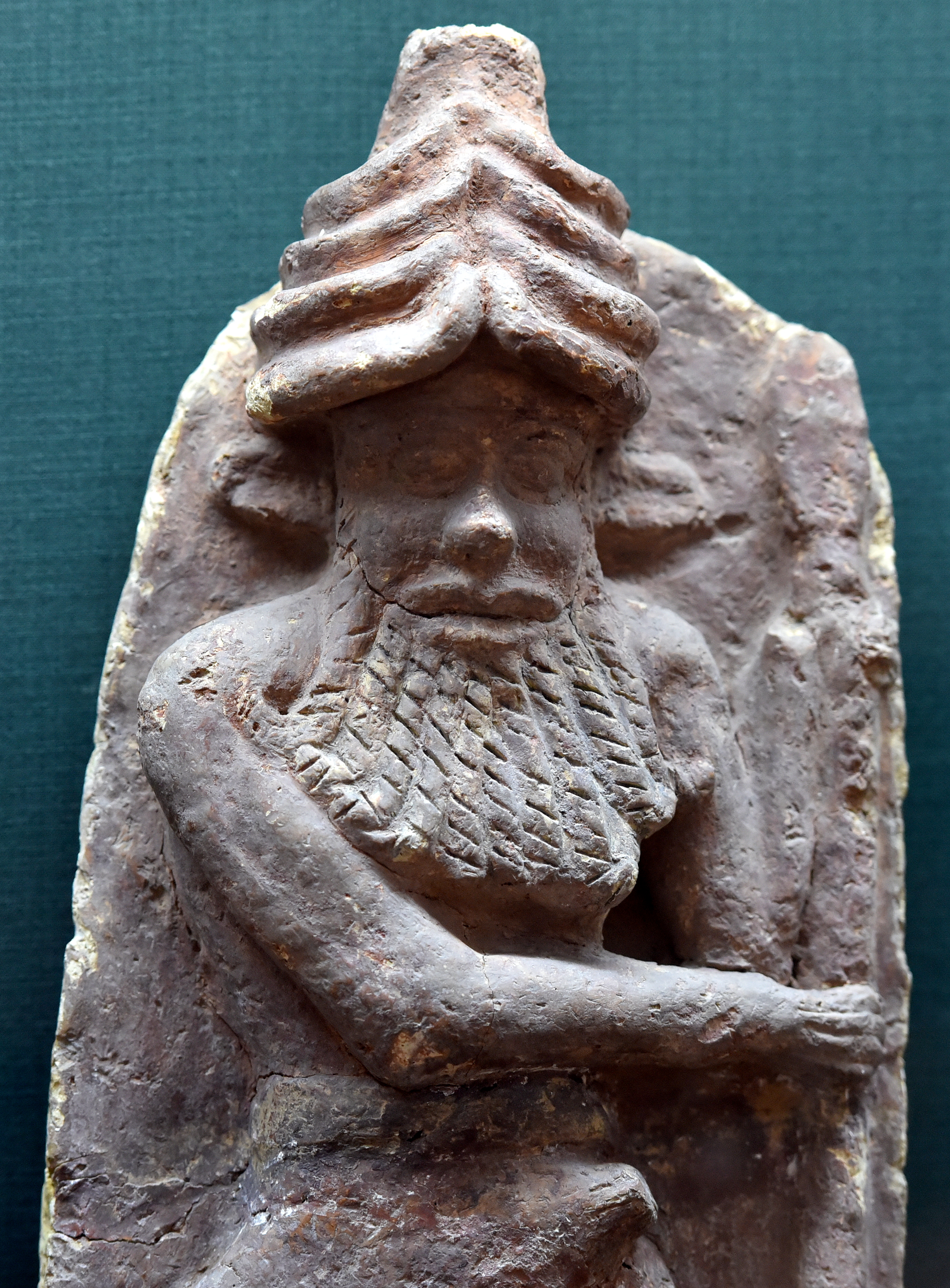
- Representation of Enkidu (2027–1763 BC) Aruru (creator)

Creature information
- Grouping: Mythic humanoids
- Sub grouping: Wild man
- Folklore: Ancient Mesopotamian religion

Origin
- Country: Uruk
- Region: Sumer
- Details: Steppe (formerly)

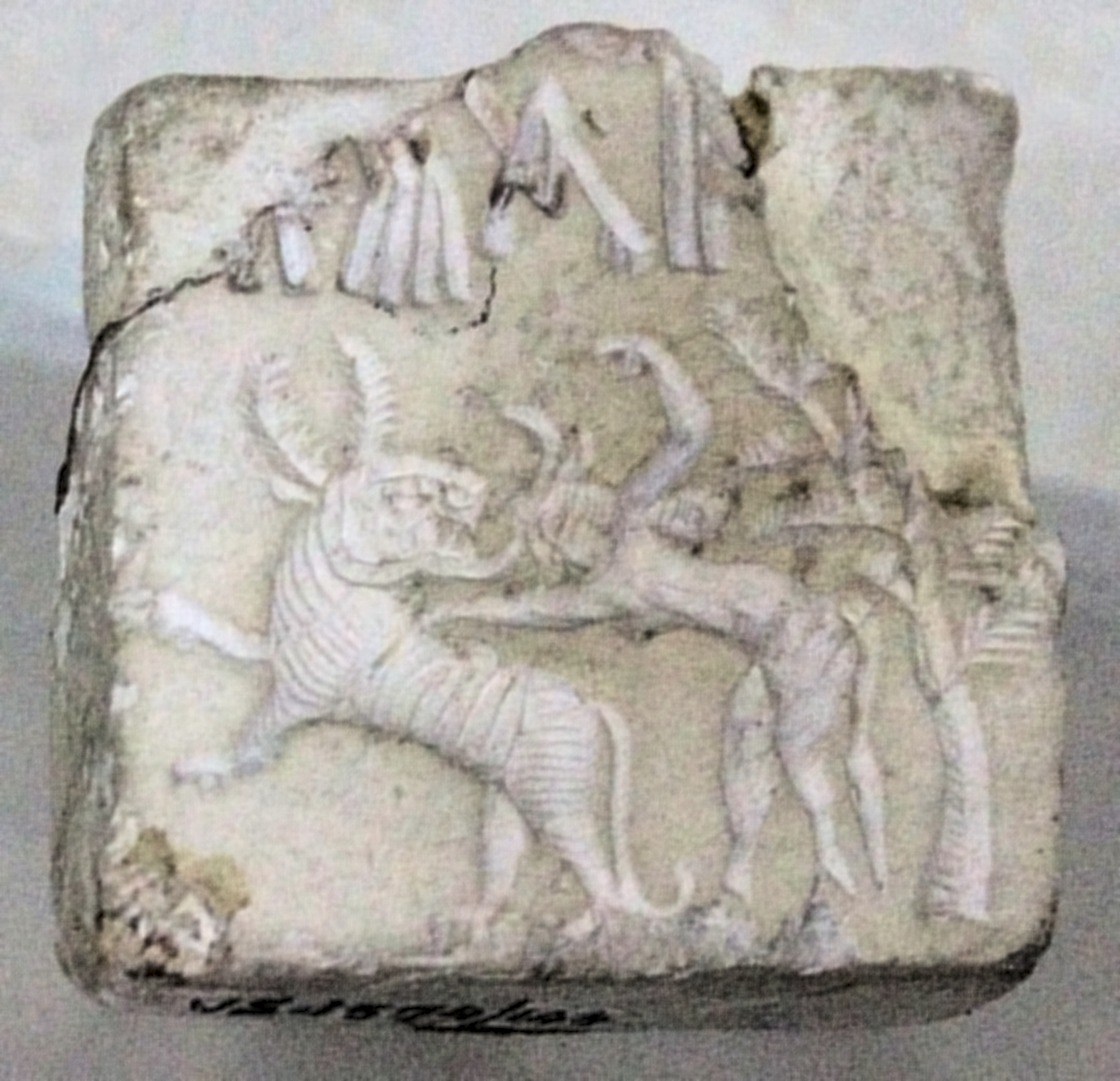
Fighting scene between a beast and a man with horns, hooves and a tail, who has been compared to the Mesopotamian bull-man, suggestive of Indus–Mesopotamia relations. Mohenjo-daro (seal 1357), Indus Valley civilization.

Enkidu (Sumerian: 𒂗𒆠𒄭 EN.KI.DU_{10}) was a legendary figure in ancient Mesopotamian mythology, wartime comrade and friend of Gilgamesh, king of Uruk. Their exploits were composed in Sumerian poems and in the Akkadian Epic of Gilgamesh, written during the 2nd millennium BC. He is the oldest literary representation of the wild man, a recurrent motif in artistic representations in Mesopotamia and in Ancient Near Eastern literature. The appearance of Enkidu as a primitive man seems to be a potential parallel of the Old Babylonian version (1300–1000 BC), in which he was depicted as a servant-warrior in the Sumerian poems.

There have been suggestions that he may be the "bull-man" shown in Mesopotamian art, having the head, arms, and body of a man, and the horns, ears, tail and legs of a bull. Thereafter a series of interactions with humans and human ways bring him closer to civilization, culminating in a wrestling match with Gilgamesh, king of Uruk. Enkidu embodies the wild or natural world. Though equal to Gilgamesh in strength and bearing, he acts in some ways as a foil to the cultured, city-bred warrior-king.

The tales of Enkidu’s servitude are narrated in five surviving Sumerian poems, developing from a slave of Gilgamesh into his "precious friend" and "companion" by the last poem. In the epic, Enkidu is created as a rival to king Gilgamesh, who tyrannizes his people, but they become friends and together slay the monster Humbaba and the Bull of Heaven; because of this, Enkidu is punished and dies, representing the mighty hero who dies early. The deep, tragic loss of Enkidu profoundly inspires in Gilgamesh a quest to escape death by obtaining godly immortality.

Enkidu has virtually no existence outside the stories relating to Gilgamesh. To the extent of current knowledge, he was never a god to be worshipped, and is absent from the lists of deities of ancient Mesopotamia. He seems to appear in an invocation from the Paleo-Babylonian era aimed at silencing a crying baby, a text which also evokes the fact that Enkidu would be held to have determined the measurement of the passage of time at night, apparently in relation to his role as herd keeper at night in the epic.

== Etymology ==
The name of Enkidu is Sumerian, and generally written in texts in this language by the sequence of signs en.ki.du10. The phrase ki.du10 (good place) is well attested in the Early Dynastic personal names, and the name en.ki.du10.ga (Lord of the good place) is cited on the Fara tablets. The lack of genitive or any grammatical element was common until the late third millennium. However, an alternative translation has been proposed as Creation of Enki.

In the epic, his name is preceded by the determinative sign of the divinity dingir 𒀭, which means that this character was considered to be of divine essence.

== Sumerian poems ==
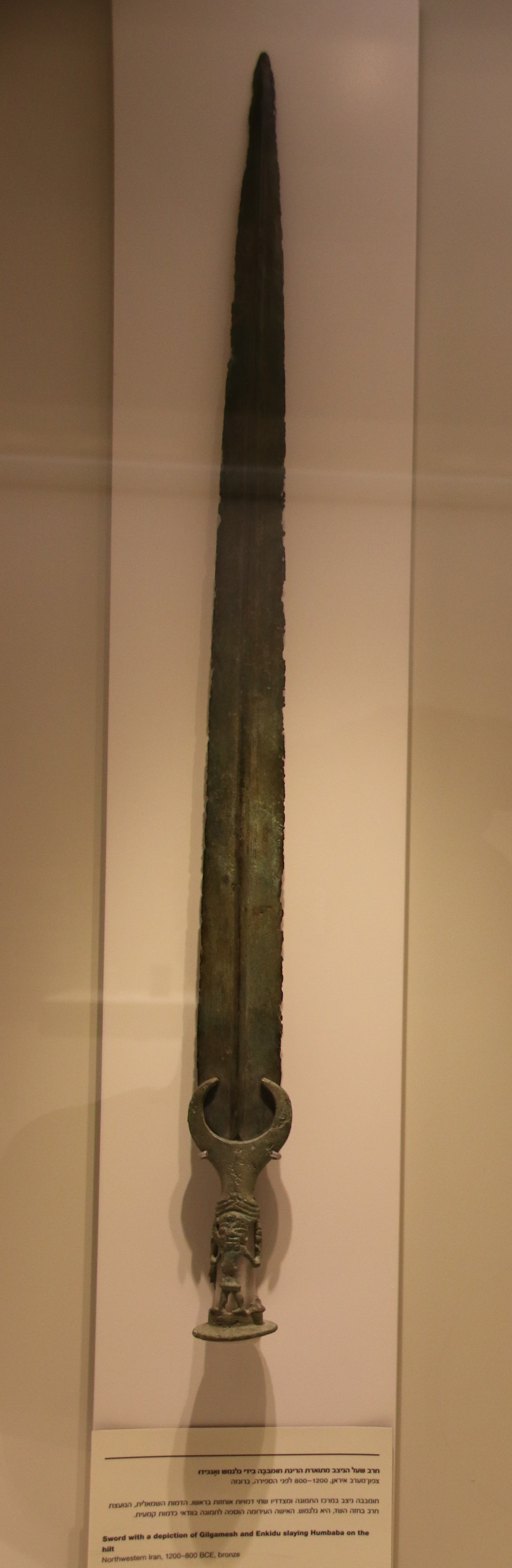
Bronze sword with hilt depicting Gilgamesh and Enkidu slaying Humbaba (1200-800 BC)

=== "The envoys of Agga" ===
Uruk refuses to participate in the digging of wells for the benefit of Kish, whose kingdom had the hegemony of Sumer. Its king Agga submits the city to a siege. Enkidu is sent to prepare the weapons and wait for Gilgamesh's order. After the battle, Gilgamesh defeats Agga, and makes him return, defeated and humiliated, to Kish.

=== "The lord to the Living One's Mountain" ===
Gilgamesh, disturbed by the death of his subjects and by the brevity of human existence, decides to make a name for himself. The king of Uruk and Enkidu make an expedition to the Forest of the Cedars, where, with Utu's blessing, they traverse seven mountains. Enkidu warns the king that the monster Huwawa inhabits the mountain region, armed by seven supernatural Auras. However, Gilgamesh has no fear, and his fifty men cut the trees until Huwawa appears. Gilgamesh offers him seven gifts in exchange for leaving his seven Auras, but it is a trap. He strikes Huwawa several times, who asks for mercy. Although Gilgamesh softens his heart, Enkidu nevertheless decapitates the monster. Enlil reproaches them for his death, and distributes the seven auras to the fields, the rivers, the reed-beds, the lions, the palace, the forest and Nungal, which would explain the fear and fascination they give to the humans.

=== "Hero in battle" ===
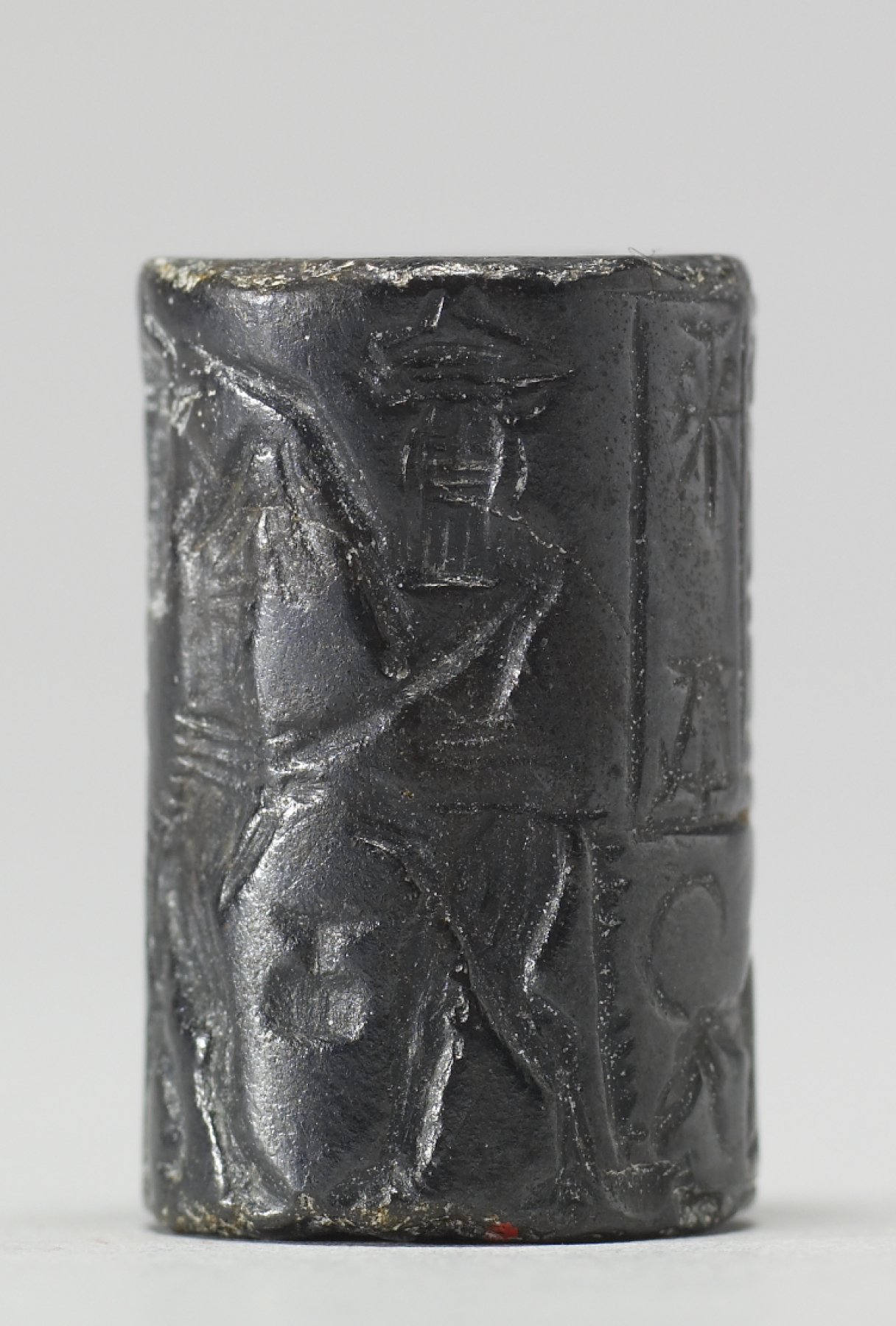
Cylinder seal with Enkidu vanquishing the Bull of Heaven - Walters 42786 - Side G

Inanna is enraged with Gilgamesh, she forbids him from administering justice in her temple, the Eanna, causing unrest in the environment of the King of Uruk. Finally, Inanna demands, with threats, from her father the Bull of Heaven to kill Gilgamesh. The bull is released in Uruk, whose insatiable hunger destroys crops and rivers. Enkidu grabs the bull by his tail and Gilgamesh smashes its head. Finally they distribute the meat among the poor and transform the horns into cups for ointments for the Eanna.

=== "Gilgamesh, Enkidu, and the Netherworld" ===
An oak tree grows on the banks of the Euphrates, the south wind blows it away and the goddess Inanna gathers it, planting it in her garden to use its wood as her throne. Suddenly, a snake takes refuge between its roots, a giant eagle on its top and a female demon between them.

Inanna asks her brother Utu for help, in vain, and then Gilgamesh. Gilgamesh cuts the tree, kills the serpent, expels the eagle to the mountain, and the demon to the desert. Inanna gives Gilgamesh a drum (ellag) and drumsticks (ekidma), in some versions a rod and a ring. Eventually they end up falling to the Netherworld.

Enkidu offers to recover them, but not before receiving instructions from Gilgamesh on how to behave in the underworld, to not seem alive in the residence of the dead. Enkidu however, ignores the directions; consequently, Enkidu ends up being held forever in the Netherworld.

After Gilgamesh pleads to the gods to set his companion free, Enki finally causes the shade of Enkidu to rise to briefly reunite with Gilgamesh. The latter interrogates the former (whom from now on he calls his "friend") the fate of the dead, Enkidu answers each of his questions. The text is lost here.

Did you see him who fell in battle?
I saw him [...] his father and mother are not there to hold his head, and his wife weeps.

=== "The great wild bull is lying down" ===
Gilgamesh is dying. The gods judge his exploits. After his position as future judge of the underworld has been revealed to him, he offers gifts and sacrifices to the gods. Then he takes comfort in the words of the gods; after death, he will be reunited with his family, his priests, his warriors and his best friend, Enkidu. Finally, he dies.

== Epic of Gilgamesh ==
The Akkadian epic Gilgamesh is found in various versions, including Surpassing all other kings (c. 1800 – c. 1600) and He who saw the Deep (c. 1300 – c. 1100), which was compiled by Sin-liqe-unninni from earlier texts, later discovered in the Library of Ashurbanipal in 1853.

=== Creation of Enkidu ===
Gilgamesh, king of Uruk, abuses his people. In response to complaints from the citizens, Anu, the supreme god, directs the goddess of fertility Aruru to create Enkidu in the steppe. Abundantly hairy and primitive, he lives roaming with the herds and grazing and drinking from rivers with the beasts. One day a hunter watches Enkidu destroying the traps he has prepared for the animals. The hunter informs his father, who sends him to Uruk to ask Gilgamesh for help. The king sends Shamhat, a sacred prostitute, who seduces and teaches Enkidu. After two weeks with her, he becomes human, intelligent and understanding words, however the beasts flee when they see him. Shamhat convinces Enkidu to face the tyrant Gilgamesh in combat. Meanwhile, in Uruk, the king has two dreams prophesying the arrival of his enemy.

=== Enkidu faces Gilgamesh ===
Enkidu learns to behave like a man with the shepherds eating, drinking and defending them from wolves and lions at night. Upon reaching Uruk, Enkidu blocks the path of Gilgamesh who was going to sleep with a newlywed. Enraged, they fight brutally until the two end up tired, but at the end both appreciate each other's strength, and decide to be friends. Enkidu is depressed by having abandoned his old wild life, to which Gilgamesh proposes an expedition to the Cedar Forest to kill Humbaba. But his friend explains that he knew the forest while he was a wild being, and that the expedition is dangerous. At the end, Gilgamesh decides to march without fear. The decision is acclaimed by the citizens of Uruk, but not by the elders and advisers. Faced with Gilgamesh's disregard, the elders charge Enkidu to protect their king.

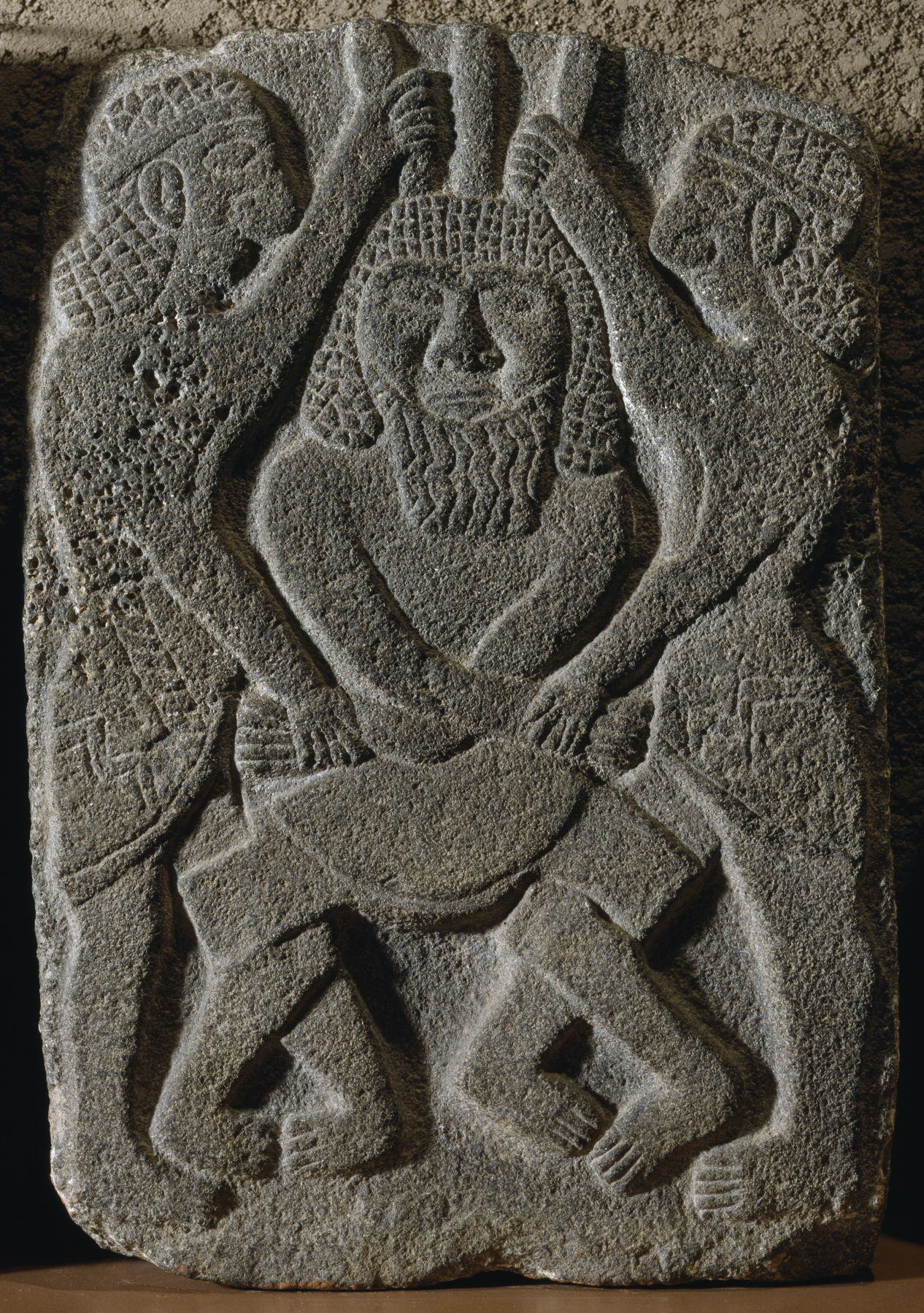
Neo-Hittite relief of King Kapara (c. 950 – c. 875 BC). Two heroes pin down a bearded foe, while grabbing at his pronged headdress. The context may be related to the Gilgamesh epic, and display Gilgamesh and Enkidu in their fight with Humbaba.

The one who goes on ahead saves the comrade.
The one who knows the route protects his friend.'Let Enkidu go ahead of you; he knows the road to the Cedar Forest.

In this same episode the goddess Ninsun adopts Enkidu and also entrusts him with protecting the king.

=== The forest of Humbaba ===
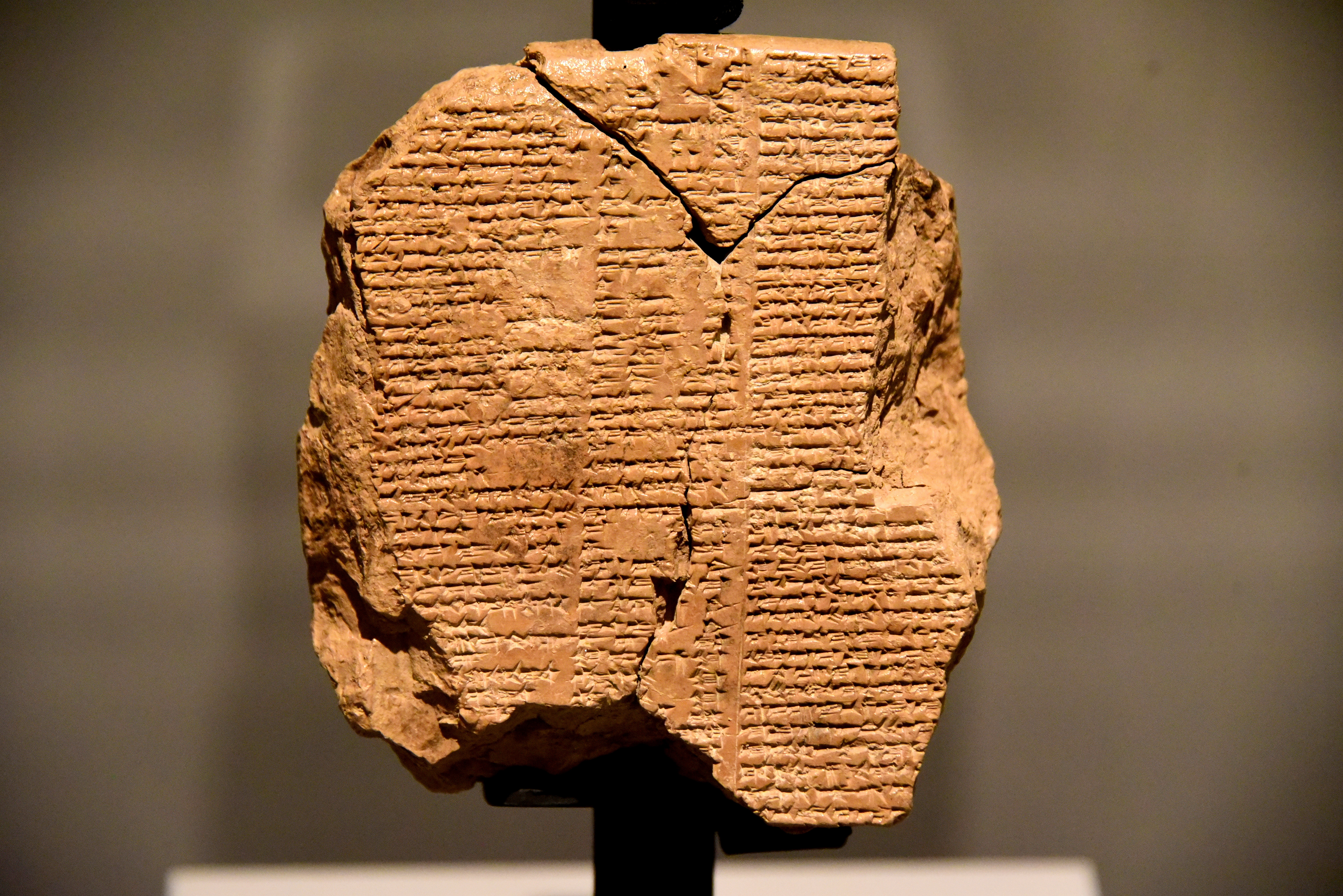
Tablet V of the Epic of Gilgamesh, discovered in 2015. It describes encountering Humbaba at the Cedar Forest.

Ninsun, the mother of Gilgamesh adopts Enkidu as her son, and seeks protection of the sun-god Shamash (the protector of the Uruk dynasty). Gilgamesh and Enkidu journey to the Cedar Forest. They perform a dream ritual in every mountain they cross; although dreams are representations of Humbaba (falling mountains, a thunderbird that breathes fire...), Enkidu interprets them as good omens. At the entrance to the forest they hear the fearsome bellow of Humbaba, which petrifies them with fear.

Humbaba descends from the mountain face to face with both heroes, there accuses Enkidu of betrayal against the beasts and threatens Gilgamesh to disembowel him and feed his flesh to the birds. Gilgamesh is terrified, but Enkidu encourages him, and the battle begins. First, Gilgamesh strikes Humbaba so hard it splits the Mount Hermon in two, and the skies turn black and start “raining death”. Shamash binds Humbaba with 13 winds and he is captured. Humbaba pleads for his life, offers to be his slave and to cut the sacred trees for him, Gilgamesh pities him, but Enkidu argues that his death will establish his reputation forever. Humbaba then curses both heroes, but they strike him, decapitating him. They cut down cedars and a gigantic tree that Enkidu plans to use for a gate for the temple of Enlil. They return home along the Euphrates with the trees and the head of Humbaba.

=== Ishtar's seduction ===
The goddess Ishtar, fascinated by the beauty of Gilgamesh, offers to be his wife in exchange for wealth and fame; these offerings do not sway Gilgamesh, who recalls all the misadventures her previous loves had, such as Tammuz.

Ishtar, furious and crying, goes to her father Anu, to demand the Bull of Heaven take revenge, or she will scream so loudly that the dead will devour the living. Anu, in fear, gives her the Bull from Heaven in exchange for preparing food for the seven years of famine that the city will suffer from the destruction of the bull. Ishtar obeys (or lies) and releases the bull in Uruk, which kills a large percentage of people. Enkidu grabs the bull by the horns and Gilgamesh stabs his neck. Hearing Ishtar's cry, Enkidu ridicules the goddess by throwing a bull's leg at her head. The city prepares a great celebration at night.

=== Death of Enkidu ===
Enkidu has a dream where the gods decide that the heroes must die, since they have killed Humbaba and the Bull of Heaven. Samash protests against the decision, but that does not change anything, and Enkidu is sentenced to death. This makes Enkidu curse the door he built with the wood of the forest and Shamhat, for having changed his wild life. However then he repents and blesses her. He discusses his nightmares with Gilgamesh about witnessing before Ereshkigal, the queen of the underworld. After this, sick and bedridden for twelve days, he asks Gilgamesh not to forget him. Finally, he dies.

Gilgamesh calls upon the mountains and all of Uruk to mourn for his friend. He recalls their adventures together, makes a funerary statue of Enkidu and provides grave gifts, so Enkidu has a favourable life in the realm of the dead. Enkidu is buried in the river, like Gilgamesh in the Sumerian poem.

=== Enkidu's descent to the Underworld ===
There is another non-canonical tablet in which Enkidu journeys into the underworld, but many scholars consider the tablet to be a sequel or add-on to the original epic inspired by the Sumerian poem Gilgamesh, Enkidu and the Netherworld.

== Symbolism ==
=== Enkidu's wild life ===
It has often been suggested that these descriptions reflect the semi-nomadic Amorites who, from their homeland in the Syrian Desert, infiltrated southern Mesopotamia and came to dominate it in the early second millennium. The phraseology generally includes a reference to "not knowing", which is also used in the epic. Comparing their behaviour to animals, "people plotting destruction like beasts, like wolves". However, Amorites ate uncooked meat and lived in tents while Enkidu lived in the steppe and ate grass; meaning there is no correlation between both since Enkidu wasn’t even a human yet. However, Morris Jastrow suggested that Enkidu's early life was modeled on a tradition that can be seen in etiological texts, in parallel to the description of Enkidu.

The Dispute Between Cattle and Grain
𒉆𒇽𒍇 𒌓 𒊑𒀀𒆤𒉈 𒃻 𒅥𒅇𒁉 𒉡𒈬𒌦𒍪𒀀𒀭 𒌆𒂵 𒈬𒈬𒁉 𒉡𒈬𒌦𒍪𒍑 𒌦 𒄑𒁺𒈾 𒋢𒁉 𒈬𒌦𒁺 𒇻𒄀 𒅗𒁀 𒌑 𒈬𒉌𒅁𒅥 𒀀 𒊬𒊬 𒊏𒅗 𒄿𒅎𒅘𒅘𒉌	nam-lu2-ulu3 ud re-a-ke4-ne ninda gu7-u3-bi nu-mu-un-zu-uc-am3 tug2-ga mu4-mu4-bi nu-mu-un-zu-uc-am3 kalam jic-gen-na su-bi mu-un-jen udu-gin7 ka-ba u2 mu-ni-ib-gu7 a mu2-sar-ra-ka i-im-na8-na8-ne	Mankind of that time, Knew not the eating of bread, Knew not the wearing of garments, The people went around with skins on their bodies, They ate grass with their mouths like sheep, Drank water from ditches.

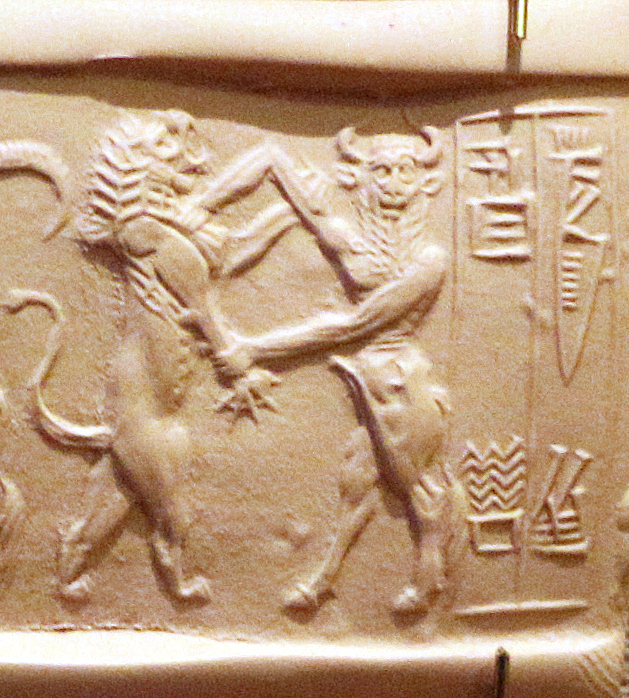
Possible depiction of Enkidu as a bull-man, fighting a lion, Akkadian Empire seal, circa 2200 BC.

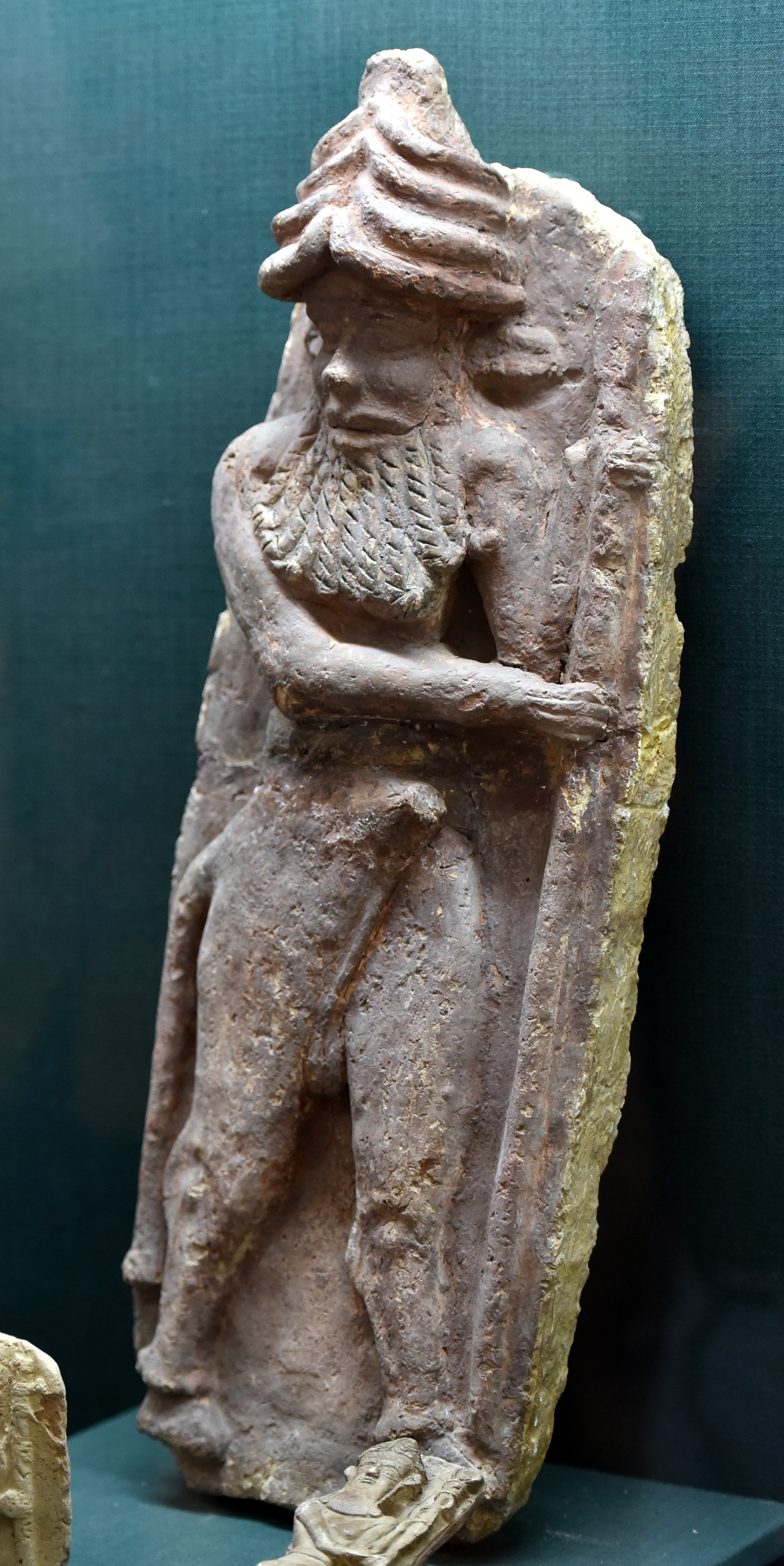
Enkidu, Gilgamesh's friend. From Ur, Iraq. 2027–1763 BC. Iraq Museum

=== Becoming human ===
After bouts of love-making with Shamhat over two weeks, Enkidu tries to reunite with his herd. But the gazelles run from him, indicating that he is not accepted any more amongst the savage kind. Enkidu has lost his primitive nature, such as running as fast as a gazelle.

We can see here the motif of transferring negative or positive qualities (weakness or knowledge) from one being to another through intimate contact. Another motif is the role of women as seducer towards civilization, such as Adam and Eve in Genesis 3. By offering Adam the fruit of the tree of knowledge, Eve ultimately drew him to a life of sin and turmoil with Eve being to the pain of childbirth.

Jastrow and Clay are of the opinion that the story of Enkidu was originally a separate tale to illustrate "man's career and destiny, how through intercourse with a woman he awakens to the sense of human dignity..."

=== Civilization against nomadic life ===
There is a theme that contrasts life with human culture and the life without. It can be seen when Enkidu curses Shamhat, because she took him away from the wild life and brought him to civilization, leading to his death. The sun god Shamash convinces him that he had a new life worth enjoying.

Why, Ο Enkidu, do you curse the harlot Shamhat,
Who made you eat food fit for divinity,
Who gave you to drink wine fit for royalty,
Who clothed you with noble garments,
And made you have fair Gilgamesh for a comrade?

The same theme appears when the barmaid advises Gilgamesh to abandon his search for immortality.

As for you, Gilgamesh [...]
Let your head be washed; bathe in water.
Pay heed to a little one that holds on to your hand;
Let a spouse delight in your bosom.

As Jeffrey H. Tigay wrote in his book, The Evolution of the Gilgamesh Epic:

The rise of Enkidu to human culture underlines the values preferred by the epic. This preference may help explain the epic's enduring attraction. While military feats were for the few, the simple pleasures advocated by the barmaid were something many could strive for.

== Modern rediscovery ==
The first translation of the Epic of Gilgamesh was produced in the early 1870s by George Smith, a scholar at the British Museum, who published the Flood story from Tablet XI in 1880 under the title The Chaldean Account of Genesis. There, Enkidu's name was originally misread as Eabani.

== See also ==
- Gilgamesh in popular culture
- Master of Animals
- Enkidu (crater)
