= Bull of Heaven =

Figure in ancient Mesopotamian mythology

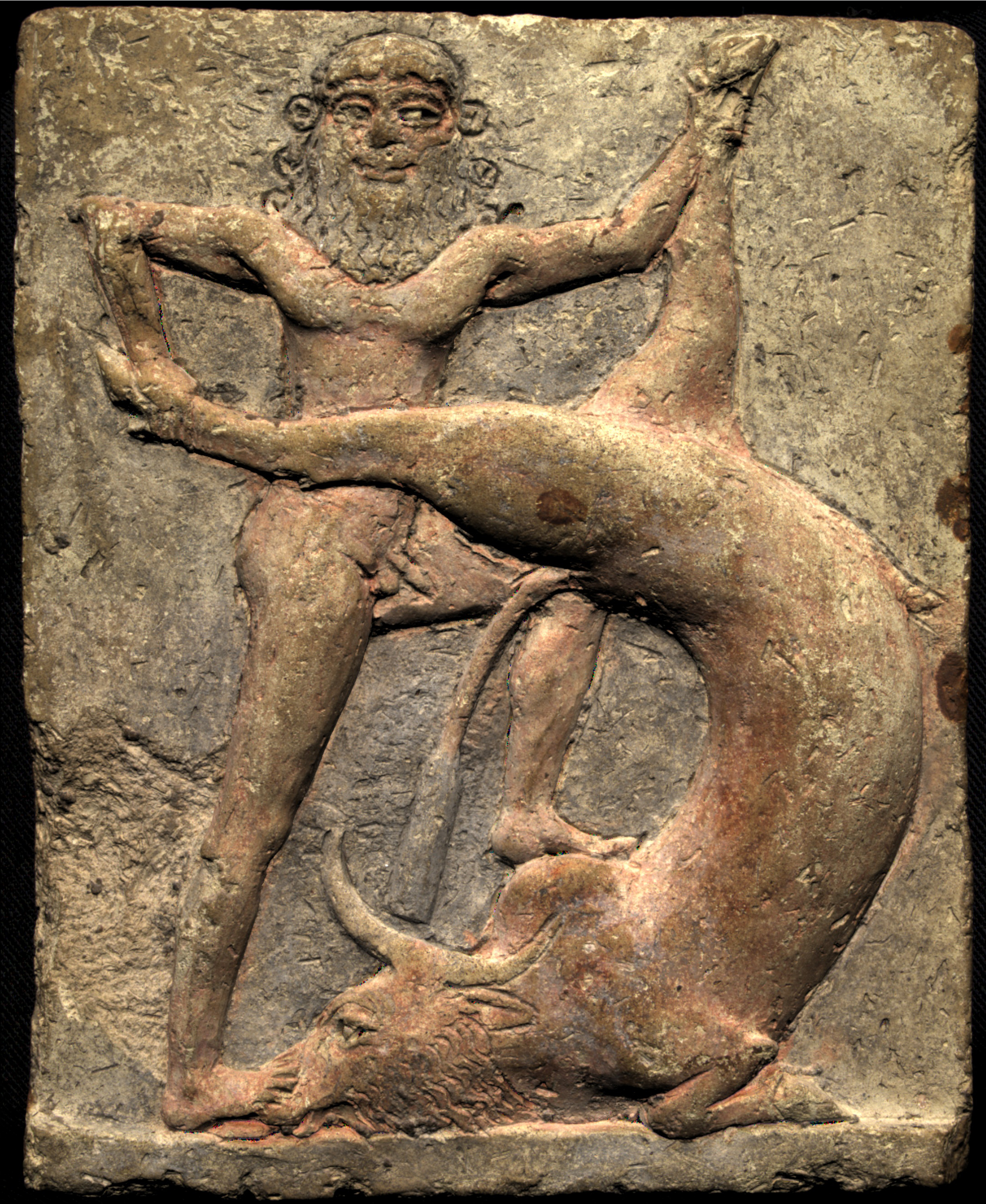
Ancient Mesopotamian terracotta relief (c. 2250 – 1900 BC) showing Gilgamesh slaying the Bull of Heaven, an episode described in Tablet VI of the Epic of Gilgamesh

In ancient Mesopotamian mythology, the Bull of Heaven is a mythical beast fought by the King of Uruk Gilgamesh. The story of the Bull of Heaven is known from two different versions: one recorded in an earlier Sumerian poem and a later episode in the Standard Babylonian (a literary dialect of Akkadian) Epic of Gilgamesh. In the Sumerian poem, the Bull is sent to attack Gilgamesh by the goddess Inanna for reasons that are unclear.

The more complete Akkadian account comes from Tablet VI of the Epic of Gilgamesh, in which Gilgamesh refuses the sexual advances of the goddess Ishtar, the East Semitic equivalent of Inanna, leading the enraged Ishtar to demand the Bull of Heaven from her father Anu, so that she may send it to attack Gilgamesh in Uruk. Anu gives her the Bull and she sends it to attack Gilgamesh and his companion, the hero Enkidu, who slay the Bull together.

After defeating the Bull, Enkidu hurls the Bull's right thigh at Ishtar, taunting her. The slaying of the Bull results in the gods condemning Enkidu to death, an event which catalyzes Gilgamesh's fear for his own death, which drives the remaining portion of the epic. The Bull was identified with the constellation Taurus and the myth of its slaying may have held astronomical significance to the ancient Mesopotamians. Aspects of the story have been compared to later tales from the ancient Near East, including legends from Ugarit, the tale of Joseph in the Book of Genesis, and parts of the ancient Greek epics, the Iliad and the Odyssey.

== Mythology ==
=== Gilgamesh and the Bull of Heaven ===
In the Sumerian poem Gilgamesh and the Bull of Heaven, Gilgamesh and Enkidu slay the Bull of Heaven, who has been sent to attack them by the goddess Inanna, the Sumerian equivalent of Ishtar. The plot of this poem differs substantially from the corresponding scene in the later Akkadian Epic of Gilgamesh. In the Sumerian poem, Inanna does not seem to ask Gilgamesh to become her consort as she does in the later Akkadian epic. Furthermore, while she is coercing her father An to give her the Bull of Heaven, rather than threatening to raise the dead to eat the living as she does in the later epic, she merely threatens to let out a "cry" that will reach the earth.

=== Epic of Gilgamesh ===
In Tablet VI of the standard Akkadian Epic of Gilgamesh, after Gilgamesh repudiates her sexual advances, Ishtar goes to Heaven, where she complains to her mother Antu and her father Anu. She demands that Anu give her the Bull of Heaven and threatens that, if he refuses, she will smash the gates of the Underworld and raise the dead to eat the living. Anu at first objects to Ishtar's demand, insisting that the Bull of Heaven is so destructive that its release would result in seven years of famine. Ishtar declares that she has stored up enough grain for all people and all animals for the next seven years. Eventually, Anu reluctantly agrees to give it to Ishtar, whereupon she unleashes it on the world, causing mass destruction.

The Bull's first breath blows a hole in the ground so large that one hundred men fall into it, while its second breath creates a hole larger still, which traps two hundred more. Gilgamesh and Enkidu work together to slay the Bull; Enkidu goes behind the Bull and pulls its tail while Gilgamesh thrusts his sword into the Bull's neck, killing it. Gilgamesh and Enkidu offer the Bull's heart to the sun-god Shamash. While Gilgamesh and Enkidu are resting, Ishtar stands up on the walls of Uruk and curses Gilgamesh. Enkidu tears off the Bull's right thigh and throws it at Ishtar's face.

Ishtar calls together "the crimped courtesans, prostitutes and harlots" and orders them to mourn for the Bull of Heaven. Meanwhile, Gilgamesh holds a celebration over the Bull of Heaven's defeat. Tablet VII begins with Enkidu recounting a dream in which he saw Anu, Ea, and Shamash declare that either Gilgamesh or Enkidu must die as punishment for having slain the Bull of Heaven. They choose Enkidu, who soon grows sick, and dies after having a dream of the Underworld. Tablet VIII describes Gilgamesh's inconsolable grief over his friend's death and the details of Enkidu's funeral. Enkidu's death becomes the catalyst for Gilgamesh's fear of his own death, which is the focus of the remaining portion of the epic.

== Symbolism and representation ==
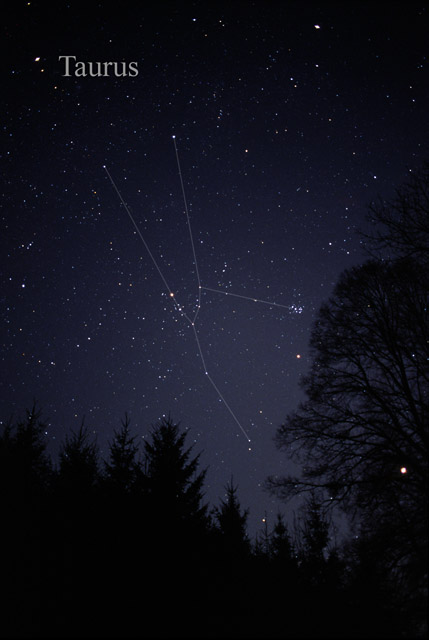
The Bull of Heaven was identified with the constellation Taurus.

Numerous depictions of the slaying of the Bull of Heaven occur in extant works of ancient Mesopotamian art. Representations are especially common on cylinder seals of the Akkadian Empire (c. 2334 – 2154 BC). These show that the Bull was clearly envisioned as a bull of abnormally large size and ferocity. It is unclear exactly what the Bull of Heaven represents, however. Assyriologists Jeremy Black and Anthony Green observe that the Bull of Heaven is identified with the constellation Taurus and argue that the reason why Enkidu hurls the bull's thigh at Ishtar in the Epic of Gilgamesh after defeating it may be an effort to explain why the constellation seems to be missing its hind quarters.

Gordon and Rendsburg note that the notion of flinging a bull's leg at someone "as a terrible insult" is attested across a wide geographic area of the ancient Near East and that it recurs in the Odyssey, an ancient Greek epic poem. Some scholars consider the Bull of Heaven to be the same figure as Gugalanna, the husband of Ereshkigal mentioned by Inanna in Inanna's Descent into the Underworld.

== Influence on later stories ==
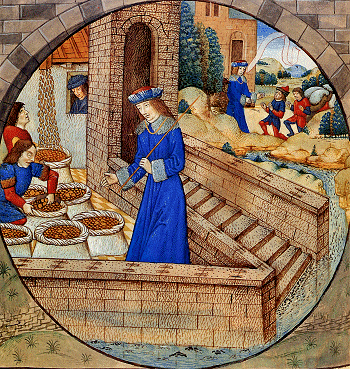
Ishtar's storing up of seven years' worth of grain has similarities to the account of Joseph found in Biblical and Quranic accounts.

Cyrus H. Gordon and Gary A. Rendsburg note that the Near Eastern motif of seven years of famine following the death of a hero is attested in the Ugaritic myth of the death of Aqhat and that the theme of someone predicting seven years of famine in advance and storing up supplies is also found in the Hebrew story of Joseph from the Book of Genesis, and in verses 47-48 of Surah Yusuf in the Quran.

According to the German classical scholar Walter Burkert, the scene in which Ishtar comes before Anu to demand the Bull of Heaven after being rejected by Gilgamesh is directly paralleled by a scene from Book V of the Iliad. In the Epic of Gilgamesh, Ishtar complains to her mother Antu, but is mildly rebuked by Anu. In the scene from the Iliad, Aphrodite, the later Greek development of Ishtar, is wounded by the Greek hero Diomedes while trying to save her son Aeneas. She flees to Mount Olympus, where she cries to her mother Dione, is mocked by her sister Athena, and is mildly rebuked by her father Zeus. Not only is the narrative parallel significant, but so is the fact that Dione's name is a feminization of Zeus's own, just as Antu is a feminine form of Anu. Dione does not appear throughout the rest of the Iliad, in which Zeus's consort is instead the goddess Hera. Burkert therefore concludes that Dione is a calque of Antu.

British classical scholar Graham Anderson notes that, in the Odyssey, Odysseus's men kill the sacred cattle of Helios and are condemned to death by the gods for this reason, much like Enkidu in the Epic of Gilgamesh. M. L. West states that the similarities run deeper than the mere fact that, in both cases, the creatures slain are bovines exempt from natural death. In both cases, the person or persons condemned to die are companions of the hero, whose death or deaths force the hero to continue his journey alone. He also notes that, in both cases, the epic describes a discussion among the gods over whether or not the guilty party must die and that Helios's threat to Zeus if he does not avenge the slaughter of his cattle in the Odyssey is very similar to Ishtar's threat to Anu when she is demanding the Bull in the Epic of Gilgamesh.

Bruce Louden compares Enkidu's taunting of Ishtar immediately after slaying the Bull of Heaven to Odysseus's taunt of the giant Polyphemus in Book IX of the Odyssey. In both cases, the hero's own hubris after an apparent victory leads a deity to curse him.
