= Dumuzid the Fisherman =

King of Uruk

Dumuzid 𒌉𒍣𒋗𒄩
- First appearance: Sumerian King List c. 2000 BC

In-universe information
- Occupation: King of Uruk (reigned 100 years)

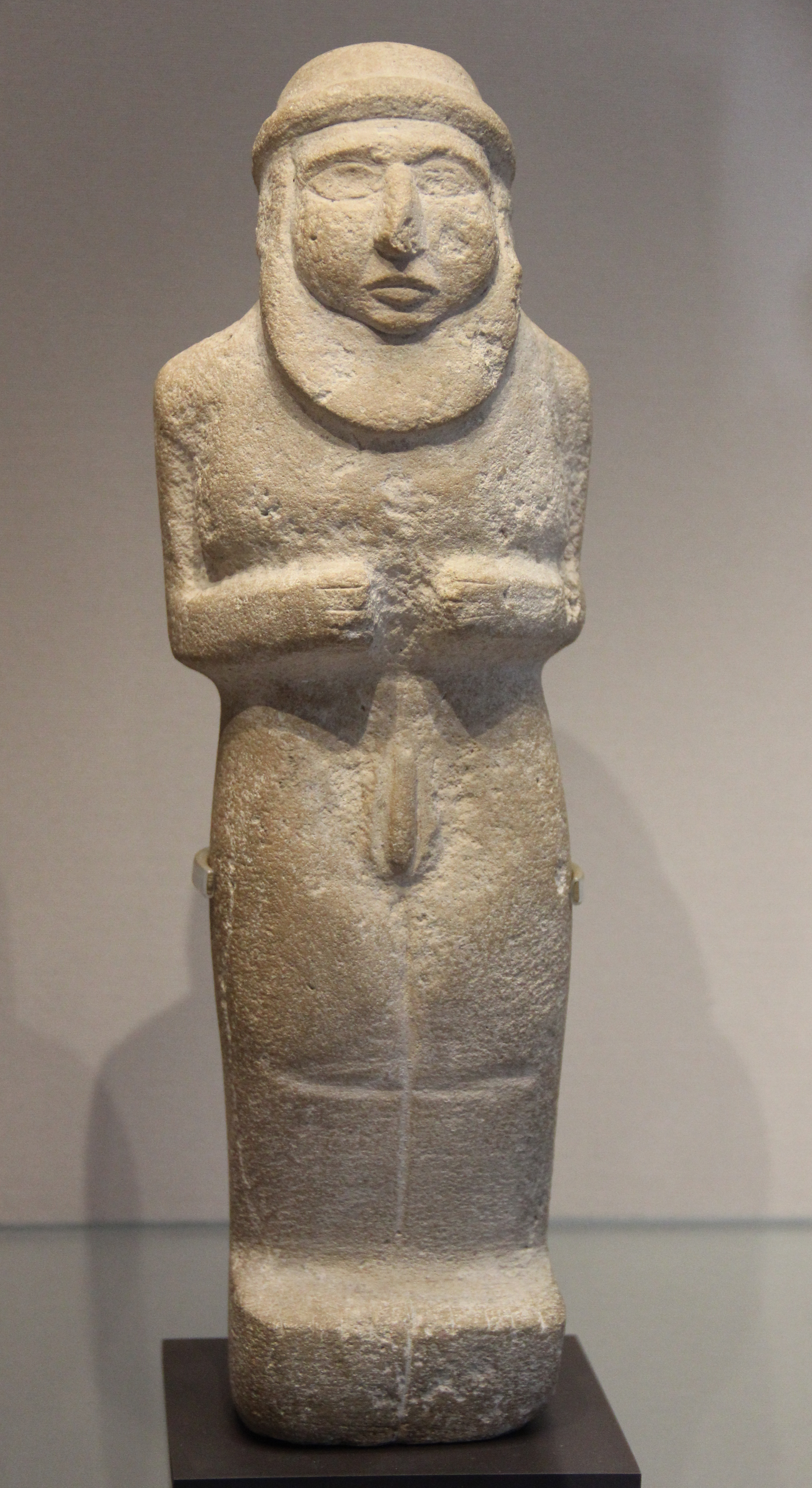
Figure of a priest king from the Uruk period (c. 3300 BC)

Dumuzid, (Note: Derived from the Sumerian words meaning "faithful son".) titled the Fisherman, (Note: Sumerian: 𒌉𒍣𒋗𒄩, romanized: Dumuzid šukud) was a legendary Sumerian king of Uruk listed originating from Kuara. According to legend, in the 100th year of his reign, he was captured by Enmebaragesi.

== Sumerian King List ==
The primary source of information comes from the Sumerian King List:

Dumuzid, the fisherman, whose city was Kuara, ruled for 100 years. (Note: Some versions mention 110 years.)
He (Dumuzid) was taken captive by the (single hand of Enmebaragesi). (Note: Addition only found in the C version of the SKL.)

According to scholars, the sequence of the first Uruk dynasty was fabricated during the Ur III period, which didn't include comments about some rulers. The fabrication of king Dumuzid could have been derived from an ideological representation of the positional relationship, thought to have been practiced by the Ur III kings and their predecessors to Dumuzid in the myth of the holy wedding, and was added as a symbol of this act.

To be able to distinguish him from the god Dumuzid, the profession of fisherman and the origin from Kuara were assigned to him, probably from a cult in Kuara, where there is evidence of a temple of Dumuzid. The C version of the Sumerian King List contains the ending of his reign in hands of Enmebaragesi, this addition has been interpreted as a subsequent addition, which would give historical weight and justify the lack of expansion in the literary texts.

== Possible role in the Tale of Gudam ==
The Tale of Gudam is known from a single, one column tablet inscribed with 37 lines. The composition starts with the preparation of a festival for Inanna, in which Gudam participates, although his role remains doubtful. Gudam decides to ravage the city of Uruk, but is defeated by the little fisherman of Inanna.

It has been suggested that the "little fisherman of Inanna" was a corruption from the original reading of "the fisherman Dumuzi(d), the fisherman of Inanna(k)". However, this possibility cannot be conclusively proposed, and the identity of the fisherman ultimately remains unknown.

== See also ==
- Sumerian King List
- History of Sumer
- Uruk

== Notes ==
Regnal titles
Preceded by Lugalbanda	Lugal of Sumer; En of Uruk legendary	Succeeded by Gilgamesh
