= Shulgi =

21st-century BC Sumerian king

Shulgi 𒀭𒂄𒄀
- King of Sumer and Akkad; King of the Four Corners of the World
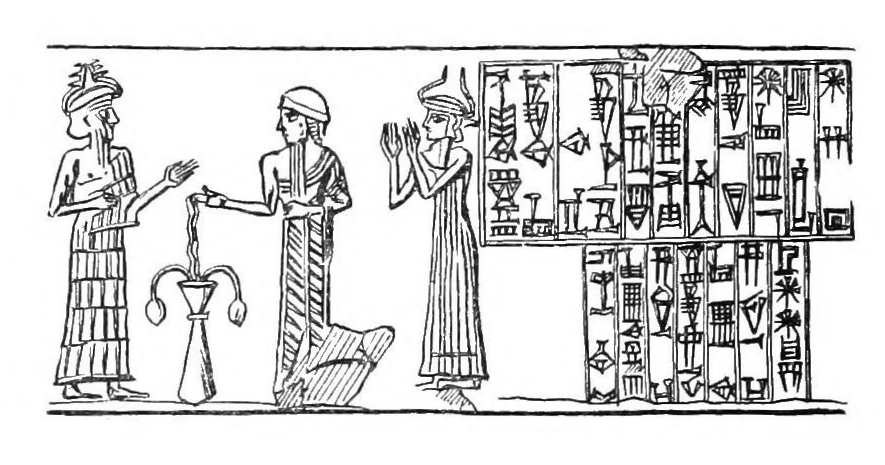
- Cylinder seal of one of Shulgi's officials, Ur-Nanibgal. Louvre Museum.

King of Ur
- Reign: c. 2094 – c. 2046 BC
- Predecessor: Ur-Nammu
- Successor: Amar-Sin
- Died: c. 2046 BC
- Spouse: Taram-Uram: Shulgi-simti; Nin-kalla; Ea-niša
- Issue: Etel-pu-Dagan; Amar-Da-mu; Lu-Nanna; Lugal-a-zi-da; Ur-Suen; Pes-tur-tur; Sat-Kukuti; Taram-Sulgi
- Dynasty: 3rd Dynasty of Ur
- Father: Ur-Nammu
- Mother: Watartum

Shulgi (𒀭𒂄𒄀; Sumerian Šulgi(r) or Šulge(r), meaning something like “Noble Youth” or “Native Youth”), king of the Third Dynasty of Ur (abbreviated as Ur III) in Mesopotamia, son and successor of Ur-Namma, reigned for 48 years, ca. 2092-2045 BC.

He succeeded his father, who had died in battle after founding a new kingdom that dominated all of Lower Mesopotamia. The first two decades of his reign were devoted to consolidating the administration and cults at the major sanctuaries of Sumer. After the 20th year of his reign, a turning point began with the start of a series of military campaigns toward the north and east of the kingdom and the implementation of various reforms that would reshape the kingdom, making it more centralized and giving it an 'imperial' character. This was reflected in particular by the development of an impressive administrative apparatus (often described as 'bureaucratic'), which produced thousands of accounting tablets, controlled the major estates, and organized the circulation of resources throughout the kingdom from several major centers, notably Puzrish-Dagan.

Shulgi had himself deified, and his cult was established in several cities, while he sponsored the composition of a royal literature in Sumerian, characterized by hymns singing his glory, in which he appears as a figure of divine descent, chosen and blessed by the great gods of the kingdom from birth, possessing the qualities of the perfect king (vigor, strength, wisdom, omniscience). He relied on his family to rule: his sons held important positions in the army and provincial administration, while his daughters became priestesses at major shrines or were married to close servants of the king or to foreign rulers. The kingdom was organized like a sort of extended family, with the king at its head as patriarch. He devised an active diplomatic policy to ensure peace with his most powerful neighbors, while sending his armies on campaigns nearly every year during the latter part of his reign, primarily in the western Zagros regions, which controlled important trade routes and grazing lands, establishing garrisons to consolidate his hold. He also built a defensive system in the northern part of Lower Mesopotamia to protect the heart of his kingdom.

His son Amar-Sin (c. 2044–2036 BC) succeeded him. The kingdom of Ur continued to prosper for about twenty years after Shulgi’s death, then began to decline and disappeared around 2000 BC.

Shulgi is considered one of the most important kings of the history of ancient Mesopotamia, particularly due to the significance of his administrative achievements and the propaganda literature he commissioned, which is known from numerous copies dating from long after his reign, even though the practice of deifying the king was lost over time. He remained an important figure, referenced in several literary works until the end of Mesopotamian civilization.

== Sources ==
=== Inscriptions ===
Shulgi’s reign is documented by several royal inscriptions, official texts commemorating the king’s major achievements. These consist mainly of short foundation inscriptions unearthed in shrines whose building or restoration he commissioned, or in copies made of them in antiquity. Three inscriptions commemorating the military victories of a king of Ur, who may have been Shulgi, are known from later copies.

King Shulgi foundation tablet

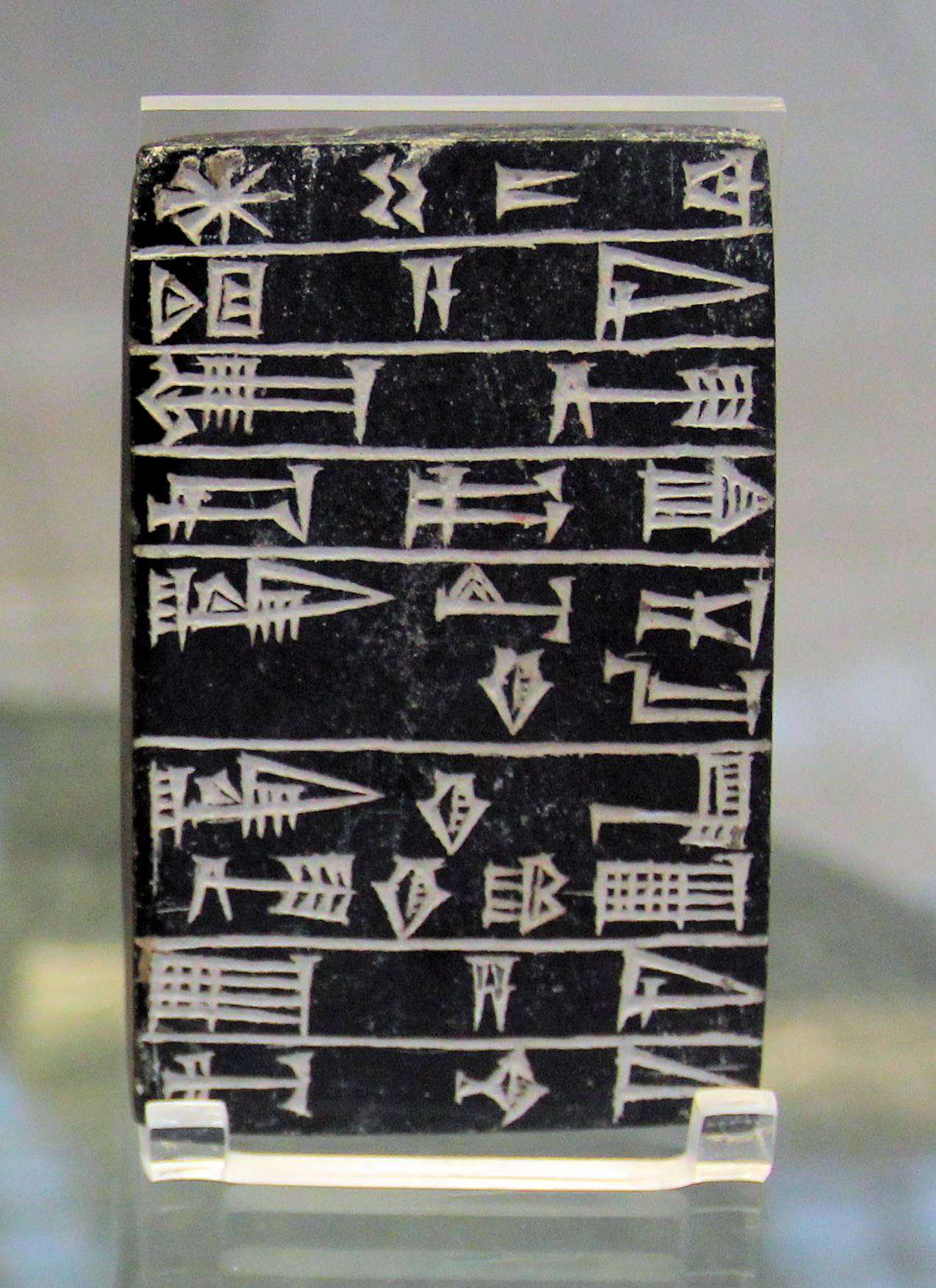
𒀭 𒐏𒋰𒁀
𒎏𒀀𒉌
𒂄𒄀
𒍑𒆗𒂵
𒈗 𒋀𒀊𒆠𒈠
𒈗𒆠𒂗
𒄀𒆠𒌵𒆤
𒂍𒀀𒉌
𒈬𒈾𒆕

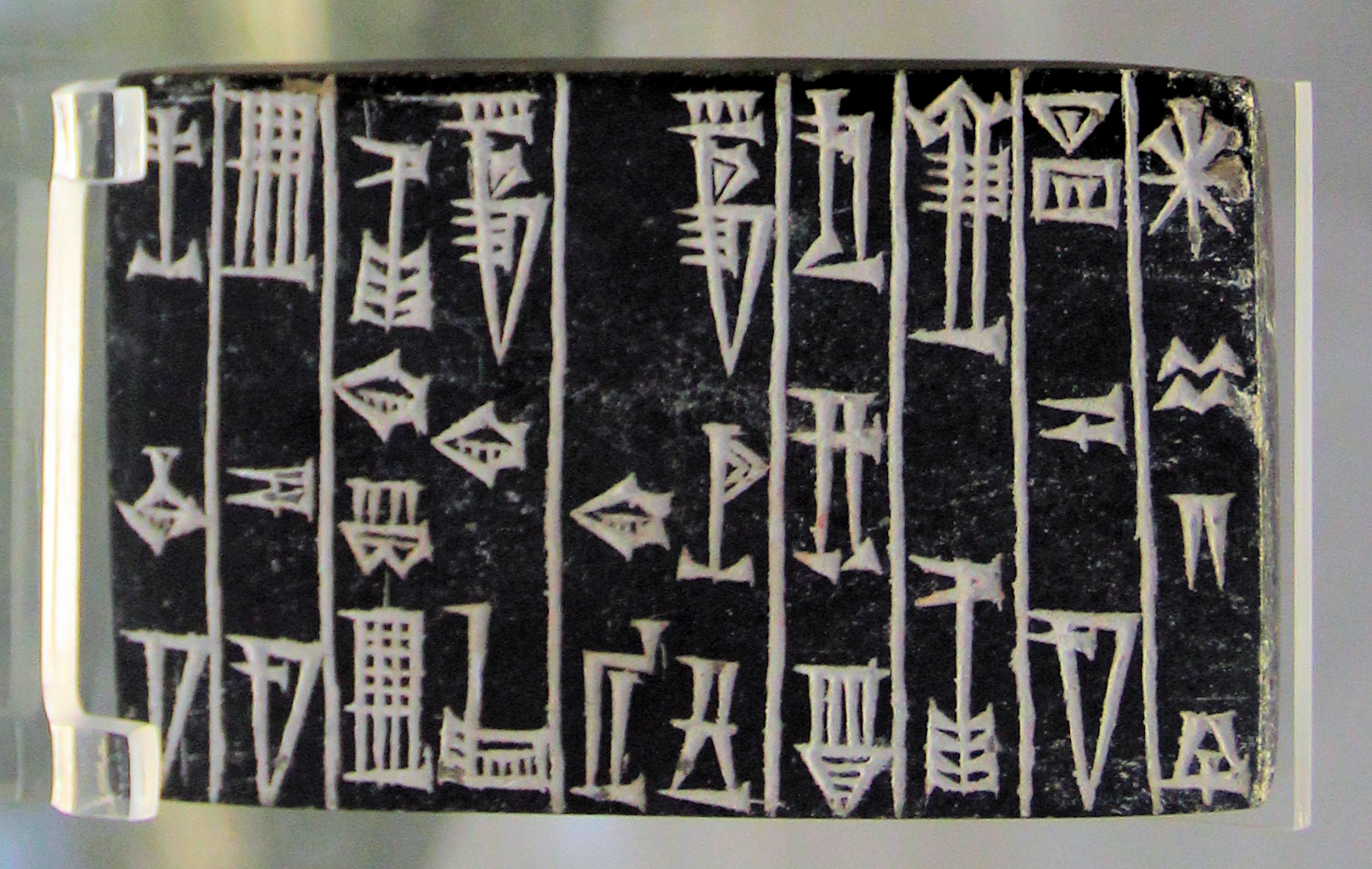
^{d}nimin-tab-ba.............. "For Nimintabba"
nin-a-ni..................... "his Lady,"
šul-gi.................... "Shulgi"
nitah kalag-ga...... "the mighty man"
lugal........................"King"
urim^{ki}-ma............... "of Ur"
lugal ki-en-............... "King of Sumer"
gi ki-uri-ke_{4}................. "and Akkad,"
e_{2}-a-ni.......................... "her Temple"
mu-na-du_{3}................... "he built"

Foundation tablet of king Shulgi (c. 2094–2047 BC), for the Temple of Nimintabba in Ur. ME 118560 British Museum.

=== Year Names ===
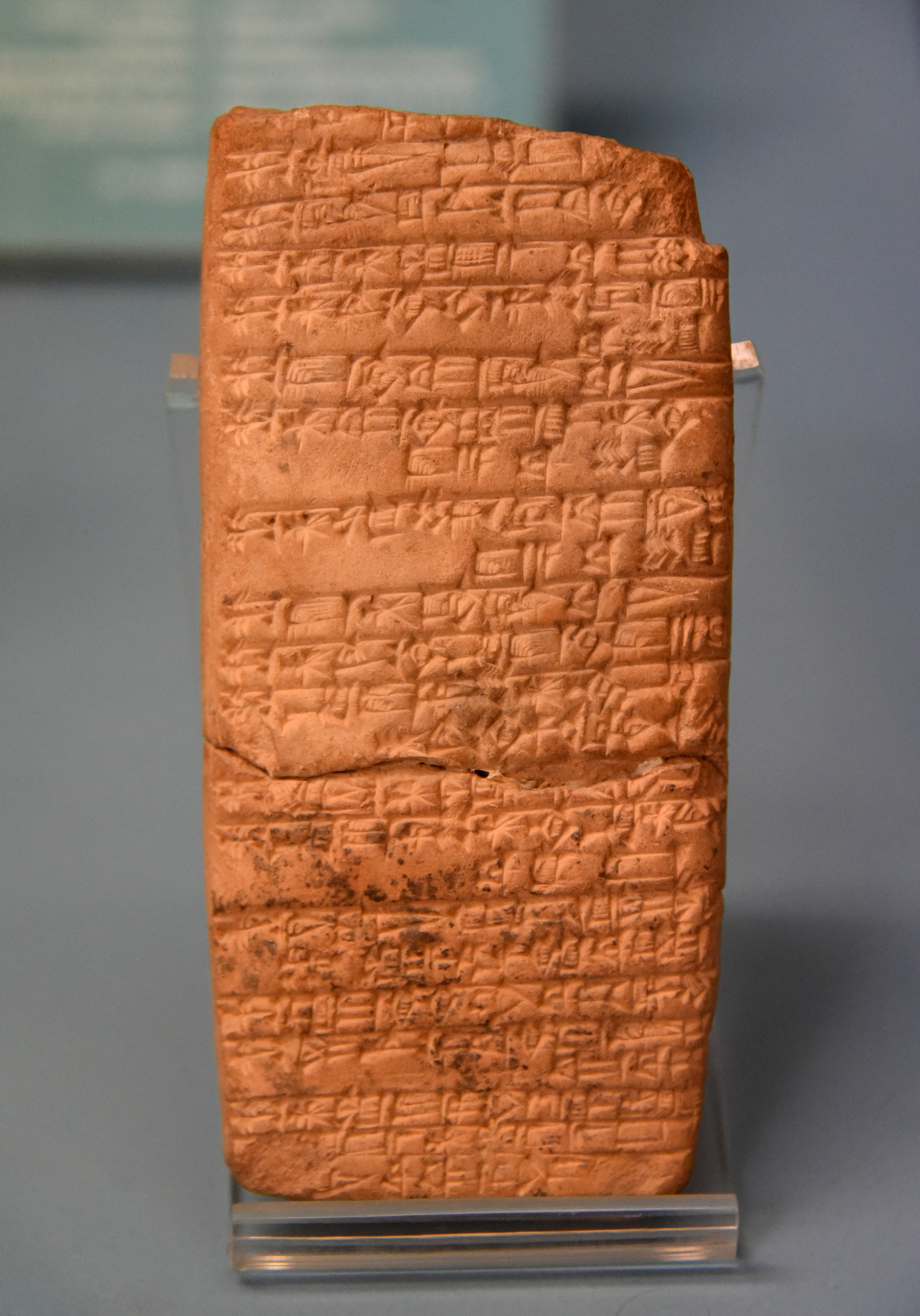
One of the terracotta tablets listing the Year names of Shulgi, from year 6 (𒈬𒄊𒂗𒆤𒆠[𒋫...]: "The year the road from Nippur [was straightened]") to year 21a in this view, the other year names being inscribed on the back. A fragment is missing in this tablet (at the top), corresponding to the first five-year names and the last seven-year names of Shulgi. This is an Old Babylonian copy (ca. 1900–1600 BC) of an Akkadian original. Museum of the Ancient Orient, Istanbul.

One important type of commemorative text consists of the king’s year names: in accordance with the practices of his time, each year was given a name recalling a major event that had taken place during the previous year, such as the restoration of a sanctuary, the offering of a prestigious object to a deity, the construction of a defensive structure or a city, a military victory, or a political or administrative reform. They were used to date administrative documents (often in an abbreviated form), which makes them very useful for chronology. Shulgi is the first ruler for whom the complete set of regnal year names is available. They have been rearranged in chronological order with the help of two lists dating from the Old Babylonian period (18th century BC).

=== Hymns ===
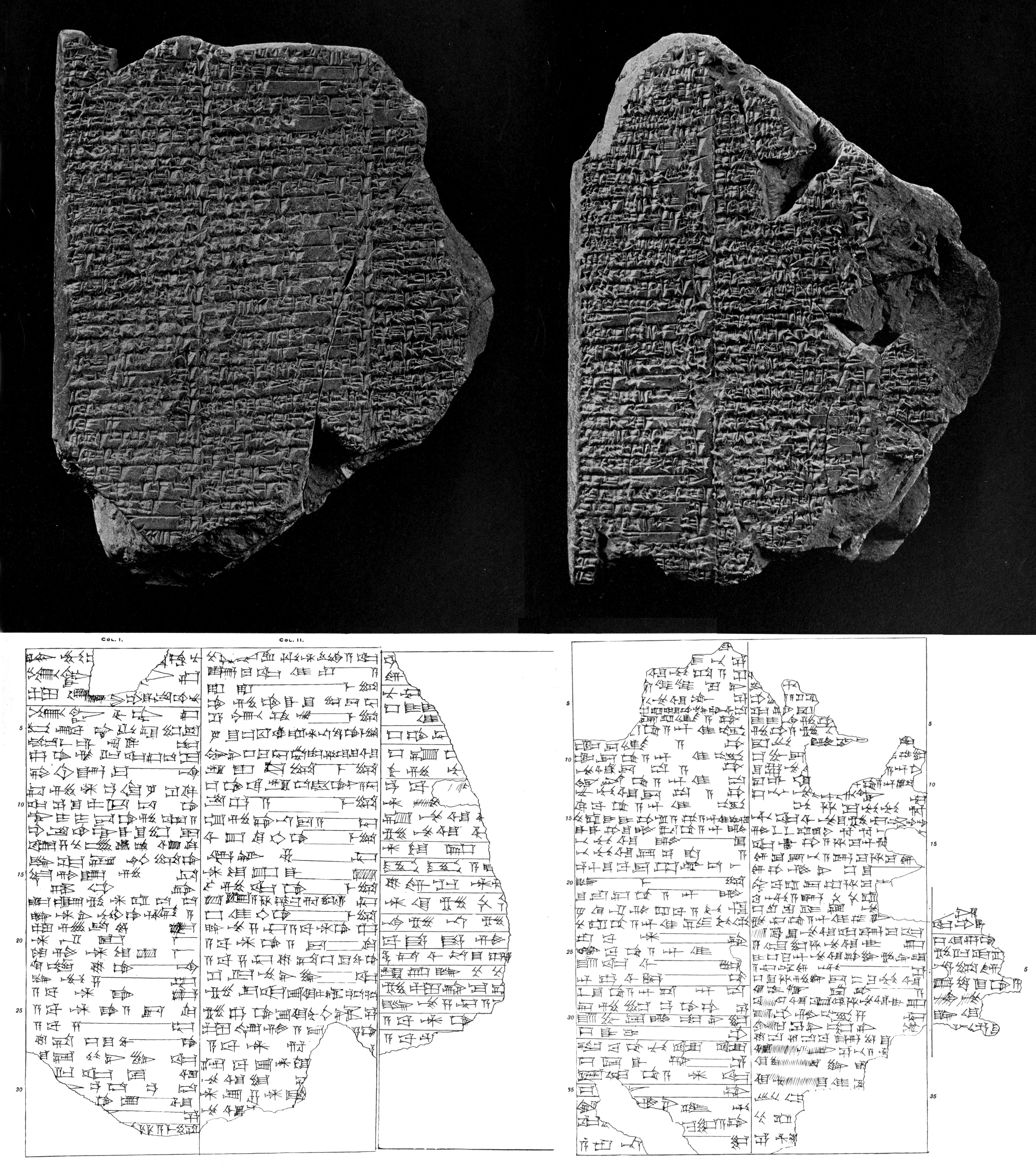
Self-praise of Shulgi (Shulgi D): photograph and handcopy of a tablet.

Other important texts commemorating Shulgi’s deeds and person are a collection of hymns celebrating him. These are either prayers addressed to a deity asking for divine favor for the king, or royal hymns in the strict sense celebrating the king’s qualities, sometimes written in the first person, in the second, or in the third person.

Like other Mesopotamian literary texts, they were identified in ancient times by their opening words (incipit). Historians refer to them either by letters (Shulgi A, Shulgi B, etc.) or by a modern title (notably those given by J. Klein): for example, the hymn Shulgi D, whose ancient “title” was “O my king, great bull with splendid limbs” (Sumerian lugal-gu_{10} gud [gal] á gú-nu), was named Shulgi, the Avenger of Sumer by Klein and Self-praise of Shulgi on the ETCSL website.

These hymns are known from copies dating from after Shulgi’s reign, but several are mentioned in catalogs from the time of the Third Dynasty of Ur, indicating that at least some of them were indeed composed during his reign. It remains possible that others are fabrications, and also that the texts were more or less revised between their creation and the copy through which they are known. It is generally believed that they do originate from Shulgi’s time and reflect the royal ideology of his era, but they are not used as a source for event-based history unless corroborated by another source (such as a year name).

=== Administrative Texts ===
The administrative tablets produced during Shulgi’s reign are indispensable sources for understanding how his kingdom functioned. They are few in number for the early years of his reign, but their number increases starting in his third decade of rule, as a result of the administrative reforms undertaken by the king. For his final years on the throne, several thousand tablets are known. These sources come from a limited number of sites (primarily Girsu, Umma, and Puzrish-Dagan). Most of them were dug during illicit excavations in the early 20th century and were sold on the antiquities market in scattered lots to museums, universities, or private Western collectors.

=== Apocryphal Letters ===
Another type of textual source known from later tablets is the so-called "Correspondence of the Kings of Ur," some of which are letters supposedly addressed to Shulgi or written by him. They apparently refer to people and events from his reign, but it is generally believed that these are apocryphal texts composed after his reign. These sources are therefore rarely used to reconstruct the history of his reign.

=== Arts and Architecture ===
The cylinder seals and impressions of cylinder seals belonging to members of the administration found on clay tablets and bullae from that period are another important source, combining textual and visual information: they often bear inscriptions identifying their bearer, their office, and the king they served, as well as images that carry religious and political significance.

Few buildings have been excavated in the condition they were in during Shulgi’s reign. The first phase of the Ehursag of Ur, a palatial complex, is attributed to him. His tomb may be located within this complex.

The known visual depictions of the king are found primarily on cylinder seals. Apart from these, few royal images from the Ur III period are known: copper foundation figurines buried beneath buildings along with commemorative inscriptions, and two fragmentary stone statuettes whose inscriptions indicate that they depicted Shulgi. The attribution of other artworks to this reign is debated. It has been proposed that the rock relief depicting a warrior-king at Darband-i Gawr in southern Kurdistan—a region where Shulgi waged campaigns—be dated to his reign. A stone head, the only surviving fragment of an ancient statue, is sometimes viewed as a depiction of Shulgi; but in the absence of an inscription, this cannot be proven (unless it is a modern forgery).

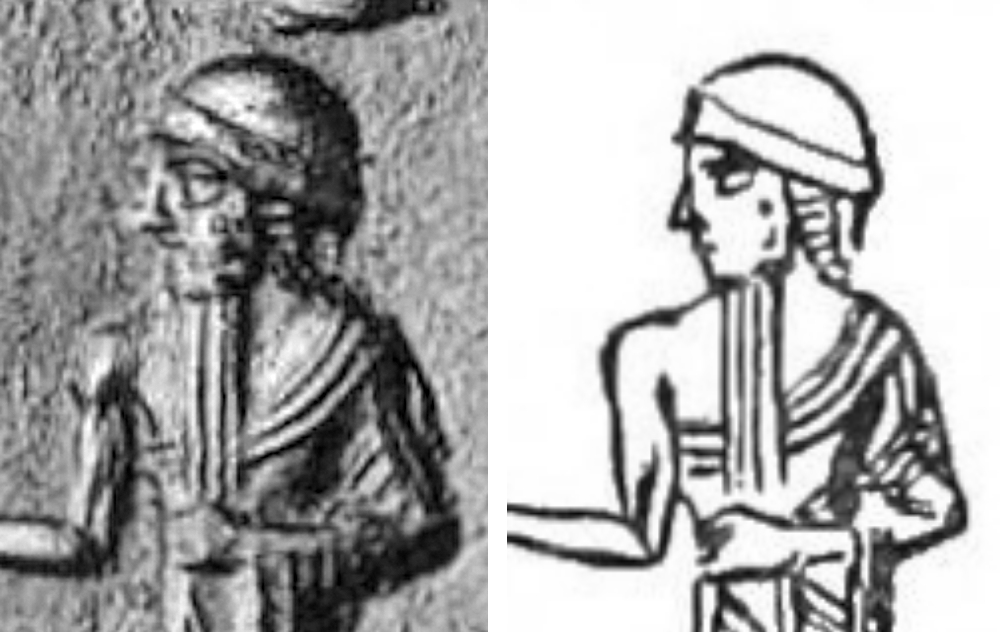
Portrait of Shulgi from Ur-Nabnigal seal. Louvre Museum.

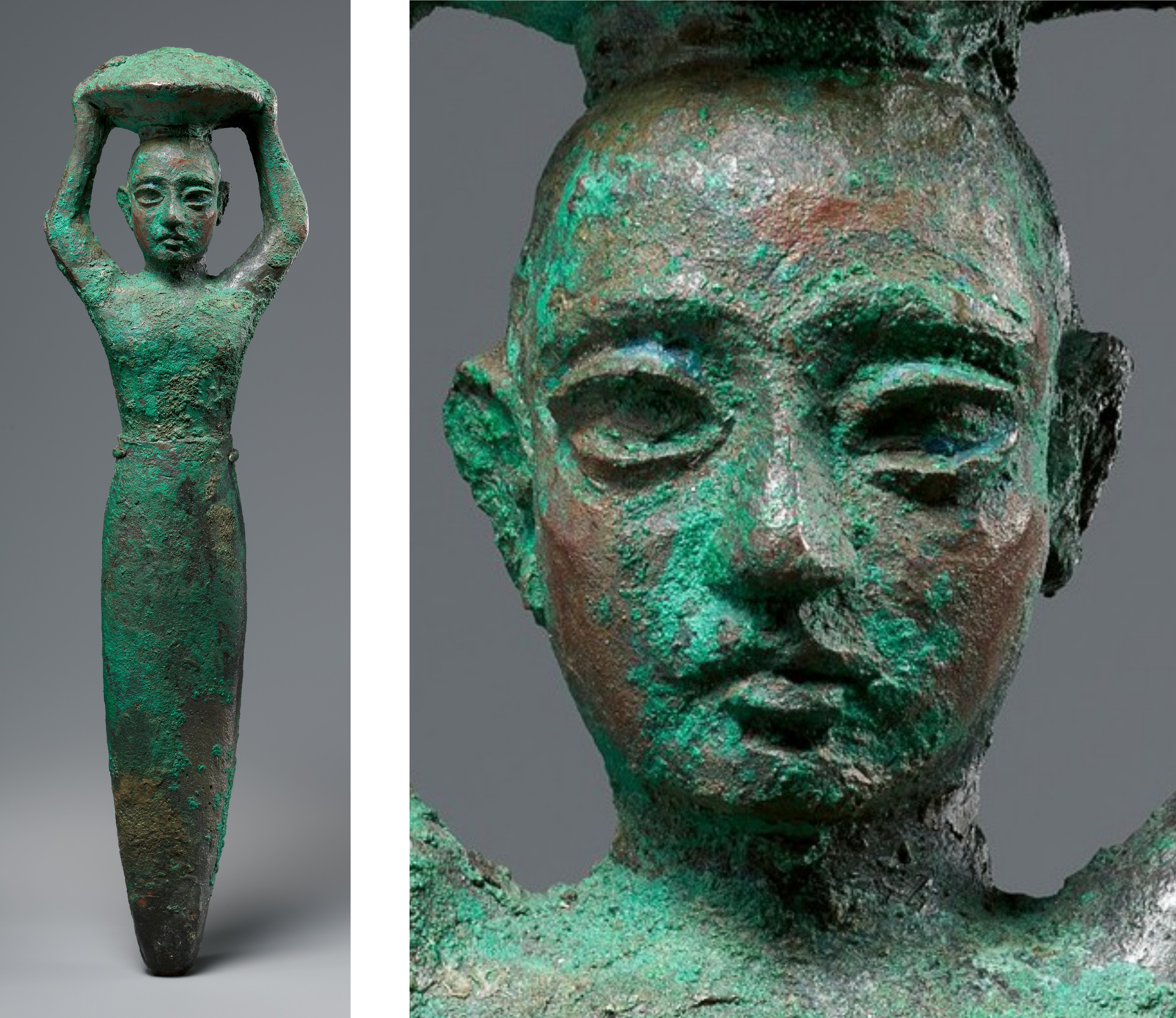
Portrait of Shulgi as a builder, on a foundation nail. Metropolitan Museum of Art.

== Life and Reign ==
The approximate extent of the empire of the Third Dynasty of Ur during Shulgi’s reign, and its center-periphery organization.

=== Chronology ===
According to the general consensus, Shulgi reigned for 48 years. This is based on the fact that the sequence of 48 of his year names has been reconstructed from administrative documents, but neither of the two known lists of his year names is complete. The various versions of the Sumerian King List agree that his reign lasted close to or exceeded half a century: 46, 48, or 58.

The year names make it possible to reconstruct the framework of the relative chronology of his reign, and thus to determine when to place the major events appearing in the sources of the time. However, dating them within the current system is complicated by various dating issues that reflect ongoing debates (see Chronology of the ancient Near East). Consequently, various proposals exist: the most common, in the so-called “middle” chronology, places his reign from 2094 to 2048/7 BC or 2092–2045 BC.

In any case, historians generally prefer to date the events of his reign based on the sequence of his regnal years as they have reconstructed it, for example, “the 3rd year of Shulgi’s reign” ou "(regnal) year 3" (often abbreviated as “Š3”).

=== Accession to the Throne ===
The circumstances surrounding Shulgi’s accession to the throne can only be inferred from literary sources, whose historical reliability cannot be clearly established.

He was the son of King Ur-Namma of Ur, who reigned for 18 years (ca. 2110–2092 BC in the middle chronology) and founded the New Kingdom of Ur. His mother was Ur-Namma’s wife, whose name is not definitively translated: SI.A-tum, generally understood to be Watartum.

The hymn known as The Death of Ur-Namma narrates, as its name suggests, the death of Shulgi’s father. A passage in the text describes how the king was brought back to the palace wounded and dying, which has been interpreted as an indication that he had been killed in battle. It has been suggested that the hymn Shulgi D, also titled Shulgi, the Avenger of Sumer, refers to a military campaign that Shulgi may have led early in his reign to avenge his father’s death. His enemy in the text, the Gutians, would then be responsible for the defeat that cost Ur-Namma his life..

In any case, Shulgi succeeded his father to the throne. Ur-Namma’s reign—about which little is known—was devoted to the conquest of Lower Mesopotamia and also of Susiana, and to the consolidation of his conquests through several measures: establishing a provincial administration, restoring the kingdom’s major sanctuaries, building and repairing roads and canals, standardizing weights and measures, and compiling a legal code (Code of Ur-Namma). On the diplomatic front, he forged an alliance with the kingdom of Mari in Syria, cemented by the marriage of one of his sons (probably Shulgi) to the daughter of the local king Apil-kin, who took the name Taram-Uram. His death brought his undertakings to a sudden halt, and it fell to Shulgi to carry them on..

The year in which Shulgi ascended the throne is simply titled “Year (in which) Shulgi (became) king.” It is not known how old he was at that time; he may have been quite young. The hymn Shulgi G, which recounts how Enlil chose Shulgi to entrust him with royal power, may have been a hymn for a coronation ceremony during which he received the regalia of kingship, kept in the great temple of the god, the Ekur, located in Nippur. Other sources from the Ur III period indicate that the kings of this dynasty were crowned in three cities in all: Nippur, Ur, and Uruk.

=== Major Phases ===
The general development of the kingdom of Ur under Shulgi can be reconstructed by using his 48 year names as a framework and combining them with his royal inscriptions and data from administrative tablets. These sources allow to distinguish several major phases.

The first two decades of Shulgi’s reign are very poorly documented. This was a period of continuing his father Ur-Namma’s projects and preserving the kingdom’s borders. He continued construction work at the country’s major sanctuaries as well as the dedication of ritual objects, carried on with the development of the transportation network (years 6 and 7), and built a palace (year 10). The main military campaign undertaken abroad took place in the Der region, located on the route between Lower Mesopotamia and Elam; several year names mention its restoration and subsequent destruction, indicating that this campaign was not an easy one. The 18th year commemorates the marriage between one of the king’s daughters and the king of the land of Marhashi, located in Iran (in Kerman?).

Around the twentieth year of his reign, a period of more ambitious and coordinated reforms began, lasting about ten years. It was at this time that signs of the king’s deification began to appear and he resumed the Akkadian title of “king of the four corners,” which indicated an ambition of world domination. He reorganized the royal army (year 20) and the administration of the provinces and temples estates (years 21–22). This series of reforms resulted in a pyramidal political organization, a 'patrimonial' system of domination, in which the royal authority and its inner circle controlled most, if not all, of the resources.

Another major change that occurred after the twentieth year of his reign was that the kingdom’s armies went on campaigns almost every year, a situation that continued for the remainder of his reign and under Shulgi’s successors. These campaigns were directed eastward: first the capture of Der, then various campaigns in the years 24–32 against Karakin and Simurrum (Iraqi Kurdistan), Harshi (present-day Iranian Ilam province). An attempt was made to form a diplomatic alliance with the Elamite city-state of Anshan, which eventually ended in failure, as it was a target of Ur's troops in the years 34–35.

The years 37 through 41 indicate major developments at the heart of the kingdom, reflecting a new phase in its reorganization and perhaps a pause in military campaigns. A large defensive wall was erected in the north, and an administrative center was built over several years in the city of Puzrish-Dagan (year names 39, 40, and 41).

The following year names (44–48) commemorate military campaigns toward the north, into the lands of Lullubum, Urbilum, Sahrum, and Arrapḫum; again against Simurrum and Karakin; then in the Zagros Mountains at Kimash and Hurti; and once more at Harshi. Amorite tribes may also have been an opponent during the last years of Shulgi's reign.

=== Death ===
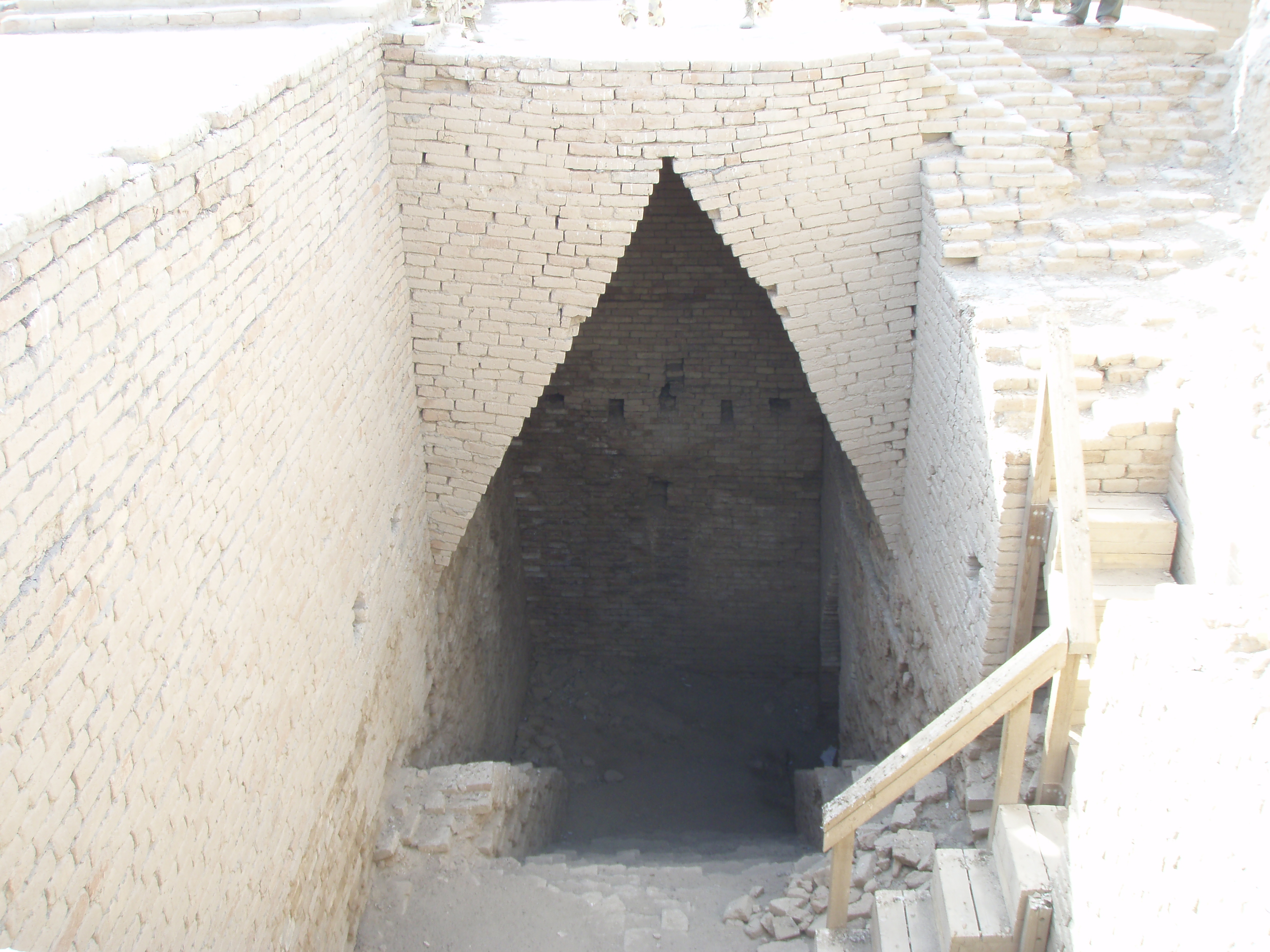
Entrance to the underground chambers of one of the “mausoleums” built beneath the Ehursag in Ur.

Shulgi died in his 48th regnal year, likely at a fairly advanced age (around 65–70 years). An administrative tablet indicates that sacrifices were made for his funerary cult as early as the second day of the tenth month of that year, which suggests that he died shortly before.

The location where Shulgi was buried has not been definitively identified. The best candidate is an underground structure consisting of several vaulted chambers with burial niches located near the palace he had built in Ur, the Ehursag. Inscriptions found at the site bear the names of Shulgi and his son Amar-Sin, who have therefore been identified as the deceased buried there, perhaps alongside their wives. However, in the absence of conclusive evidence, other burial sites are possible (in Uruk, in Nippur).

The circumstances of Shulgi’s death are unknown and a subject of debate among historians. He may simply have died of old age, given his advanced age. But it is possible that the story is more tragic, such as a palace coup resulting in the assassination of the king and several members of the royal family. The son who succeeded him, Amar-Sin, is not mentioned in the records of his reign (for an unknown reason: exile, a name change upon ascending the throne?) and may not have been the designated heir. The most puzzling fact is that two of his wives, Shulgi-simti and Geme-Ninlila, died shortly thereafter, which can be explained in various ways (natural causes, accidental deaths, or sacrifices to accompany the king in death). Furthermore, several of the princes and princesses appearing in the archives of Shulgi's reign are no longer mentioned afterward.

== Royal Ideology and Glorification ==
=== Titles ===
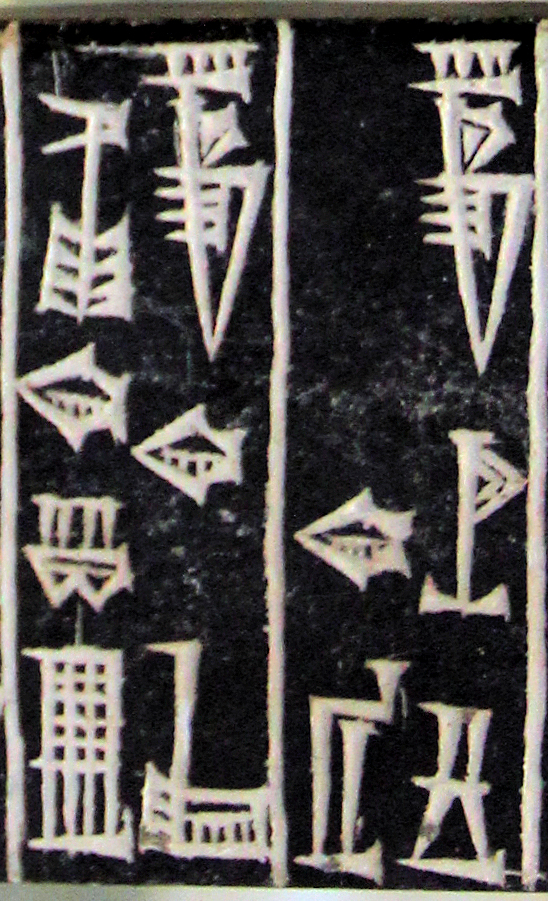
Detail of an inscription by Shulgi: in the right panel, the title “King of Ur”; in the left panel, the title “King of Sumer and Akkad." Louvre Museum.

Shulgi’s titles (mostly in Sumerian) provide important information about his conception of power and its evolution:

- “King of Ur” (lugal uri-ma), the seat of his dynasty;
- “King of (the lands of) Sumer and Akkad” (lugal ki-engi ki-uri-ke), a title that first appeared during the reign of his father Ur-Namma, which emphasizes the unity of the two cultural regions of Lower Mesopotamia; Shulgi adopted this title at the beginning of his reign but later discarded it;
- “mighty man/male” (nita kalag-ga), sometimes “mighty king,” taken from the title of Naram-Sin of Akkad (Akkadian dannum), emphasizing the monarch’s 'heroic' qualities;
- “divine Shulgi” or “the god Shulgi” (^{d}Šulgi), beginning in his 20th year of reign or shortly thereafter, when his name is written with the determinative (prefix) for divine names (DINGIR), indicating his claim to divine status;
- “protector deity of the Land” (^{d}lama kalam-ma) or “god of his Land” (dingir kalam-ma-na), another indication of his deification;
- “King of the four corners (of the world)” (lugal AN-ub-da limmu-ba), at least from regnal year 26 onward, another title borrowed from Naram-Sin, which reflects a claim to universal ('imperial') dominion.

=== Royal Literature ===
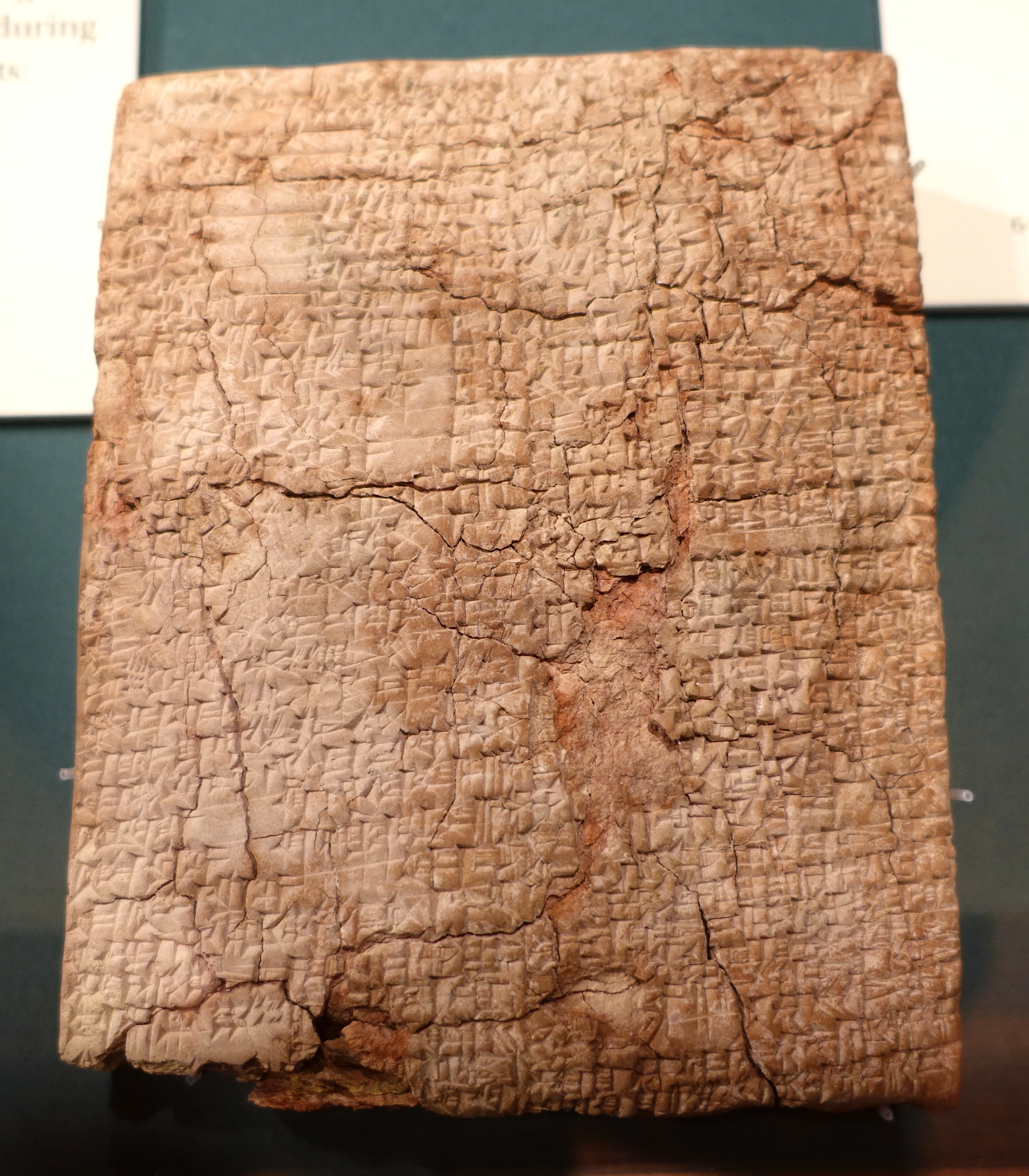
Tablet of the Shulgi A hymn (or Shulgi, the King of the Road), a copy from the 18th century BC. Museum of the Institute for the Study of Ancient Cultures, Chicago.

Shulgi established a system of 'royal propaganda,' aimed at legitimizing the ruler, at least in the eyes of the elite.

This strategy was clearly inspired by that of the kings of Akkad (Naram-Sin, in particular), but also by Gudea of Lagash (the so-called “Sumerian Renaissance”), drew on commemorative inscriptions, sculpted monuments (whose texts are known only from Old Babylonian copies), and, above all, on dedicated hymns composed to highlight the king’s qualities and consolidate his legitimacy, as well as to preserve his memory, as stated in the hymn Shulgi E (or Testament of Shulgi):

May my hymns be in everyone's mouth; let the songs about me not pass from memory. So that the fame of my praise, the words which Enki composed about me, and which Ĝeštin-ana joyously speaks from the heart and broadcasts far and wide, shall never be forgotten, I have had them written down line by line in the House of the Wisdom of Nisaba in holy heavenly writing, as great works of scholarship. No one shall ever let any of it pass from memory..

These hymns are part of 'royal' or 'palace literature,' which notably includes an epic cycle featuring the legendary rulers of Uruk (Enmerkar, Lugalbanda, Gilgamesh), with whom Shulgi claims kinship. The oldest known version of the Sumerian King List, extending up to his reign, includes a celebration of Shulgi. Hymns to Ur-Namma were allegedly commissioned to restore the honor of his lineage after his father’s death in battle.

Shulgi established 'academies' (“House of Wisdom” é-geštu_{2}, “House of Tablets” é-dubba) to train scholars capable of composing and copying these hymns. These hymns were sung with musical accompaniment during religious ceremonies, involving court singers and musicians. This is mentioned in particular in the hymns Shulgi B and E.

=== The King and the Gods ===
King Shulgi carnelian bead
(c. 2094–2047 BCE)

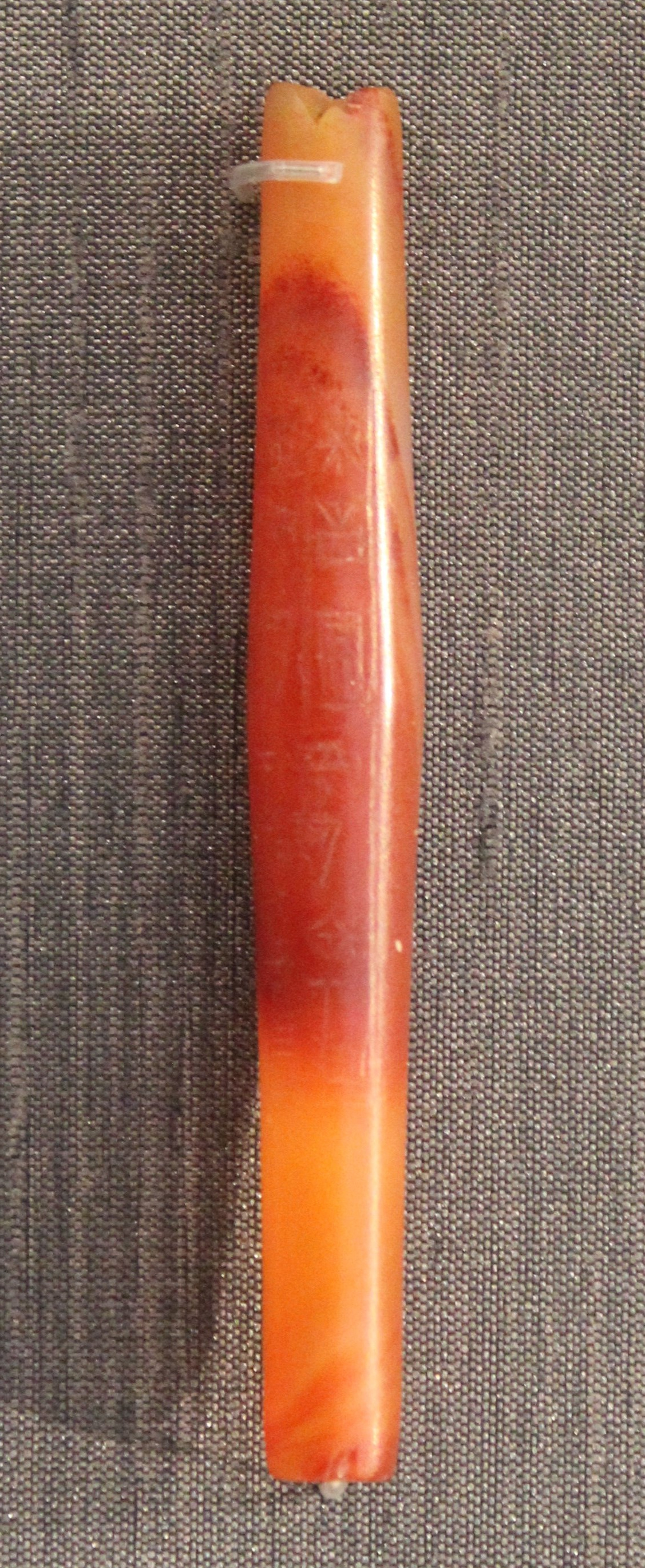
𒀭𒊩𒌆𒆤
𒎏𒀀𒉌
𒀭𒂄𒄀
𒍑𒆗𒂵
𒈗𒋀𒀊𒆠𒈠
𒈗𒆠𒂗
𒄀𒆠𒌵𒆤
𒉆𒋾𒆷𒉌𒂠
𒀀𒈬𒈾𒊒

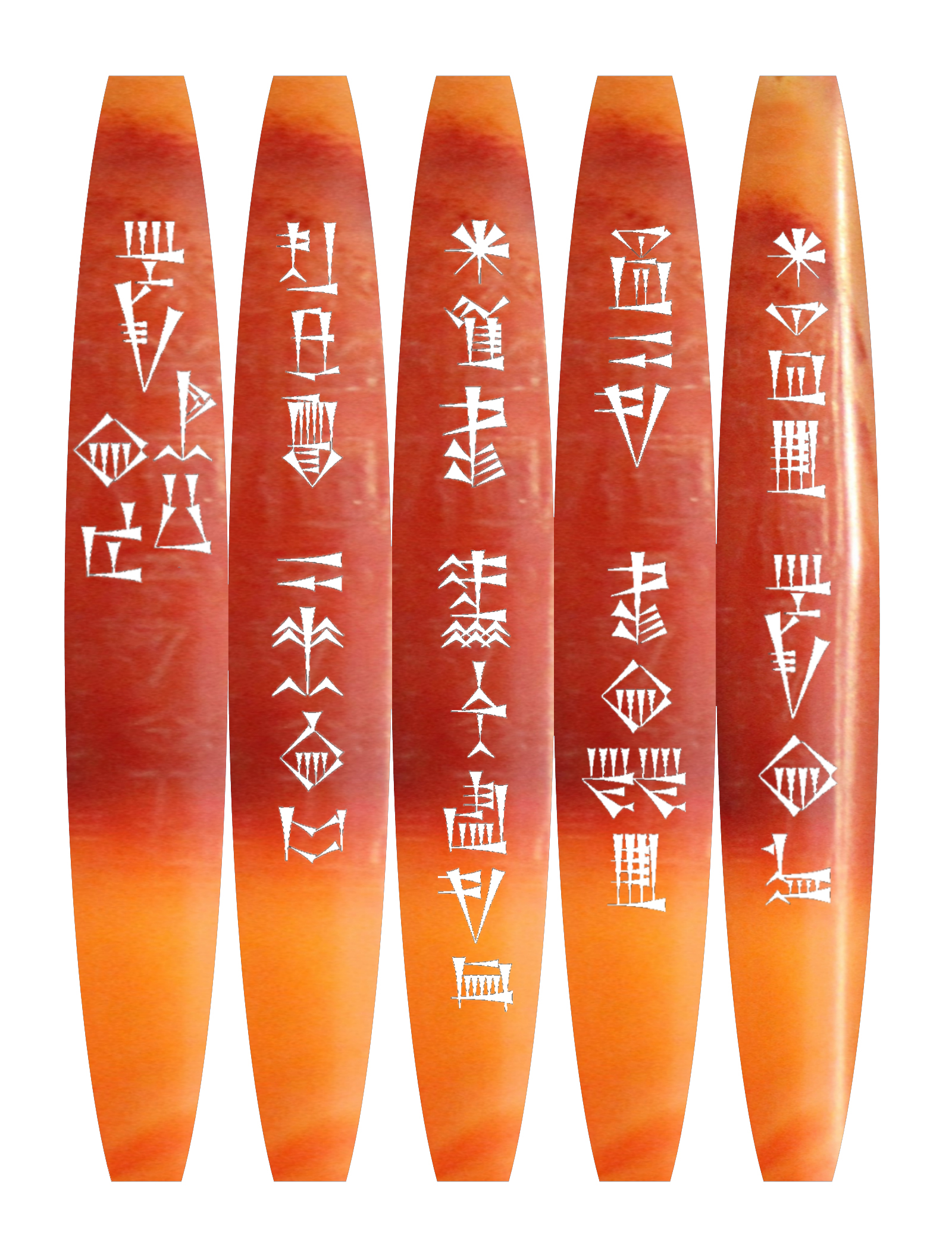
^{d}nin-lil_{2}.......................... "For Ninlil"
nin-a-ni....................... "his Lady,"
^{d}šul-gi.................... "Shulgi"
nitah kalag-ga........ "the mighty man"
lugal urim^{ki}-ma..... "King of Ur"
lugal ki-en-................. "King of Sumer"
gi ki-uri-ke_{4}..................... "and Akkad,"
nam-ti-la-ni-še_{3}........... "for his life"
a mu-na-ru................... "dedicated (this)"

Carnelian bead, elongated (7 cm), Harappan style, provenance unknown. Bearing a cuneiform commemorative inscription of Shulgi, dedicating the bead to the goddess Ninlil. British Museum, BM 129493 This carnelian bead was probably imported from the Indus valley.

The hymns indicate that Shulgi reigns because he was chosen by the gods An, Enlil, and Nanna, who endowed him with the qualities necessary to fulfill this role, as well as the regalia symbolizing kingship. The hymn Shulgi G, which, according to J. Klein, is a coronation hymn for Shulgi composed for a ceremony held at the sanctuary of Enlil in Nippur, places the king’s birth under divine auspices.

Enthroned by the gods, the ruler is entrusted with a heavy responsibility. He must ensure the smooth running of their cult and thus follow the model of the pious king: following in his father’s footsteps, he builds or restores their sanctuaries—including those of secondary importance—makes offerings to them, participates in their major festivals, and dedicates some of his daughters to the gods. In return, this attracts their blessings not only upon himself but upon his entire kingdom. This is commemorated in particular by regnal years and numerous foundation inscriptions.. These inscriptions often take the form of stone tablets or copper foundation pegs depicting the king carrying a basket of bricks (“canephore”), buried under the restored buildings.

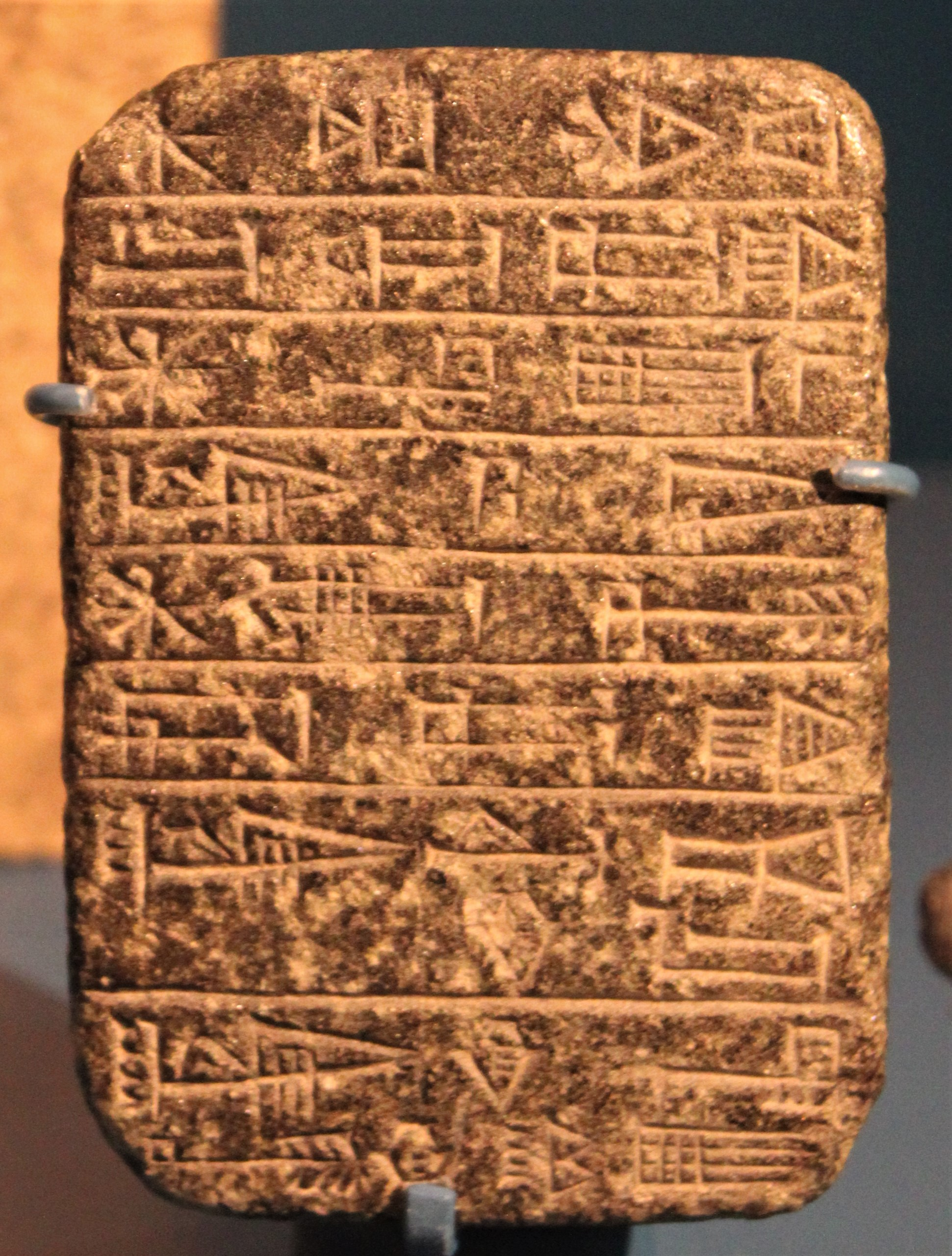
Tablet commemorating the reconstruction of the temple of Ningirsu in Lagash. Ashmolean Museum.
Translation of the inscription: "For the god Ningirsu, mighty hero of the god Enlil, his lord, Shulgi, mighty man, King of Ur, King of the lands of Sumer and Akkad, built his temple of Bagara for him."

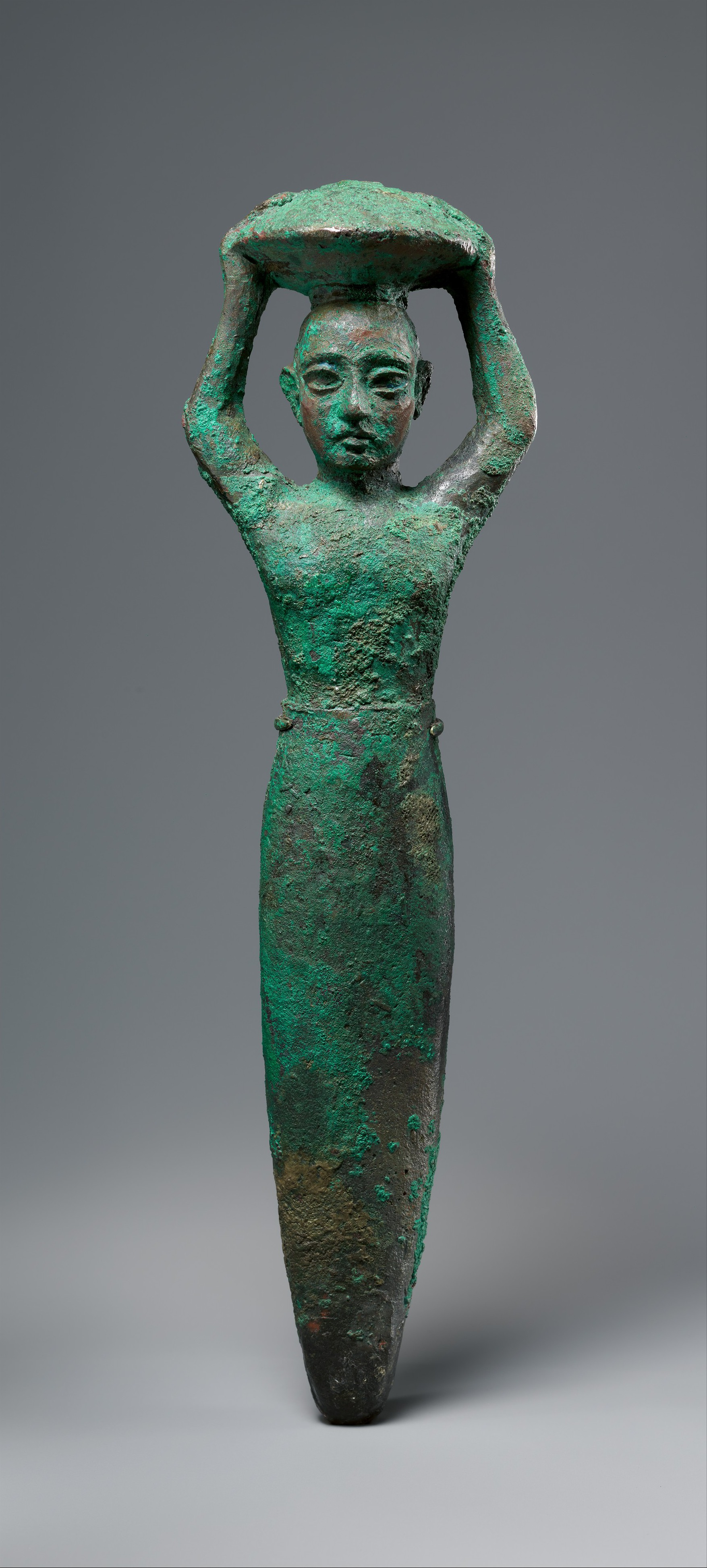
Foundation nail commemorating the reconstruction of the temple of Inanna at Nippur. Metropolitan Museum.
Translation of the inscription: "For the goddess Inanna, his lady, Shulgi, mighty man, king of Ur, king of the lands of Sumer and Akkad, built her E-duranki for her."

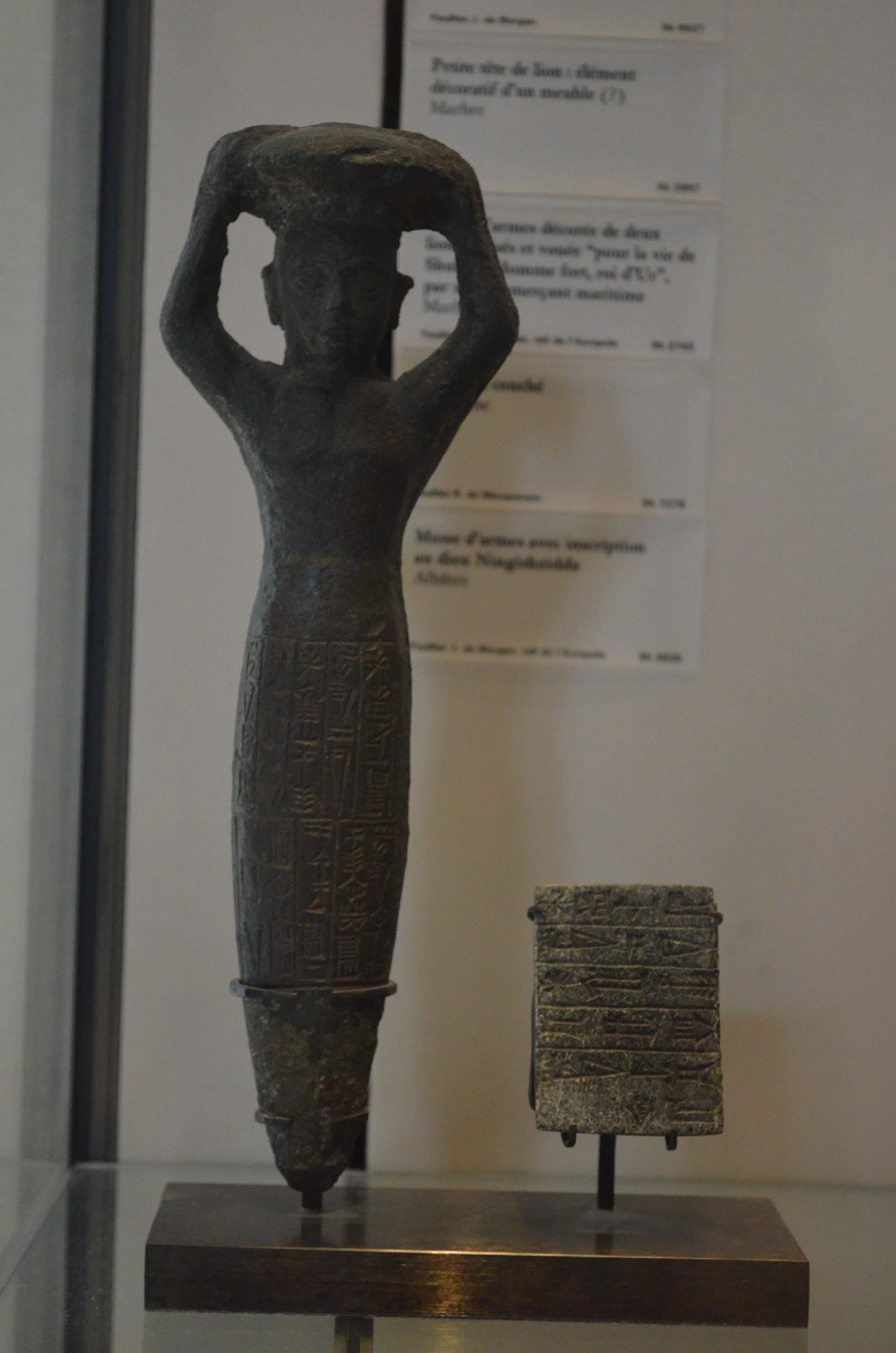
Foundation peg and tablet commemorating the reconstruction of the temple of Inshushinak in Susa. Louvre Museum.
Translation of the inscription: "For the god Inshushinak, his lord, Shulgi, mighty man, king of Ur, king of the lands of Sumer and Akkad, built for him A'arkesh, his beloved temple."

The hymns also commemorate offerings. Shulgi V thus narrates the creation of a statue depicting Shulgi, on the occasion of his journey between Ur and Nippur, intended to be placed in the temple of Enlil, facing the statue of the god. Shulgi R (or Shulgi and Ninlil's Boat) recounts the construction of the sacred boat of the goddess Ninlil, an event also recorded in the name of the 8th year of his reign, thus providing a cultic context for the composition of this hymn. This barge is intended for use during the procession of the goddess’s divine statue, from Nippur to Tummal, which takes place during her great festival.

Oh barge, Enki assigned the quay of abundance to you as your fate. Father Enlil looked at you with approval. Your lady, Ninlil, commanded your construction. She entrusted it to the faithful provider, King Šulgi; and the shepherd, who is of broad intelligence, will not rest day and night in thinking deeply about you. He, the wise one, who is proficient in planning, he, the omniscient one, will fell large cedars in the huge forests for you. He will make you perfect and you will be breathtaking to look upon..

=== Deification ===
Legitimation by divine election was supplemented during Shulgi’s reign by the deification of the king. He was the second Mesopotamian ruler to attain this status during their lifetime, after Naram-Sin of Akkad. Whether or not he was inspired by this precedent, Shulgi’s motivations can undoubtedly also be found in the context of his accession to the throne and his early years of reign: his father’s death in battle and the need to consolidate his kingdom and his own legitimacy may explain why he took this step, no later than his 21st year on the throne. More broadly, this was part of the measures he took to reinvent and consolidate the state.

This deification is reflected in several elements. It is first evident in the fact that the king’s name is written preceded by the sign (𒀭) used to identify a divine being in the texts, which takes the form of a star and here conveys the meaning of “god” (Sumerian dingir). This is the main indicator of when he became a god. Specifically, Shulgi appears to have been regarded as a protective deity of his kingdom (“Protector God of the/his Land,” ^{d}lama kalam-ma(-na) or “God of the Land,” dingir kalam-ma) rather than as the god of a specific city. This was accompanied by the establishment of temples and cults in his honor, with festivals that gave names to months in the cultic calendars of the kingdom’s cities, as well as the crafting of his divine statues. The king's name also began to appear in personal names as a 'theophoric' element, that is, a deity under whose protection one places oneself. In this case, it was a way of affirming one's loyalty to the monarch (it often seems to be a new name, and not a birth name), since this practice was particularly prevalent among his servants and close circle (e.g. his wife Shulgi-simti 'Shulgi (is) my pride/ornament').

The deification of Shulgi is an elaborate theological construct, through which he is integrated into the divine and heroic society. The hymns indicate that he was 'adopted' into the divine family of Uruk (which may have been the place of origin of his dynasty): he became the son of the goddess Ninsun and King Lugalbanda, thereby making him the brother of Gilgamesh—a fact specifically affirmed in the hymn Shulgi O. He is also elevated to the status of spouse of the goddess Inanna (hymns Shulgi X and Shulgi Z; linked to a 'sacred marriage' ritual?), equated with her divine husband, the god Dumuzi. Through this, he also becomes the son-in-law of the god Nanna (Inanna’s father), the brother-in-law of the god Utu (Inanna’s brother), and the brother of the goddess Geshtinanna (Dumuzi’s sister).

=== The Ideal King ===
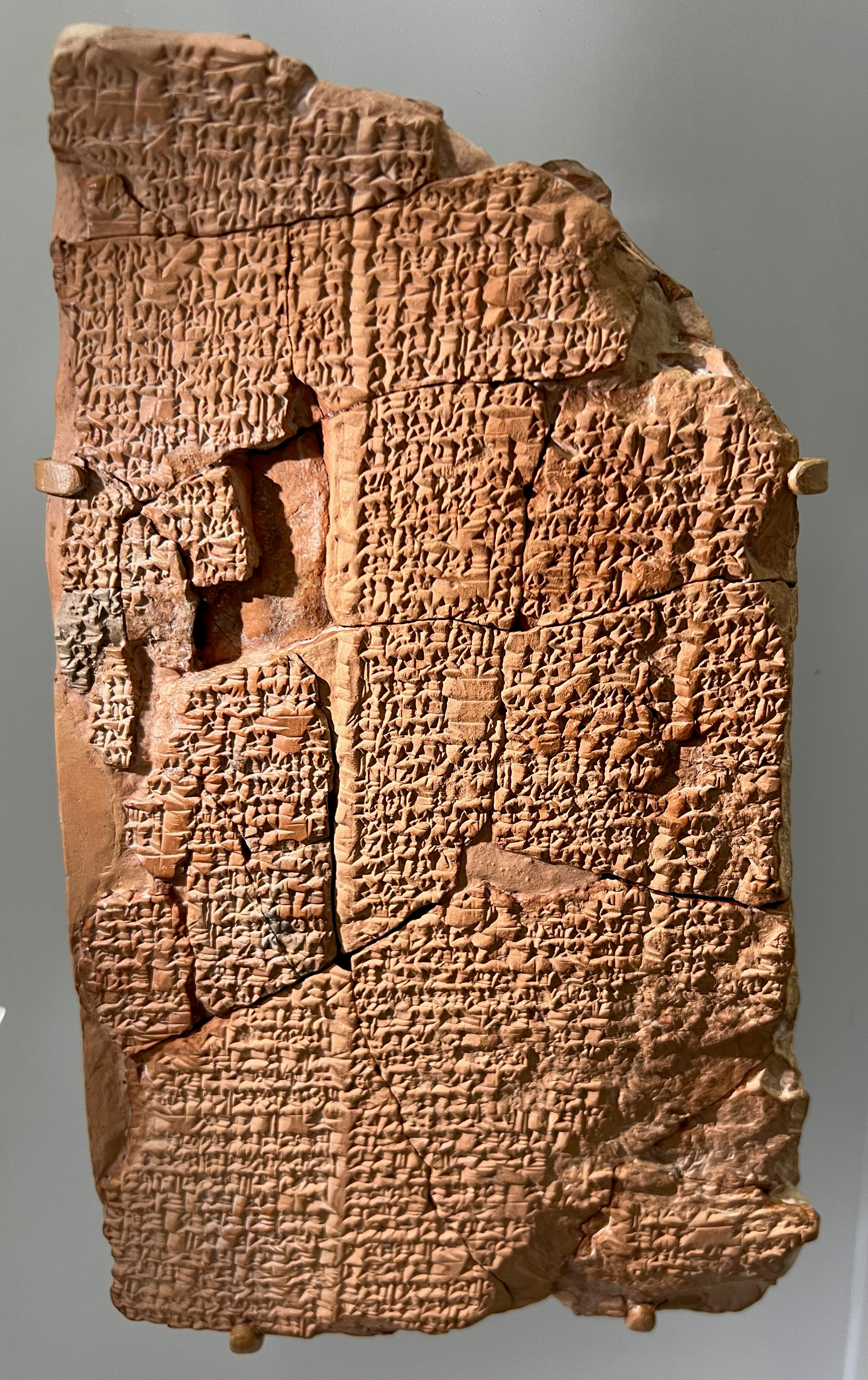
Shulgi B, or Shulgi, the Ideal King, copy from the 18th century BC found in Nippur. Penn Museum.

The royal hymns dedicated to Shulgi paint a picture of a king who personally embodies the kingdom (and even the actions of his subjects). He does everything himself, because he can do everything.

Shulgi’s legitimizing discourse does not emphasize much his military achievements, unlike the kings of Akkad, but does not ignore them either. The motif of the victorious king is most evident in the hymn Shulgi D, or Shulgi, the Avenger of Sumer, whose tone rivals that of the epics of the kings of Uruk; it is about his triumphant campaign against the land of Gutium, inflicting heavy losses upon it and leaving it in desolation..

He presents himself as a king with a perfect and vigorous physique, capable of unparalleled athletic feats. Shulgi A, or Shulgi, the King of the Road, recounts how he improved the roads of his kingdom and traveled round-trip from Nippur to Ur (around 160 kilometers as the crow flies) in a single day, even as a storm raged across the land, in order to celebrate a religious festival in both cities on the same day. This feat is also commemorated by the name of his 7th regnal year. An administrative text records the fashion of a statue of the king as a runner with a chariot, indicating that this type of race appears to have been conducted with a horse-drawn chariot.

I, the king, however, did not fear, nor was I terrified. I rushed forth like a fierce lion. I galloped like an ass in the desert. With my heart full of joy, I ran (?) onward. Trotting like a solitary wild ass, I traversed a distance of fifteen double-hours by the time Utu was to set his face toward his house; my saĝ-ursaĝ priests looked at me with admiration. I celebrated the eš-eš festival in both Nippur and Ur on the same day!

In Shulgi X, the king visits the temples of Inanna and then Utu to give them spoils of war (probably following the conflict narrated in Shulgi D); in gratitude, the Sun God himself sings his praises:

The hero Utu received him smiling, and decreed a fate for Šulgi the good shepherd of Sumer: "King, eloquent and good-looking, mighty hero, born to be a lion, young wild bull standing firm in its vigour, valiant one, unrestrained in his strength, who tramples great mountains underfoot: you have subdued the heroes of the foreign lands, you have trampled upon all the foreign rulers, you have established your name to the ends of the world.".

Shulgi’s full range of qualities is echoed in other hymns, notably Shulgi B or Shulgi, the Ideal King and Shulgi C or Shulgi, the Glorious King, in which the king boasts in the first person of all the qualities that make him the perfect king: he excels in the art of war, hunting, running, dancing, interpreting omens, playing musical instruments, managing the kingdom’s affairs, mastering foreign languages, administering justice, observing rituals, diplomacy, copying ancient hymns and composing new ones, and establishing academies of scribes to compose hymns. Shulgi B concludes with his entry into his palace in Ur, the Ehursag, which may indicate that it was composed on the occasion of his inauguration (commemorated by the name of his 10th year).

A remarkable aspect of these hymns is the emphasis on the king’s wisdom, which portrays him as omniscient. He has mastered the art of writing because he was educated in his youth in the “Houses of Tablets,” training centers for apprentice scribes. He is one of the few Mesopotamian kings to highlight his ability to read, write, and count. He possessed vast knowledge, which was interpreted as a sign of divine favor. This quality also manifested itself in his understanding of divine omens.

I, Šulgi the noble, have been blessed with a favourable destiny right from the womb. When I was small, I was at the academy, where I learned the scribal art from the tablets of Sumer and Akkad. None of the nobles could write on clay as I could. There where people regularly went for tutelage in the scribal art, I qualified fully in subtraction, addition, reckoning and accounting. The fair Nanibgal, Nisaba, provided me amply with knowledge and comprehension. I am an experienced scribe who does not neglect a thing.

By showcasing his countless qualities in this way, Shulgi seeks to prove his ability to rule for the good of his subjects. This purpose is reflected in the metaphor of the 'good shepherd' guiding and protecting the kingdom’s inhabitants, which emerges in several royal speeches and may be evident in the measures taken to protect the country and control the flow of its resources, particularly livestock. Shulgi F, or Shulgi, King of Abundance, tells how Shulgi swears before the god Nanna to defend his kingdom and restore the cult, after which the god pleads with his father Enlil to bestow his blessing upon the king. The rest of the narrative describes how Shulgi brought peace, prosperity, and abundance to his kingdom.

== Shulgi’s Court ==
King Shulgi reigns at the pinnacle of the kingdom, and all responsibilities within it stem from his person. The logic behind the functioning of the kingdom has been described as 'patrimonial.' The state is, in a sense, the king’s patrimony; he holds the status of head of the household, with the other members being subordinates and dependents who serve him in exchange for his protection and rewards. This forms a pyramidal structure organized around a set of hierarchically arranged households, dominated by that of the king (the 'crown'). It is also a 'family affair,' in which virtually all prominent figures are either members of the royal family or connected to it through marital alliances.

Proximity to the king is thus paramount. The imperial elite is composed of the king’s close relatives, including the king’s wives and children, as well as the key members of the administration and the military. This group of people can be considered his 'court,' which, in the narrow sense, includes members of his family, courtiers, and his household staff—that is, people who are in contact with him (without necessarily residing in a palace); in a broader sense, the court can be understood as all those who are likely to be in contact with the king, but are not necessarily physically in his presence.

=== Wives ===
King Shulgi was polygamous. In fact, he is the earliest king of Sumer known with certainty to have had multiple wives at the same time. It is not known whether these unions were necessarily marked by wedding ceremonies.. The king’s wives evidently had different statuses. It appears that at one point he had a single chief wife, who bore the title “Lady,” nin, and was thus the “Queen.” Next came several Junior/Secondary/Lesser wives, or “concubines, consort,” bearing the title lukur, which usually refers to a “nun” or “priestess” who is considered the wife of a god (this could therefore be a consequence of the king’s deification). There are variations of this title with enigmatic meanings: “beloved lukur” (ki-ág),“lukur of the road/journey” (kaskal-la) (because she accompanied the king on his travels?).

There is no evidence that these women played a role in the kingdom’s political and diplomatic affairs. Administrative texts, however, indicate that they played an active role in religious worship and possessed their own estates with holdings and servants, which they used in particular to provide offerings. It is also unclear whether they were organized according to the pattern of the “harem,” but it seems that the king’s secondary wives/concubines did not have freedom of movement.

Shulgi’s first queen is believed to have been Taram-Uram (“She Who Loves Ur”), a princess of Mari mentioned in a copy of an inscription that identifies her as the daughter of King Apil-kin and the “daughter-in-law” of King Ur-Namma. She does not appear in any texts dated to her husband's reign, which suggests that she died before or during the early part of it. Shulgi’s successor, Amar-Sin, may have been her son. A woman named Geme-Sin (“Servant of the god Sîn” in Sumerian; her name is also written in Akkadian as Amat-Sin) seems to have succeeded her in this role, but there is also little evidence for her.

Shulgi’s third queen is believed to have been Shulgi-simti (or Shulgi-shimtum), “Shulgi (is) my pride” (?), a name she received upon her marriage to the king. Possibly a native of Eshnunna, she is much better documented than her predecessors, since an archive from Puzrish-Dagan records her activities: she headed a sort of 'foundation' that made offerings to temples. T. Sharlach, however, views her more as a lesser wife.

Other wives or concubines of Shulgi are known, such as Nin-kalla (“The Sister is Precious”), perhaps his last chief wife, Geme-Ninlila (“Servant of the Goddess Ninlil”), attested toward the end of his reign, Šuqurtum, Simat-Ea, and Ea-nisha, documented primarily after Shulgi’s death. The list of Shulgi’s potential concubines does not end there, as other women associated with the court may have been among them; however, too little is known about them to determine their exact status, such as the court musicians.

=== Children ===
The king’s children appear in the records with the title “son/daughter of the king.” Based on what can be deduced from the sources, Shulgi had at least thirty children. This is a conservative estimate, given that several others may appear in the records without being explicitly identified as the king’s children, and that it is likely that many others died in infancy or during the first three decades of his reign, which are poorly documented.

Depending on whether they were boys or girls, they were assigned different roles, but always in the service of their father's (and the kingdom's) interests.

Seventeen (or sixteen) “sons of the king” (dumu lugal) have been identified. They were often employed in the empire’s military apparatus, frequently serving as generals or military governors (šagina; a role involving the command of troops in the field or garrisons) or in less senior positions ('captain'), but they could also be assigned to various types of missions, particularly economic or diplomatic ones, and, though more rarely, to provincial administration. In general, they held their posts for a short time, which allowed their father to respond quickly to immediate needs and also to prevent them from gaining too much influence and posing a threat to his authority. Among the most important, Shu-Enlil served as military governor in Uruk and Der and appears to have successfully participated in (or even led) military campaigns toward the end of the reign, before his status declined following Shulgi’s succession (although he may not necessarily have died then).

It is unclear whether the title of crown prince existed during this period. Amar-Sin, the son who succeeded Shulgi, does not appear in the records until he ascends the throne. The most commonly cited explanation for this is that he took a throne name upon assuming power and he is one of the princes known from the earlier records. Other possibilities have been suggested, related to the fact that Shulgi’s succession was murky: Amar-Sin may have been exiled and then returned to seize power; or he may not have been Shulgi’s son, but his nephew.

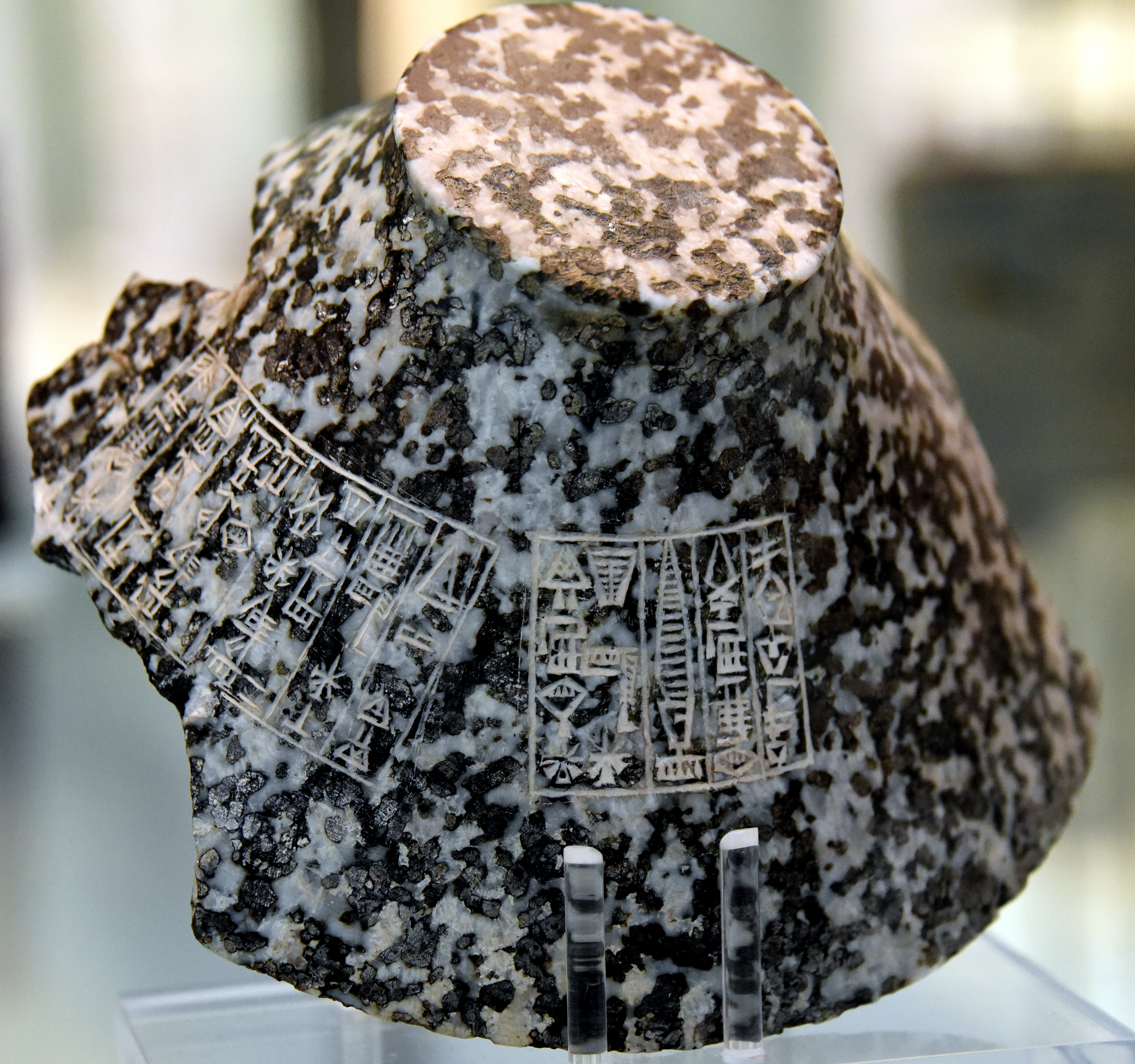
A fragmentary stone bowl bearing a first inscription in the name of King Naram-Sin of Akkad, to whom it had belonged, and a second in the name of a daughter of Shulgi named Simat-Enlil (or Me-Enlil), who in turn owned it. Ur, British Museum. Translation of the princess’s inscription: "Shulgi, mighty man, king of Ur, king of the four quarters: Simat-Enlil (is) his daughter."

Fourteen “daughters of the king” (dumu-munus lugal) have been identified with certainty. They were assigned two roles: to become high priestesses of a god, or to be married to their father’s allies, vassals or servants. Ennirziana was thus made a priestess of the god Nanna in Ur, as commemorated in the name of Shulgi’s 15th year. She was subsequently replaced by her sister Enurburziana (name of the 43rd year). As for marital alliances, year 18 records the marriage of Princess Liwwir-mittsashu to the king of the land of Marhashi, while year 30 commemorates that of an unnamed princess to the ruler of Anshan. Taram-Shulgi, for her part, married Shudda-bani of Pashime. As for the princesses who were wed to prominent members of the administration and the military, they helped consolidating the family- and patrimonial-based logic upon which the kingdom was built.

=== Senior Officials ===
Little is known about the organization of the upper echelons of the state apparatus during Shulgi’s reign.

The position of “vizier” (sukkalmah) appears to have been held by a single family, which seems to have originated in Girsu and which, according to P. Michalowski, may have obtained this key position following the peaceful annexation of this wealthy province during the reign of Ur-Namma. The earliest known vizier is Lani, who held the position around the years 29 and 32, followed by his son Ur-Shulpae in the subsequent years, and finally Arad-Nanna (or Aradmu), who assumed the position no later than the year 45 and held it throughout the following reigns for some thirty years (perhaps gradually becoming a sort of éminence grise of the kingdom).

The difficulty in identifying the roles of Shulgi’s top officials is evident in the case of the one who appears most frequently in administrative sources, a man named Naram-ili. His seal identifies him by the title ì.du_{8} sukkal, composed of terms meaning “gatekeeper” and “messenger” (or “emissary”), the meaning of which is enigmatic. In any case, he appears to have been very close to members of the royal family. His son Shu-Kabta, who was both a general and a physician, married a princess, Simat-Ištaran, with whom he administered an estate in Garshana after Shulgi’s reign, as documented by a substantial archive.

The identities of the servants of the king and of members of the royal family (particularly the queens) are found on cylinder seals, which bear inscriptions listing their personal names, their fathers’ names, and their titles (including the person they serve), and occasionally including blessings for the king. Often depicting so-called 'presentation' scenes of the seal holder before the king, they emphasize the connection between the two.

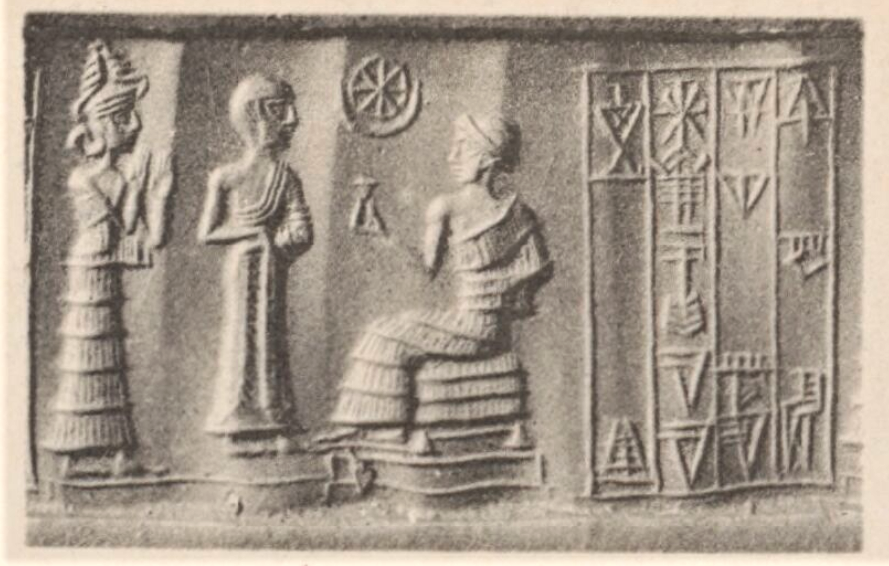
Impression of the cylinder seal of Shulgi-ili (“Shulgi (is) my god” in Akkadian), servant of Princess Baqartum, depicting a scene of presentation before the king. Louvre Museum.
Translation of the inscription: "Baqartum, daughter of the king: Shulgi-ili (is) your servant."

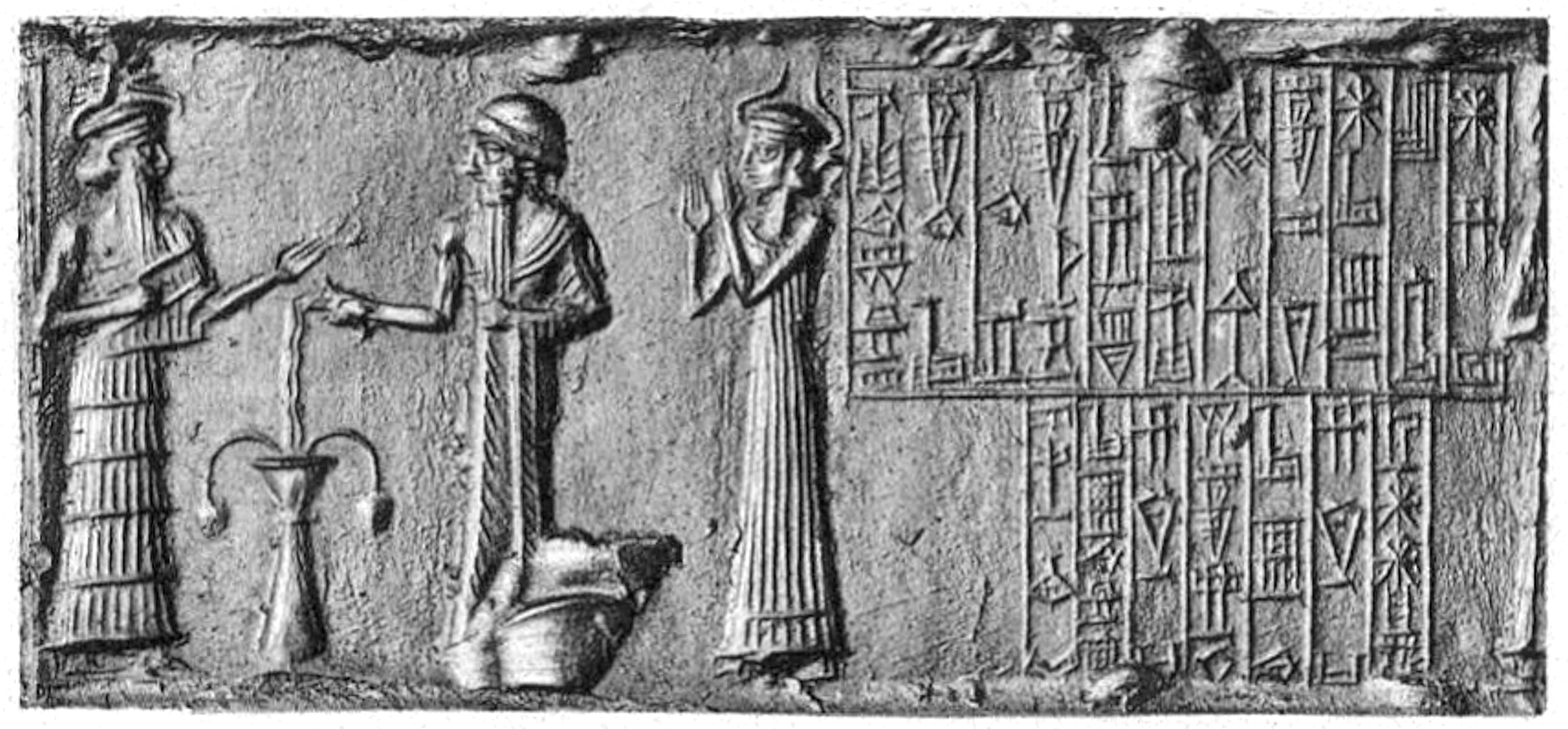
Impression of the cylinder seal of Ur-Nabnigal, governor of Nippur under Shulgi (original at the Louvre Museum).
Translation of the inscription: "To the god Nusku, grand-vizier of the god Enlil, his lord, for the life of Shulgi, king of Ur, king of the lands of Sumer and Akkad, Ur-Nabnigal, governor of Nippur, son of Lugal-engardu, governor of Nippur, dedicated (this seal)."

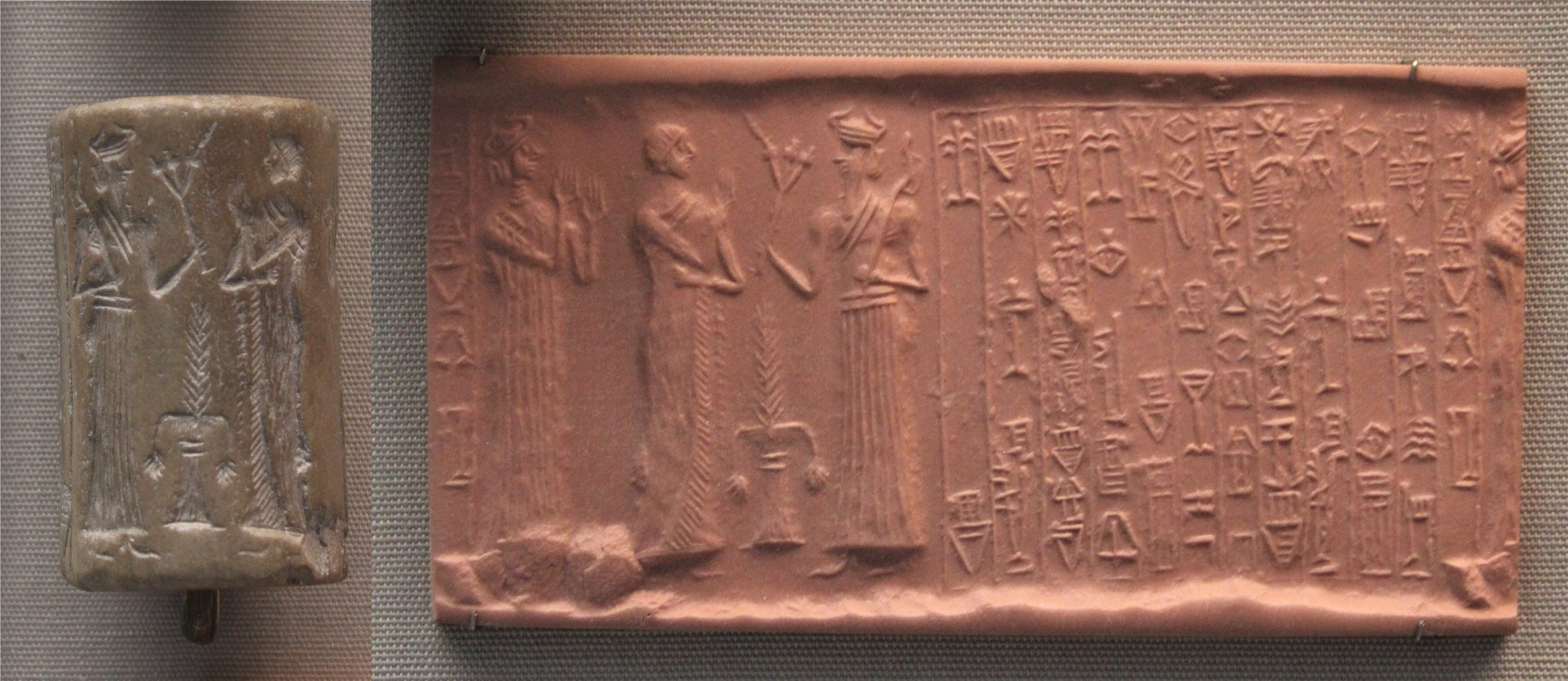
Seal of an official depicting him being introduced by a protective goddess in the presence of the god Meslamta-ea. British Museum.
Translation of the inscription: "For the god Meslamta-ea, the king (who is) the right arm of Lagash, for the life of Shulgi, mighty man, king of Ur, Kilula, the chair-bearer, son of Ur-Bagara, fashioned (this seal) for him. The name of this seal (is): “My king, let me live by his benevolent wisdom.”"

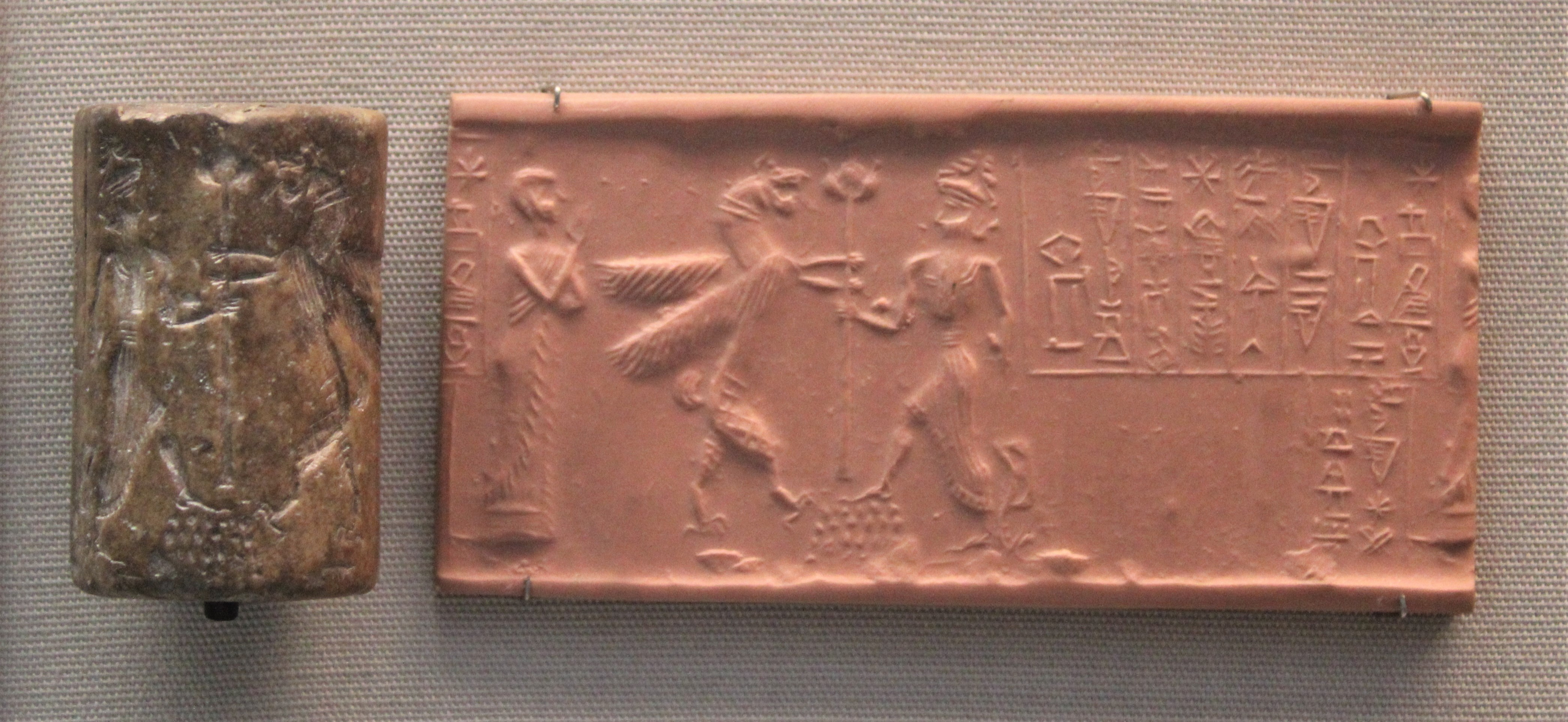
Seal of an unnamed official, depicting him before the war god Meslamta-ea and a griffin holding a banner planted on a mountain. British Museum.
Translation of the inscription: "For the god Meslamta-ea, his lord, for the life of Shulgi, god of his lands, king of Ur, king of the four quarters."

== Domestic and Foreign Policy ==
=== Territorial Reorganization ===
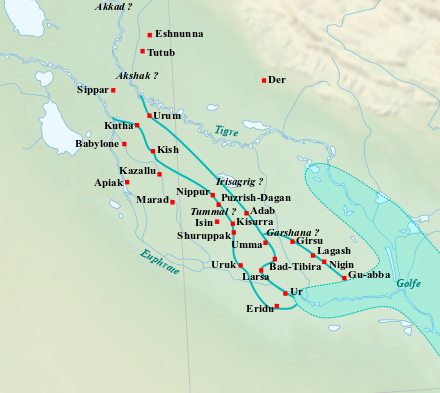
Location of the main sites in southern Mesopotamia during the Ur III period.

Shulgi had several palaces throughout his kingdom, which did not have a 'capital' in the strict sense of the word, and he often traveled with his court. The kings of Ur III had three major centers of power: Ur, Nippur, and Uruk. Shulgi and his successors seem to have preferred to reside in the province of Nippur (which also included the cities of Tummal and Puzrish-Dagan).

One of the major achievements of the reigns of Ur-Namma and Shulgi was the establishment of a provincial system that united the ancient kingdoms that had divided Lower Mesopotamia into a coherent and more tightly controlled entity. Governors were chosen from among the king’s close associates and were regularly reassigned, which strengthened their dependence on the monarch and deprived them of local roots. Some provinces have their capitals in cities bearing the name Shulgi, indicating that they were founded during this period, apparently in peripheral areas: Shulgi-Utu, whose governor Ur-hendursag is known from a seal; Ishim-Shulgi (in the Diyala River valley or on the Tigris), whose governor was Lugal-pa-è, a son of Shulgi. The construction of Puzrish-Dagan (Drehem), on the site of a minor settlement, to turn it into one of the kingdom’s main administrative centers (see below), was also part of this policy of territorial reorganization.

New lands were developed, with the creation of new villages: a cadastral tablet documents the settlement named Uru-Shulgi-sipad-kalama, “City of Shulgi, the Shepherd of the Land,” located in the province of Girsu, where there is an estate entrusted to a military officer, which appears to have been founded during this king’s reign as part of his agrarian policy.

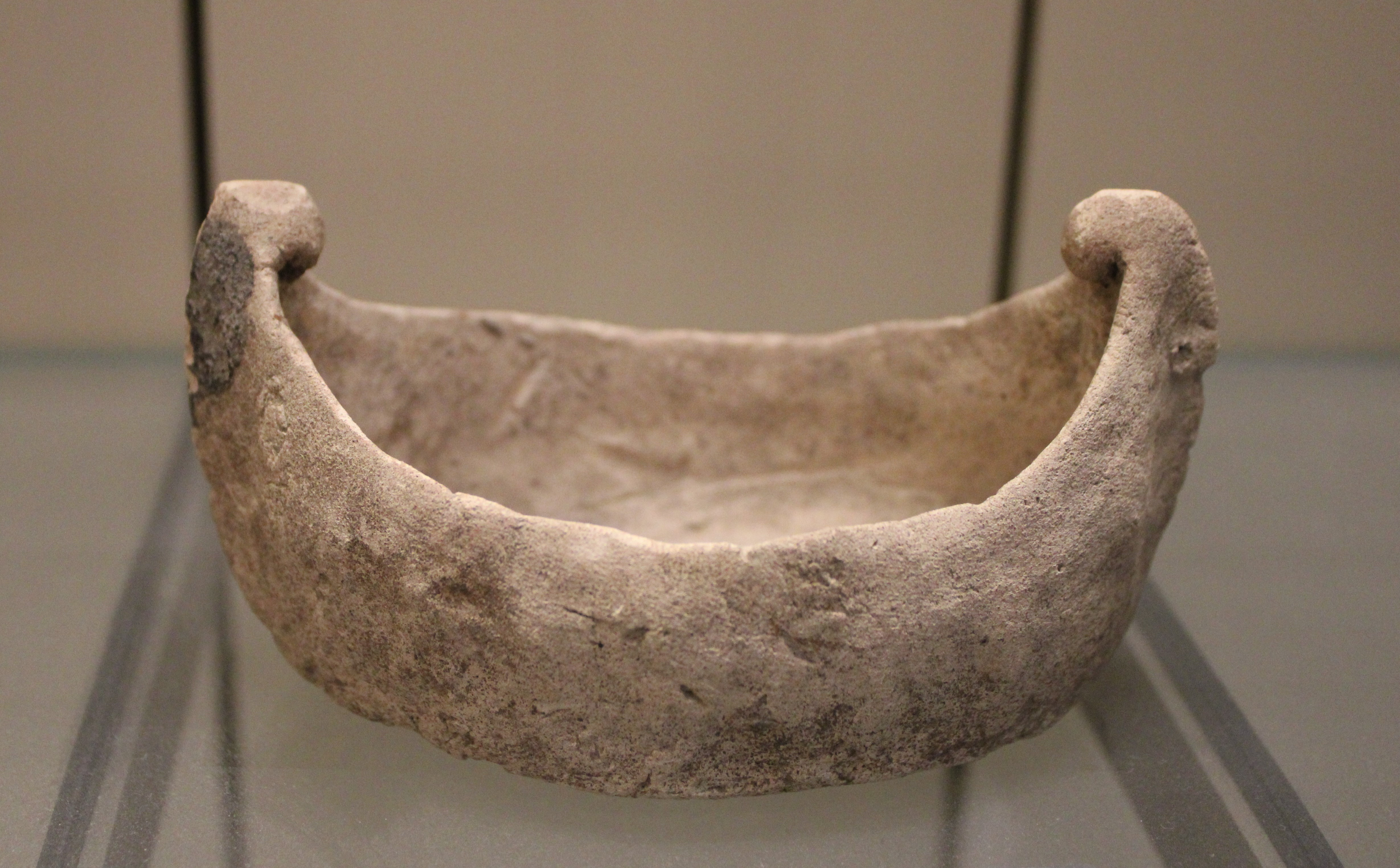
Terracotta boat model. Girsu, c. 2200–2000 BC. Louvre Museum.

Strengthening the empire’s cohesion also involved expanding and improving the reliability of the communications network, which relied on roads and waterways. Here again, this was a continuation of the policies established during the reign of Ur-Namma. The name of Shulgi’s 6th regnal year thus commemorates the construction of roads around Nippur: "Year in which the king put the roads around Nippur in order." These works are also mentioned in a passage from the hymn Shulgi A. Administrative tablets document this network of roads and relay stations, which was traveled by messengers and official envoys. Public works also focused on the canal network, which was closely linked to the former due to the importance of river navigation in southern Mesopotamia (they were also used for irrigating fields). Several canals documented in texts from the Ur III period bear the king’s name, implying that they were dug during his reign, such as Shulgi-hegal, “Shulgi (is) abundance,” or Shulgi-pirig, “Shulgi (is) a lion.”

Shulgi’s reign was marked by the construction of a defensive structure, known by year 37's name, commemorating the building of the “wall of the periphery” (bad_{3} ma-da). This structure is believed to have been located in the northern part of Lower Mesopotamia, north of Nippur but south of Kish and Babylon. It is not known what it looked like, as no physical traces have been found: was it a true 'great wall,' a smaller wall, or a series of forts and garrisons? If we consider the purposes of this 'wall,' in addition to its defensive function (against the Amorite threat?), it was undoubtedly intended to consolidate the empire’s borders and strengthen the protection of its heartland. Taking this a step further, it can be seen as an attempt to establish the boundary between the 'civilized' world and the 'wild' lands that were difficult to control.

Beyond the boundary thus defined, in the areas subjugated by the armies of Ur, a series of territories stretching along the Tigris, perhaps as far as Assur or even Nineveh, and east of this river in the Zagros foothills from Urbilum to Pashime and Susa, were transformed into a peripheral zone (ma-da), with shifting boundaries, serving as a defensive zone and a space for the collection of tribute, set apart from the heart of the empire, the “land” (kalam).

This was accompanied by the founding of garrison towns on the periphery, several of which bore the king’s name: this was the case with Shulgi-Nanna and Ishim-Shulgi, located in or near the Diyala Valley; a “Fort Shulgi” (Neber-Shulgi) is also attested. This can be seen as the establishment of a frontier zone similar to the Roman limes, comprising military settlements that mixed populations from Lower Mesopotamia—particularly soldiers—with the local inhabitants. These settlements were overseen by military governors, notably the šagina "generals," and had agricultural lands at their disposal. These regions did not contribute to the bala redistribution system, but were subject to a levy called gún ma-da, the “tax of the periphery,” paid through the delivery of livestock and collected by the agency of Puzrish-Dagan or one of its “branches.”

=== A Reforming King ===
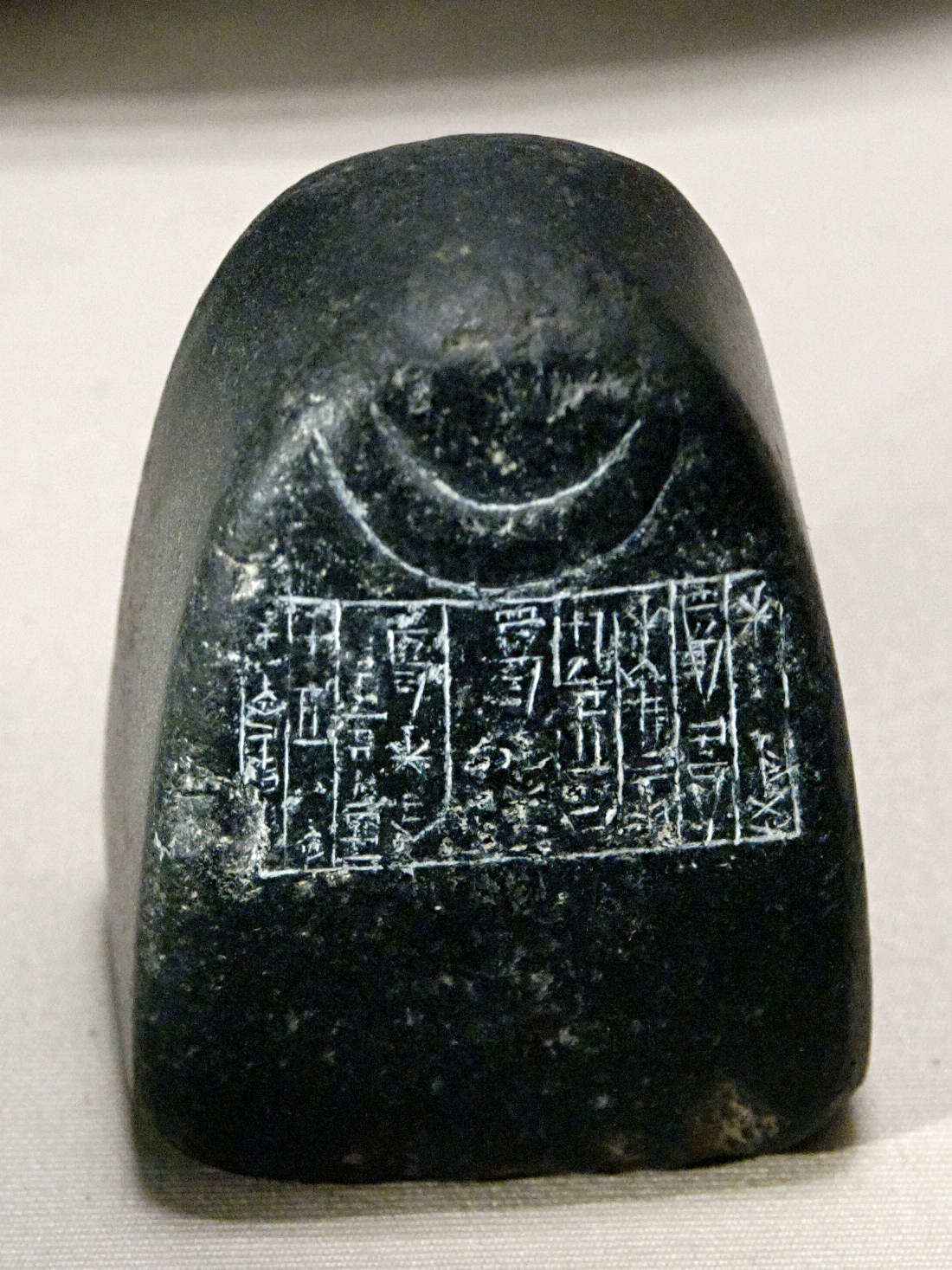
A weight of a half-mina dedicated to the moon god by Shulgi, Louvre Museum. Translation of the inscription: "For the god Nanna, his lord, Shulgi, mighty man, king of Ur, king of the four quarters, confirmed (this weight stone to be) one-half mina."

When Shulgi ascended the throne, much of the kingdom-building had already been accomplished—or at least begun—through measures taken during the reign of his father, Ur-Namma: the establishment of provinces, the expansion of the communications network, the standardization of administrative practices and norms, as well as his “code of law”. In many areas, Shulgi built upon his father’s achievements and continued along the path he had laid out. The year names indicate continuity in Shulgi’s policies relative to his father’s during at least the first twenty years of his reign. It was only thereafter that he undertook a series of significant, innovative, measures. According to P. Steinkeller’s proposals, this involved a set of reforms that led to the creation of a centralized empire. Other scholars of the period who have examined the issue (notably H. Waetzoldt and W. Sallaberger) dispute the existence of some of these measures. The idea of a period of major changes reshaping the empire’s organization is nevertheless generally accepted (and also includes the deification of the king and the royal 'propaganda' program).

The changes highlighted are numerous and varied:

- Reorganization of military recruitment, which appears to mark the beginning of the reforms (name of the 20th year: “Year the citizens of Ur were recruited as spearmen”) but whose nature remains poorly understood; it is nevertheless significant that military campaigns became more regular just after.
- Reorganization of the management of temple estates and land ownership in general (known by the rather long name of the 21st year: "Year Ninurta, the great 'field manager' of Enlil, prononced an oracle in the temples of Enlil and Ninlil, (and) Shulgi, the king of Ur, reorganized the fields and accounts belonging to the temples of Enlil and Ninlil"), leading to a redistribution in favor of royal authority, or at least greater central control over temple estates. This reform was also intended to expand cultivated areas, with new villages populated by displaced peasants.
- Creation of a system for training scribes, based on institutions called “Houses of Tablets” (é-dubba); this was accompanied by a surge in the number of scribes and the production of administrative tablets during the second half of his reign; furthermore, the beginnings of a standardization of the formats and forms of administrative tablets also emerged, though each office retained its own specific characteristics..
- Reorganization of weights and measures (as evidenced by various stone weights bearing an inscription by Shulgi).
- Introduction of an 'imperial' calendar, based on the one in use at Ur, employed by the royal administration (without replacing local calendars).
- Creation of a state-wide 'taxation' system for the collection and redistribution of goods (bala, meaning “turn” or “rotation,” “cycle”) centered around specialized hubs serving primarily as warehouses, including Puzrish-Dagan.

It has also been suggested that the "Code of Ur-Namma" was actually Shulgi's, but it is generally attributed to Ur-Namma, whose name appears in the text, unlike that of his son.

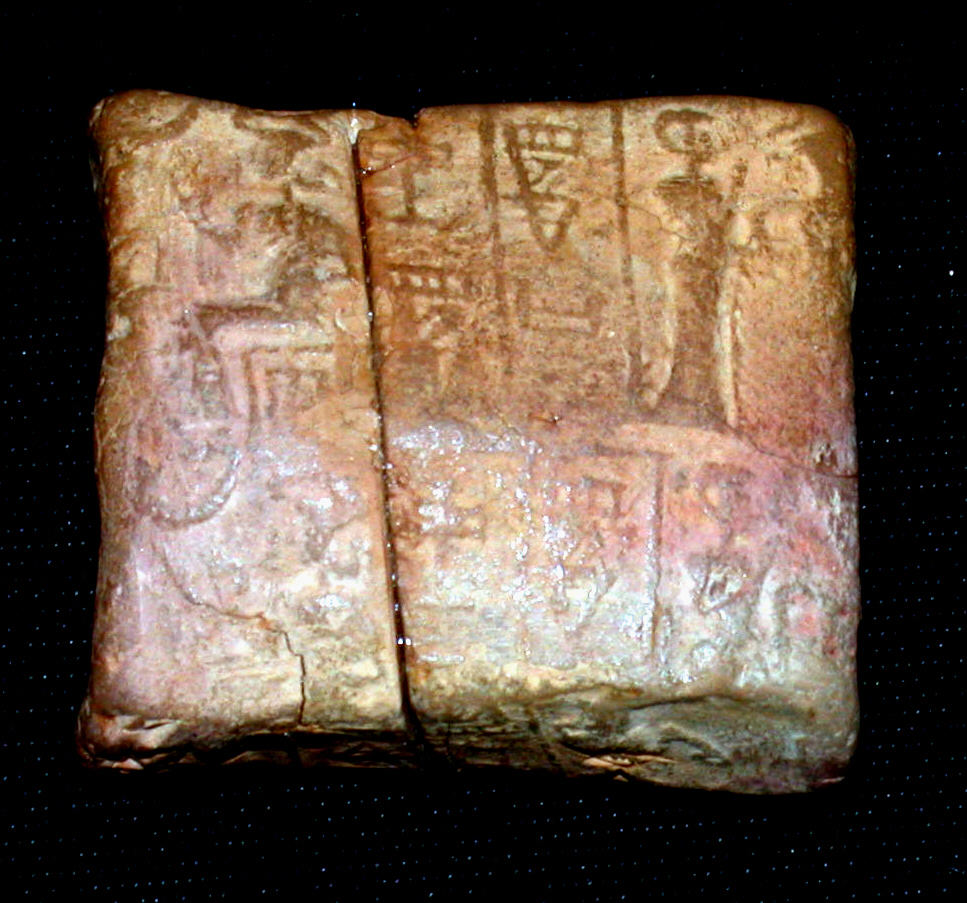
Small administrative tablet from Puzrish-Dagan, a receipt for a girl, bearing an administrator’s seal. 44th year of Shulgi’s reign. Metropolitan Museum of Art.

The most spectacular example of the policy of tighter control over the empire’s resources implemented during Shulgi’s reign is the construction of Puzrish-Dagan (the present-day site of Drehem). These works are mentioned in the year name 39, in its most common formulation "Year Puzrish-Dagan was built," repeated in the year names 40 and 41, which underscores the significance of the event (or, at the very least, that nothing more important occurred in those years), coinciding with the surge in administrative documentation resulting from the various reforms undertaken in previous years. This involved the construction of a large complex of warehouses, workshops, and administrative offices in the province of Nippur, where the court often resided. The archives of Puzrish-Dagan indeed indicate that, beginning in year 43, this site served as a center for the collection and redistribution of goods, primarily livestock and animal products (it is often seen as a sort of big cattleyard). It appears to have functioned as a central warehouse on an imperial scale, with 'branch offices' in other cities (notably Ur and Uruk).

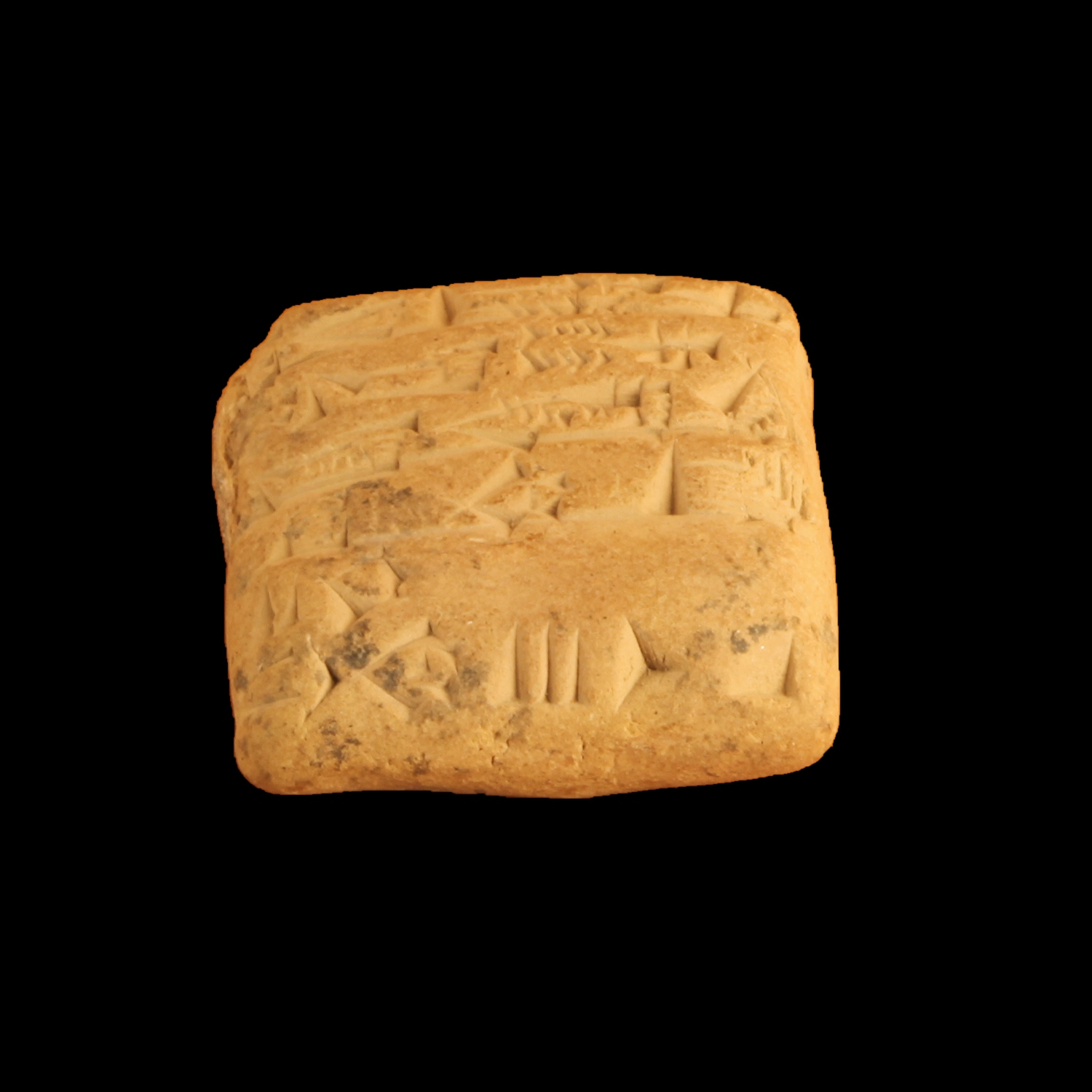
Small tablet recording the delivery of cattle to a person responsible for fattening them, dated to the 35th year of Shulgi’s reign and originating from Umma. Museum of Fine Arts of Lyon.

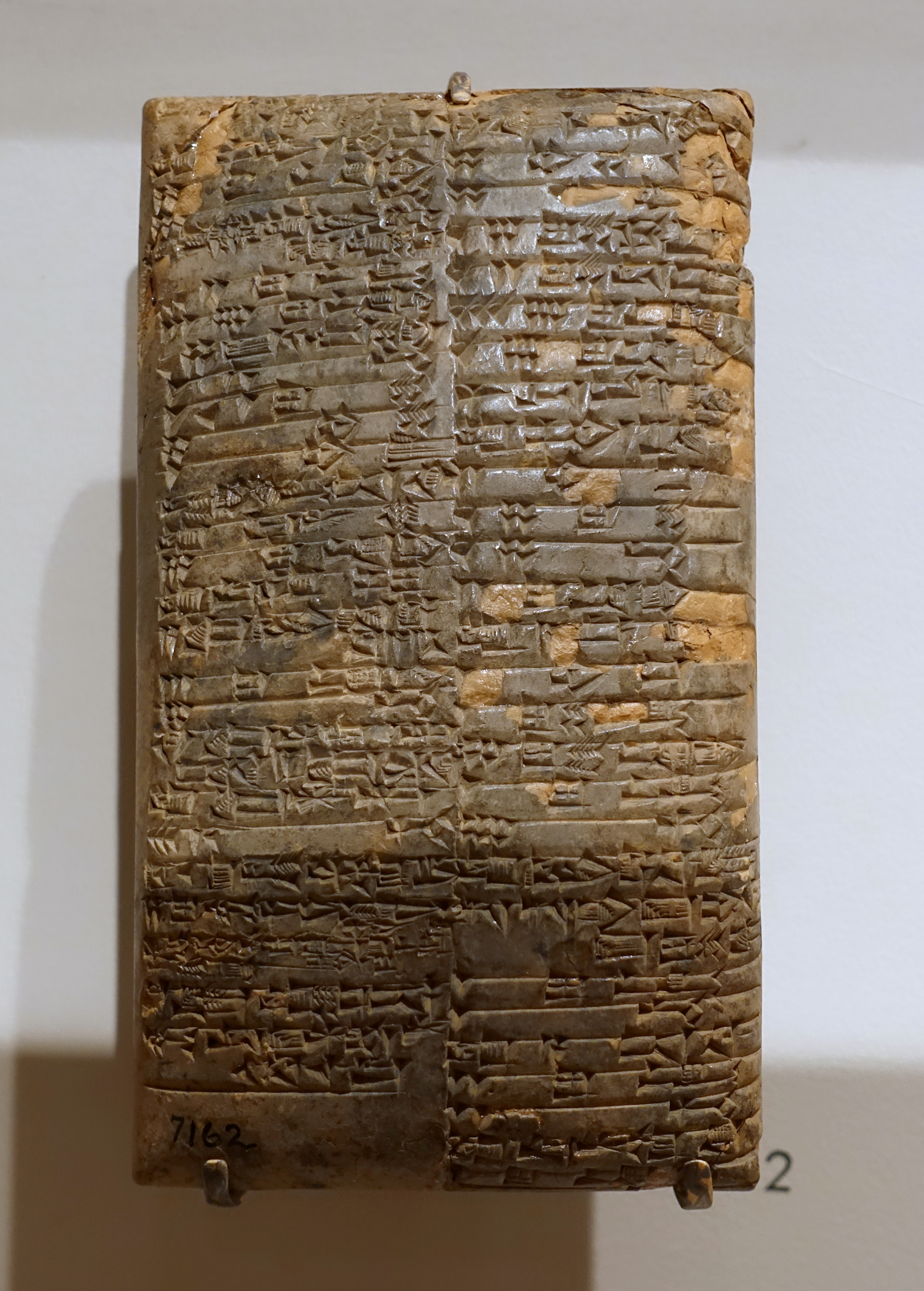
Tablet recording livestock delivered by an institution. 35th year of Shulgi’s reign, Umma. Harvard Semitic Museum.

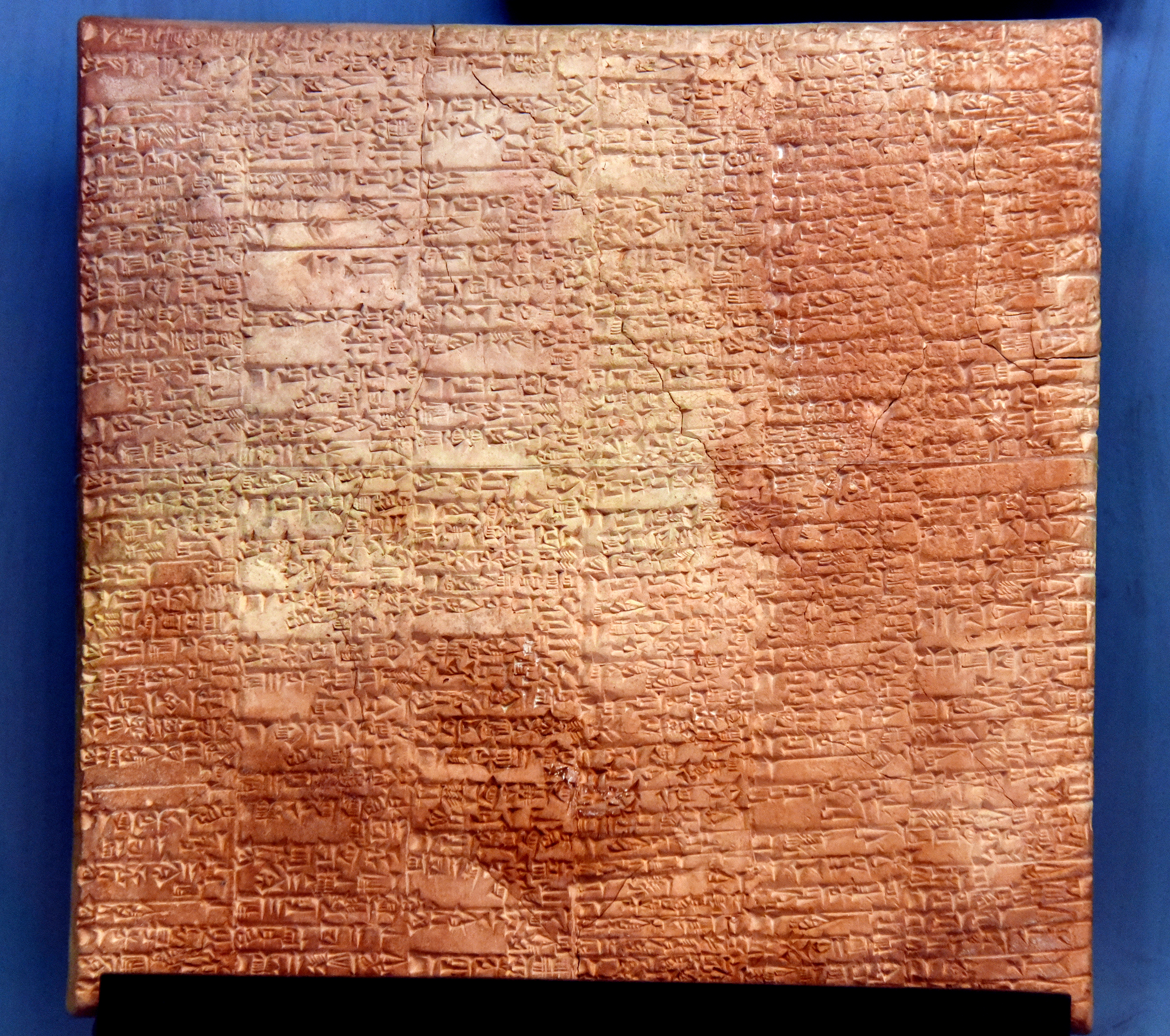
Large inventory tablet dating from the final year of Shulgi’s reign (48), from Lagash. Museum of the Ancient Orient in Istanbul.

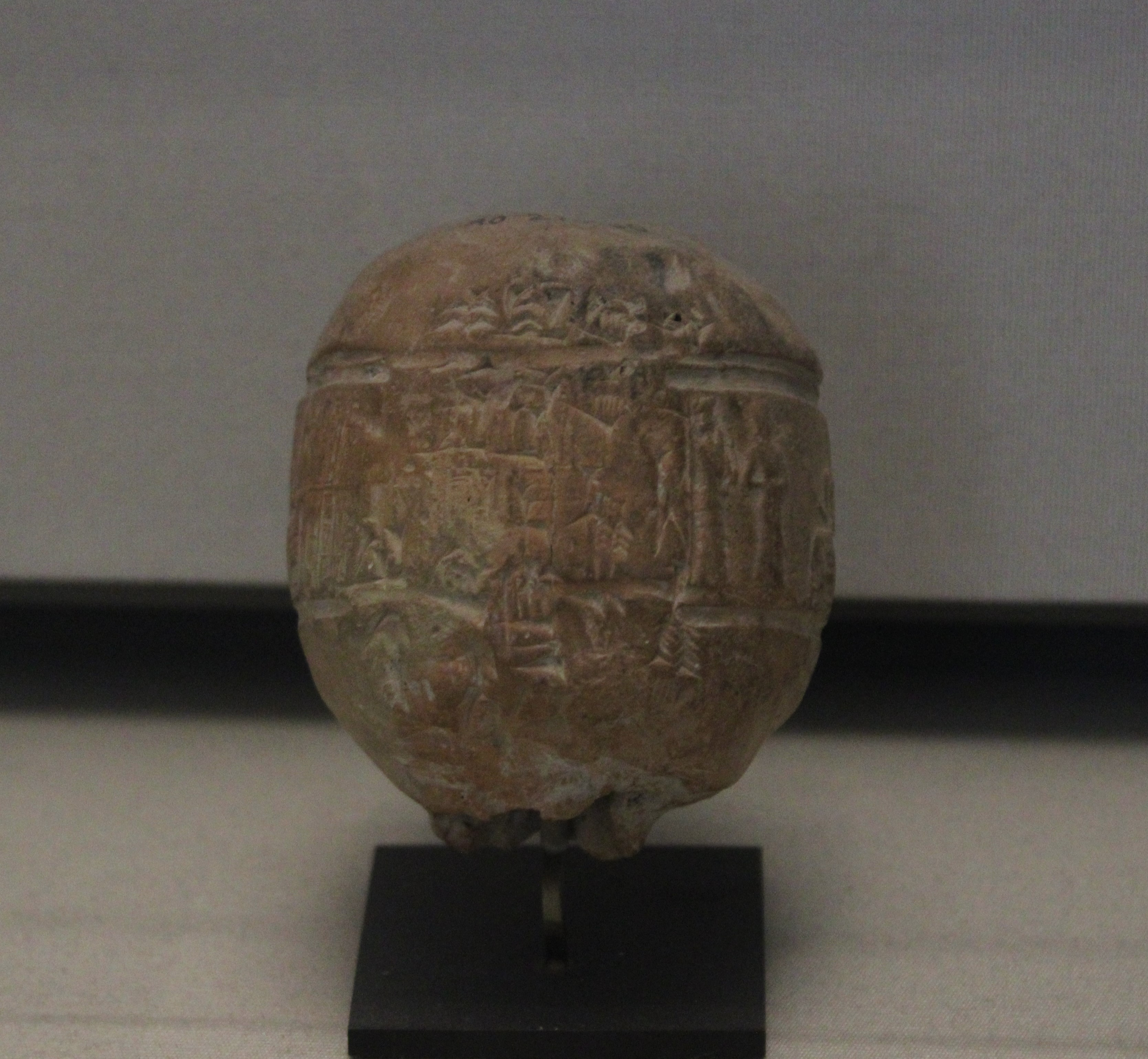
Clay bulla that sealed the ties of a bundle, bearing the impression of the seal of Naram-ili, an official during the reign of Shulgi. Louvre Museum.

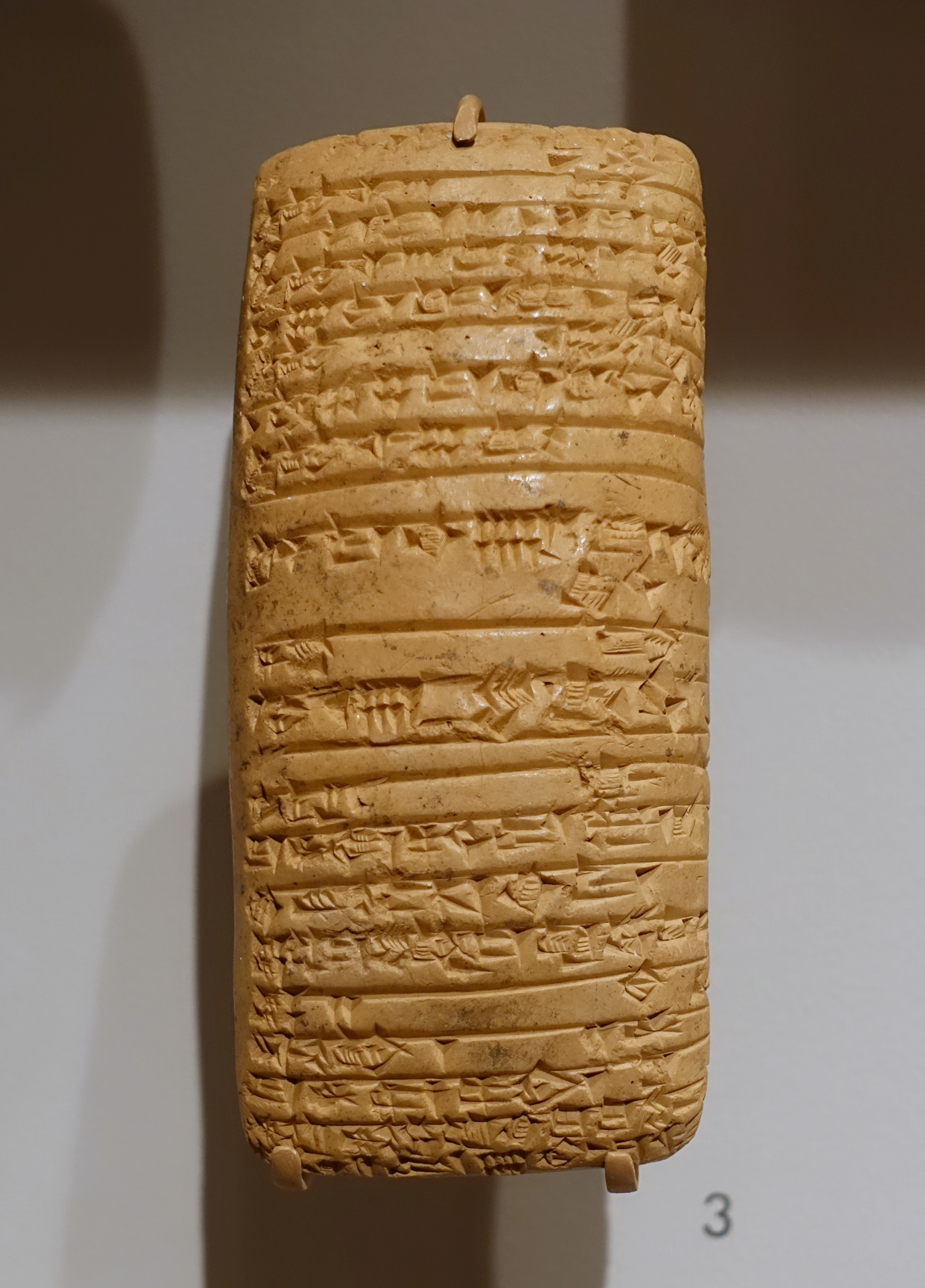
Tablet recording the goods sold by a merchant on behalf of an institution. Girsu, 44th year of Shulgi’s reign. Harvard Semitic Museum.

=== Foreign Relations ===
Studies of Shulgi's regnal year names indicate that, at least beginning in the 25th year—and certainly after the military reform—the army of Ur went to war nearly every year. Data on spoils (namrak) contained in the administrative archives corroborate several of these conflicts and point to the existence of other military campaigns. However, it is not known whether Shulgi personally took part in any military campaigns.

The objectives of these expeditions are a matter of debate and were likely varied: while they certainly served to expand the kingdom’s influence, they were likely also, in large part, intended to keep potential threats at bay, to control trade routes, and (above all?) to secure tribute and plunder, which was then shared among the empire’s elite, primarily for the benefit of the royal family. This included livestock, the redistribution of which among the elite took on great significance in administrative documentation.

Military campaigns were directed primarily toward regions north and east of the kingdom’s heartland. The first series of offensives focused primarily on regions in the western Zagros Mountains: Der, which controlled a major route into this area, and then directly within it at Simurrum, Karakin, and Harshi. These remained targets thereafter (Simurrum is mentioned in no less than nine year names). The end of Shulgi's reign was also marked by campaigns against northern countries east of the Tigris: Lullubum, Shashrum, Urbilum, and Arrapḫum. Documents dating from the 40s of Shulgi’s reign also mention prisoners from the land of the Amorites) who originated in Upper Mesopotamia and Syria but roamed a much wider area (as far as Jebel Hamrin and east of the Tigris). Amorite tribes may already have been enemies, but this became particularly evident during subsequent reigns. The Elamite states, notably Pashime and Anshan, seem to have generally been treated more as allies, as did the more distant country of Marhashi. As for the kingdoms of the northwestern regions (Mari, Urkesh, Nagar), they do not appear to have been enemies. This may be due to the presence of hostile Amorite tribes in the regions separating them from the kingdom of Ur, or to the fact that Mari was too powerful a rival, making an alliance with it a more prudent choice.

In fact, the foreign policy of the Third Dynasty of Ur seems to have relied largely on diplomacy aimed at ensuring good relations with various foreign rulers, whom Shulgi regarded as mere “governors” (ensi_{2}), since only he was a “king” (lugal). This represents a major shift from the Akkadian Empire, which had made these regions the targets of several of its military campaigns. The marriage alliances mentioned above are the most obvious indications of this trend, even if they were not always conclusive: the Elamite kingdom of Anshan was the subject of an attempt to forge a lasting alliance, as the 18th year of Shulgi’s reign commemorates the marriage of a princess of Ur to its ruler; nevertheless, the attempt failed, as a conflict broke out between the two kingdoms shortly thereafter.

== Aftermath and Legacy ==
A text dated to the days following Shulgi's death (the second day of the eleventh month of his 48th year of reign) indicates that offerings were already being made to him at a site dedicated to funerary worship (ki-a-nag, “place where water libations are poured”). An administrative text from Puzrish-Dagan from the same month (date unspecified), concerning young female slaves, bears the notation "the day Shulgi ascended to heaven." This indicates that he was believed to have ascended to the celestial realm of the gods, and not to the subterranean underworld where, according to Mesopotamian beliefs, the spirits of the deceased go. Subsequently, texts listing his funerary offerings identify him as “Shulgi of Heaven” (Šulgi an-na). Moreover, the Ehursag is described in a hymn as the temple of “Shulgi of Heaven.” His divine status is thus confirmed, and his successor, Amar-Sin, sought to expand his cult, notably through a special levy to provide sacrificial offerings for him. Records from subsequent reigns indicate that sacrifices were dedicated to his throne, and he was listed among the gods regularly honored at Nippur.

As he himself had wished in his hymns—and particularly in his Testament (Shulgi E)—texts glorifying him were copied long after his death, even after the fall of the Ur III dynasty. The hymns in which he is the subject are known from copies dating to the Old Babylonian period (c. 1900-1700 BC) unearthed in schools, mostly in Nippur and Ur. Some of his inscriptions were also copied by scribes during the same period. His hymns served as models for the composition of those dedicated to King Ishme-Dagan of Isin (c. 1955–1937 BC).

Furthermore, new compositions from the Old Babylonian period mention him: letters from the “Correspondence of the Kings of Ur,” generally considered apocryphal and written during this period, refer to him; “historical omens,” part of a larger collection of divinatory texts that refer to the deeds of illustrious kings of the past, allude to his reign. Texts from the Middle and Neo-Babylonian periods also feature him in a distinctly Babylonian religious and political context: the Prophecy of Shulgi (12th century BC?) is a narrative in which Shulgi, speaking in the first person, presents himself as a king who ruled the world and founded Nippur, prophesies the decline of Babylonia at the hands of the Assyrians and then its revival; in I Am Shulgi (or I, Shulgi; 8th century BC?) he presents himself as a worshipper of the Babylonian god Marduk, who defeated Assyria. He also appears in Late Babylonian historical chronicles, in a more negative light, such as the Weidner Chronicle or the Esagil Chronicle, where he is portrayed as an impious king who harmed the cult of Marduk and was punished accordingly. A later text from the Seleucid period (251 BC) originating from Uruk portrays him in the same way as a bad ruler who undermined the cult of the great local god Anu.

== Bibliography ==
- Frayne, Douglas (1997). Ur III Period (2112–2004 BC). RIM The Royal Inscriptions of Mesopotamia. Toronto: University of Toronto Press. ISBN 978-1-4426-2376-7.
- Garfinkle, Steven J. (2022). "The Kingdom of Ur". In Radner, Karen; Moeller, Nadine; Potts, Daniel T. (eds.). The Oxford History of the Ancient Near East, Volume 2: From the End of the Third Millennium bc to the Fall of Babylon. New York: Oxford University Press. pp. 121–189.
- Klein, Jacob (1981a). Three Šulgi hymns: Sumerian royal hymns glorifying King Šulgi of Ur. Ramat-Gan: Bar-Ilan University Press..
- Klein, Jacob (1981b). "The Royal Hymns of Shulgi King of Ur: Man's Quest for Immortal Fame". Transactions of the American Philosophical Society. 71 (7): 1–48. JSTOR 1006438..
- Klein, Jacob (1995). "Shulgi of Ur: King of a Neo-Sumerian Empire" (PDF). In Jack M. Sasson (ed.). Civilizations of the Ancient Near East. New York: Scribner. pp. 843–857.
- Lafont, Bertrand (2017). "Ur, l'empire gestionnaire (2100–2000)". Mésopotamie : De Gilgamesh à Artaban (3300–120 av. J.-C.). Mondes anciens (in French). Paris: Belin. pp. 201–249.
- Michalowski, Piotr (2008). "The Mortal Kings of Ur: A Short Century of Divine Rule in Ancient Mesopotamia". In Brisch, Nicole (ed.). Religion and Power: Divine Kingship in the Ancient World and Beyond. Chicago: The Oriental Institute. pp. 33–45.
- Sallaberger, Walther (1999). "Ur III-Zeit". Mesopotamien: Akkade-Zeit und Ur III-Zeit. Orbis Biblicus et Orientalis (in German). Freiburg and Göttingen: Universitätsverlag Freiburg Schweiz and Vandenhoeck & Ruprecht. pp. 121–390.
- Sallaberger, Walther (2012). "Šulgi". Reallexikon der Assyriologie und Vorderasiatischen Archäologie (in German). Vol. XI. pp. 270–280.
- Sharlach, Tonia M. (2017a). An Ox of One's Own: Royal Wives and Religion at the Court of the Third Dynasty of Ur. Berlin and Boston: De Gruyter.
- Sharlach, Tonia M. (2017b). ""Šulgi, Mighty Man, King of Ur"" (PDF). In Drewnowska, Olga; Sandowicz, Małgorzata (ed.). Fortune and Misfortune in the Ancient Near East. Winona Lake. pp. 211–220.
- Sharlach, Tonia M. (2022). "Princely Employments in the Reign of Shulgi". Journal of Ancient Near Eastern History. 9 (1): 1–68..
- Steinkeller, Piotr (1987). "The Administrative and Economic Organization of the Ur III State: The Core and the Periphery". In McGuire Gibson and Robert D. Biggs (ed.). The Organization of Power: Aspects of Bureaucracy in the ancient Near East. Chicago: The Oriental Institute if the University of Chicago. pp. 19–41.
- Steinkeller, Piotr (2017). History, Texts and Art in Early Babylonia. Berlin and Boston: De Gruyter.
- Steinkeller, Piotr (2021). "The Sargonic and Ur III Empires". In Bang, Peter Fibiger; Bayly, C.A.; Scheidel, Walter (eds.). The Oxford World History of Empire. Oxford: Oxford University Press. pp. 43–72.
- Vacin, Ludek (2010). Šulgi of Ur: Life, Deeds, Ideology and Legacy of a Mesopotamian Ruler As Reflected Primarily in Literary Texts. Londres: PhD diss. School of Oriental and African Studies (University of London). (unpublished PdD)
- Vacin, Ludek (2015). "Tradition and Innovation in Šulgi's Concept of Divine Kingship". In Archi, Alfonso (ed.). Tradition and Innovation in the Ancient Near East: Proceedings of the 57th Rencontre Assyriologique International at Rome, 4-8 July 2011. University Park: Penn State University Press. pp. 179–192.
- Weiershäuser, Frauke (2008). Die königlichen Frauen der III. Dynastie von Ur (PDF) (in German). Göttingen: Universitätsverlag Göttingen.

== See also ==
- Correspondence of the Kings of Ur
- History of Sumer
- List of Mesopotamian dynasties
- Sumerian king list
- Self-praise of Shulgi

Regnal titles
Preceded by Ur-Nammu	King of Ur c. 2094 – c. 2046 BC	Succeeded by Amar-Sin
