= Geme-Ninlilla =

Geme-Ninlilla (fl. c. 2070 BC) might have been a wife of Shulgi, second king of the Third Dynasty of Ur. She is best attested in the last years of the king's reign and seems to be a major figure at the royal court.

She is not as well attested in ancient sources as the other royal women of Shulgi, but those texts provide evidence for her importance. However, her proper position is uncertain.

It is possible that she did not bear the title of a queen. Not much is known about her family. Her parents are unknown, but it is possible that a certain woman called Geme-Nann was her and Shulgi's daughter. She is known from her own seal, showing her standing in front of a king. The scene is unusual as normally people in front of the king are introduced by a guardian spirit. The latter is missing here. Geme-Ninlilla is standing directly in front of the king. In an inscription, she is referred to as being Shulgi's "beloved". A number of economic texts show that she managed an estate and was also founder of a religious foundation. It seems possible that she had her own palace.

== Literature ==
- Sharlach, Tonia M. (2017). An Ox of One's Own, Royal Wives and Religion at the Court of the Third Dynasty of Ur. Berlin/Boston: Walter de Gruyter GmbH. ISBN 978-1-5015-1447-0.
