= Simat-Ea =

Simat-Ea (also called Me-Ea, reading uncertain; fl. c. 2070 BC) might have been a concubine or consort of Shulgi, second king of the Third Dynasty of Ur. She appears in several texts of the period, but her exact position is unknown. She was most likely a concubine of the king, but it is also possible that she was his daughter. Simat-Ea appears in several lists of royal women where these women received goods or animals. The other women in these lists are queens or concubines known from other sources providing the impression that Simat-Ea was a concubine or queen too. The lists only provide the names of these women, not the titles.

== Literature ==
- Sharlach, Tonia M. (2017). An Ox of One's Own, Royal Wives and Religion at the Court of the Third Dynasty of Ur. Berlin/Boston: Walter de Gruyter GmbH. ISBN 978-1-5015-1447-0.
