= Šuqurtum =

Concubine of king Shulgi, second king of the Third Dynasty of Ur

Šuqurtum (fl. c. 2070 BC) was a concubine of king Shulgi, second king of the Third Dynasty of Ur. Unlike several other royal women of the king, she is not well attested in the surviving archaeological record. She is mentioned on a stone vase found at Ur, where she a called his beloved concubine (lukur is the word for concubine). Shulgi appears on the vase too. Otherwise, her name appears in a few economical texts, providing evidence that funerary offerings were made after her death.

== Literature ==
- Sharlach, Tonia M. (2017). An Ox of One's Own, Royal Wives and Religion at the Court of the Third Dynasty of Ur. Berlin/Boston: Walter de Gruyter GmbH. ISBN 978-1-5015-1447-0.
