= Lahar (god) =

Mesopotamian deity

- Deity of domestic animals and clothing
- Gender: disputed

Lahar was a Mesopotamian deity associated with flocks of animals, especially sheep. Lahar's gender is a topic of debate in scholarship, though it is agreed the name refers to a female deity in a god list from the Middle Babylonian period and to a male one in the myth Theogony of Dunnu.

== Name and character ==
Lahar's name was written syllabically as ^{d}La-ḫa-ar or ^{d}La-ḫar, or logographically as ^{d}U_{8}, "ewe." The name is derived from Akkadian laḫru, also meaning "ewe." The same logogram, ^{d}U_{8}, could also be used to write the name of another deity associated with herding, Šunidug ("his hand is good") as well as of his father Ga'u (Gayu), the shepherd of Sin, and of the mother of Dumuzi, Duttur. A possible reference to Lahar occurs in a name from the Early Dynastic period in which the logogram ^{d}U_{8} serves as a theophoric element, ^{d}U_{8}.DU.

While Samuel Noah Kramer's early translations treated Lahar as a goddess, according to Wilfred G. Lambert the deity should be considered male. He argues only evidence for female Lahar is a god list which has been composed in the Middle Babylonian period or later, which gives the equation ^{d}U_{8} = ^{d}A-a šá ku-né-e, "Lahar is Aya (as the goddess) of caring for things," and the astronomical compendium MUL.APIN in which ^{mul}U_{8} is the star of the same goddess. However, Frans Wiggermann assumes that Lahar was a female deity, with Theogony of Dunnu being an exception.

According to Lambert, the deity Ninsig known from the god list An = Anum, who according to him was male and whose name he translates as "lord wool," is identical with Lahar. However, according to Dina Katz this deity was female.

Lahar was associated with flocks of domestic animals, especially sheep. Less commonly he was also connected with clothing.

== Mythology ==
The main source of information about Lahar is the text Lahar and Ashnan, also known as Ewe and Wheat or Debate between Sheep and Grain. The text does not explicitly state who was considered the creator of Lahar and Ashnan, though due to the fact that their place of origin is the Apsu Wilfred G. Lambert considered Enki (Ea) to be a plausible candidate. The creation of Lahar and Ashnan is also attributed to Ea in a building incantation. In the discussed poem, after drinking alcohol Lahar starts to bicker with Ashnan over which one of them provides humans with more useful goods, and eventually the conflict between them has to be settled by Enlil, who at Enki's suggestion proclaims the grain goddess the winner. According to Markham J. Geller, the passage about the origin of Ashnan and Lahar from this composition is directly quoted in the incantation series Udug Hul.

A distinct version of Lahar is known from the Theogony of Dunnu, also known as the Harab Myth. This narrative is only known from a single tablet from the Neo-Babylonian or Achaemenid which according to its colophon was copied from older examples. The time of its composition is difficult to evaluate, and Wilfed G. Lambert suggested any proposal between 2000 BCE and 614 BCE is plausible. Frans Wiggermann due to presence of Hurrian loanwords assumes it was composed between 1500 BCE and 1350 BCE, when parts of Mesopotamia were under the control of the Hurrian Mitanni state. It is presumed that it represents a local tradition about the early days of the world which developed in a settlement named Dunnu, "fortified place," though as multiple towns bearing this name are known, precise identification is uncertain. In this text, Lahar is a son of Šumugan and the personified sea, ^{d}A.AB.BA. He subsequently kills his father, marries the sea, and has a son whose name is damaged. Wiggermann suggests that he can be identified as the divine shepherd Gayu.
