= Aruru =

Aruru may refer to:

- Aruru, a Mesopotamian goddess of vegetation at some point conflated with Ninhursag
- Aruru (Keroro Land), a character in the anime and manga Sgt. Frog
- Aruruu, a character in the Japanese visual novel Utawarerumono
