= Ashnan =

Mesopotamian goddess of grain

- Goddess of grain
- Other names: Ezina, Ezina-Kusu

Ashnan or Ezina (^{d}še.tir; both possible readings are used interchangeably) was a Mesopotamian goddess considered to be the personification of grain. She could also be called Ezina-Kusu, which led to the proposal that the goddess Kusu was initially her epithet which only developed into a distinct figure later on. She was already worshiped in the Uruk period, and appears in documents from many Mesopotamian cities from the third millennium BCE. She is also known from various works of Mesopotamian literature, such as the debate poem Debate between Sheep and Grain.

== Names and character ==
The logogram ^{d}ŠE.TIR can be read as both Ezina and Ashnan. According to Jeremy Black, both are used interchangeably to refer to the same deity in modern publications. Frank Simons argues the latter can be understood as the "Akkadianised version" of Ezina. The Sumerian word ezina was also a common noun referring to grain. The Akkadian ašnan could be interpreted the same way. However, the precise etymology of both is uncertain. The goddess designated by these names was associated with grain and agriculture. Early on in her history, she was a major deity, but in later periods she was simply perceived as the divine hypostasis of grain. In addition to her primary role, she could be invoked alongside Nintur to stop post-natal bleeding.

It is possible that in art, Ashnan was depicted as a goddess surrounded by grain-like plants. In some cases this figure is depicted seated on a throne.

=== Ezina-Kusu ===
The compound theonym Ezina-Kusu, which combines the names of Ezina and Kusu, a goddess associated with ritual purification, is well attested. The Akkadian form Ashnan-Kusu is also known. The compound name already appears in sources from the Early Dynastic period. In most texts, it seemingly designates a deity analogous to Ezina, for example the hymnic composition preserved on the Gudea Cylinders states that "Ezina-Kusu, the pure stalk, will raise its head high in the furrows in Gu-edina", while The Debate between Sheep and Grain uses the double name interchangeably with that of the grain goddess. Frank Simons has suggested that Kusu was not a distinct goddess at first, but rather an epithet, and only developed into a separate figure at a later date. However, it has also been argued that Kusu treated as an epithet was not related to the purification goddess, and should be understood as a generic appellation, "goddess filled with purity". Ezina-Kusu is also attested as an epithet referring to Nisaba and Aruru in their respective vegetation-related roles.

== Worship ==
Under the name Ezina the Mesopotamian grain goddess was already worshiped in the Uruk period. According to the Archaic City List, a settlement named after her existed somewhere in Mesopotamia, though the reading of its full name remains unknown. She is one of the oldest attested city goddesses, with Nisaba, Nanshe, Inanna of Uruk and Inanna of Zabalam being the only other ones present in texts of comparable age.

The twenty-seventh of the Early Dynastic Zame Hymns from Abu Salabikh is dedicated to Ezina. In this composition her cult center is the settlement AB×ŠUŠ (U_{2}; the reading of this toponym remains unknown). However, it is not mentioned in the closely related Temple Hymns or any other later sources. Ezina is also present in the Fara and Abu Salabikh god lists.

Evidence for the worship of the grain goddess under either of her names is also available from Lagash, Adab, Umma, Ur, Nippur and Shuruppak. Alfonso Archi notes that she also occurs in a bilingual lexical list from Ebla, which gives the equation ^{d}Ašnan = A-za-na-an, but she is absent from the administrative texts from this city.

In the Ur III period a temple dedicated to her existed in Nippur, and offerings to her are mentioned in a text from Puzrish-Dagan. Joan Goodnick Westenholz suggested that she was worshiped in the temple of Kusu in Nippur, which according to Andrew R. George likely bore the ceremonial name Esaĝĝamaḫ, "house of the exalted purifier".

Theophoric names invoking her are known from various sources from the third millennium BCE. For example, multiple individuals named Amar-Ashnan ("young bull of Ashnan") appear in texts from Adab from the Early Dynastic and Sargonic periods. The same name, as well as other ones, such as Ashnan-amamu ("Ashnan is my mother"), are also attested in texts from Lagash.

A formula from the reign of Ishme-Dagan refers to Ezina, Enki, Ishkur and Šumugan as the "lords of abundance" (en ḫegallakene). The name Ashnan appears in a curse formula of Yahdun-Lim of Mari, in which she is invoked alongside Šumugan to punish anyone who would remove this king's foundation deposits by impoverishing his land. Some attestations of Ashnan are available from the corpus of Old Babylonian personal letters as well, where she appears with comparable frequency to Bau and Nisaba, though less often than the most popular goddesses, such as Ishtar, Annunitum or Aya. Seals inscribed with the formula "servant of Ashnan" or "servant of Ezina" are known too.

No evidence for active worship of the grain goddess under either of her names postdates the Old Babylonian period. However, she is still mentioned in the later god list An = Anum.

== Mythology ==
=== Ezina and her Seven Children ===
Copies of the Early Dynastic myth Ezina and her Seven Children are known exclusively from Abu Salabikh. Fragments of around fifteen exemplars have been recovered. Due to their state of preservation, full restoration of the plot is not possible.

While the myth contains a scene of intercourse between Ezina and the father of her children, his identity is uncertain. It is possible An played this role, though the passage mentioning his name is poorly preserved. The gender of the children is not explicitly specified, though it is possible six of them are male, with only the youngest being a goddess instead. She is born with a congenital defect, and subsequently has to survive without Ezina's help with only locusts to eat, until Enki intervenes on her behalf. It is known that the following sections involved Nanna, as indicated by a number of fragmentary lines, one of which praises his generosity, though his role in the narrative remains impossible to establish.

Since the youngest of Ezina's children is referred to as "digging mouse" (PEŠ_{2}.AL.DU_{3}), Manfred Krebernik and Jan Lisman suggest that this composition might have been a mythological explanation of the origin of mice, with Ezina's neglect of her daughter reflecting the fact that mice eat grain and can thus be considered enemies of the goddess representing it. Krebernik and Lisman note that the idea of a deified rodent finds a parallel in a gloss in the god list An = Anum (tablet V, line 200) which describes the mother of Namtar, Mardula'anki, as a mouse (ḫumunṣir), but conclude that a connection between her and Ezina's daughter cannot be established. However, they also postulate that referring to the child as a "digging mouse" might be metaphorical and reflect Ezina's contempt for her. Joan Goodnick Westenholz instead tentatively interpreted the myth as an etiological account of the invention of an unspecified foodstuff, possibly bread, with Ezina's children becoming the deities responsible for providing humans with it.

Ezina's seven children are not attested otherwise. However, Julia M. Asher-Greve proposes that a goddess with plants on her robe who in one case accompanies a possible depiction of enthroned Ezina represents one of her seven children. No allusions to any of the events described in Ezina and her Seven Children have been identified in any other texts. However, the motif of the birth of seven divine children is also known from the compositions preserved on the Barton Cylinder and the Gudea Cylinders. Furthermore, it has been argued that the portrayal of Ezina as a sexually active deity might have influenced her association with sexuality attested in the later myth Enki and the World Order.

=== Enki and the World Order ===
Ezina appears in the myth Enki and the World Order. Surviving copies date to the Old Babylonian period. Ezina is described in this context as the primary goddess of agriculture, the "good bread of the whole world". Her placement after Enkimdu in the sequence of deities Enki appoints to their positions reflects their association with different aspects of agriculture - grain production in the case of Ezina, plowing in the same of Enkimdu. Additionally, she is linked with human sexuality, which might reflect the belief that grain was ultimately necessary for all human activities. She is also addressed with the epithet innin (conventionally translated as "lady", though possibly bearing a similar implicit meaning as English virago), which is otherwise only attested for Inanna and less commonly for Nanshe.

Unlike most other goddesses who appear in Enki and the World Order, Ezina is not mentioned when Inanna complains to Enki that she was not assigned a specific function (garza).

=== Other texts ===
The debate poem Debate between Sheep and Grain involves Ashnan arguing with Laḫar (U_{8}), a sheep deity, over which of them is more important. The text begins with an account of creation, which relays that both of them were created because mankind had no food to eat and no clothes to wear. Both Ashnan and Laḫar raise many arguments in favor of their respective claim to superiority, but eventually Enki convinces Enlil to declare the grain goddess the winner, which according to Jeremy Black might reflect the belief that grain was more crucial for survival of mankind than domestic animals were.

An incantation recited during temple renovations lists Ashnan among deities created from clay by Ea.
