= Šulpae =

Mesopotamian god

- Astral god associated with disease
- Major cult center: Kesh
- Planet: Jupiter

Genealogy
- Spouse: Ninhursag
- Children: Ashgi, Panigingarra, Lisin, Lillu

Šulpae was a Mesopotamian god. Much about his role in Mesopotamian religion remains uncertain, though it is agreed he was an astral deity associated with the planet Jupiter and that he could be linked to specific diseases, especially bennu. He was regarded as the husband of Ninhursag. Among the deities considered to be their children were Ashgi, Panigingarra and Lisin. The oldest texts which mention him come from the Early Dynastic period, when he was worshiped in Kesh. He is also attested in documents from other cities, for example Nippur, Adab and Girsu. Multiple temples dedicated to him are mentioned in known sources, but their respective locations are unknown.

== Name ==
The earliest attested form of Šulpae's name in cuneiform is ^{d}Šul-pa-è, already found in Early Dynastic texts from Fara and Adab, though it gradually changed to ^{d}Šul-pa-è-a, which appears in some, though not all, of the Old Babylonian copies of the Kesh Temple Hymn, and most likely became the default in the first millennium BCE, though less common variants are also attested, for example ^{d}Šu-ul-pé. Contrary to assumptions in earlier scholarship, the theonyms ^{d}Šul-pa-è-dar-a and ^{d}Šul-pa-è-ùtul-a are no longer recognized as variants of his name, and are instead presumed to refer to separate deities.

In addition to the common romanization "Šulpae", other spellings can also be found in Assyriological publications, for example Šulpa'e (in the Reallexikon der Assyriologie und Vorderasiatischen Archäologie), Šul-pa-eda and Šul-pa-e.

It is agreed that Šulpae's name can be translated from Sumerian as "the youth shining forth" or "the young one shining forth". However, Jeremy Black and Anthony Green argue that despite the meaning of his name, he was not considered to be a youthful god.

The theonym Lugaludda (^{d}Lugal-ud-da), "lord of the demons," first attested in an Ur III offering list from Puzrish-Dagan, appears as Šulpae's alternate name in the god list An = Anum and in its Old Babylonian forerunner.

== Character ==
Šulpae's character is poorly known. The earliest sources do not contain theological information about his position in the pantheon and individual roles. The main sources of information for researchers is a hymn dedicated to him, which was composed in the Old Babylonian period. In addition to detailing his primary functions as an astral deity and a bringer of disease, it describes him fulfilling otherwise unknown roles, including those of a divine warrior and a deity of orchards and wild animals.

As an astral deity, Šulpae was associated with Jupiter, and especially with its heliacal rising. In Mesopotamian astronomy, his name was the most common designation for this planet, though it was also associated with Marduk. A single fragmentary list from the Old Babylonian period already places Šulpae next to the deity ^{d}UD.AL.TAR, also considered to be a divine representation of Jupiter, which might be tied to his own astral character. A commentary written by Nabû-mušēṣi states that "the Star of Marduk at its appearance is Šulpae; when it rises one double-hour, it is Sagmegar; when it stands in the middle of the sky, it is Nēberu." Another reference to this role is known from the Epic of Erra, in which the eponymous god during his rampage wants to "dim the brilliance of Šulpae and wrench the stars from heaven."

In the role of an agent of disease, Šulpae was commonly linked to bennu, possibly an unidentified "degenerative disease of the brain or spinal cord." It is possible that the reference to him being a "roving namtar demon" pertains to this function. Marten Stol argues that it is possible that the birth of a person afflicted by a disease associated with him was considered to be the result of the mother being impregnated through the influence of the planet he represented.

In the poem Death of Gilgamesh, Šulpae is listed alongside underworld gods, such as Ereshkigal, Ningishzida, Dimmeku and the ancestors of Enlil, but according to Dina Katz he did not belong to this category of deities himself. She points out Ninhursag, who also lacked such characteristics, is present in the same passage, and argues that their inclusion might have been the result on relying on a different composition, in which they also occur alongside Enlil's ancestors in a different context.

== Associations with other deities ==
Šulpae was the husband of Ninhursag, and could be described as her "beloved spouse." This connection is attested in sources pertaining to Kesh, such as the Kesh Temple Hymn. It is also known that this tradition was followed in Nippur. In the Nippur god list, Šulpae is followed by Ninhursag and eight other goddesses of similar character: Nin-dingir-re-e-ne, Ninmah, Nintur, Ninmena, Aruru, Dingirmaḫ, Mama (not to be confused with Mammitum) and Belet-ili, though it remains a matter of dispute if at this time they were understood as different names of the same goddess, or as individual though syncretised deities. Dina Katz assumes the view that he was the spouse of Ninhursag originated in Adab as a local tradition. However, Marcos Such-Gutiérrez points out that Šulpae is sparsely attested in sources from this city from the third millennium BCE, and suggests that initially Ashgi was Ninhursag's husband there, but later came to be viewed as her son instead, as attested in the god list An = Anum. Jeremy Black and Anthony Green assert that the tradition in which Šulpae was the spouse of Ninhursag contradicts her association with Enki in myths. However, according to Manfred Krebernik, it was widespread, while Enki only appears as Ninhursag's husband in the myth Enki and Ninhursag, where she is treated as identical to Damgalnunna, his usual spouse.

In addition to aforementioned Ashgi, deities regarded as the children of Šulpae and Ninhursag include Lisin, Panigingarra and Lillu, possibly identical with the first of these four.

Šulpae was also described as Enlil's brother-in-law, and in the hymn dedicated to him he is also his "lord of the banquet table," though this label is not attested elsewhere.

== Worship ==
Not much is known about the individual aspects of theworship of Šulpae, as religious texts which mention him are often offering lists. He appears in two Early Dynastic lists of deities from Fara, which imply that he already received offerings of fish in this period, but he is absent from contemporary texts from Abu Salabikh and Ebla. Most likely, by the middle of the third millennium BCE he became a prominent member of the local pantheon of Kesh. He is also present in a number of theophoric names from Adab from between the Early Dynastic and Ur III periods, such as Ur-Šulpae.

In the Early Dynastic text corpus from the state of Lagash, Šulpae only occurs in a single theophoric name, Ur-Šulpae. Later on, in the Ur III period, he received offerings in Girsu. A list of rations might indicate that he shared a temple in this city with Ninazu. In Nippur he was worshiped in the temple of Ninhursag, as already attested in Ur III sources, and later on, in the Old Babylonian period, in Ninurta's sanctuary Ešumeša as well. Further cities where he is attested in at this time include Larsa and Ur. Two seal inscriptions from Sippar mention him and Ninhursag as a pair as well. According to Ran Zadok, he also appears in theophoric names from Susa. However, Paul Delnero argues that his cult was overall not widespread in the Old Babylonian period.

In the Kassite period, Šulpae is attested in the inscriptions on a kudurru of Nazi-Maruttash. He is also invoked in two theophoric names identified in documents from Nippur. The Canonical Temple List, most likely composed in the late Kassite period, list a total of ten temples dedicated to him, though their ceremonial names and respective locations are not preserved. The names Eizzišutagga, "house of decorated walls," and Eḫursagga, "temple of the mountains," occur in another similar document, though no location is given for either of them. A lamentation mentions Etillara, "house which smites the steppe." A further temple the reading of whose name, Ešnam-UD, is partially uncertain, is also only known from a text belonging to this genre, though according to Andrew R. George it might also be present in a poorly preserved section of the Canonical Temple List.

Šulpae is attested in sources from the Seleucid period from Uruk as well, though he does not appear in any theophoric names or legal texts, and there is no indication that he was already worshiped there in the preceding Neo-Babylonian period. Julia Krul assumes that his introduction to the local pantheon was tied to his astral role, as a general rise of interest in astral deities can be observed locally in late sources.
