= Aruru (goddess) =

Mesopotamian goddess

- Goddess of vegetation
- Major cult center: Adab, Kesh, Irisaĝrig

Genealogy
- Siblings: Enlil

Aruru was a Mesopotamian goddess. The origin of her name is presently uncertain. While initially considered an independent deity associated with vegetation and portrayed in hymns as violent, she eventually came to be viewed as analogous to Ninhursag. Her name could also function as an epithet of goddesses such as Nisaba and Ezina-Kusu. She was often called the older sister of Enlil. Her cult centers most likely were the cities of Kesh, Adab and Irisaĝrig. She appears in a number of literary texts, some of which preserve information about her original character. She is also present in the Epic of Gilgamesh, which portrays her as the creator of Enkidu.

== Name and character ==
The etymology of the theonym Aruru (^{d}A-ru-ru, 𒀭𒀀𒊒𒊒) is considered either uncertain or unknown. A connection with Sumerian a-ru or a-ri, which can be translated as "the one who lets the seed flow," has been deemed implausible by Manfred Krebernik, as this term is only used in this sense to refer to men. Thorkild Jacobsen initially suggested the explanation "the germ loosener," though he eventually abandoned it in favor of translating the name as "outpour of water," or implicitly "outpour of amniotic fluid," which is now considered a mistranslation, as the homophone arūru means "outlet of a canal," not "outflow."

Gonzalo Rubio states that like other Mesopotamian theonyms of similar structure, such as Zababa, Alala, Belili, Bunene or Kubaba, Aruru's name likely did not originate in Sumerian or any of the Semitic languages, though he also notes theories classifying them as examples of words from a hypothetical substrate language referred to as "proto-Euphratean" in old scholarship are now viewed critically in Assyriology. Jeremy Black stated that a "pre-Sumerian" origin of Aruru's name cannot be ruled out, though caution is necessary, as she is not attested before the Third Dynasty of Ur.

It has been suggested that the theonyms ^{d}a.ru, attested in a god list from Abu Salabikh, and ^{d}E_{4}-ru_{6}, referring to Sarpanit, might be etymologically related to Aruru's name.

Julia M. Asher-Greve states that a variant form of the name prefixed with the sign nin, "mistress," is also attested, which according to her is analogous to the interchange between the forms Azimua and Nin-Azimua. However, according to Antoine Cavigneaux and Manfred Krebernik, in the god list An = Anum the name Nin-Aruru designates a minor goddess from the court of Ninhursag, designated as one of her six gud-balaĝ, literally "bull lyres." Krebernik treats her as a separate servant deity.

The oldest known sources associate Aruru with vegetation, but do not portray her as a goddess of birth or as a creator deity. Specific plants mentioned in compositions dedicated to her include poplar, date palm, cedar, Prosopis and the unidentified teme and marmaḫ. She was also portrayed as a powerful and violent deity whose behavior was poetically compared to that of a bull or a viper. While she could be referred to as ama, according to Jeremy Black despite its literal meaning this term does not necessarily denote her as a mother, and can also be translated as "venerable woman" or simply "female." Julia M. Asher-Greve, in her analysis of the use of epithets "mother" and "father" to refer to Mesopotamian deities, states that they also could be used to describe to a given deity's position of authority. Black concluded that it would be inaccurate to refer to Aruru understood as a distinct deity as a mother goddess, as the only sources which describe her directly as a mother of mankind or other gods also syncretise her with other goddesses.

== Associations with other deities ==
While Aruru was originally a distinct deity, she eventually came to be conflated with various goddesses of birth who at some point became interchangeable with each other. However, Joan Goodnick Westenholz concluded that at least in Sumerian sources, Aruru never came to be fully conflated with any of them, and compares her case to that of Ninmena. Jeremy Black noted that while syncretism is impossible to deny, known sources do preserve information which seemingly pertains to originally individual cults of the goddesses from this category, including Aruru. He proposes that she was initially a minor goddess from the pantheon of Adab and Kesh whose cult was eventually subsumed under Ninhursag's, leading to conflation of the two and to the perception of Aruru herself as a goddess of birth. Aruru's name is used interchangeably with Ninhursag's in one of the Temple Hymns. It is presumed that in this case, it is meant to reflect that the latter occupied a position of authority in the pantheon. In the Old Babylonian Nippur god list, Aruru is one of the nine goddesses of birth listed after Šulpae, the husband of Ninhursag. It is not certain if at this point in time they were understood as names of one goddess, or as closely affiliated deities.

In a hymn to Nisaba, this goddess is referred to as the "Aruru of the land," which according to Westenholz is meant to highlight her high status, rather than point at a connection to birth. In the earliest copies, dated to the Ur III period, the name is written as a-ru_{12}-ru_{12}, without the dingir sign, the divine determinative used to designate theonyms, though the standard writing, with a dingir, is employed in the later Old Babylonian copies. It has been interpreted as an appellative. In other contexts where this theonym occurs as an epithet of this goddess, or of Ezina-Kusu, it most likely reflects their respective roles as vegetation deities,

Aruru was regarded as the older sister of Enlil. She is described this way in many of the compositions which portray her as a violent vegetation deity. She is also similarly referred to as a member of Enlil's family in Lugal-e, though she is portrayed as a goddess of birth in this text.

In a hymn, a minor god named Baraguleĝara is described as a member of Aruru's entourage residing in Kesh, though this reference is unique, and he is otherwise absent from literary texts. In god lists he appears as one of the sons of the "syncretised birth goddess," grouped with Panigingarra and his spouse Ninpanigingarra.

A text known as Archive of Mystic Heptads labels Aruru as the "Bēlet-ilī of the city of Sippar-Aruru" in an enumeration of seven goddesses of similar character, who are all stated to be subordinate to Zarpanit, which reflects an attempt at assigning the position of other goddesses to her.

== Worship ==
The oldest certain evidence for the worship of Aruru is a theophoric name from the Ur III period, Ur-Aruru, found in a text from Ur. In the Lament for Eridu, Aruru's city is Irisaĝrig (Akkadian Āl-šarrāki), which was most likely located in the proximity of Adab, further upstream. However, according to Jeremy Black no early texts from Adab itself known as of 2005 made any reference to offerings to her. In the Isin-Larsa and Old Babylonian periods, Aruru is attested in Adab and Kesh. Based on the presence of the closely associated god Baraguleĝara in the pantheon of Larsa Black suggested Aruru might have been worshiped in this city as well during the reign of Rim-Sîn I.

The toponym Sippar-Yahrurum, known from Old Babylonian sources, was later reinterpreted as Sippar-Aruru through a folk etymology. She is associated with this location in the so-called Archive of Mystic Heptads, which lists various goddesses at the time of its composition associated with birth and their respective cult centers. However, Black did not list it among the cities where she might have actually been originally worshiped as a distinct deity.

== Mythology ==
A number of compositions focused on Aruru treated as a distinct goddess are known, though all of them are written in Emesal, a dialect of Sumerian, which makes them difficult to translate and interpret. Two come from Larsa, three or four from Kish, examples are known from Nippur as well. One of them revolves around Ninmah unsuccessfully trying to calm Aruru. A further composition states that she had a garden, and refers to her as the "mother of dates" (ama zu_{2}-lum-ma-ke_{4}) and "mother of apples" (ama ^{ĝiš}ḫašḫur-ra-ke_{4}). Yet another portrays her as a powerful, violent deity and apparently states that she killed an anonymous shepherd, and destroyed a sheepfold and a cattle pen.

Aruru is also present in the myth Enlil and Sud. When Nisaba agrees to let Enlil marry her daughter Sud, she declares that his sister Aruru should take her to his household. Her role is described by Nisaba with the Sumerian term e-ri-ib, which according to Miguel Civil refers to the sister of a son-in-law, who apparently played a role in marriage rites of her brother. Aruru subsequently helps Sud prepare for her wedding, and takes her to the Ekur, where Enlil waits for her.

A fragmentary Middle Assyrian myth which has been compared to the Labbu narrative involves Aruru being summoned to reveal which of the gods is the most suitable for the task of defeating a monstrous serpent, with Nergal eventually nominated for the task.

One of the two known hymns to Ninimma mentions Aruru, according to Christopher Metcalf in this context described as a birth goddess, and portrays the deity it was dedicated to as her assistant.

In the standard version of the Epic of Gilgamesh, Aruru is responsible for the creation of the wild man Enkidu from a lump of clay. Nathan Wasserman notes that the account of his creation is "impersonal," and there is no indication she was viewed as his mother. According to Jeremy Black, this composition postdates the texts portraying Aruru as a distinct deity by around a thousand years, and in this context she is only a "generic mother goddess."
