= Kus (god) =

Kus is a god of herdsmen in Sumerian, Babylonian, and Akkadian mythology. He is identified in the Theogony of Dunnu.

== See also ==
- Qos (deity)
