= Ashgi =

Mesopotamian god

- Warrior god
- Major cult center: Adab, Kesh, Irisaĝrig

Genealogy
- Parents: Ninhursag and Šulpae
- Siblings: Panigingarra, Egime
- Spouse: Gishhuranki

Ashgi (𒀭𒋓𒄄 Ašgi) was a Mesopotamian god associated with Adab and Kesh. While he was originally the tutelary deity of the former of these two cities, he was eventually replaced in this role by his mother Ninhursag, locally known under the name Digirmah. He is mostly attested in sources from before the Old Babylonian period.

== Character ==
In the Kesh temple hymn, Ashgi is characterized as a warrior god. He was also the tutelary god of Adab.

While Thorkild Jacobsen classified Ashgi as one of the gods associated with herding, the view that Mesopotamian gods can be grouped based on "the ecological potential of their respective habitats" has been criticized by Wilfred G. Lambert, who characterized it as creating "more system than really existed." Frans Wiggermann notes that in some cases such associations in cases where they are actually attested, like the connection between the moon god Nanna and cow herding, might at best represent secondary developments.

== Connections with other deities ==
It is unclear if Ashgi was initially the spouse or the son of the goddess Nintu, analogous to Ninhursag. In later periods he was viewed as her son, and her husband Šulpae is identified as his father in the god list An = Anum. Marcos Such-Gutiérrez notes that the latter deity is very sparsely attested in documents from Adab.

In the same god list Ashgi's wife is the goddess Gishhuranki. Daniel Schwemer proposes an identification between Gishhuranki and Muhuranki, in one composition used as an alternate name of Shala, the wife of the weather god Adad. He notes that while Ashgi and Adad's Sumerian counterpart Ishkur occur close to each other in offering lists, no solid conclusions can be drawn from presently available data.

While no deity is identified as Ashgi's sukkal in the god list An = Anum, a deity named Shatarnunta-e is labeled as his "servant" (Sumerian: gu_{4}-dúb). Additionally, one of his courtiers is identified as the sukkal of his wife, though only a part of their name, ^{d}Dam-u_{5}-(...) is preserved.

The Weidner god list places Ashgi next to another of Ninhursag's sons, Panigingarra, who was also associated with him in other sources, and who in An = Anum is also the son of Šulpae.

== Worship ==
Ashgi is already mentioned in Early Dynastic sources from Fara. He was worshiped in Adab and Kesh. Additionally, a village named Ashgi-pada existed near the first of these cities. Evidence is also available from a city closely connected to Kesh, Irisaĝrig.

A temple of Ashgi existed in Adab. A partially preserved name, E-ugim(...), "house like a storm (...)," is known from temple lists, but according to Andrew R. George it is uncertain if it refers to a house of worship located in Adab or in Kesh. A house of worship dedicated to him was also located in Irisaĝrig.

In texts from Adab, Ashgi is one of the three deities most commonly attested in theophoric names, next to Enlil and Utu. He also appears in greeting formulas in letters alongside his mother, usually under the name Digirmah, an epithet meaning "exalted deity." The name Ninhursag is used less often in such sources. In offering lists, Ashgi is typically followed by Inanna and Ishkur.

While Ashgi was one of the main gods of Adab in the Early Dynastic and Sargonic periods, outside of god lists preserving a conservative view of the local pantheons he is sparsely attested from the Old Babylonian period onward. He was replaced in the role of the city deity by Ninhursag, whose cult was transferred to Adab from Kesh in the Sargonic period.

== Mythology ==
According to Dina Katz, Lulil (Sumerian: "man-spirit") from the lament Lulil and his sister (dated to the Isin-Larsa period) can be identified with Ashgi. Lulil is described as a son of Ninhursag and Šulpae and as a deity of Kesh and Adab. His sister mentioned in the title of this composition was the goddess Egime. The text appears to contain a description of a funerary ritual. Egime is instructed to pour water into a libation pipe, an implement known to be associated with graves, as evidenced by burials from Ur and the designation of Enegi, cult center of the netherworld god Ninazu, as the "great offering pipe of the netherworld." The goal ritual libations performed using the pip[es was guaranteeing the well being of the dead in the netherworld.

Manfred Krebernik proposes that the portrayal of Lulil is a dying god was the result of confusion between him and the similarly named god Lulal, associated with Inanna.
