= Panigingarra =

Mesopotamian god

Paniĝinĝarra (or Paniĝara) was a Mesopotamian god worshiped in Adab. His name could be contracted, and as a result in Old Babylonian documents the writing ^{d}Pa-an-ni-gá-ra can be found.

An inscription from the reign of Meli-Shipak refers to him as EN ku-dur-ri, "lord of kudurru."

A temple dedicated to him whose name is not fully preserved, Eursag[...], existed in Adab. It might be the same temple of this god which is mentioned in an inscription of Rim-Sîn I of Larsa. One more temple seemingly bore the name Emeteursag (Sumerian: "house worthy of a hero"), better known as the name of a site associated with Zababa located in Kish. Yet another, Enigurru ("house clad in terror") shared its name with a temple of Ishtar in her guise of "queen of Nippur." Two further temples, Eutul ("house of the herd") and another whose name is not preserved are also known. Manfred Krebernik, following the study of Andrew R. George, assumes that all of them were located in Adab.

In the god list An = Anum Paniĝinĝarra appears as a son of Ninhursag and her husband Šulpae. The earlier Weidner god list places him next to another of Ninhursag's sons, Ashgi, who was also associated with him in other sources. Paniĝinĝarra could also appear alongside his mother, for example in greeting formulas in letters. In late sources he could be equated with Ninurta, similar to Pabilsaĝ. Wilfred G. Lambert goes as far as referring to him as a "form of Ninurta."

A few works of Mesopotamian literature refer to Paniĝinĝarra. The humorous tale "Three ox drivers from Adab" describes him as "their sage, the scholar, the god of Adab" and as a "clerk" in what might be a parody of court proceedings. He is also mentioned in passing in the poorly preserved myth Urash and Marduk.
