= Dynasty of Dunnum =

Ancient Mesopotamian mythical tale

Fertile Crescent myth series
Mark of the Palm
Mesopotamian
Levantine
Arabian
Mesopotamia
Primordial beings
The great gods
Demigods & heroes
Spirits & monsters
Tales from Babylon
7 Gods who Decree
4 primary: Anu; Enlil; Ki; Enki	3 sky: Ishtar; Sin; Sama

The Dynasty of Dunnum, sometimes called the Theogony of Dunnum or Dunnu or the Harab Myth, is an ancient Mesopotamian mythical tale of successive generations of gods who take power through parricide and live incestuously with their mothers and/or sisters, until, according to a reconstruction of the broken text, more acceptable behavior prevailed with the last generation of gods, Enlil and his twin sons Nušku and Ninurta, who share rule amicably. It is extant in a sole-surviving late Babylonian copy excavated from the site of the ancient city of Sippar by Hormuzd Rassam in the 19th century.

== Synopsis ==
It chronicles the conflict of generations of the gods who represent aspects of fertility, agriculture and the seasonal cycle: heaven, earth, sea, river, plough, wild and domesticated animals, herdsman, pasture, fruit-tree and vine.

It begins, according to a restoration:

In the beginning, [Harab married earth.] Family and lord[ship he founded. Saying: "A]rable land we will carve out (of) the ploughed land of the country. [With the p]loughing of their harbu-ploughs they cause the creation of the sea. [The lands ploughed with the mayaru-pl]ow by themselves gave birth to Sumuqan. His str[onghold,] Dunnu, the eternal city, they created, both of them.

— Translated by William W. Hallo, The world's oldest literature: studies in Sumerian belles-lettres

Then Sumuqan kills his father Harab (plough), marries his mother Ki (earth) and his sister and the cycle of carnage begins. The city of Dunnum was a synonymous toponym, with many places so named, such as one in the vicinity of Isin and another lying of the right bank of the Euphrates in what is now northern Syria. A dunnu is a fortified settlement, but the word can also be translated as strength or violence.

== Influence ==
The tale spread across to Phoenicia and over the Aegean Sea, where its influence can be felt in the Ugarit myth Ba’al and Yam from the Ba’al cycle (ca. 1600-1200 BC), the Hittite myth Song of Kumarbi (14th or 13th century BC) and the Greek poet Hesiod’s Theogony (ca. 800-700 BC).
