= Šumugan =

Mesopotamian and Syrian god

Šumugan, Šamagan, Šumuqan or Šakkan (𒀭𒄊) was a god worshipped in Mesopotamia and ancient Syria. He was associated with animals.

== Character ==
Šumugan was a shepherd god. He was associated with various quadrupeds, especially donkeys or alternatively wild sheep. In Ebla he was associated with mules. In literary texts he was also tasked with caring for their habitat and plants growing there. In some texts his epithet is "shepherd of everything." Other known epithets include "god of wool," "god of herd animals," "god of grass-eating animals" and "god of watering places." He was regarded as responsible for prosperity and agricultural fertility, often in connection with grain deities (such as Ezina) and beer deities (such as Ninkasi). The name could also be metaphorically applied to a stallion of a herd.

Due to the association between the steppe, where he was believed to dwell, and the netherworld, he sometimes appears in connection with the latter. Texts attesting this connection include the poem Death of Gilgamesh and a number of incantations.

His main attribute was a ram-headed crook. Another of his attributes was likely a fleece. The number 14 was regarded as connected to him, though it was also associated with Nergal.

== Worship ==
Šumugan's cult had a limited scope in Mesopotamia, one exception being Assur in the Iron Age. He was worshiped there in the Urmashtur, "pen of lions and wild beasts," alongside the god Urmah ("lion"). In earlier periods he is attested in documents from Kish, Ur, Lagash and Fara.

Under the name Šamagan he was worshiped west of Mesopotamia, for example in Ebla. A special type of sacrifice to him was carried out by the overseers of mules. His western cult center in the Ebla period was seemingly the settlement ME.NE, which belonged to the kingdom of Nagar. A king of Ibubu, a city east of Harran, bearing the theophoric name Ilam-Šamagan is also known from a document according to which he swore allegiance to Ebla in the temple of the city god Kura. Other people bearing similar names known from Eblaite documents include Iku-Šamagan, a king of Mari; Irmi-Šamagan, son of a king of Irrite; and Puzur-Šamagan, possibly a chief of Ib'al. Another western city where the cult of Šamagan flourished was Nabada.

Based on the fact that the worship of Šamagan was widespread in Syrian polities such as Nagar and Mari, Alfonso Archi proposes that he initially developed in the same area, possibly among speakers of "proto-Akkadian" language who introduced him to southern Mesopotamia. According to the god list Anu ša amēli, Šamagan is equal to Sharshar, the god of the Sutean nomads.

== Associations with other deities ==
Šumugan's wife was Ellamesi, regarded as the goddess of wool, though Frans Wiggermann notes that unlike another agricultural god, Dumuzi, he was generally not portrayed in romantic context. He was sometimes associated with Utu/Shamash, either as his son (for example in the god list An = Anum) or as a courtier. According to a seal inscription from Lagash, his sukkal (attendant deity) was Edinmugi (Sumerian: "he secured the plains").

In the god list An=Anu ša amēli multiple gods are described as aspects of Šumugan, including Martu and Šaršar, described as "Šumugan of the Suteans."

In the Epic of Gilgamesh, the not yet civilized Enkidu is at one point described as "clothed (...) like Šakkan."

In Hittite sources the logographic writing SUMUQAN (or GÌR) designates the deity Miyatanzipa.
