= Jeremy Black (Assyriologist) =

British historian and archaeologist of Assyria (1951–2004)

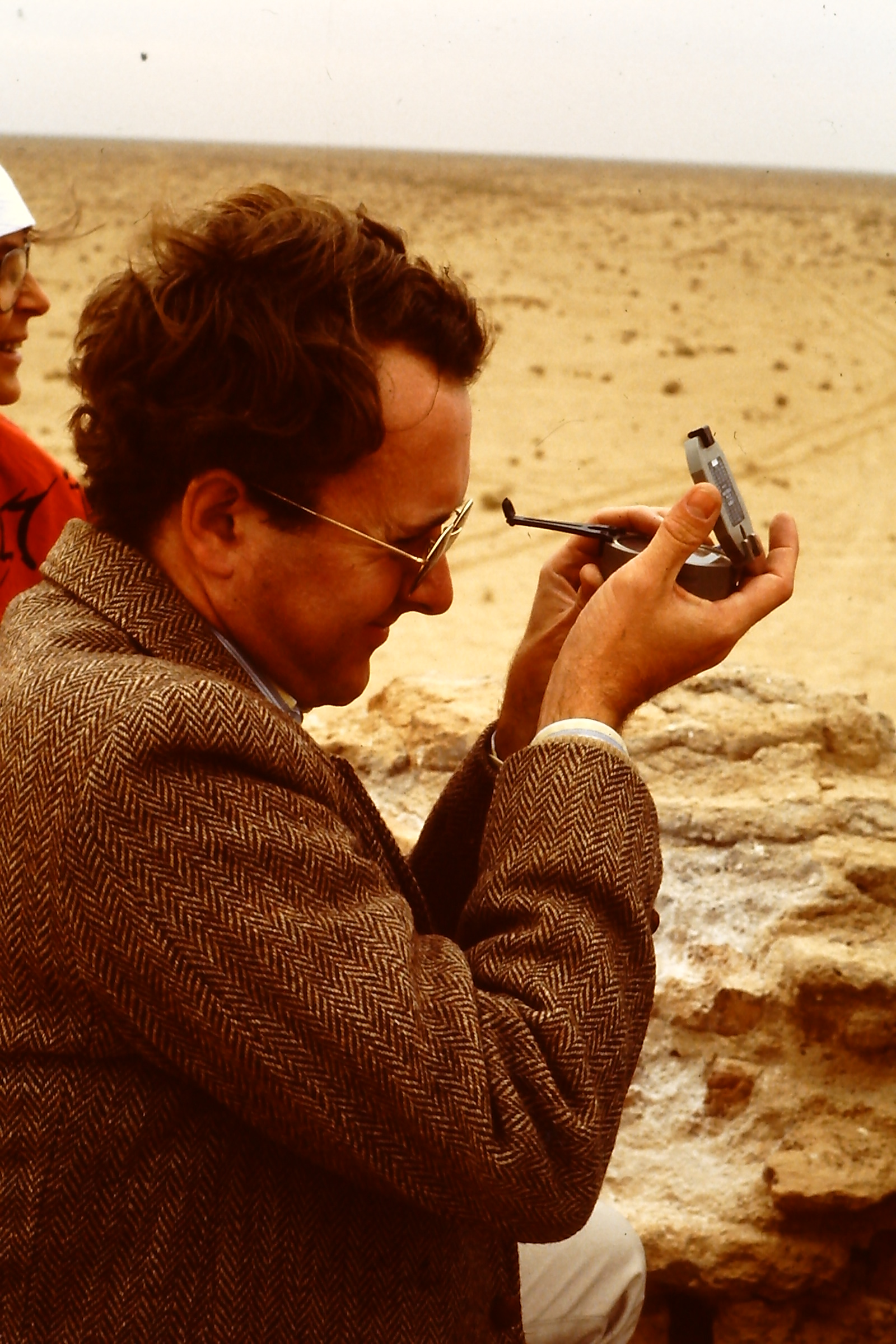
- Black as Director of BAEI visiting the early Islamic hunting lodge of Khan 'Atshan in the Iraqi western desert, 1988
- Born: 1 September 1951; Isleworth, Middlesex, England
- Died: 28 April 2004 (aged 52); Oxford, Oxfordshire, England
- Education: University of Oxford
- Known for: Electronic Text Corpus of Sumerian Literature
- Spouse: Ellen McAdam (divorced)
- Scientific career
- Doctoral advisors: Edmond Sollberger; Oliver Gurney

Jeremy Allen Black (1 September 1951 – 28 April 2004) was a British assyriologist and sumerologist, founder of the online Electronic Text Corpus of Sumerian Literature.

== Early life ==
Black was born in Isleworth, Middlesex, England, and was brought up in Buckinghamshire, England. He was the only son of tea-taster Dudley A. Black and his wife Joan M. née Denton (1913–1957). At age two, he was isolated for a year in hospital with polio, then, at age five, his mother died.

== Education ==
After his attendance at Slough Grammar School for Boys, in 1969 Black went to Worcester College, Oxford, as Exhibitioner in Classics. At Oxford, he became interested in the ancient languages and cultures of Mesopotamia, and, after qualifying, changed his studies to Sumerian and Akkadian under Professor Oliver Gurney. His (still unpublished) BA dissertation was entitled "A History of Nippur, from the Earliest Times to the End of the Kassite Period": this work was utilised in the very beginning of S.W. Cole's book Nippur in Late Assyrian Times, ca. 745-612 B.C., 1996, where it is described as the "only systematic treatment of Nippur's early history". In 1975 Black attained his BPhil in Cuneiform Studies.

For postgraduate studies, partly supervised by Edmond Sollberger of the British Museum, and with the continuing guidance of Gurney at Oxford, Black wrote his DPhil dissertation on "Ancient Babylonian Grammatical Theory", submitted in 1980 and later published under the title Sumerian Grammar in Babylonian Theory, Rome 1984, 2nd edition 1991. Andrew George has described it as "the only book-length examination of the linguistic thinking that underpinned the Babylonians' understanding of Sumerian".

While completing his DPhil dissertation, Black took a position with St Catherine's Foundation, Cumberland Lodge in Windsor Great Park. In 1981, however, he was enabled to return full-time to the field of Assyriology by his appointment to a Research Associate post at the Oriental Institute of the University of Chicago to work on the Chicago Assyrian Dictionary Project (see acknowledgement of his contribution on the title pages of volumes 17/Š [1989–1992] and 14/R [1999]).

== Career ==
In 1982, Black took up the post of assistant director of the British Archaeological Expedition to Iraq, the Baghdad wing of the British School of Archaeology in Iraq, succeeding Michael Roaf, who had been elevated to the directorship. Following the resignation of Roaf in late 1985, Black was appointed Director, which post he held until early 1988.

In Iraq, Black served as epigrapher on a number of archaeological expeditions, and in Baghdad carried out research in the Iraq Museum, where he worked especially on the tablets (cuneiform documents) discovered in the earlier major British excavations at Ur and Nimrud; the latter were published in J.A. Black and Donald Wiseman, Cuneiform Tablets from Nimrud, 4: Literary Texts from the Temple of Nabû, London 1996. Black also collaborated on Assyriological works with Iraqi scholars, notably with Farouk Al-Rawi, and with other colleagues from the days in Baghdad: the book Gods, Demons and Symbols of Ancient Mesopotamia: An Illustrated Dictionary (co-authored with Anthony Green, illustrated by Tessa Rickards, London and Austin 1992, 2nd edition 1998) grew out of such an association. Also in Iraq, Black met and married the British archaeologist Ellen McAdam (later divorced).

Benefitting from the recommendations of the 1986 Parker Report into Asian and African Studies in Universities in the UK, in 1988 Oxford University was able to re-establish a full-time lectureship in Assyriology (absent since the retirement of Gurney in 1978). The new post, known as University Lecturer in Akkadian, was awarded to Black, who was also elected a Fellow of Wolfson College.

Back in Oxford – apart from periods devoted to full administrative duties, first as Senior Proctor of the university, 1995–1996, then as chairman of the board of the Faculty of Oriental Studies, 1999–2001 – Black was free to develop his studies in Sumerian literature, literary criticism and philology. Most notable was the publication of his Reading Sumerian Poetry, Oxford 1988. In the assessment of A.R. George, this book "displays ... a real sensitivity to Sumerian imagery". Black also collaborated with Andrew R. George and J. Nicholas Postgate on A Concise Dictionary of Akkadian, 1999 (reprinted 2000). He participated in other scholarly projects, such as those of the international "Sumerian Grammar Group" and the Gröningen-based "Mesopotamian Literature Group".

From 1997, with initial funding from the Leverhulme Trust, and later from the Arts and Humanities Research Board, Black founded and administered what may well come to be considered his greatest legacy, the Internet-based "Electronic Text Corpus of Sumerian Literature". Work by the project team continued after Black's death, although active funding was ended in mid-2006.

== Personal life ==
Black was an enthusiastic amateur musician who sang bass with the Cathedral Singers of Christ Church, Oxford, and with the Northamptonshire-based period music ensemble Fiori Musicali.

== Death ==
Black died in 2004 at Oxford. The Jeremy Allen Black Trust for Assyriology, a fund to support young Assyriologists, was established by the Faculty of Oriental Studies at Oxford University in his memory. At Upton Court Grammar School, a memorial prize for Languages and Classics is given each year in his memory.
