= Ara (goddess) =

Mesopotamian goddess

- Sukkalmaḫ of Enki
- Major cult center: Malgium

Ara (Sumerian: ^{d}ŠA) was a Mesopotamian goddess regarded as a servant of the god Enki. While in the past it was often assumed this theonym was only an alternate name for Isimud, today the two are regarded as distinct deities who eventually came to be conflated with each other. Ara is attested in sources such as god lists (including the Weidner god list and An = Anum), incantations and a curse formula from Malgium.

== Name ==
The theonym Ara was written in cuneiform logographically as ^{d}ŠA. ^{d}PAP.SIG_{7}.NIMGIR, known from the Old Babylonian An = Anum forerunner, might be an additional variant.

In the past many Assyriologists assumed Ara was a secondary name of Isimud, though Wilfred G. Lambert maintained a cautious approach and stated that it cannot be established whether the two were identical or if they represented two different traditions about the identity of a deity fulfilling the same function in the pantheon. In a recent publication Julia Krul states that based on evidence available as of 2018, it can be assumed they were two deities who eventually came to be conflated with each other, but were originally separate, and additionally that Ara's gender was different from Isimud's, as according to Old Babylonian Emesal texts the name referred to goddess, rather than a god.

== Associations with other deities ==
Ara is well attested as a servant of Ea (Enki). In the god list An = Anum she is referred to as his sukkalmaḫ (sukkal-maḫ ^{d}En-ki-ga-ke_{4}). This title could be applied to various divine "viziers" (sukkal), though there is no evidence that it indicated superior status to other servant deities, and its use was most likely meant to highlight the high position of a given deity's master in the pantheon. A text from Malgium also refers to Ara as a sukkalmaḫ, but according to Raphael Kutscher in this case the use of this title might have been the result of Elamite cultural influence. In an exorcism text referred to as Gattung III, Ara is addressed as the "vizier of the apsu" (sukkal ab-zu-a).

Despite the difference in gender, from the Old Babylonian period onward Ara could be equated with Isimud, which according to Julia Krul might have been related to the latter's characteristic two-faced appearance or to contemporary syncretic processes involving Ninshubur. The latter deity, while originally female, came to be conflated with male deities of analogous character, Ilabrat and Papsukkal, and eventually lost her individual character as a result.

== Attestations ==
In the Nippur god list, Ara appears as the twenty fifth of the deities listed, between ^{d}Am-an-ki and Damgalnuna. In the Weidner god list she is chiefly attested in copies postdating the Old Babylonian period, though a possible exception is known from Nippur, as a fragmentary text which might be a variant of this composition records the sequence Damgalnuna, Damkina, Ara, Id. In An = Anum she occurs directly before Isimud (tablet II, line 102).

In the incantation series Šurpu, Ara appears after Lugalabzu, a title of Ea, and before Ḫasīsu, another deity from his circle. Gattung III lists her in a sequence of deities belonging to the household of Ea after his mother Namma and his daughter Nanshe, and before Laḫama-abzu, another divine servant. A different fragmentary incantation lists Ara, Gibil and Ninagal as the deities responsible for the creation of the "Great Copper", an agent of purification possibly regarded as a non-anthropomorphic deity or a being comparable to a genius. While the other two gods respectively melt and work the metal used to create this entity, Ara's task is to give it the right appearance.

A curse formula from Old Babylonian Malgium invokes Ara alongside Ea and Damkina.
