= Ninshubur =

Mesopotamian messenger deity

Ninshubur 𒀭𒎏𒋚
- Sukkal of Inanna, An and the divine assembly
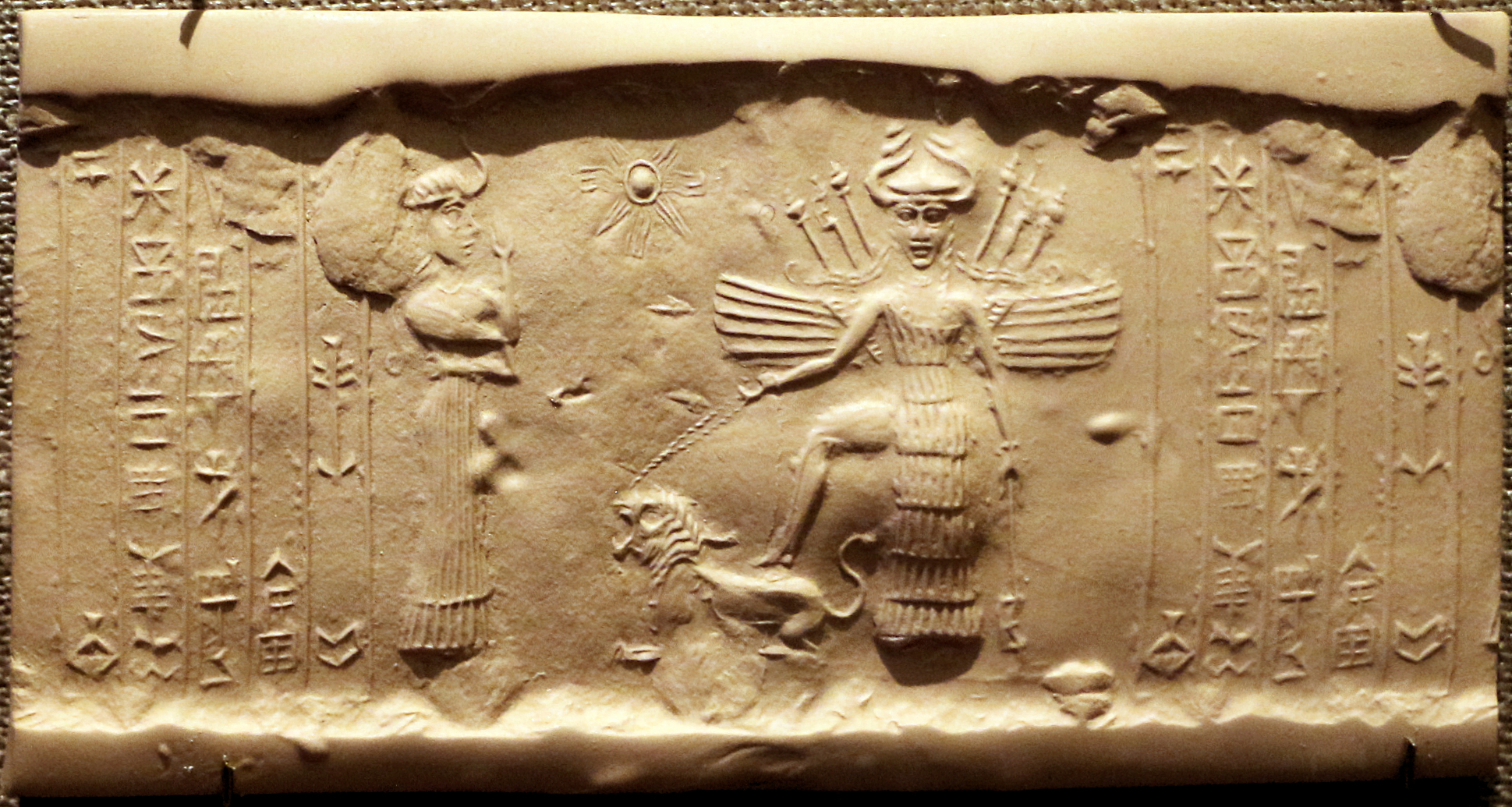
- Sargonic cylinder seal depicting Inanna resting her foot on the back of a lion while Ninshubur stands in front of her paying obeisance, c. 2334-2154 BCE
- Major cult center: Akkil, Uruk, Girsu
- Symbol: staff

Genealogy
- Spouse: usually none, but rarely Nergal

Equivalents
- Akkadian: Ilabrat
- Seleucid Uruk: Papsukkal

Ninshubur (𒀭𒎏𒋚; Ninšubur, "Lady of Subartu" or "Lady of servants"), also spelled Ninšubura, was a Mesopotamian goddess regarded as the sukkal (divine attendant) of the goddess Inanna. While it is agreed that in this context Ninshubur was regarded as female, in other cases the deity was considered male, possibly due to syncretism with other divine messengers, such as Ilabrat. No certain information about her genealogy is present in any known sources, and she was typically regarded as unmarried. As a sukkal, she functioned both as a messenger deity and as an intercessor between other members of the pantheon and human petitioners.

Due to the belief that she could intercede with higher ranking deities, Ninshubur was popular in everyday religion, and many theophoric names invoking her and other references to personal worship are known. Her original cult center was Akkil, but in the Early Dynastic Period she was already worshiped in nearby Uruk. She was also introduced to the pantheon of the state of Lagash, where her cult center was Girsu. Multiple kings of this area regarded her as their personal deity. In the Ur III period she was also introduced to Ur. Further cities where Ninshubur was worshiped include Adab, Nippur, Malgium, and more.

In myths, Ninshubur is portrayed as a companion of Inanna and helps her during various exploits. In Inanna's Descent to the Netherworld, she is responsible for securing Inanna's return by pleading with Enlil, Nanna and Enki. After being resurrected, Inanna protects her from the galla demons sent to find someone to replace her in the land of the dead. Ninshubur's mourning is contrasted with Dumuzi's attitude which leads to his death in this composition. In Inanna and Enki, Ninshubur helps Inanna escape from Enki's servants after theft of the me.

== Names ==
=== Ninshubur ===
Frans Wiggermann translates Ninshubur's name as "Lady of Subartu". or alternatively "Lady of servants" (or "Lady of Subarian servants") based on another meaning of the second element, šubur, "servant," and in reference to her role as a benevolent intercessory deity. Earlier translations, for example Wilfred G. Lambert's from 1976, which relied on two lexical lists from the first millennium BCE explaining it as bel erseti - "lord of the earth" or "lord of the underworld" - are regarded as erroneous, as no other sources explain the meaning of šubur as erseti. It is possible this uncommon understanding was based on a local tradition associating Ninshubur with Nergal.

The Sumerian term Shubur or Subir (Subartu) originally designated areas north of Mesopotamia. Both in ancient documents and in past scholarship the terms "Subartu" and "Subarians" usually refer to Hurrians. (Note: Beate Pongratz-Leisten notes that Hurrians were never regarded as outsiders in Mesopotamian sources, unlike other neighboring groups such as the Gutians, most likely due to their culture also having an urban character. According to Tonia Sharlach, the inhabitants of Subartu were viewed as "neighbors whose language (and perhaps culture) were worthy of closer knowledge.") Ninshubur is described as a resident of the "mountain-lands of Subartu (kur šubur)" brought to Mesopotamia by Utu in the Early Dynastic UD.GAL.NUN text CUT 4, a narrative dealing with the sun god traveling to various mountainous areas to bring deities or animals from them. It is possible that echoes of Ninshubur's association with Subartu survived as late as in the Neo-Assyrian period in texts pertaining to Papsukkal.

While ^{d}nin-šubur was the standard writing of Ninshubur's name in cuneiform, a variant with a genitive suffix (-ak) is attested in a variety of sources as well, including personal names from the Ur III period and Old Babylonian literary texts. Wiggermann additionally argues that sometimes the name was rendered simply as Shubur, but this assumption is not universally accepted. Additionally, two forms of Ninshubur's name in the Emesal dialect are known, Gashanshubur, referring to the female form of this deity, and Umunshubur, referring to the male one, though the latter is only known from a single source.

=== Ninakkil ===
Ninakkil, "lady and Akkil", was a title applied to Ninshubur as the tutelary goddess of Akkil. Frans Wiggermann assumes that it already occurs in the Zame Hymns, based on the possible identification of the teoponym AB.KID.KID as Akkil and its namesake tutelary deity as Ninakkil. The thirty ninth (out of seventy) hymn is dedicated to her. This identification is also supported by Joan Goodnick Westenholz. Manfred Krebernik and Jan Lisman in their commentary of this text argue that it cannot be established with certainty that AB.KID.KID and its deity ^{d}NIN.AB.KID.KID are necessarily Akkil and Ninakkil, respectively, as usually assumed based on the later convention of writing the toponym Akkil as AB.KID, though they do not rule out this possibility. They ultimately conclude that ^{d}NIN.AB.KID.KID must have been at least analogous to Ninshubur as both deities are described fulfilling the same role in relation to Inanna.

=== Nin-ŠUBUR.AL ===
The theonym Nin-ŠUBUR.AL might be either an alternate form of Ninshubur's name or a separate, though similarly named, deity. Manfred Krebernik and Jan Lisman suggest reading this name as Ninšuburmaḫ. In the Zame Hymns the sixty fourth hymn is dedicated to this deity, with the corresponding cult center being GIN_{2}.U_{9}.ŠA_{3}.GA (reading uncertain). The same deity is also attested in the Early Dynastic god list from Fara, between two separate entries for Ninshubur, but is absent from an analogous text from Abu Salabikh, where only the two Ninshuburs occur. Ultimately the identity of this deity remains uncertain.

=== Sukkalanna ===
Sukkalanna, "heavenly vizier", is attested as a further alternate name of Ninshubur. It is her most common epithet, and additionally occurs as a theophoric element in names from the Ur III period. From the Old Babylonian period onwards, it starts to alternate with sukkal-zi-Eanna, which according to Frans Wiggermann likely indicates that the element anna was understood as the abstract noun "heaven" and not as a reference to the god Anu.

=== Other names ===
A total of fourteen names and titles of Ninshubur are listed in the god list An = Anum (tablet I, lines 31-44). In addition to the primary name they include Kakka, Meninnuanna ("fifty ordinances of heaven"), Iggalla ("big door", originally a distinct deity (Note: Evidence for the worship of Iggalla is available from Old Babylonian Uruk, where according to seal inscriptions he was considered the purification specialist (išib) of Eanna.)), Kabaninukurru ("whose promise cannot be changed"), Anzaggalla ("seat of honor"), Anšarkin ("who directs the totality of heaven"), Anšargia ("who exercises authority over the totality of heaven"), Enḫun ("appeasing lord"), ^{d}en-ḫun-ga_{2}-ŠE_{3} ("lord involved in appeasing"), ^{d}ŠUBUR-ḫa-mun and Sagilla ("who exalts"). Since all of the names are provided with complex Sumerian explanations, Ryan D. Winters proposes that this section might have been incorporated into An = Anum from another source. The Old Babylonian forerunner of An = Anum only lists two names of Ninshubur, Ninshubur and ^{d}ḫa-mun-ŠUBUR.

Additional names of Ninshubur can be found in An = Anum ša amēli (lines 61-69), an explanatory god list focused on epithets of major deities, in which her section appears between Shala's and Ninurta's. In addition to the primary name they include ^{d}SUKKAL (a logographic writing of the name), Papsukkal, Papgal, Iggalla, Gandu, Gangu, ^{d}LAMMA and Dukuga. The names Gandu and Gangu are likely variants of each other and might be related to a term referring to a part of a door; Dukuga is derived from the Duku, a mythical location after which a type of seat located in temples was named.

== Character ==
Ninshubur is regarded by Assyriologists as "the earliest and most important" sukkal, linked to the deities she served "not as cause and effect, but as command and execution". Her two main functions were these of "intercessory goddess" and "archetypal attendant of the gods". She served Inanna, but also Anu and by extension the entire divine assembly. The association with Anu is known from sources from the reign of Third Dynasty of Ur onward, and might be a secondary development, with Inanna being her primary and original mistress. As Inanna's sukkal, Ninshubur was believed to implement divine rules and regulations on her behalf. Her role as a popular intercessory deity in Mesopotamian religion was derived from her position as a servant of major deities, which resulted in the belief that she was capable of mediating with her masters on behalf of human petitioners. A hymn (CBS 14073) describes her as a servant of not only her usual masters, but also Enlil, Enki, Damgalnuna, Nanna, Ningal, Ninurta, Ninhursag and Utu. Frans Wiggermann notes that Ninshubur's association with the divine assembly treated as a whole indicates that even though she shared many of her roles with another well attested sukkal, Nuska, she was ultimately considered the higher-ranked member of the pantheon.

In addition to her usual title, Ninshubur could also be called sukkal anna, "heavenly attendant". An inscription of Rim-Sîn I refers to her as a sukkalmaḫ. According to Wiggermann, while this term is attested as an administrative rank and in this context refers to an official responsible for managing the activities of multiple people holding the rank of sukkal, there is no indication that it had a similar meaning when applied to deities, and in this context its use is most likely only meant to exalt the bearer. Ninshubur was also referred to as sukkalmaḫ in Malgium, though according to Raphael Kutscher in this case the use of this title should be considered the result of Elamite cultural influence. Ninshubur could also be referred to as SAL.ḪÚB_{2}. This term is sparsely attested overall, and it assumed that it referred to a deity considered to be a sukkal who was viewed as emotionally close to their lord or lady. In most of cases SAL.ḪÚB_{2} appears in literary texts in parallel with "sukkal". Ninshubur is the only deity referred to as SAL.ḪÚB_{2} in more than one or two sources, with seven instances known as of 2014. ^{d}NIN.AB.KID.KID, who might be identical with Ninshubur, is already described as the SAL.ḪÚB_{2} of Inanna in the thirty ninth of the Zame Hymns. Ninshubur is also referred to with this title in an Old Babylonian dedicatory inscription from the reign of Samsu-iluna. In another text, she is described as the "beloved SAL.ḪÚB_{2} of Inanna", and appears in a short list of members of her family right after Dumuzi.

A number of references to Ninshubur as the "mother of the land" are known. A theological text composed during the reign of the Third Dynasty of Ur states that "Ninshubur occupies the land" and includes her among the highest ranking gods, alongside Enlil, Ninlil, Nanna, Inanna, Enki, Nergal, Ninurta and Nuska. The deified hero Gilgamesh appears in it as well, seemingly to elevate his standing among gods due to his role in the royal ideology of that time period. Gábor Zólyomi notes that a hymn focusing on Ninshubur in the role of "mother of the land" (BL 195, known from the tablet Ash. 1911.326 from the Ashmolean Museum) employs multiple topoi related to abundance in Sumerian literature, for example building of cattle pens and sheepfolds under her command, otherwise not associated with her. Another hymn (CBS 14073) mentions both her role as a divine attendant and that of "mother of the land". In addition to this metaphorical role, Ninshubur was also referred to as a "mother" in personal names. However, references to her as an actual "birth mother" are uncommon and unusual according to Julia M. Asher-Greve. It is possible that this aspect of her character was responsible for her unusual and unparalleled placement in the Old Babylonian Mari god list, where she occurs after Ninhursag and Nintur and before Aruru.

Some hymns indicate that the role of a divine healer was occasionally ascribed to Ninshubur.

== Gender ==
The modern consensus view among Assyriologists is that Ninshubur was always identified as a female deity when associated with Inanna. At the same time, many authors propose that Ninshubur was male when associated with Anu. While the second millennium BCE god list An = Anu ša āmeli explains that "Ninshubur is Papsukkal when Anu is concerned", Papsukkal being the name of a male messenger deity, Frans Wiggermann argues that the only texts from the third millennium BCE which identify Ninshubur's gender state that she was a goddess, rather than a god. However, Manfred Krebernik and Jan Lisman suggests that two separate Ninshuburs, one female (Inanna's) and one male (Anu's) were already recognized in the Early Dynastic period as the name occurs twice in the god lists from Abu Salabikh and Fara. Gábor Zólyomi nonetheless translates a passage related to Ninshubur's role as a servant of Anu as referring to her as a female deity. Texts from Lagash from the Early Dynastic period refer to Ninshubur exclusively as a goddess according to Toshiko Kobayashi. According to Marcos Such-Gutiérrez, the evidence from Adab is not entirely conclusive, though might point at the female version of this deity being worshiped there too, despite attested connection to Anu.

In most Akkadian texts Ninshubur was regarded as male, though it is possible exceptions did exist. According to Raphael Kutscher, Ninshubur might have been viewed as female in Malgium when worshiped alongside Ulmašītum, though Douglas Frayne treats this deity as male in his translation of an inscription from this location. In the Old Babylonian and Kassite periods in Nippur Ninshubur was also considered female. However, whether her name on Kassite seals refers to a god or a goddess is presently unknown.

Uri Gabbay proposed that Ninshubur's identity was a mirror of the gala clergy, but this view is not supported by other researchers, as regardless of gender Ninshubur was never described as a gala, and the only similarity between her and this class of clergy was their shared ability to appease specific deities. Wolfgang Heimpel suggested another solution, namely that three separate deities shared the same name, one female (according to him found for example in association with Inanna in Ur) and two male (one associated with Anu and yet another worshiped in Girsu), with no ambiguity of gender in any case. However, the matter of Ninshubur's gender was in some cases already unclear to ancient scribes, with one Old Babylonian hymn (CBS 15119+) possibly being an attempt at reconciling conflicting accounts by describing Ninshubur (identified as female in this context by Frans Wiggermann) as dressed in both feminine (left side) and masculine (right side) robes.

The view that Ninshubur was male as a servant of An in Sumerian texts from the third millennium BCE relies on the widely accepted assumption that a deity's sukkal matched their gender. However, Amasagnudi, regarded as a goddess in known sources and in one case equated with female Ninshubur, was also said to be a sukkal of Anu in an Old Babylonian document. Ninshubur herself appears as the sukkal of Nergal instead of Ugur or Ishum (both of them male) in a Sumerian text dated to the Old Babylonian period.

Ninshubur was not the only Mesopotamian deity whose gender varied in ancient sources, other examples include Ninkasi (the deity of beer, female in earlier sources but at times male later on), the couple Ninsikila and Lisin, whose genders were in some instances switched around, Uṣur-amāssu, described as a son of Adad in the god list An = Anum but as his daughter in sources from Uruk from the first millennium BCE, and the Venus deity Ninsianna, whose varying gender might be connected to dual role as personification of both the morning star and the evening star.

=== Syncretism with male deities ===
It has been proposed that the variance in Ninshubur's gender is related to syncretism between her and the male Akkadian god Ilabrat. In texts from the second millennium BCE, Ninshubur and Ilabrat coexisted. It is assumed that at least some cases Ninshubur's name, when treated as masculine, was a logographic spelling of Ilabrat's, for example in Mari in personal names. However, Ichiro Nakata nonetheless lists a single instance name from this city in which Ninshubur according to his analysis is treated as a female deity.

Ninshubur was additionally syncretised with Papsukkal, originally the sukkal of Zababa, tutelary god of Kish. Papsukkal's rise to prominence at the expense of other similar figures, such as Ninshubur, was likely rooted in the presence of the word sukkal in his name. While an association between the two is attested in the god list An = Anum already, (Note: Ninshubur and Papsukkal are directly equated in line 41 of tablet I.) the conflation was only finalized in the Seleucid period in Uruk. Papsukkal was not worshiped in that city in earlier periods, and in contrast with Ninshubur appeared only infrequently as a family deity or in personal names, but in the context of the so-called "antiquarian theology" relying largely on god lists, which developed in Uruk under Achaemenid rule, he was fully identified with Ninshubur and thus became Anu's sukkal and one of the eighteen major deities of the city. The late syncretic Papsukkal was not regarded as the sukkal of Anu and Ishtar, but rather Anu and Antu as a pair instead.

Despite the syncretism leading to perception of Ninshubur as a male deity, it is possible that the goddess Amasagnudi, worshiped alongside Papsukkal in Seleucid Uruk, was originally an epithet of female Ninshubur, a manifestation of her or at least a similar goddess sharing the role of sukkal of Anu. Frans Wiggermann translates this name as "mother who cannot be pushed aside".

Julia Krul suggests that the conflation between two deities from the court of Enki, male Isimud and female Ara, might have been influenced by the similar process involving Ninshubur. In An = Anum (tablet II line 275) Ninshubur is also equated with another deity associated with Enki, Gadala-abzu, (Note: Ryan D. Winters argues that while no explicit statement to that effect can be found in this text, Gadala-abzu can implicitly be considered a child of Enki due to occurring after an enumeration of his sons and a daughter.) "linen-clad of the abzu", though in this case both figures are understood as male.

== Attributes and iconography ==
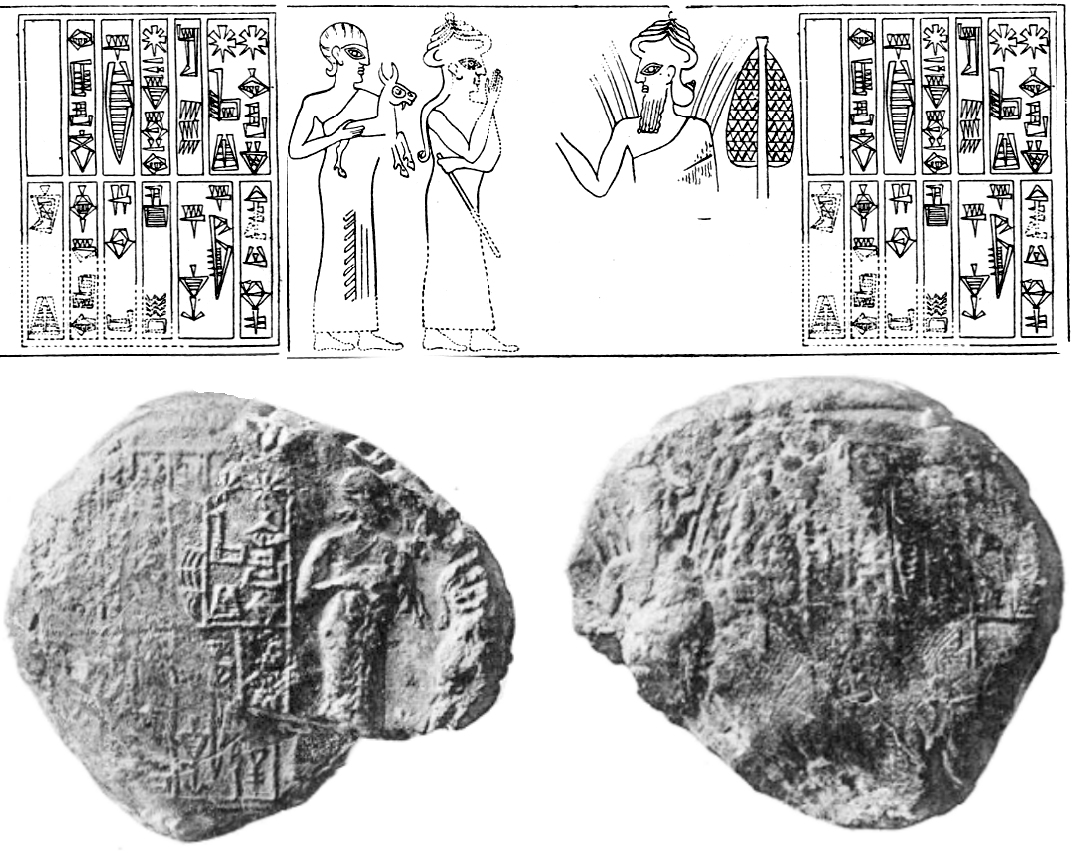
A seal of Lugal-ushumgal as servant of Naram-Sin, possibly depicting Ninshubur

Ninshubur's attribute was a staff, a sign of her office as a sukkal representing right to rule granted to her by her masters, It is possible that it was believed Ninshubur therefore bestowed similar privileges upon kings. Other gods' divine attendants were depicted holding staffs too, including Alla (Ningishzida's), Isimud (Enki's) and Nuska (Enlil's). A sukkal was expected to walk in front of their master, leading the way with their staff. Other objects associated with Ninshubur included doors and shoes, and her epithet in a single source is "pure minister of the lapis lazuli shoes." According to Julia Krul, said title is bestowed upon Ninshubur by Inanna in a late variant of one of the city laments, and might reflect her "arduous travels in her lady's service".

Very few depictions of female Ninshubur have been identified with certainty, though it is possible she is the deity on seals of Lugal-ushumgal, governor of Lagash during the reigns of Naram-Sin of Akkad and his son Shar-Kali-Sharri. It is also known that during building rituals figures of Ninshubur were buried under temples of other gods in some cases. A "letter-prayer" possibly referring to a statue of Ninshubur mentions that the deity had a "face exuding allure", and describes Ninshubur's physique in terms similar to these sometimes applied to Inanna.

It has been proposed that in Girsu, where Ninshubur was regarded as the wife of Meslamtaea (in this context a name of Nergal), she can be identified as a goddess accompanied by his symbolic composite animal, the "lion-griffin", similar to how Geshtinanna was accompanied by mušḫuššu, a symbol of her husband Ningishzida, and that on Old Babylonian seals the double lion-headed mace associated with Nergal might represent Ninshubur in the role of a deity related to him.

The constellation Orion, known in ancient Mesopotamia as Sipazianna, "the true shepherd of heaven", was regarded as the astral symbol of Ninshubur, as well as Ilabrat and Papsukkal.

== Association with other deities ==
=== Family and court ===
No clear evidence exists regarding Ninshubur's parentage, which is considered unusual in the light of her importance in Mesopotamian religion. In early sources she usually did not have a spouse. In Girsu, she was the spouse of Meslamtaea, in this context to be understood as a byname used to refer to Nergal in early sources from southern Mesopotamian cities. Marcos Such-Gutiérrez notes that it is possible that this tradition was also known in Adab, where Ninshubur appears alongside Meslamtaea in two lists of offerings. Frans Wiggermann notes that the pairing of Nergal with Ninshubur is unusual, as she was the only goddess sometimes regarded as his wife who had a well defined role other than that of his spouse, the other exception being Ereshkigal. He assumes that since many of Nergal's attested spouses, such as Mammitum or Admu, were possibly associated with the earth, this role of Ninshubur was tied to her function as "lady of the earth". No other examples of Ninshubur being regarded as another deity's wife are known. A single source refers to Ninshubur as Nergal's sukkal rather than wife. Dina Katz on the basis of the connection between those two deities suggests that a tradition connecting Ninshubur to the underworld might have existed in early periods, but notes that no potential references to it occur in any sources postdating the Old Babylonian period.

An = Anum contains lists of five daughters (tablet I, lines 48-52) and fourteen sons (tablet I, lines 53-66) of the male Ninshubur, who are not attested anywhere else. According to Frans Wiggermann it cannot be automatically assumed that they were associated with the female Ninshubur in earlier periods, though due to her greater importance it is nonetheless possible at least some of the information pertaining to family and courtiers mentioned in An = Anum originated in texts focused on her rather than any of her male counterparts. The daughters include ^{d}PAP.PAP, Ḫedu, Ninḫedubi, Ninkita and Munus-saga. The reading of the first name is uncertain, with both Kurkur and Papa, a widespread hypocoristic name in the third millennium BCE, being considered possible. Ninḫedubi is also attested alongside Papsukkal in a ritual dealing with the restoration of a door. The names of this goddess, as well as her sister Ḫedu, likely were originally derived from the term ḫé-du_{7}, literally "may it befit", metaphorically "adornment", but later came to be reinterpreted as references to architectural terms, since ḫé-du_{7} (loaned into Akkadian as ḫittu) could also mean "architrave". It is also possible that Ninkita's name can be interpreted as "lady of the doorstep".

An = Anum refers to Māgiru ("obedient") as the "herald" (gu-za-lá) of Ninshubur's sanctuary in Akkil (tablet I, line 255), though the same deity is also mentioned alongside Šeri as one of the two bulls of Adad (tablet III, lines 233-234), which according to Wilfred G. Lambert should be considered unusual. Daniel Schwemer states the latter attestation is likely to be a scribal mistake, as Šeri was conventionally paired with Ḫurri, not Māgiru. Both the Old Babylonian forerunner of An = Anum and An = Anum itself (tablet I, line 48) also provide Ninshubur with an udug (in this context a type of minor protective deity) named Egubidugga ("who lets the house resound pleasantly").

=== Ninshubur and Inanna ===
Ninshubur, under the variant name Ninakkil, is already regarded as a servant of Inanna in the Zame Hymns from Early Dynastic Abu Salabikh. Frans Wiggermann describes the relation between them as very close. It was believed that Inanna bestowed Ninshubur's titles upon her and made her a sukkal. In a hymn (CBS 14073), Inanna addressed Ninshubur endearingly as "my mother". In another, she is called the "beloved attendant" and appears right after Dumuzi and before other relatives. Ninshubur was regarded as a guardian of Inanna's secrets and as her adviser, though according to one text the latter could scoff at offered advice, both incorrect and correct. Ninshubur was also capable of "appeasing" Inanna, and one of her epithets was "who flatters the heart of Inanna". Various epithets related to this function are preserved in the god list An = Anum. Additionally, a temple dedicated to her whose location is not presently known bore the name E-šatezu, "house which knows the soothing of the heart". It is attested in a hymn dedicated to king Shulgi, though it is uncertain if it corresponds to structures dedicated to Ninshubur mentioned in texts from his reign.

The role of a mediator between a major deity and worshipers played by Ninshubur in the cult of Inanna has been compared to that played by the spouses of other major gods, for example Aya in the relation to Shamash or Shala in relation to Adad.

Sumerian literary catalogs list at least 7 hymns dedicated to Ninshubur which based on surviving incipits described her lamenting over something that happened to Inanna.

=== Ninshubur and Lamma goddesses ===
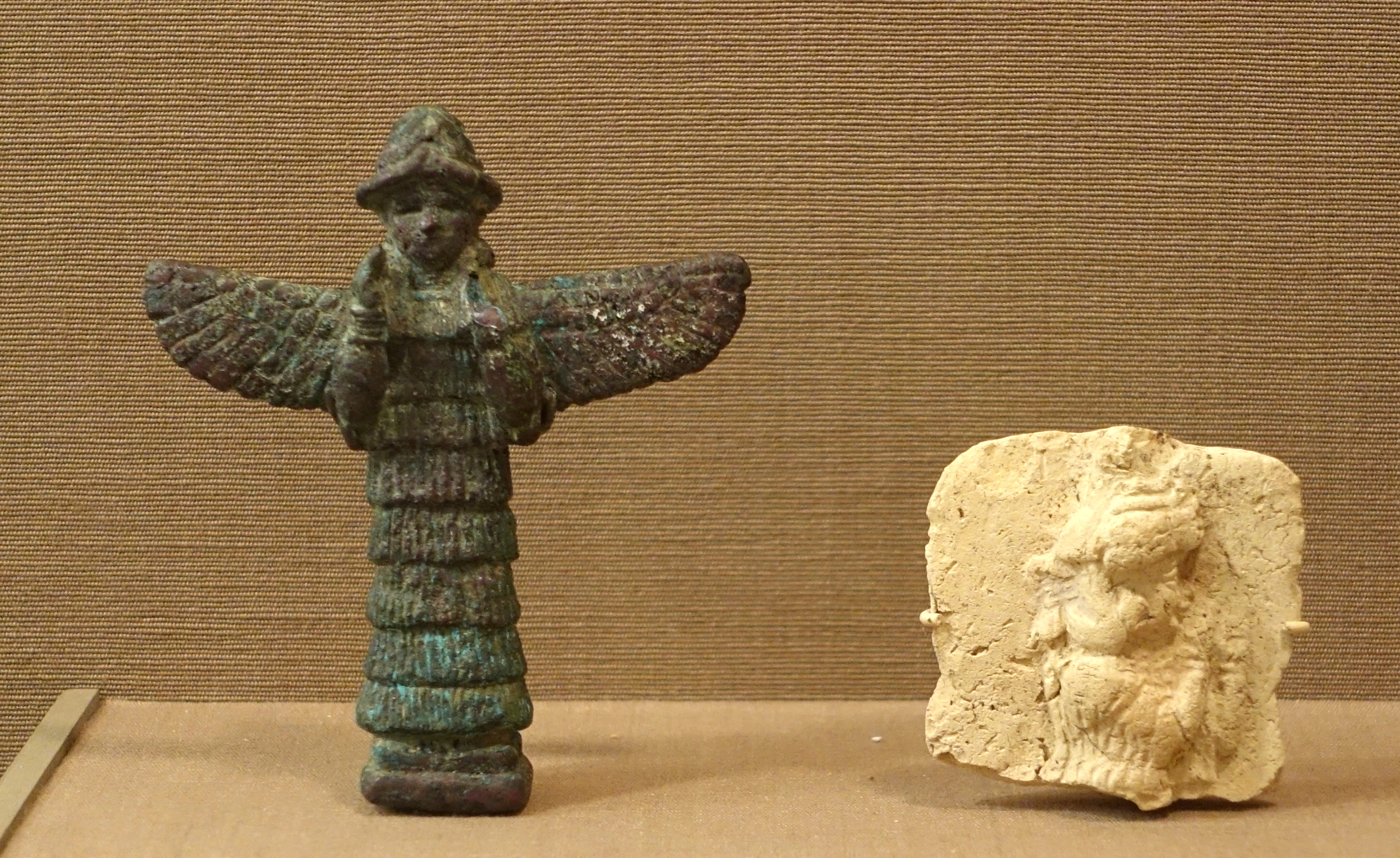
Depictions of Lamma goddesses from the Isin-Larsa period, 2000-1800 BCE. Oriental Institute Museum, University of Chicago.

Ninshubur was associated with the Lamma, a class of minor goddesses, likely due to their shared role in intercession between mortals and higher ranking deities. (Note: A similar association with Lamma was also attributed to Nanaya, regarded as "lady of Lamma" She was viewed as a servant of Inanna much like Ninshubur, and in god lists, for example in the Weidner god list, she usually appears after the latter, before any further related deities (such as Kanisurra, Gazbaba or Bizilla).) In An = Anum ša amēli, ^{d}Lamma is listed as the title of Ninshubur as a deity associated with these goddesses (ša la-ma-si). Julia M. Asher-Greve explains the character of Lamma as that of "protective and tutelary goddesses" and notes that they are the figures most commonly appearing in so-called "presentation scenes" in ancient Mesopotamian art, in which a minor goddess (Lamma) leads a human to a seated major deity. Lamma could also be a designation for specific goddesses in contexts in which their functions were analogous to these usually fulfilled by this category of deities, with Gudea occasionally calling the Anuna (in this context a collective term for the major deities) gods "Lamma of all countries". The nature of Lamma can be compared to that of the modern concept of guardian angel.

=== Other associations ===
In Mari Kakka, a local healing goddess, attested only in personal names, was associated with Ninshubur, but also with the medicine goddess Ninkarrak. This deity most likely should be regarded as distinct from Kakka, the sukkal of Anshar, known from the god list An = Anum (where the medicine goddess Kakka appears separately in Ninkarrak's section) and from the later myth Enuma Elish. Ninshubur was identified with the latter Kakka in An = Anum, but only in the specific role of "one who holds the great scepter" (tablet I, line 31). The connection is not yet attested in the Old Babylonian An = Anum forerunner, in which Kakka occurs in a context indicating the female deity is meant. According to Ryan D. Winters it is possible that the male Kakka was a secondary development and his role in literary texts was patterned on male Ninshubur.

A single Old Babylonian letter associates Ninshubur with Lugalnamtarra, a deity possibly analogous to Namtar, and invokes both of them to bless the recipient. Lugalnamtarra, as well as a deity whose name was written as ^{d}SUKKAL, who according to Odette Boivin might be analogous to Ninshubur, both appear in association with Shamash in texts from the archives of the First Sealand dynasty in place of his usual attendants (such as Bunene). Akurduana, one of the kings of Sealand, included the title "servant of Utu and Ninshubur" in his royal titulature. In Isin, Ninshubur was seemingly instead incorporated into the entourage of the medicine goddess Ninisina. She accordingly appears in the Isin god list in the section enumerating deities linked to both Ninisina and Inanna. Other members of this group who shared this status include Ninigizibara and Ninḫinuna. Frans Wiggermann states an attestation of Ninshubur appearing alongside Alammuš in the court of Nanna is also known. In the Early Dynastic Abu Salabikh god list she appears next Nanna's wife Ningal. In Malgium in the Old Babylonian period, she seemingly fulfilled the role of a sukkal in relation to Ulmašītum. In Nippur at least in the sphere of cult she was linked to the circle of the local goddess Nintinugga.

In a greeting formula in a latter from Old Babylonian Larsa, Ninshubur is paired with the otherwise unknown goddess Mārat-ūmi, "daughter of the day" or "daughter of the storm". In a single incantation dated to the end of the third millennium BCE, possibly a part of a building ritual, she appears alongside the divine potter Nunura. She is rare in magical texts otherwise, though she is attested in an incantation from the Ur III period alongside Asalluhi, and in a late liver omen text "hand of Ninshubur" is listed one of the possible diagnoses.

== Worship ==
There is evidence for creation of cult statues and votive offerings dedicated to Ninshubur from various locations in the Early Dynastic period already. Due to her intercessory role, she was popular in the sphere of personal worship, for example as a family deity. She was also among the deities invoked in theophoric names in many periods.

=== Akkil, Uruk and Badtibira ===
Akkil, where Ninshubur was worshiped as an attendant of Inanna, was considered her primary cult center. She is the goddess of this location in the Temple Hymns, though Walther Sallaberger notes that she can be considered one of the members of a group of deities associated with Uruk in this context nonetheless, similar to Dumuzi and Ningirima. Frans Wiggermann is uncertain if Akkil should be interpreted as a town or as a temple, and favors the latter interpretation due to lack of references to it in economic texts. Joan Goodnick Westenholz in a more recent publication instead concluded it was a town located close to Bad-tibira. Ninshubur's temple located in that settlement was E-(a)akkil, whose ceremonial name has been translated as "house of lamentation" by Andrew R. George. The city is to be distinguished from a temple of Papsukkal in Kish also known as Akkil, and from a sanctuary of Manungal, the goddess of prisons, also bearing such a name. A number of objects dedicated to "Ninshubur of Akkil" are known, including artifacts from the Early Dynastic period and a vessel inscribed by a sanga priests of Inanna from Uruk in the Ur III period. Some of the former have been dedicated to her by an individual Ur-Akkilla, who was presumably particularly devoted to her, as reflected by his own name, as well as the name of his daughter Gan-Šubur.

In the Early Dynastic period Ninshubur's cult was already established in Uruk, as indicated by votive inscriptions, and it is considered possible that it was transferred there from Akkil. She continues to appear in sources from this city in the Ur III period, when Shulgi built a new temple dedicated to her there. A year name of either this king or his predecessor Ur-Nammu mentions the building of a "temple kitchen" of Ninshubur, which might be related to a foundation tablet dedicated to her found in Uruk, though this remains uncertain.

A document from the reign of Shu-Sin indicates that Ninshubur was also worshiped in Bad-tibira.

=== Lagash and Girsu ===
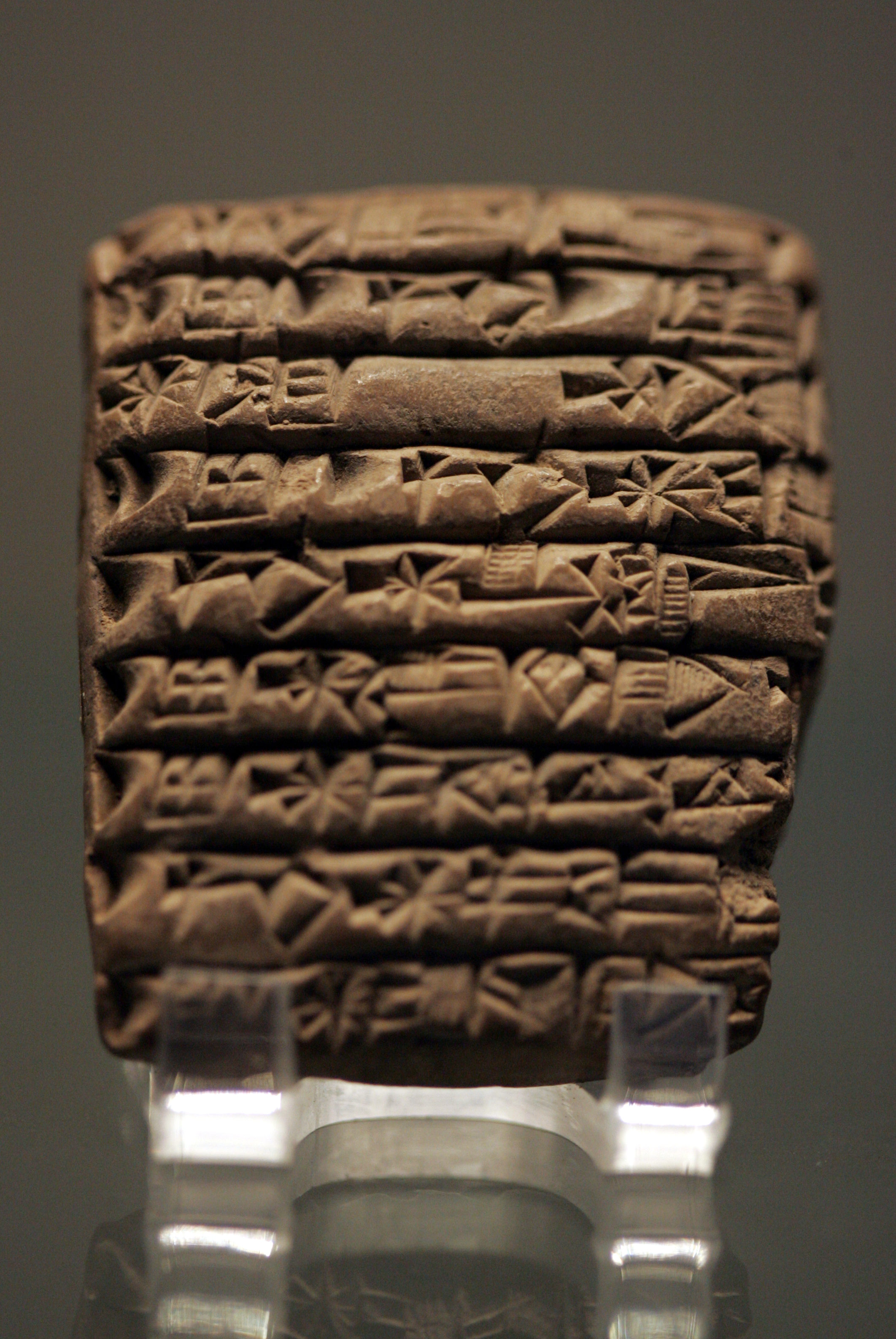
A tablet mentioning sacrifices made to various gods worshiped in the state of Lagash, including Ninshubur. Louvre.

Ninshubur is well attested in sources from the state of Lagash. Offerings were typically made to her in the city of Girsu. She was already worshiped there when the area was under the rule of Lugalanda (around 2400 BCE), during whose reign she was celebrated during festivals of Nanshe and Ningirsu and received offerings from the king's wife, Barnamtarra. There is no evidence pertaining to Ninshubur from the reign of Lugalanda's predecessor Enentarzi, which makes it possible she a deity worshiped by commoners at first, and only started to receive offerings from the official administration during the period of the latter monarch's rule. A temple dedicated to her, E-ešbarmeluḫḫa, "house of decisions which cleans the me," existed in Girsu. It is possible, though not certain, that E-mekilibbasagil, "house which lifts on high all the me," known from later royal inscriptions, was also located in this city. Only a single theophoric name invoking Ninshubur is known from the Lagash area from the Early Dynastic period, Ninshubur-amamu, "Ninshubur is my mother".

A later ruler of Lagash, Urukagina, regarded Ninshubur as his personal deity. In offering lists from his reign she was placed above Mesandu, who possibly had an analogous role during the reigns of earlier local kings. Puzer-Mama, who ruled Lagash around 2200 BCE, mentions Ninshubur in his royal inscriptions, possibly in reference to Urukagina's reverence for her, as it is likely that they came from the same family and thus shared the same personal goddess, though he might also have considered her a divine mediator guaranteeing Lagash its territorial rights, regained from rulers of the Akkadian Empire. Another ruler of Lagash who regarded her as his personal goddess was Nammahani, brother in law of Gudea. Gudea himself referred to Ninshubur as his nin ("mistress"). Statues dedicated for the life of a ruler to Ninshubur and to Ningishzida are also known from the periods of Nammahani's and Ur-Ningirsu II's rule.

=== Ur and Enegi ===
Ninshubur is first attested in Ur in the Ur III period. E-ninbitum ("house fit for a lady"), a temple dedicated to her, or according to Wolfgang Heimpel a cella in a temple dedicated to Inanna, is attested in texts from this city. It might be the same temple as E-aggasummmu, "house which gives decrees," also presumed to be located in Ur. Shulgi referred to her as "mistress". However, she does not appear in the official cultic calendars and offering lists from this location from the reign of his dynasty, despite being a popular deity, which according to Julia M. Asher-Greve finds a parallel in Nanshe's position in the local pantheon. References to "Ninshubur of Enegi" appear in texts from Ur as well. It has been suggested she was introduced to the latter city from Uruk, as the local pantheon included other typically Urukean deities, such as the deified hero Gilgamesh and his mother Ninsun. References to Ninshubur receiving offerings there appear in texts from Puzrish-Dagan too. In one case, Ninshubur of Enegi is called the "small Ninshubur" (Ninshubur-banda), in contrast with Ninshubur of Akkil or Uruk, referred to as "great Ninshubur" (Ninshubur-gula).

During excavations of Ur, chapels of Ninshubur and Hendursaga, as well as votive objects to dedicated to them from Isin-Larsa period have been found. It is uncertain if a statue found in the Ninshubur chapel represents any deity, or a human. for example a princess or en priestess, though it has been noted that she lacks the horned crown associated with divinity. A "letter-prayer" to Ninshubur (UET 6/1, 7) which indicates that such texts were presented to a statue of the deity, is also assumed to be from Ur, though it is regarded as likely that it was sent by a king of Larsa, possibly Rim-Sîn I. Records indicate that he built temples of both female and male Ninshubur. In an inscription commemorating the building of a temple of Ninshubur in Ur, he refers to this deity as a goddess, while in a later one commemorating the defeat of Uruk - as a god. It is likely he was particularly devoted to this deity.

=== Other cities ===
Ninshubur appears in sources from Nippur in the Early Dynastic period already, and it is possible she was introduced to the local pantheon directly from Akkil, like in the case of Uruk. In the Old Babylonian period, she received offerings in the temple complexes of Enlil and Ninurta. Her temple in this city was Eakkilduku, "house of lamentation, the pure mound". It is possible it can be identified with a nameless sanctuary mentioned in an inscription dated to the reign of Ibbi-Sin.

Since before the Sargonic period, Ninshubur was also present in the pantheon of Adab. Meskigal, a ruler of this city, considered her his personal deity and dedicated a statue to her for the life of himself, his wife and children. A document dealing with distribution of bread to the Adab's temples indicates that one of them was dedicated to Ninshubur, and that its staff included a nin-dingir priestess. While Ninshubur's position in offering lists indicates she was a major deity in the local pantheon, very few theophoric names invoking her are attested.

Ninshubur is also attested in Early Dynastic texts from Shuruppak, the cult center of Sud. In Umma, she was worshiped alongside Inanna of Zabalam.

According to Jennie Myers, Ninshubur is also attested in Sippar, where the theonym according to her should be read phonetically in Sumerian names, and as "Ilabrat" in less common Akkadian ones. The worship of Ninshubur in this city is no longer attested after the reign of Sin-Muballit. The reasons behind this are unknown.

In Malgium, a kingdom located to the south of Eshnunna, Ninshubur was worshiped in a temple built by the local king Takil-ilissu in the Old Babylonian period. An inscription states that various festivals dedicated to this deity were held in the courtyard of the temple of Ulmašītum, which bore the ceremonial name Emaš (possibly erroneous writing of Eulmaš). In the same text Ninshubur is invoked in a curse formula alongside Anu, Ulmašītum, Annunitum, and the divine lions Dan-bītum and Rašub-bītum to guarantee that nobody removes Takil-ilissu's name from the foundation of the temple.

In Tell Ishchali a sanctuary of Ninshubur was a part of the temple complex of the local goddess Kitītum. Its staff might have included an en priest.

Other cities where Ninshubur was apparently worshiped include Akkad (in the Sargonic period), Isin, Larsa, Mari and in the Old Babylonian period, and later on Babylon and Kish, but it is difficult to tell if the deity in mention was female Ninshubur, male Ninshubur, or Ilabrat.

== Mythology ==
In literary texts, Ninshubur frequently accompanies Inanna.

=== Inanna's descent to the Netherworld ===
Ninshubur appears in the myth Inanna s Descent to the Netherworld. It is presently known from a total of fifty eight copies from the Old Babylonian period, with most found during excavations in Ur and Nippur, as well as from a fragment from the Middle Babylonian period. It is assumed it belonged to the curriculum of scribal schools. However, no first millennium BCE examples are known.

Before Inanna embarks on her journey to the land of the dead, seemingly motivated by a desire to take over it, she instructs Ninshubur what to do if she will not return after three days. It is assumed that this scene is supposed to establish that she is not going to be trapped in the underworld permanently. After this period time passes, Ninshubur, following her mistress' instructions, mourns her death by lamenting and wearing rags and pleads with the gods Enlil, Nanna and Enki in an effort to persuade them to rescue Inanna. In all three cases, she repeats the same formula:

(...) do not let your daughter bow down (before) anybody in the Netherworld! Do not let your beautiful precious metal mix with the dirt of the Netherworld! Do not let your beautiful lapis lazuli be split apart like the stone cutter's stone! Do not let your boxwood be cut like the carpenter’s wood! Do not let maiden Inana bow down in the Netherworld!

Victor Hurowitz considered it possible that the terms which Ninshubur uses to illustrate the possible dreadful fate of Inanna in the netherworld during her attempts to persuade other gods to help her might be a mythical reflection of a ritual of renewal of a damaged statue. While the first two gods Ninshubur approaches, Enlil and Nanna, refuse to help her, she eventually manages to secure the aid of Enki. He creates two beings, galatura and kurĝara, who subsequently bring Inanna back.

After Inanna returns to the world of the living, Ninshubur, who was waiting at the gates of the underworld, throws herself at her feet. (Note: The term ganzir, used to refer to this location in this passage, is sparsely attested in Sumerian literature, only appearing in Gilgamesh, Enkidu and the Underworld otherwise.) The galla demons accompanying Inanna suggest they can take Ninshubur to replace her in the underworld, but she protests:

(...) This is my minister of fair words, my escort of trustworthy words. She did not forget my instructions. She did not neglect the orders I gave her. She made a lament for me on the ruin mounds. She beat the drum for me in the sanctuaries. She made the rounds of the gods’ houses for me. She lacerated her eyes for me, lacerated her nose for me. In private, she lacerated her buttocks for me. Like a pauper, she clothed herself in a single garment. All alone she directed her steps to the E-kur, to the house of Enlil, and to Urim, to the house of Nanna, and to Eridug, to the house of Enki. She brought me back to life. How could I turn her over to you?

Since Ninshubur is a faithful servant who mourned her properly, the demons are not allowed to take her. Inanna also does not allow them to take two further servants they meet, Shara and Lulal. Eventually they reach Dumuzi's city Bad-tibira, where it turns out that he did not mourn Inanna's death, which angers her. His behavior, contrasted with Ninshubur's (as well as Shara's and Lulal's), is meant to justify his eventual fate. Inanna lets the galla take him away. Ninshubur is not mentioned in the surviving lines of the remaining section of the narrative, which is focused on Dumuzi's attempt at escaping his fate and his confinement in the underworld.

Alhena Gadotti notes that an "inverted parallelism" exists between the role of Ninshubur in Inanna's Descent and that of Gilgamesh in another composition dealing with similar themes, Gilgamesh, Enkidu and the Underworld: in the former, a servant seeks help on behalf of her mistress, while in the latter text the roles are reversed, and it is Gilgamesh who wants to bring his companion Enkidu back. Dina Katz suggests that since Inanna's Descent was a widely circulated text, it is plausible that this part of the latter narrative was in part inspired by it.

Papsukkal takes Ninshubur's role in an Akkadian adaptation of Inanna's Descent focused on the counterpart of Inanna, Ishtar, but he is not directly designated as her personal servant, and the text states that he was serving "the great gods" as a group.

=== Inanna and Enki ===
In the myth Inanna and Enki, Ninshubur assists her mistress in escaping from enemies sent after her by Enki in the Boat of Heaven, ma_{2}an-na, also referred to as the "Both of An" in modern literature. The name of the boat is also attested in a fragment of an otherwise unknown narrative about Inanna and Enmerkar and in texts from Puzrish-Dagan, where it appears in association with Inanna and Nanaya during a festival, and in lists of offerings from Old Babylonian Isin, Larsa and Nippur.

After Inanna's theft of the me, Enki's monstrous servants attack the boat six times, but each time she repeats the formula "water has not touched your hands, water has not touched your feet" to Ninshubur, which according to Bendt Alter is meant to indicate that as long as the stay out of water they are out of the reach of Enki. After successfully escaping, they reach Uruk, and Ninshubur asks Inanna where she plans to unload the stolen items. The rest of the myth is poorly preserved.

=== Poem of Agushaya ===
In an Akkadian myth known under the title Poem of Agushaya or Hymn of Agushaya Ninshubur is tasked with providing Ishtar (the counterpart of Inanna) with information about the fearsome Saltu ("discord"), an opponent Ea (the counterpart of Enki) created for her, meant to serve as her mirror image. A peculiarity of this text are recurring misspellings of specific words in Ninshubur's speech. While it has been proposed that they are simply scribal errors, Benjamin R. Foster assumes this is implausible as all of them occur in two successive lines, and proposes that they were employed purposely to represent Ninshubur stuttering in shock due to Saltu's fearsome nature and her resemblance to Ishtar, translating the text accordingly:

She is b-bizarre in her actions, she b-behaves unreasoningly (...)

== Gallery ==
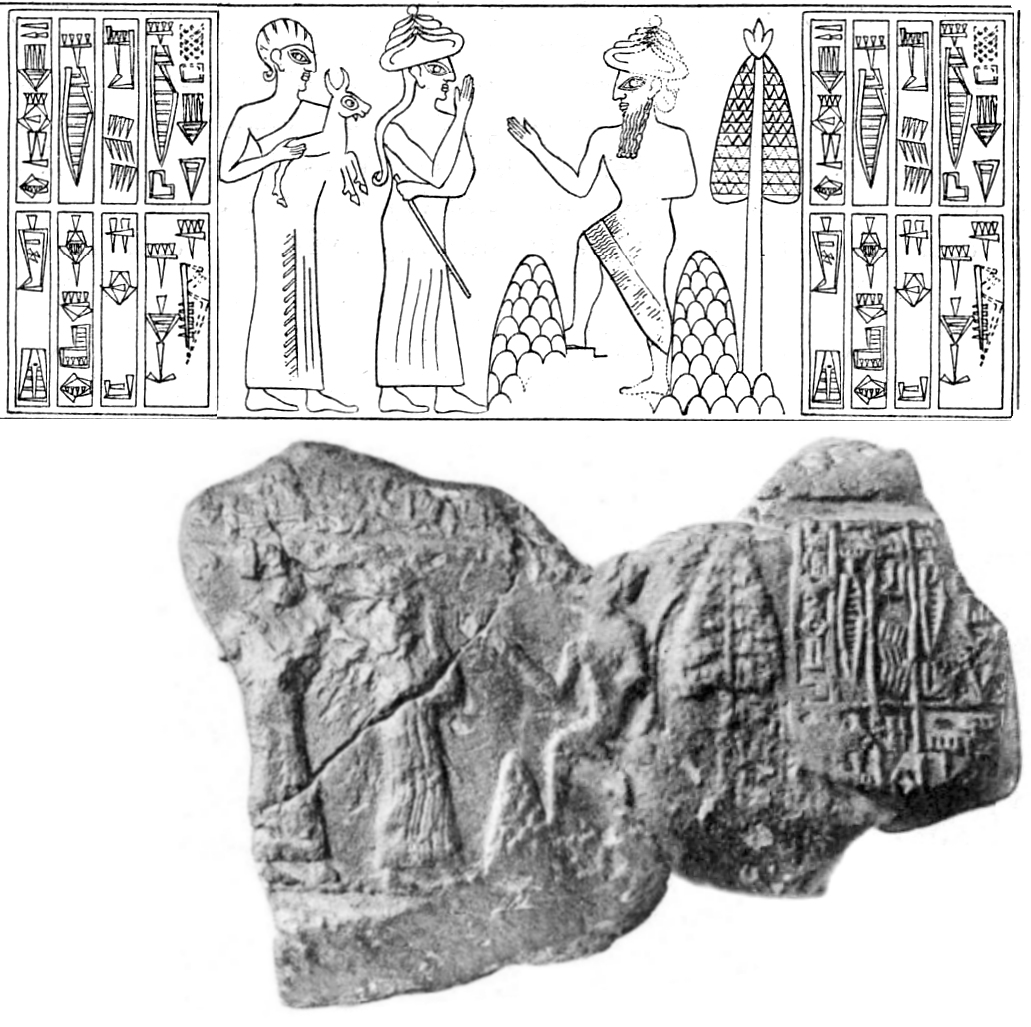
A seal of Lugal-ushumgal as servant of Shar-Kali-Sharri, possibly depicting Ninshubur

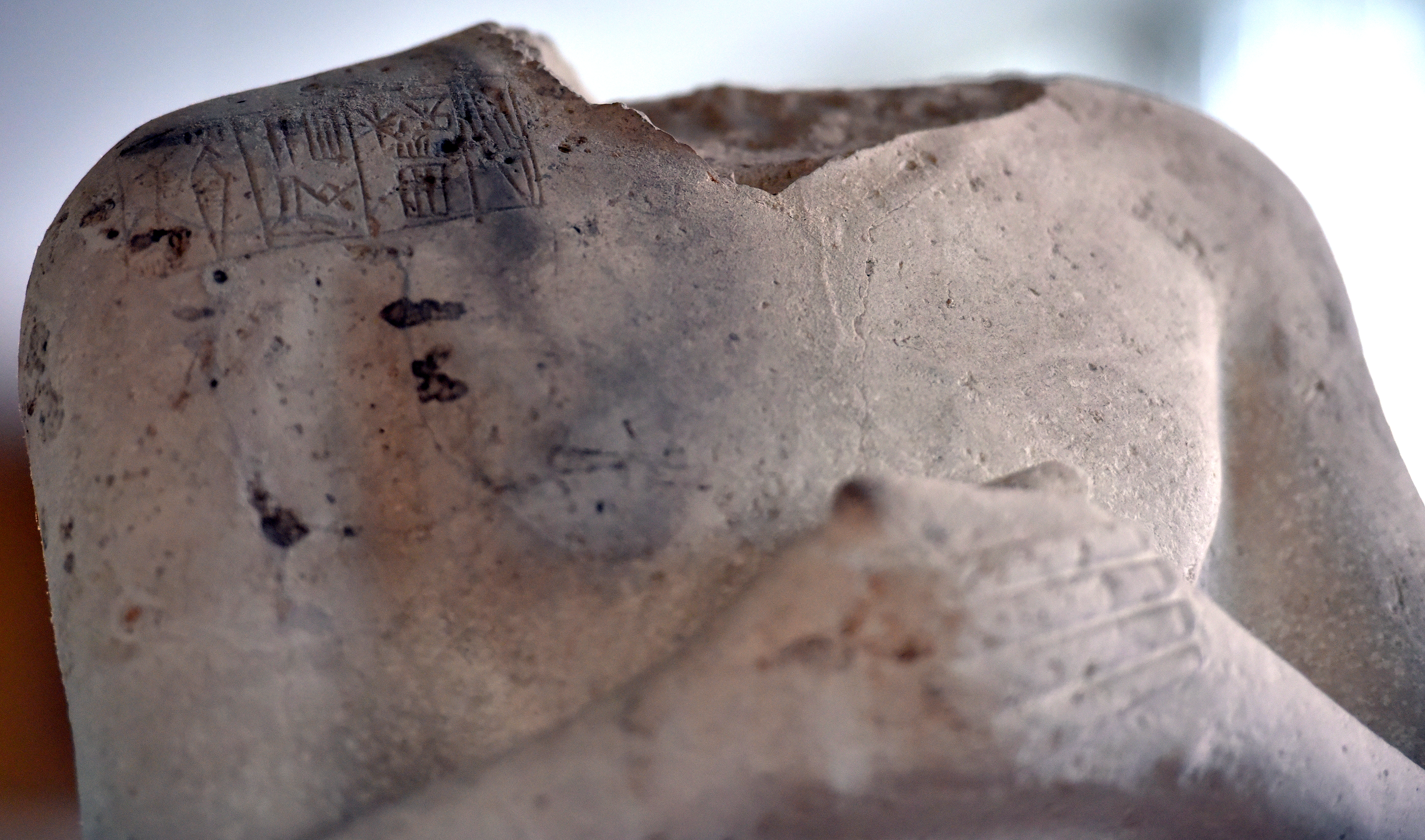
The name of the deity Ninshubur is mentioned on the right shoulder. From Adab, Iraq. 2600-2370 BCE. Iraq Museum.

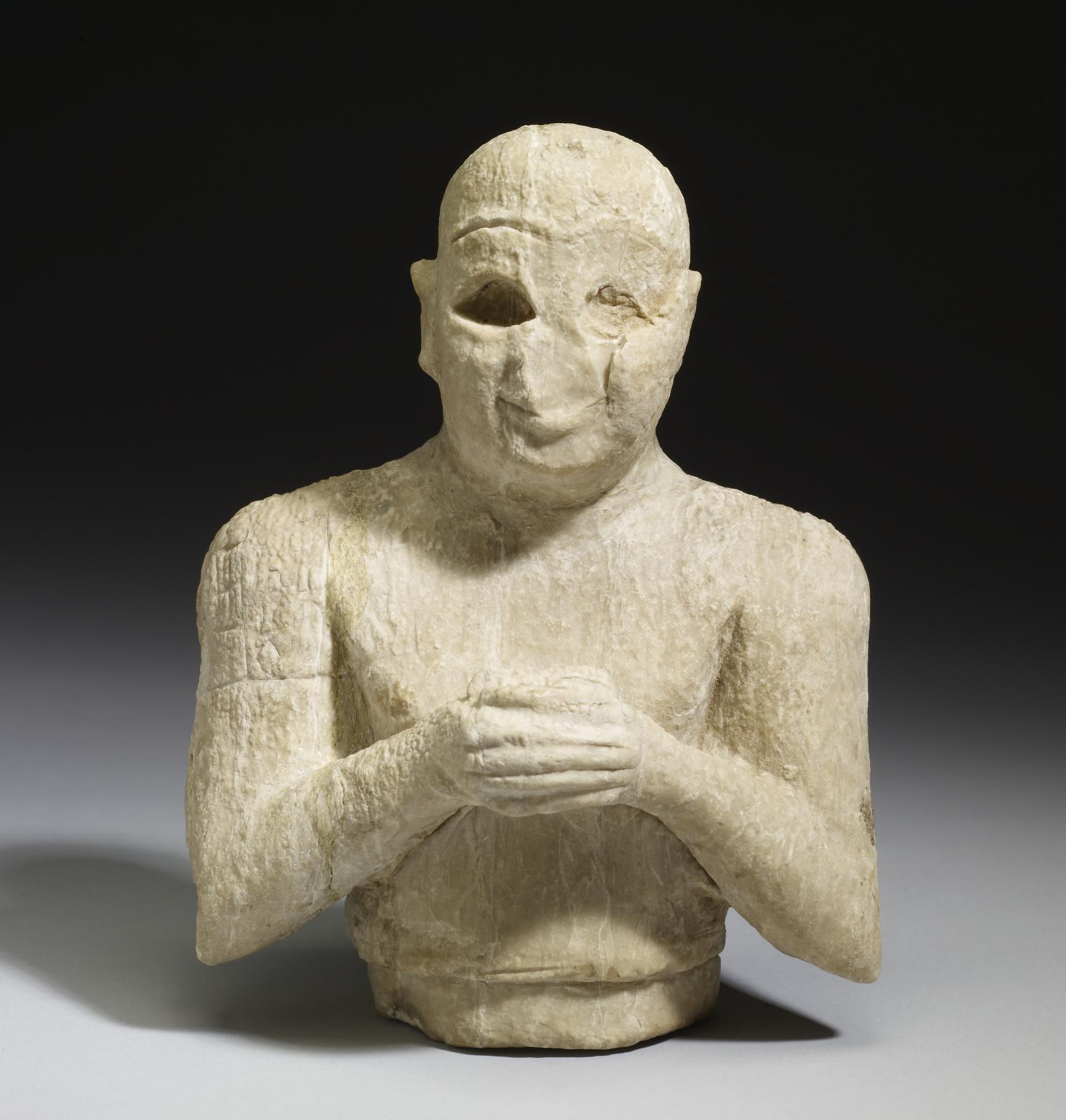
Ancient Sumerian calcite-alabaster figurine of a male worshiper. 2500 BCE - 2250 BCE. The inscription on his right arm mentions Ninshubur.

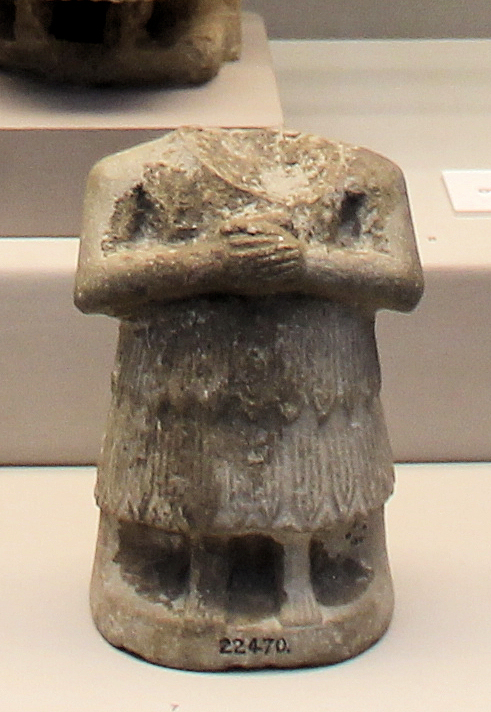
Statue from Der dedicated to Ninshubur by Enzi and his son Amar-kiku. 2400 BCE. British Museum, BM 22470.
