= Mummu =

Mesopotamian deity

- Sukkal of Apsu, personified creative force
- Animals: possibly wild sheep
- Parents: Apsu and Tiamat (according to Eudemus of Rhodes)

Mummu (Cuneiform: 𒀭𒈬𒌝𒈬, ^{d}mu-um-mu; logographically 𒀭𒌣, ^{d}DÉ) was a Mesopotamian god. His name is presumed to be derived from the Akkadian word mummu, "creative force". In addition to functioning as a theonym, it is attested as a title of multiple other deities highlighting their respective roles as creators. Ritual texts indicate that Mummu was perceived as an inactive figure, similarly to deities such as Enmesharra or Qingu.

Mummu is best known from the epic poem Enūma Eliš, where he is portrayed as a servant of Apsu (uncommonly treated as a personified deity rather than a supernatural body of water) defeated alongside his master by Ea. Attestations from outside Enūma Eliš are known too, though they are comparatively uncommon. A late reference to Mummu has been identified in a passage from the works of Eudemus of Rhodes preserved by Damascius.

== Name and character ==
Mummu's name could be written in cuneiform as mu-mu, mu-um or mu-um-mu. The "divine determinative" (dingir), a sign used to identify theonyms, was not applied to it consistently. In addition to phonetic syllabic spellings, the logographic writing ^{d}DÉ is also attested. It is presumed that Mummu's name is identical with the common Akkadian noun mummu, which can be translated as "creative power" or "creative spirit". It is a loanword from Sumerian, most likely derived from the word umun ("wisdom" or "skill"), though the latter was never used as a theonym. As an alternative derivation from mud, "to produce", or mú, "to (let) grow", has been proposed. The two homonymous words referring to noise (from Sumerian mu_{7}-mu_{7}) and a type of wooden object are unrelated. Eckhart Frahm argues that Mummu accordingly can be viewed as the personification of an abstract creative force.

In ritual texts Mummu was treated as a primordial deity residing in the underworld, similarly to figures like Qingu or Enmesharra, and he was typically kept separate from gods understood as still active in the present, like Enlil or Ea.

In the Enūma Eliš, Mummu fulfills the roles of a divine vizier (sukkal) and advisor (tamlaku) of Apsu. (Note: Apsu was usually regarded as a supernatural body of water, and applying this name to a personified deity instead is uncommon.) He could be sometimes equated with Papsukkal or Ilabrat, who are well known as servant deities. However, it is not certain if a tradition of portraying Mummu in such a role existed independently from the Enūma Eliš.

Due to his association with Apsu and by extension Tiamat it has been proposed that Mummu represented mist rising from primordial waters embodied by them. However, this assumption is not universally accepted.

=== As an epithet of other deities ===
In addition to functioning as a theonym, the term mummu is also attested as an epithet of other deities, most commonly Ea, though also Ishtar, (Note: An example has been identified in a prayer comparing her to Ea, as well as Enlil and Anu.) Nabu, Marduk and Tiamat; it was consistently used to designate them as creators.

== Iconography ==
Frans Wiggermann presumes that Mummu was imagined with the head of a ram, and suggests his name might have been linked with the onomatopoeia for a sheep's bleating, muh-muh. Wilfred G. Lambert proposed that in art Mummu might have been depicted as a wild sheep at least from the Kassite period onward. An inscription from the reign of Nazi-maruttaš states that he could serve as a symbol of Ea on kudurru, and next to the fish-goat the most well known symbolic representation of this god on these artifacts is the head of a horned animal which might be a wild sheep.

== Worship ==
According to Wilfred G. Lambert the earliest evidence for the worship of Mummu are two theophoric names, Old Akkadian mu-mu-sa-tu ("Mummu is a mountain") and Ur III mu-mu-ì-lum ("Mummu is a god"; known from a tablet dated to the fourth year of Shu-Sin's reign). Additionally, a mace head dedicated to Mummu (^{d}mu-mu) dated to the šakkanakku period is known from Mari. However, Manfred Krebernik states it is uncertain if these attestations refer to the same deity as Mummu known from later sources.

After a gap in attestations, Mummu occurs in an inscription on a boundary stone (kudurru) from the reign of the Kassite king Nazi-maruttaš, in which he is described as one of the two symbols of Ea, the other being the suḫurmašû (fish-goat).

A ritual for the opening of a river from the first millennium BCE known from a fragmentary tablet from Nineveh prescribes the preparation of silver discs for Mummu, Qingu and Ešret-nabnīssu, and the offering of heaps of flour and dates, mirsu dishes, a libation vessel, a juniper censer, and a sheep to them. The theonym Ešret-nabnīssu can be translated as "his ten creations", and might correspond to the ten creatures who aid Qingu in the Enūma Eliš, which might indicate that this grouping reflects the status of all of these figured as defeated enemies of the gods in this poem.

Mummu also occurs in one of the two variants of a list of deities described as "conquered Enlils" in an instruction for the preparation of a ritual drum. The name Enlil is not used as a theonym in this context, but rather as a title, similarly as in the cases of groups of deities referred to as "Enlils" in astronomical texts. The term "conquered Enlils" is likely to be connected to a tradition pertaining to Enmesharra and his seven sons. In the second variant of the list Papsukkal replaces Mummu, which according to Lambert likely reflects their shared role as the vizier of another deity.

== Mythology ==
=== Enūma Eliš ===
Mummu appears in the Enūma Eliš, though his role in this composition is minor. He is introduced as Apsu's vizier (sukkal). He partakes in a meeting between his master and Tiamat, and later advises him to destroy the younger gods who disturb his sleep. Selena Wisnom suggests that the scene is meant to highlight that Apsu is a bad ruler who possesses no wisdom of his own, and instead must rely on Mummu, in contrast with the epic's protagonist Marduk, whose wisdom is described as innate.

After Ea defeats Apsu, he also gains control over Mummu. He is subsequently described as held by him on a lead-rope (ṣerretu), a common metaphor referring to having control over another person. However, it is also possible that a literal lead-rope is meant, as it has been proposed that Mummu was imagined as a wild sheep rather than an anthropomorphic figure. Ea then imprisons Mummu in his dwelling. This episode is presumed to be an etiological explanation for Ea's well attested association with wisdom and skill. It is not known if an independent myth involving Ea and Mummu was in circulation earlier.

In addition to designating a separate character, mummu also occurs as a title of Tiamat in the Enūma Eliš. It is possible that this was influenced by the phonetic similarity to the word ummu, "mother", as the relevant passage describes her as the "begetter of them all" (mu’allidat gimrīšun). In early, now obsolete, translations it was erroneously assumed that Mummu is mentioned alongside Tiamat.

Mummu is also the thirty-fourth name bestowed upon Marduk in the final section of the composition. He is described as the creator of heaven and earth in the corresponding passage, which reflects the meaning of this title. It is possible that the next name listed, Zulummu, was selected based on phonetic similarity.

=== Other sources ===
References to Mummu's defeat are known from texts other than the Enūma Eliš as well, though they are uncommon. Wilfred G. Lambert pointed out that in lists of defeated gods from various rituals Mummu often occurs next to Qingu, and on this basis suggested that in a hitherto lost tradition they might have been vanquished together.

Mummu is also mentioned in Eudemus of Rhodes' account of Babylonian beliefs, preserved by the sixth century CE neoplatonist Damascius. Lambert assumed that it was based on an account related to the Enūma Eliš, though not identical with it. Eudemus wrote that a deity representing the "rational world", (Note: In 1916, relying in part on the relevant passage from Damascius' account and in part on lexical arguments (interpreting the term mummu a participle of amû, "to speak"), Frans de Liagre Böhl suggested defining Mummu a precursor of the Hellenistic idea of logos. However, this proposal was already rejected by Alexander Heidel in 1948, though he did note the association with creation makes Damscius' description of Mummu valid.) who he refers to as Mōymis, was a son of the primeval couple Apasōn (Apsu) and Tauthē (Tiamat). Enūma Eliš itself does not explain Mummu's origin or parentage. Manfred Krebernik assumes that Eudemus might have confused mummu treated as an epithet of Tiamat with the god Mummu, and as a result concluded that he was a son of the primordial couple. Vitali Bartash nonetheless assumes that Mummu is implicitly a son of Apsu in the Enūma Eliš as well.
