= Isimud =

Mesopotamian god

- Sukkal of Enki
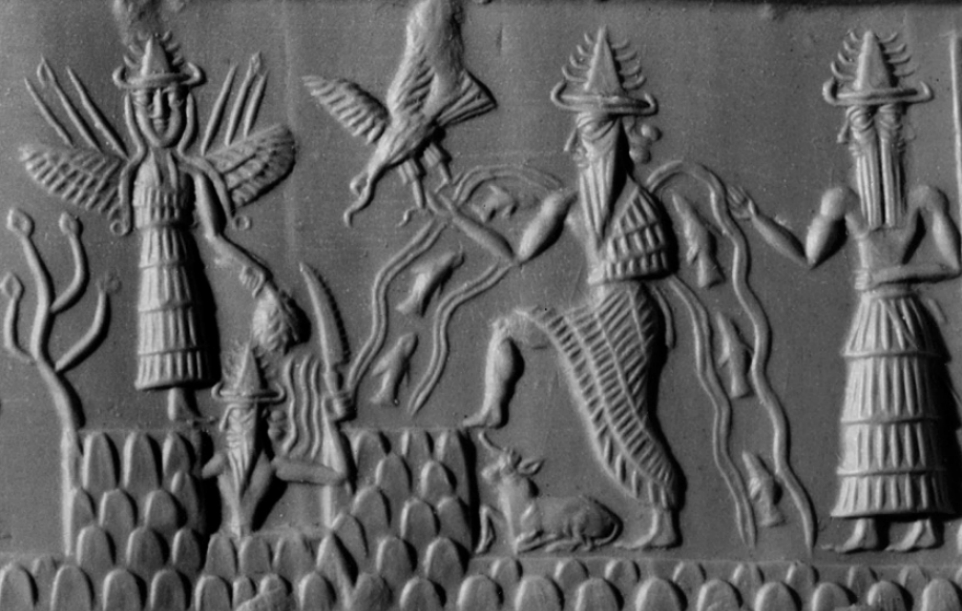
- A cylinder seal from the Akkadian Period depicting the deities Inanna, Utu, Enki, and Isimud, who is characteristically shown with two faces.
- Major cult center: Uruk

Isimud (also Isimu; Akkadian: Usmû; Hurrian: Izzummi) was a Mesopotamian god regarded as the divine attendant (sukkal) of the god Enki (Ea). He was depicted with two faces. No references to temples dedicated to him are known, though ritual texts indicate he was worshiped in Uruk and Babylon. He was also incorporated into Hurrian religion and Hittite religion. In myths, he appears in his traditional role as a servant of Enki.

== Name and character ==
Isimud (cuneiform: ^{d}PAP.SIG_{7}.NUN(.ME), ^{d}PAP.SIG_{7}.NUN.ME.EZEN✕KASKAL; glossed i-si-mu in An = Anum) was the sukkal (divine “attendant”) of the god Enki (Ea). He was also known under the Akkadian name Usmû. Wilfred G. Lambert has noted that the latter resembles the adjective usumia, “two-faced”, which was used in omen texts, and on this basis concluded that the theonym was understood similarly, presumably through a folk etymology. A Hurrian form of the name, Izzumi, is also attested. It was originally considered uncertain if the names Isimud and Ara (^{d}ŠA) were two separate deities It has been argued that the latter was only his variant name. However, according to Julia Krul, based on Old Babylonian texts written in the Emesal dialect it can be now concluded that this name originally designated a female deity, who later came to be conflated with Isimud, possibly due to the influence of similar developments pertaining to Ninshubur.

As a sukkal, Isimud was believed to act as an advisor, messenger and doorkeeper of his master. However, as noted by Frans Wiggermann, similarly as the sukkals of other major city gods (for example Alammuš or Nuska) he most likely did not originate as a personification of a specific sphere of influence of his master, in contrast with deities such as Nimgir, deified lightning regarded as the sukkal of Ishkur.

In art, Isimud was depicted as a figure with two faces, either standing alone or in introduction scenes with his master. While most sukkals can only be identified in art because of their badge of office, a staff, Isimud on the account of his two faces is an exception, and it has been noted that he does not always hold this attribute. His appearance has been compared to Roman Janus. Depictions are known from between the Akkadian and Kassite periods. According to Rainer Michael Boehmer, examples from the earliest period from which certain attestations are available are the most common. Examples are also known from outside Mesopotamia, from Syria and the Hittite Empire.

== Worship ==
Attestations of Isimud are available from between the Early Dynastic and Late Assyrian periods. However, no temples dedicated to him are mentioned in known texts.

In the first millennium BCE, Isimud received offerings in building rituals. He was also one of the deities belonging to the local pantheon of Uruk in the Seleucid period. It is not certain if he was already worshiped in this city in the Neo-Babylonian period, though this possibility is accepted by Julia Krul. According to Paul-Alain Beaulieu, the attestations are limited to two possible references in ritual texts, but the reading of the theonym is uncertain. He speculates that since no references to a separate sanctuary dedicated to him have been identified, he might have been worshiped in the Eanna complex like many other minor deities. Later on, a cella dedicated to him existed in the Bīt Rēš, a newly built temple dedicated to Anu and Antu. It was likely located near the main gate, but as there is no agreement which of the entrances fulfilled this role, two separate rooms discovered during excavations have been identified as Isimud’s dwelling, 48 and 79b (the latter alternatively assumed to be the cella of Kusu). He might have been regarded as one of the divine guards of the temple complex, alongside Nuska, Papsukkal and Pisangunug. While absent from legal texts and theophoric names, he is attested in ritual texts. He is mentioned for example in descriptions of the akītu ceremony. In this context, he forms a trio with Nuska and Papsukkal.

Either in the Neo-Babylonian period or later, Isimud was also worshiped in Babylon, and appears in a ritual text in which priests follow him to various temples. He is mentioned in a text describing a procession taking place on the fourth day of the month Kislīmu, which involved a slave riding on the back of a bull.

=== Hurrian and Hittite reception ===
Isimud was incorporated into the Hurrian pantheon as well. According to Alfonso Archi, he was received by the Hurrians from Mesopotamia alongside Ea and his wife Damkina. He was also among the Hurrian deities who were introduced to Hattusa. Hittites similarly worshiped him alongside Ea. A single theophoric name invoking him has been identified among the names of princes and officials of the Hittite Empire, in which only four other Hurrian deities, Ḫebat, Šarruma, Šauška and Teššub are otherwise attested. During the AN.TAḪ.ŠUM festival, he received offerings of meat and bread, as well as ritual libations.

== Mythology ==
In myths, Isimud acts as an attendant of Enki (Ea). He appears in the composition Inanna and Enki, where he informs his master that he handed over the me to the eponymous goddess while he was intoxicated, and subsequently acts as a messenger, telling Inanna to return the mes to Enki or face the consequences. He also appears in Enki and Ninhursag, where he navigates Enki's boat, acts as his messenger and emissary, and later cuts the plants Enki subsequently eats. Further myths he plays a role in include Enki’s Journey to Nippur, Ninurta and the Turtle, Enūma Eliš, and Atraḫasīs, where he is tasked with informing the eponymous protagonist about the fate which will befall the world. He also appears as Enki’s servant in the text The Heron and the Turtle. While similar to the so-called "debate poems" such as Sheep and Grain, it is instead presumed to be a fable, though the full restoration of the plot is not impossible. In Hurrian context he appears in the Song of LAMMA, where Ea instructs him to visit the eponymous deity because despite his newfound status as the “King in Heaven” (king of the gods) he did not hold any meetings of the divine assembly. He also instructs him to go to the “Dark Earth” (the underworld) to bring a message to the deities Nara and Napšara.
