= Kakka =

Mesopotamian deity

- Healing goddess, divine messenger
- Major cult center: Maškan-šarrum, Terqa
- Gender: female (in Upper Mesopotamia); male (in Babylonia; secondary development)

Kakka (𒀭𒂵𒂵; also romanized as Kaka or Gaga) was a Mesopotamian deity. She was originally worshiped across Upper Mesopotamia as a healing goddess, but later on came to be secondarily viewed as a male messenger god in Babylonia. Kakka's oldest attested cult center is Maškan-šarrum, located in the south of Assyria, though she was also worshiped in the kingdom of Mari, especially in Terqa. She appears in numerous theophoric names from this area, with Akkadian, Amorite and Hurrian examples attested. As early as in the Old Babylonian period she could be associated with Ninshubur, and later on with Papsukkal as well. However, she developed connection with Ninkarrak, Išḫara and possibly Nisaba as well. The male form of Kakka appears as a messenger of Anu in the Sultantepe version of the myth Nergal and Ereshkigal, and as a messenger of Anshar in Enūma Eliš.

== Name ==
A deity named ^{d}ga-ga is already attested in the Early Dynastic god list from Abu Salabikh. It is assumed that theophoric names with the element gag-ga or ga-ga, known from Old Akkadian Eshnunna and Gasur, refer to the same figure. The spelling ga-ga remained in use through the entire Old Akkadian period and in later times in Babylonia and Assyria, but additional variants are attested in texts from Mari and Terqa, including gag-ga, ka-ak-ka and ka-ka. Romanizations used in Assyriological literature include Kaka and Gaga. However, Piotr Steinkeller argues that the spellings with a double consonant indicate that Kakka is a more accurate representation of the original pronunciation, and points out the god list An = Anum provides the gloss ^{d}ga^{ka-ka}ga, indicating ^{d}ga-ga was pronounced as Kakka. This romanization is also considered preferable by Selena Wisnom.

The name of the god Kalkal is unrelated and he should not be confused with Kakka.

== Character ==
Kakka was regarded as a healing deity. It is presumed that this role is reflected in the theophoric name ga-ga-a-zu (from asû, "healer") which has been identified in a text from Tell Suleimah, an archeological site located in the proximity of the Diyala River, possibly corresponding to ancient Awal. It has been dated to the Old Akkadian period. Kakka was also regarded as a healing deity in Old Babylonian Mari. Furthermore, in the Old Babylonian forerunner of the god list An = Anum Kakka (^{d}ga-ga) appears in sequence with the medicine goddesses Gu_{2}-la_{2}, Ninisina and Ninkarrak. In a variant of a text referred to as The River Incatnation by Wilfred G. Lambert Kakka is one of the two deities who "perform the healing of mankind", the other being the eponymous deified river. (Note: It is presumed to be a supernatural subterranean watercourse leading to the Apsu, as opposed to a real river such as the Euphrates or the Tigris.) Copies are known only from the first millennium BCE.

Kakka could also function as a divine messenger, and is portrayed as a servant of Anu in the myth Nergal and Ereshkigal and Anshar in Enūma Eliš. However, according to Ryan D. Winters this role constituted a secondary development which occurred in lower Mesopotamia. He additionally points out that Mariote sources, as well as an Old Babylonian forerunner of An = Anum, confirm that Kakka was a goddess, while the messenger deity Kakka from later literary texts is male. He points out that the description of male Kakka in Enūma Eliš resembles male Ninshubur.

Icihiro Nakata suggests that a further aspect of Kakka's character might be implicitly attested in theophoric names from Mari with the element himṭu, "glowing of fire" or "glowing of fever", which otherwise occurs chiefly in connection with underworld deities such as Erra and Malik (though also Shamash and Adad). Winters additionally proposes that Kakka might have played a similar role to Išḫara and Nisaba in the same city.

== Associations with other deities ==
Kakka could be sometimes syncretised with Ninshubur, as already attested as in the Old Babylonian period. A hymn preserved on the tablet CBS 14073 compares Ninshubur (referred to with the feminine form of her name in the Emesal dialect, Gašanšubura) to Kakka. They are also identified with each other in the god list An = Anum (tablet I, line 31), where Kakka is explained as the name of Ninshubur as "vizier of Anu, who holds the exalted staff" (sukkal an-na-ke_{4} ^{giš}gidru maḫ šu du_{8}-a). However, they were not equated with each other in the Old Babylonian forerunner of this text yet. Ryan D. Winters suggests that the identification between Kakka and Ninshubur might have relied on the awareness that both names could simultaneously refer to a male and a female deity. In Mari, in addition to Ninshubur Kakka was also associated with Ninkarrak. In An = Anum (tablet V, line 146) and in a further god list the former is listed as one of the names of the latter.

In the first millennium BCE Kakka was eclipsed and largely absorbed by Papsukkal, similarly to Ninshubur and a further similar messenger deity, Ilabrat. In two versions of a single omen text, one associates the francolin with Kakka, but the other with Papsukkal. However, they were still worshiped separately from each other in Assur in the Neo-Assyrian period.

An association between Kakka and Išḫara is also attested. An = Anum (tablet I, line 288) might equate Kakka with Nisaba, if the interpretation of ^{d}DU_{3}.DU_{3} as ^{d}KAK.KAK, ^{d}kak-ka_{15} is to be accepted; according to Winters, this might either indicate that Išḫara's association with Kakka was transferred to Nisaba based on a connection between them attested elsewhere, or that the syllable kak was reinterpreted as a reference to a wedge of cuneiform (sag-kak, santakku), and thus a nod to the goddess of writing.

The nature of the connection between Kakka and the sukkal of Ningal, ^{d}ME^{kà-kà}ME, remains uncertain. Manfred Krebernik assumes that they were identical. This interpretation is also accepted as a possibility by Winters, though he notes she was otherwise not connected with Ningal. However, according to Dietz Otto Edzard, the sukkal of Ningal was most likely a distinct Gula-like medicine goddess, and the apparent association between her Kakka might be the result of confusion. Richard L. Litke argued that the gloss in the name ^{d}ME^{kà-kà}ME in An = Anum (tablet III, line 39) is unlikely to refer to an otherwise unknown reading of the sign ME, and assumes that the deity in mention was named Meme, with kà-kà being merely an indication that a possible alternate version of the list had Kakka in the same line, possibly due to both Meme and Kakka being equated with Ninkarrak elsewhere. He assumed that more than one deity named Kakka existed, with the medicine deity associated with Ninkarrak and the divine messenger associated with Ninshubur being distinct from each other. However, Ichiro Nakata, as well as Julia M. Asher-Greve, state that there was only one Kakka, associated both with Ninshubur and Ninkarrak.

== Worship ==
Kakka most likely was originally worshiped in the north of Mesopotamia, possibly as a member of the Amorite pantheon.

Maškan-šarrum was regarded as a cult center of Kakka, as indicated by a tablet from Puzrish-Dagan from the reign of Amar-Sin which mentions that it was the residence of a nin-dingir priestess of this deity. It might have been inhabited by Amorites at the time. Its precise location is uncertain, though it is agreed that it was located in the southernmost part of historical Assyria, close to the border with Babylonia; based on available evidence from administrative and geographical text, it has been proposed that it was located south of Assur, near the mouth of the Lower Zab, close to where Tigris enters the alluvium, or on the middle Tigris. Identification with Tell Meškin, located 47 kilometers to the northwest of Baghdad, has also been suggested. Due to the association between Kakka and Maškan-šarrum it has been proposed that Šū-Kakka, a king known from a seal impression found during excavations of Eshnunna and presumed to be a contemporary of Bilalama, ruled over this city. However, subsequent discoveries indicate that he was a king of Malgium instead.

Kakka appears in Akkadian and Amorite theophoric names, both feminine and masculine. Hurrian examples are also known, including Ḫazzip-Kakka from Mari and Ḫazi-Kakku from Tell Leilan. Other locations from which they are attested include Puzrish-Dagan, Ur, Lagash (in the Ur III period) and Nippur, Isin and various settlements in the Diyala basin. One of the sons of Ishbi-Erra bore the name Ishbi-Erra-naram-Kakka, "Ishbi-Erra is the beloved of Kakka". This choice might indicate that his father originated in Mari, as indicated by later literary texts, which refer to him as a "man of Mari". Terqa might have been the main cult center of Kakka in that area. Fifteen types of feminine theophoric names invoking Kakka have been identified in the Old Babylonian Mari text corpus. She is overall one of the seven goddesses most commonly invoked in them, the other six being Annu, Ishtar, Išḫara, Mami, Admu (a wife of Nergal) and Aya. Names of men invoking Kakka are also known, with eleven examples identified. Furthermore, later on one of the kings of the kingdom of Ḫana bore a name invoking this deity, Iddin-Kakka. However, much like Annu and Admu, Kakka is virtually absent from the Mari corpus save for theophoric names.

Kakka was also worshiped in Assur in the Neo-Assyrian period. According to Piotr Steinkeller this might either indicate spread of Kakka's cult from Maškan-šarrum to other cities in Assyria, or alternatively represent a late case of the influence of the culture on Mari on Assyria, well documented in the early second millennium BCE. However, according to Shana Zaia Kakka's cult was defunct by the time this deity was incorporated into the Neo-Assyrian pantheon. She suggests that he was selected based on his role as a messenger of Anshar in the Enūma Eliš, rather than due to earlier presence in Assyria. He was depicted on a relief on the gates of an akītu house constructed during the reign of Sennacherib as one of the deities assisting Ashur in a battle against Tiamat. (Note: According to Gina Konstantopoulos, the relief was a part of a broader ideological programme of reconfiguring elements borrowed from the Enūma Eliš to place Ashur, rather than Marduk, in a theologically prominent position. Textual sources indicate that numerous other deities were depicted on the relief, with Sharur, Shargaz, Kakka, Nuska, Mandanu, Tishpak, "Ninurta of the Wall", Kusu, Ḫaya, and the Sebitti placed in front of Ashur, and Mullissu, Šērūa, Sîn, Ningal, Shamash, Aya, Kippat-māti, Anu, Antu, Adad, Shala, Ea, Damkina, Bēlet-ilī and Ninurta behind him.)

== Mythology ==
Kakka, treated in this context as a male deity, acts as Anu's messenger in the Sultantepe version of the myth Nergal and Ereshkigal, but the god fulfilling the same role in the Amarna version is anonymous. He is only referred to as a "messenger" (mār šipri). Piotr Steinkeller argues that Kakka's presence in only one version of this myth might indicate that the assignment of a name to the god sent by Anu was an Assyrian addition. In the beginning of the composition, Kakka descends to the underworld on Anu's behalf to greet Ereshkigal and invite her to send a representative to the banquet held in heaven. He reappears in the end, when Anu tasks him with announcing Nergal's new position as the king of the underworld.

The male form of Kakka also appears in the Enūma Eliš. He serves Anshar as a vizier (sukkallum). He is sent by his master to tell his parents, Lahmu and Lahamu, that Tiamat is plotting against the gods. According to Steinkeller, it is uncertain why Kakka was included in this myth, as he was generally not worshiped in Babylonia, where it was composed. He tentatively proposes that identification between Anshar and Ashur might have been an older tradition than usually assumed, and that Kakka, who according to him might have been worshiped in at least some locations in Assyria, was selected as a deity who could plausibly be assigned to Ashur as a courtier. (Note: The equation of Anshar and Ashur is known from Neo-Assyrian fragments of a rewrite of Enūma Eliš which also casts Ashur as the protagonist, described by Wilfred G. Lambert as "completely superficial in that it leaves the plot in chaos by attributing Marduk's part to his great-grandfather, without making any attempt to iron out the resulting confusion." It is assumed that it was only written during the reign of Sennacherib.) However, according to Shana Zaia Kakka's presence in Assyria might have been inspired by his role in the Enūma Eliš, and a result of identifying Anshar with Ashur. A different explanation has been suggested by Selena Wisnom, who postulates that the passage might represent a literary allusion to the role of the personified weapon Šarur in myths about Ninurta, especially Lugal-e and the Epic of Anzû. She suggests that Kakka was selected because his name could be understood as a pun on the word kakku, "weapon", and thus indirectly as a reference to Šarur. However, she stresses that he shows less autonomy than Ninurta's personified weapon, as his role is limited to repeating the words of his master; she assumes that limiting the roles of minor deities reflected the need to highlight Marduk's power through the narrative at the expense of other figures.
