= Imhullu =

Imhullu is a divine wind weapon used by the sky god Marduk to savage the water goddess Tiamat in the Mesopotamian story of creation Enūma Eliš.

== See also ==
- Mesopotamian prayer
- Ancient Mesopotamian religion
- Atra-Hasis
- Ninlil
