= Ulmašītum =

Mesopotamian goddess

- Warrior goddess
- Major cult center: Ur, Malgium

Ulmašītum was a Mesopotamian goddess regarded as warlike. Her name was derived from (E-)Ulmaš, a temple in the city of Akkad dedicated to Ishtar. She was commonly associated with Annunitum, and in many texts they appear as a pair. While she originated in northern Mesopotamia, in the Ur III period she is best attested in Ur, though later she was also worshiped in Malgium.

== Name and character ==
The theonym Ulmašītum is derived from (E-)Ulmaš, the name of a temple of Ishtar located in the city of Akkad. Paul-Alain Beaulieu notes that similarly as in the cases of E-Meslam (the temple of Nergal in Kutha) and E-Šumeša (the temple of Ninurta in Nippur), the element Ulmaš is attested in theophoric names, though this might simply indicate that the temples themselves were viewed as divine, rather than that the cult of its attested divine resident was imposed over a different deity preserved in the name of the structure. The theophoric names of three children of Naram-Sin include the element Ulmaš: Ukin-ulmaš, Nabi-ulmaš and ME-ulmaš.

Other houses of worship bearing the name Eulmaš existed in Sippar and Uruk. The former was dedicated to Annunitum, and has to be distinguished from the E-edina, the temple of Ishtar in the same city. However, Jennie Myers points out that there are attestations of Ishtar and Ištar-Ulmašītum being worshiped there as well alongside the temple's primary goddess and Ninigizibara. The Urukean Eulmaš is attested in a text from the late first millennium BCE, according to which the deities worshiped in it were Ishtar and Anu.

Ulmašītum was regarded as a warlike deity. Her character has been described as Ishtar-like. She is described as a manifestation of this goddess or outright as a byname of her. Andrew R. George refers to her simply as "Ishtar of Akkad." However, Walther Sallaberger states that despite her origin she was worshiped as an independent deity. Tonia Sharlach remarks that the names Ishtar and Inanna might be best understood as umbrella terms, and following an earlier study of Gary Beckman suggests that deities commonly understood as local forms of her can be studied as distinct.

== Associations with other deities ==
Ulmašītum was commonly paired with a similar goddess, Annunitum. Frank Simons states that she never appears without her in texts from the Ur III period. They are also attested next to each other in the Old Babylonian Nippur god list. For uncertain reasons in all known exemplars Ulmašītum's name is written erroneously. Tonia Sharlach notes that while distinct from each other, she and Annunitum "appear like twin sisters." In some cases, they occur in a quartet alongside the pair Belet-Šuḫnir and Belet-Terraban. Sharlach suggests that all four shared origin in northern Mesopotamia.

In Malgium, Ulmašītum was associated with Ninshubur, who presumably fulfilled the role of a divine vizier (sukkal or sukkalmaḫ) in relation to her. She is primarily attested in the same function in relation to Inanna. Texts from the same city also mention two mythical lions believed to act as Ulmašītum's messengers, Dan-bītum and Rašub-bītum, whose statues apparently stood at the gate of her local temple.

== Worship ==
While according to an inscription of Nabonidus the (E-)Ulmaš in the city of Akkad already existed during the reign of Sargon, the oldest attestations of Ulmašītum come from the Ur III period. While she originated in northern Mesopotamia, she is best attested in texts from Ur, which according to Tonia Sharlach served as her cult center in the south. While in it is possible she was also worshiped commonly in the north, no detailed sources are available from the same period, and the fate of the city of Akkad and the E-Ulmaš temple are not certain.

In Ur Ulmašītum might have been worshiped alongside Annunitum in a palace chapel. She appears in the texts from the archive of queen Shulgi-simti. Some of them mention regular offerings (sá-dug_{4}) made to her to her and Annunitum. A festival dedicated to them both, referred to as erubbatum, was celebrated during the reign of Shulgi. A nabrium, a type of autumn festival, was held in their honor as well. In the same period, Ulmašītum was also worshiped in Uruk as a member of the entourage of Inanna, alongside deities such as Annunitum and Ninigizibara. Walther Sallaberger suggests that the introduction deities such as her, Nanaya or Kanisurra to the local pantheon might have been related to the presence of the queens from the reigning dynasty in the city.

Ulmašītum is mentioned in an Old Babylonian inscription of Takil-iliššu, a king of Malgium, a small kingdom located in Babylonia, to the east of the Tigris and to the south of Eshnunna. A temple dedicated to her bearing the ceremonial name Emaš existed there. Andrew R. George suggests that its name might be an erroneous writing of Eulmaš. Textual sources indicate that it had a courtyard in which various festivals focused on her and Ninshubur were held. She is also invoked in a curse formula of Takil-iliššu alongside Anu, Annunitum, Ninshubur and the lions Dan-bītum and Rašub-bītum to "cause bad omens" for anyone who removes his name from the foundation of the temple.
