= Ilabrat =

Mesopotamian god

- Divine attendant of Anu
- Major cult center: Assur

Ilabrat was a Mesopotamian god who in some cases was regarded as the sukkal (attendant deity) of the sky god Anu. Evidence from the Old Assyrian period indicates that he could also be worshiped as an independent deity.

== Name ==
Multiple etymologies have been proposed for Ilabrat's name, including "god of (the land/city) Iabrat" (suggested by Ignace Gelb) and "tutelary god of the simple people"(suggested by Thorkild Jacobsen), but none are universally accepted, and it is not certain that it came from a Semitic language as presumed in these two proposals. Some late lexical lists connect the element -labr with the Sumerian word labar, "servant", treated as a synonym of sukkal in this context, which lead Frans Wiggermann to propose that Ilabrat's name was Sumerian in origin, and that the hypothetical older form of the name might have been Nin-labrat. In most cases due to Akkadian grammar it is possible to determine with certainty that Ilabrat was considered a male deity, but as argued by Grégoire Nicolet, the occasional alteration between the base form of the name and the variant Ialbra can be compared to the cases of Kubabat/Kubaba and Ḫebat/Ḫeba where the optional t was a feminine suffix, which according to him would indicate that this deity was perceived as female at least in the northwest of Mesopotamia in the Old Babylonian period.

=== Ilabrat and Ninshubur ===
A gloss in the god list An = Anum might indicate that Ninshubur's name could be used as a logographic representation of Ilabrat's. Frans Wiggermann proposes that many examples of such use are present in Akkadian texts from the second millennium BCE which appear to treat Ninshubur as a masculine deity. He points out that in texts from the third millennium BCE, Ninshubur's gender is invariably female if it is specified, even in an Akkadian royal inscription. The view that male Ninshubur in Akkadian texts should be understood as Ilabrat is also supported by Joan Goodnick Westenholz, while Paul-Alain Beaulieu accepts that at least in personal names from Mari, Ninshubur should be read as Ilabrat. Most likely in the late third millennium Ilabrat (either analogous to or identical with the male Ninshubur) and Ninshubur coexisted, though sources from the Old Babylonian period at times already equate them. In the first millennium BCE both of them, as well as another similar deity, Kakka, were eventually overshadowed by Papsukkal.

== Character ==
Ilabrat was sometimes regarded as the sukkal (divine attendant and messenger) of Anu. In the myth of Adapa, he acts as the source of information about events taking place on earth for his master. Similar to Ninshubur, he could also function as the sukkal of the divine assembly. However, there is no indication that Ilabrat was regarded as the sukkal of any other deity in Old Assyrian documents, where he appears to function independently.

In the role of a family god, Ilabrat could be asked to act as a divine arbiter in personal conflicts or as a witness, in at least one case alongside ghosts of ancestors.

The constellation Orion, known in ancient Mesopotamia as Sipazianna, "the true shepherd of heaven", was regarded as the astral symbol of Ilabrat, as well as Ninshubur and Papsukkal.

A bird possibly named after Ilabrat, illabara^{mušen}, which according to Mesopotamian texts lived in mountainous environments, was associated with Nergal.

== Worship ==
There is evidence both from Babylonia and Assyria for the worship of Ilabrat as a family god in the private sphere. For instance, a certain Ibbi-Ilabrat from Malgium called himself "servant of Ilabrat and Ušmu", while on one Old Babylonian letter, Ilabrat is implored for help alongside Ninsianna. Many attestations are also known from Old Assyrian sources. A document from Kanesh, an Old Assyrian trading colony in Anatolia, mentions that a golden sun disc was supposed to be manufactured in this city and delivered to Assur as a votive offering for Ilabrat.

Due to the possibility that Ninshubur's name was used as a logogram to represent Ilabrat's, in some cases it can be difficult to tell which of these two deities was meant, and as a result it is uncertain in which cities where a deity referred to as Ninshubur was worshiped in the Old Babylonian period were cult centers of Ilabrat. Such locations include Larsa, Malgium, Mari, Nerebtum and, in later periods, Kish and Babylon as well. Additionally a town named after Ilabrat existed in the proximity of Nuzi.

There is some evidence that, even though Papsukkal became the dominant messenger deity in the first millennium BCE, Ilabrat was still worshiped in Assur, and in either Babylon or Borsippa.

Multiple theophoric names invoking Ilabrat are known, for example Ibbi-Ilabrat, Ilabrat-bani, Ilabrat-dunni, Šu-Ilabrat and Šat-Ilabra (the spelling without a t is known from Mari). In Sippar Ilabrat is well attested in personal names, but apparently had no formal cult in that city.

=== Outside Mesopotamia ===
Ilabrat is apparently attested in a single incantation from Ugarit, KTU 1.128, in which he acts as the messenger of the local god El.

In the so-called babilili ritual, written in Akkadian but known only from a corpus of Hurro-Hittite texts from Hattusa, Ilabrat appears as the sukkal of Pinikir, in this context identified with Ishtar, though addressed as an "Elamite goddess."

== Mythology ==
Ilabrat appears as a servant of Anu in the myth of Adapa, where he explains to his master that the eponymous protagonist is a mortal man responsible for breaking a wing of the personified South Wind, who was unable to blow for seven days as a result.
