= Enūma Eliš =

Babylonian creation myth

Enūma Eliš (Akkadian Cuneiform: 𒂊𒉡𒈠𒂊𒇺, also spelled "Enuma Elish"), meaning "When on High", is a Babylonian creation myth (named after its opening words) from the late 2nd millennium BCE and the only complete surviving account of ancient near eastern cosmology. It was recovered by English archaeologist Austen Henry Layard in 1849 (in fragmentary form) in the ruined Library of Ashurbanipal at Nineveh (Mosul, Iraq). A form of the myth was first published by English Assyriologist George Smith in 1876; active research and further excavations led to near completion of the texts and improved translation.

Enūma Eliš has about a thousand lines and is recorded in Akkadian on seven clay tablets, each holding between 115 and 170 lines of Sumero-Akkadian cuneiform script. Most of Tablet V has never been recovered, but, aside from this lacuna, the text is almost complete.

Over the seven tablets, it describes the creation of the world, a battle between gods focused on the offering to Marduk, the creation of man destined for the service of the Mesopotamian deities, and it ends with a long passage praising Marduk. The rise of Marduk is generally viewed to have started from the Second Dynasty of Isin, triggered by the return of the statue of Marduk from Elam by Nebuchadnezzar I, although a late Kassite date is also sometimes proposed. It may have been recited during the Akitu festival.

Some late Assyrian versions replace Marduk with Ashur.

== Background and discovery ==
Before the tablets were discovered, substantial elements of the myth had survived via the writings of Berossus (primarily his Babyloniaca), a 3rd-century BCE Babylonian writer and priest of Bel (Marduk). These were preserved in Alexander Polyhistor's book on Chaldean History, which was reproduced by Eusebius in Book 1 of his Chronicon. In it are described the primeval state of an abyssal darkness and water, the two primeval beings existing therein, said to be of a twofold principle. The description then relates the creation of further beings, partly human but with variants of wings, animal heads and bodies, and some with both sex organs. (Berossus states images of these are to be found at the temple of Bel in Babylon.) The text also describes a female being leading over them, named as Omoroca, called Thalatth in Babylonian (derived from Greek), and her slaying by Bel, who cut her in half, forming Heaven of one part and Earth of the other. This Berossus claims to have been an allegory. The text also describes the beheading of a god, and the mixing of the god's blood with the Earth's soil, leading to the creation of men (people). Finally, there is also reference to Bel's creation of the stars, Sun, Moon, and planets. Berossus also gave an account of the sage Oannes, a sort of fish-man hybrid, who appeared from the sea and taught people all manner of knowledge, including writing, lawmaking, construction, mathematics, and agriculture; Berossus presented the account of creation in the form of a speech given by the Oannes. The neo-Platonist Damascius also gave a short version of the Babylonian cosmological view, which closely matches Enūma Eliš.

Clay tablets containing inscriptions relating to analogues of biblical stories were discovered by A. H. Layard, Hormuzd Rassam, and George Smith in the ruins of the Palace and Library of Ashurbanipal (668–626 BCE) during excavations at the mound of Kuyunjik, Nineveh (near Mosul) between 1848 and 1876. Smith worked through Rassam's find of around 20,000 fragments from 1852, and identified references to the kings Shalmaneser II, Tiglath-Pileser III, Sargon II, Sennacherib, Esarhaddon, and other rulers mentioned in the Bible. Furthermore, he discovered versions of a Babylonian deluge myth (see Gilgamesh flood myth), as well as creation myths.

On examination it became clear that the Assyrian myths were drawn from or similar to the Babylonian ones. Additionally Sir Henry Rawlinson had noted similarities between Biblical accounts of creation and the geography of Babylonia. He suggested that biblical creation stories might have their origin in that area. A link was found on a tablet labelled K 63 at the British Museum's collection by Smith, as well as similar text on other tablets. Smith then began searching the collection for textual similarities between the two myths, and found several references to a deluge myth with an 'Izdubar' (literal translation of cuneiform for Gilgamesh). Smith's publication of his work led to an expedition to Assyria funded by The Daily Telegraph. There he found further tablets describing the deluge as well as fragmentary accounts of creation, a text on a war between good and evil 'gods', and a fall of man myth. A second expedition by Smith brought back further creation legend fragments. By 1875 he had returned and began publishing accounts of these discoveries in the Daily Telegraph from 4 March 1875.

Smith speculated that the creation myth, including a part describing the fall of man, might originally have spanned at least nine or ten tablets. He also identified tablets the themes of which were, in part, closer to the account given by Berossus. Some of Smith's early correspondences, such as references to the stories of the temptation of Eve, to the Tower of Babel, and to instructions given from God (Yahweh) to Adam and Eve, were later held to be erroneous.

The connection with the Bible stories brought a great deal of additional attention to the tablets, in addition to Smith's early scholarship on the tablets, early translation work included that done by E. Schrader, A. H. Sayce, and Jules Oppert. In 1890 P. Jensen published a translation and commentary Die Kosmologie der Babylonier (Jensen 1890), followed by an updated translation in his 1900 Mythen und Epen (Jensen 1900); in 1895 Prof. Zimmern of Leipzig gave a translation of all known fragments, (Gunkel & Zimmern 1895), shortly followed by a translation by Friedrich Delitzsch, as well as contributions by several other authors.

In 1898, the trustees of the British Museum ordered publication of a collection of all the Assyrian and Babylonian creation texts held by them, a work which was undertaken by L. W. King. King concluded that the creation myth as known in Nineveh was originally contained on seven tablets. This collection was published 1901 as Part XIII of Cuneiform Texts from Babylonian Tablets in the British Museum (British Museum 1901). King published his own translations and notes in two volumes with additional material 1902 as The Seven Tablets of Creation, or the Babylonian and Assyrian Legends concerning the creation of the world and of mankind (King 1902). By then additional fragments of tablet six had been found, concerning the creation of man; here Marduk was found to have made man from his blood combined with bone, which brought comparison with Genesis 2:23 ("This is now bone of my bones and flesh of my flesh; she shall be called 'woman', for she was taken out of man") where the creation of woman required the use of a man's bone.

New material contributing to the fourth and sixth tablets also further corroborated other elements of Berossus' account. The seventh tablet added by King was a praise of Marduk, using around fifty titles over more than one hundred lines of cuneiform. Thus King's composition of Enūma Eliš consisted of five parts: the birth of gods, legend of Ea and Apsu, Tiamat primeval serpent myth, account of creation, and finally a hymn to Marduk using his many titles. Importantly, tablets, both Assyrian and Babylonian, when possessing colophons had the number of the tablet inscribed.

Further expeditions by German researchers uncovered further tablet fragments (specifically tablet 1, 6, and 7) during the period 1902–1914. These works replaced Marduk with the Assyrian god Ashur; additional important sources for tablets 1 and 6, and tablet 7 were discovered by expeditions in 1924–25 and 1928–29 respectively. The Ashur texts uncovered by the Germans necessitated some corrections: it was Kingu, not Marduk, who was killed and whose blood made men. These discoveries were further supplemented by purchases from antiquity dealers. As a result, by the mid 20th century most of the text of the work was known, with the exception of tablet 5. These further discoveries were complemented by a stream of publications and translations in the early 20th century.

In the 21st century, the text remains a subject of active research, analysis, and discussion. Significant publications include: The Standard Babylonian Creation Myth Enūma Eliš (Talon 2005); Das Babylonische Weltschöpfungsepos Enuma Elis (Kämmerer & Metzler 2012); Babylonian Creation Myths (Lambert 2013); enūma eliš: Weg zu einer globalen Weltordnung (Gabriel 2014); and other works still.

=== Date ===
The earliest manuscript of the myth was excavated from Assur and dated to the 9th century BCE, though may have been recited as part of oral tradition prior to this date.

While it used to be viewed that Enuma Elish was composed in the reign of Hammurabi, most scholars now believe it is unlikely and accept a dating to the Second Dynasty of Isin. During the Old Babylonian period, Marduk was not the pantheon head, appearing instead as the mediator between the great gods and Hammurabi, and there is no evidence that Hammurabi or his successors promoted Marduk at the expense of the other gods. It was during the Second Dynasty of Isin that Marduk started to be referred to as the king of the gods, with the return of the statue of Marduk from Elam by Nebuchadnezzar I. Sommerfield's suggestion that Enuma Elish should be dated instead to the Kassite period, was countered by Lambert, but the god list An = Anum does give the number 50, which traditionally belongs to Enlil, to Marduk. Dalley still proposes that Enuma Elish was written during the Old Babylonian Period, but other scholars find her proposal unlikely.

=== Variants ===
Numerous copies of the tablets exist. Even by 1902 fragments of four copies of the first tablet were known, as well as extracts, possibly examples of 'handwriting practice'. Tablets from the library of Ashur-bani-pal tended to be well written on fine clay, whereas the Neo-Babylonian tablets were often less well written and made, though fine examples existed. All tablets, both Assyrian and Babylonian had the text in lines, not columns, and the form of the text was generally identical between both.

A tablet at the British Museum (No 93014), known as the "bilingual" version of the creation legend, describes the creation of man and animals (by Marduk with the aid of Aruru), as well as the creation of the rivers Tigris and Euphrates, of land and plants, as well as the first houses and cities.

Other variants of the creation myth can be found described in King 1902, pp. 116–55 and Heidel 1951, pp. 61–81.

== Text ==
The epic itself does not rhyme, and has no meter; it is composed of couplets, usually written on the same line, occasionally forming quatrains. The title Enūma Eliš, meaning "when on high", is the incipit.

The following per-tablet summary is based on the translation in Akkadian Myths and Epics (E. A. Speiser), in Ancient Near Eastern Texts Relating to the Old Testament (Pritchard 1969).

=== Tablet 1 ===
When on high the heaven had not been named,
Firm ground below had not been called by name,
Naught but primordial Apsu, their begetter,
(And) Mummu*–Tiamat, she who bore them all, Their waters commingling as a single body;
No reed hut had been matted, no marsh land had appeared,
When no gods whatever had been brought into being,
Uncalled by name, their destinies undetermined—
Then it was that the gods were formed within them.

— First eight lines of Enuma Elis. Pritchard 1969, pp. 60–61
* Here Mummu is not an epithet, same as the god Mummu.

The narrative begins before creation, when only the primordial entities Apsu and Tiamat existed, co-mingled together. There were no other things or gods, nor had any destinies been foretold. Then from the mixture of Apsu and Tiamat two gods issued – Lahmu and Lahamu; next Anshar and Kishar were created. From Anshar came firstly the god Anu, and from Anu, came Nudimmud (also known as Ea).

The commotion of these new gods disturbed and disgusted Apsu, and Apsu could not calm them. Apsu called Mummu to speak with Tiamat, and he proposed to destroy the new gods, but Tiamat was reluctant to destroy what they had made. Mummu advised Apsu to destroy them, and he embraced Mummu. The new gods heard of this and were worried; Ea, however, crafted a spell to lull Apsu to sleep.

Mummu sought to wake Apsu but could not. Ea took Apsu's halo and wore it himself, slew Apsu, and chained Mummu. Apsu became the dwelling place of Ea, together with his wife Damkina. Within the heart of Apsu, Ea and Damkina created Marduk. The splendor of Marduk exceeded Ea and the other gods, and Ea called him "My son, the Sun!" Anu created the four winds.

Other gods taunted Tiamat: "When your consort (Apsu) was slain you did nothing", and complained of the wearisome wind. Tiamat then made monsters to battle the other gods, eleven chimeric creatures with weapons, with the god Kingu chief of the war party and her new consort. She gave Kingu the 'Tablet of Destinies', making his command unchallengeable.

=== Tablet 2 ===
Ea heard of Tiamat's plan to fight and avenge Apsu. He spoke to his grandfather Anshar, telling that many gods had gone to Tiamat's cause, and that she had created eleven monstrous creatures fit for war, and made Kingu their leader, wielding the 'Tablet of Destinies'. Anshar was troubled and told Anu to go to appease Tiamat, but he was too weak to face her and turned back. Anshar became more worried, thinking no god could resist Tiamat.

Finally, Anshar proposed Marduk as their champion. Marduk was brought forth, and asked what god he must fight – to which Anshar replied that it was not a god but the goddess Tiamat. Marduk confidently predicted his victory, but exacted their promise to proclaim him supreme god, with authority over even Anshar.

=== Tablet 3 ===
Anshar spoke to Gaga, who advised him to fetch Lahmu and Lahamu and tell them of Tiamat's war plans, and of Marduk's demand for overlordship if he defeats her. Lahmu and Lahamu and other Igigi (heavenly gods) were distressed, but drank together, becoming drowsy, and finally approving the compact with Marduk.

=== Tablet 4 ===
Marduk was given a throne, and sat over the other gods, who honored him.

Lord, truly thy decree is first among gods.
Say but to wreck or create; it shall be.
Open thy mouth: the Images will vanish!
Speak again, and the Images shall be whole!

— (Other gods speak to Marduk) Translation, Table IV. Lines 20–23. Pritchard 1969, p. 66

Marduk was also given a sceptre and vestments, as well as weapons to fight Tiamat – bow, quiver, mace, and bolts of lightning, together with the four winds. His body was aflame.

Using the four winds Marduk trapped Tiamat. Adding a whirlwind, a cyclone, and Imhullu ("the Evil Wind"), together the seven winds stirred up Tiamat. In his war chariot drawn by four creatures he advanced. He challenged Tiamat, stating she had unrightfully made Kingu her consort, accusing her of being the source of the trouble. Enraged, Tiamat joined Marduk in single combat.

Marduk used a net, a gift from Anu, to entangle Tiamat; Tiamat attempted to swallow Marduk, but 'the Evil Wind' filled her mouth. With the winds swirling within her she became distended. Marduk then shot his arrow, hitting her heart – she was slain. The other gods attempted to flee but Marduk captured them, broke their weapons, and netted them. Her eleven monsters were also captured and chained, whilst Kingu was imprisoned, and the 'Tablet of Destinies' taken from him. Marduk then smashed Tiamat's head with the mace, while her blood was carried off by the North Wind.

Marduk then split Tiamat's remains in two. From one half he made the sky; in it he made places for Anu, Enlil, and Ea.

=== Tablet 5 ===
Marduk made likenesses of the gods in the constellations, and defined the days of the year from them. He created night and day, and the moon also. He created clouds and rain, and their water made the Tigris and Euphrates. He gave the 'Tablet of Destinies' to Anu.

Statues of the eleven monsters of Tiamat were made and installed at the gate of Apsu.

=== Tablet 6 ===
Marduk then spoke to Ea, saying he would use his own blood to create man, and that man would serve the gods. Ea advised one of the gods be chosen as a sacrifice; the Igigi advised that Kingu be chosen. His blood was then used to create man.

Construct Babylon, whose building you have requested,
Let its brickwork be fashioned. You shall name it 'The Sanctuary'.

— (Marduk commands the other gods, the Anunnaki)
Translation, Table VI. Lines 57–58. Pritchard 1969, p. 68

Marduk then divided the gods into "above" and "below" – three hundred in the heavens, six hundred on earth. The gods then proposed to build a throne or shrine for him; Marduk told them to construct Babylon. The gods then spent a year making bricks; they built the Esagila (Temple to Marduk) to a great height, making it a place for Marduk, Ea, and Enlil.

A banquet was then held, with fifty of the great gods taking seats, Anu praising Enlil's bow and then Marduk.

The first nine names or titles of Marduk were given.

=== Tablet 7 ===
The remainder of Marduk's fifty names or titles were read.

=== Colophon ===
Tablets Smith examined also contained attributions on the rear of the tablet. The first tablet contained eight lines of a colophon. Smith's reconstruction and translation of this states:

"When Above"
Palace of Assurbanipal king of nations, king of Assyria
to whom Nebo and Tasmit attentive ears have given:
he sought with diligent eyes the wisdom of the inscribed tablets,
which among the kings who went before me,
none those writings had sought.
The wisdom of Nebo; † the impressions? of the god instructor? all delightful,
on tablets I wrote, I studied, I observed, and
for the inspection of my people within my palace I placed

— (Smith 1876, pp. 63–64)
† Nebo was god of literacy, scribes, and wisdom; Tasmit or Tasmetu his wife

== Significance, interpretation, and ritual use ==
Due to the nature of Enuma Elish, it may not be representative of Mesopotamian creation myths. Enuma Elish references multiple myths and other texts, and epithets usually attested in royal inscriptions were given to Marduk. Similarities with the Anzû myth are commonly observed, such as both myths using the Tablet of Destinies as a key object and the similarities between the weapons used by Ninurta and Marduk, and lines from the Anzu myth were adapted to fit the story of Enuma Elish, such as Anzu's feathers being blown off by the wind being adjusted to having Tiamat's blood being blown off by the wind. Marduk using floods and storms as a weapon and using a net to capture Tiamat (the personified sea) does not make logical sense, but they were weapons that Ninurta used in the Anzu myth and in Lugal-e, and usage of a net would make sense against Anzu. Other traditions related to Ninurta were also applied to Marduk in Enuma Elish, such as the name of one of Ninurta's weapons (long wood) being given to Marduk’s bow. While it would make sense to simply write this off as Marduk using Ninurta's model simply because it was the closest match, the traditions involving Ninurta were already used to allude to heroism in the epic of Gilgamesh, and imageries of Ninurta played an important part of Neo-Assyrian ideology.

Outside of the Anzu myth, similarities between Enuma Elish and the Atrahasis epic were also pointed out. Both Apsu and Enlil wanted to destroy a source of noise which prevented them from falling asleep (for Enlil, this was humanity and for Apsu, this was his offspring). Both Nintu and Tiamat then lament their fate. Wisnom further suggests that the similarities between the beginning of Enuma Elish and Atrahasis was to have Apsu remind people of Enlil, thus the overthrowing of Apsu symbolically represents the dethronement of Enlil, the old head of the pantheon. Enlil is conspicuously missing in most of Enuma Elish, only appearing to offer his title to Marduk, and Marduk receives fifty names, the number of Enlil.

Other comparisons were also drawn, such as the description of Marduk's awe with the description in Marduk's Address to the Demons, and the creation of the universe at the beginning of Tablet X with Tablet XXII of the astronomical series Enuma Anu Enlil. In Enuma Anu Enlil, the creation of the universe was credited to Anu, Enlil and Ea, while in Enuma Elish the creation of the universe was credited to Marduk while Enlil and Ea were assigned a position.

The myth of a god (usually a storm god) fighting the sea is well known in the Ancient Near East, including myths such as the Song of Hedammu, the Baal cycle, the Illuyanka myth, and the Astarte papyrus. In the Song of Hedammu and the Illuyanka Myth the sea acts as a sort of breeding ground for the god's enemies, as both Hedammu and Illuyanka were sea monsters. The Song of the Sea, suggested to belong to the Kumarbi Cycle, likely narrates the story of the storm god Teshub fighting the sea god, although the text is damaged and fragmentary. The Astarte Papyrus also mentioned a struggle with the sea, and the Ugaritic Baal Cycle had Baal Hadad fight for his position from Yam.

A ritual text from the Seleucid period states that Enūma Eliš was recited during the Akitu festival. There is scholarly debate as to whether this reading occurred, its purpose, and even the identity of the text referred to. Most analysts consider that the festival concerned and included some form of re-enactment of Tiamat's defeat by Marduk, representing a renewal cycle and triumph over chaos. However an analysis by Jonathan Z. Smith led him to argue that the ritual should be understood in terms of its post-Assyrian and post-Babylonian imperial context, and may include elements of psychological and political theater legitimizing the non-native Seleucid rulers; he also questions whether Enūma Eliš read during that period was the same as that known to the ancient Assyrians. Whether Enūma Eliš creation myth was created for the Akitu ritual, or vice versa, or neither, is unclear; nevertheless there are definite connections in subject matter between the myth and festival, and there is also evidence of the festival as celebrated during the neo-Babylonian period that correlates well with Enūma Eliš myth. A version of Enūma Eliš is also thought to have been read during the month of Kislimu.

It has been suggested that ritual reading of the poem coincided with spring flooding of the Tigris or Euphrates following the melting of snow in mountainous regions upstream. This interpretation is supported by the defeat of the (watery being) Tiamat by Marduk.

== Influence on the Old Testament ==
Enūma Eliš contains numerous similarities to the Old Testament, which has led researchers to conclude that the Old Testament was based on previous Mesopotamian work. Overarching similarities include: reference to a watery chaos before creation; a separation of the chaos into heaven and earth; different types of waters and their separation; and the numerical similarity between the seven tablets of the epic and the seven days of creation. However, another analysis (Heidel 1951) notes many differences, including polytheism vs. monotheism, and personification of forces and qualities in the Babylonian myth vs. imperative creation by God in the biblical stories; permanence of matter vs. creation out of nothing; and the lack of any real parallel for Marduk's long battles with monsters. He also notes some broad commonalities of both texts with other religions, such as a watery chaos found in Egyptian, Phoenician, and Vedic works; and that both texts were written in languages with a common Semitic root. Regarding the creation of man, there are similarities in the use of dust or clay, but man's efficiency is inverted in the two texts: in Enūma Eliš they are created as already qualifying as acting as servant of gods, whereas in Genesis, by being given more agency, room for failure is introduced. Nevertheless in both, the dust is infused with "godhood", either through a god's blood in Enūma Eliš, or by being made in God's image in Genesis. As to the seven tablets and seven days of each system, the numbered itineraries in general do not closely match, but there are some commonalities in order of the creation events: first darkness, then light, the firmament, dry land, and finally man, followed by a period of rest.

Different theories have been proposed to explain these parallels. Based on an analysis of proper names in the texts, A. T. Clay proposed that Enūma Eliš was a combination of a Semitic myth from Amurru and a Sumerian myth from Eridu. This theory is thought to lack historical or archaeological evidence. An alternative theory posits a westward spread of the Mesopotamian myth to other cultures such as the Hebrews; additionally, the Hebrews would have been influenced by Mesopotamian culture during their Babylonian captivity. A third explanation supposes a common ancestor for both religions.

Conrad Hyers of the Princeton Theological Seminary suggests that Genesis, rather than repurposing earlier creation myths, polemically addressed them to "repudiate the divinization of nature and the attendant myths of divine origins, divine conflict, and divine ascent". According to this hypothesis, Enūma Eliš elaborated the interconnections between the divine and inert matter, while the aim of Genesis was to state the supremacy of Yahweh over all other natural and supernatural beings.

Part of the broken Enūma Eliš tablet seems to refer to a concept of sabbath. A contextual restoration contains the rarely attested Sapattu^{m} or Sabattu^{m} as the full moon, cognate or merged with Hebrew Shabbat (cf. Genesis 2:2–3), but monthly rather than weekly; it is regarded as a form of Sumerian sa-bat ("mid-rest"), attested in Akkadian as um nuh libbi ("day of mid-repose"). The reconstructed text reads: "[Sa]bbath shalt thou then encounter, mid[month]ly."

The 'Ain Samiya goblet, found in a tomb near modern Ramallah, is believed to depict scenes similar to Enūma Eliš and illustrates a clear influence from Mesopotamia on Canaan during the Middle Bronze Age. The depictions of a double headed god and the creation of the world from a dragon provide the earliest evidence of the epic's composition.

== Editions and translations ==
English:

- Lambert, Wilfred. Babylonian Creation Myths, Eisenbrauns, 2013.
- Helle, Sophus. Enuma Elish: The Babylonian Epic of Creation, Bloomsbury, 2024.
- Dalley, Stephanie. Myths from Mesopotamia: Creation, the Flood, Gilgamesh, and Others, Oxford University Press, 2000.
  (as The Epic of Creation)

German:

- Kammerer TR, Metzler KA. Das babylonische Weltschopfungsepos Enuma elîsh, Ugarit-Verlag, Münster, 2012.

French:

- Talon P. The standard Babylonian creation myth Enuma Elish, 2005.

== See also ==
- Mesopotamian pantheon
- Religions of the ancient Near East
- Eridu Genesis
