= Papsukkal =

Mesopotamian god

- Messenger god
- Major cult center: Kish, later Uruk
- Symbol: staff, walking bird

Genealogy
- Parents: Zababa, Anu or Enmesharra (father)
- Spouse: Amasagnudi
- Children: Pappap, Hedu, Ninhedu, Ninkita, Mišaga

Papsukkal (𒀭𒉽𒈛) was a Mesopotamian god regarded as the sukkal (attendant deity) of Anu and his wife Antu in Seleucid Uruk. In earlier periods he was instead associated with Zababa. He acquired his new role through syncretism with Ninshubur.

== Character ==
Papsukkal was originally the sukkal (attendant and messenger deity) of Zababa, the tutelary god of Kish. His name is a combination of the Sumerian words pap, "older brother," and sukkal. Papsukkal's eventual rise to prominence at the expense of other similar figures, such as Ninshubur, as well as Kakka and Ilabrat, was likely rooted simply in the presence of the word sukkal in his name. In the context of the so-called "antiquarian theology" relying largely on god lists, which developed in Uruk under Achaemenid and Seleucid rule, he was fully identified with Ninshubur and thus became Anu's sukkal and one of the eighteen major deities of the city. In the Seleucid period he was regarded as the sukkal of both Anu and Antu. Papsukkal was also a protector of the parakku, the seat of Anu.

While Papsukkal could be depicted as a deity holding a staff, a typical attribute of a sukkal, he also had an individual symbol, a walking bird. He was represented by it on kudurru (inscribed boundary stones). An omen text associates him with the francolin (Akkadian: ittidû), though a variant instead has the name of the god Kakka in place of Papsukkal. The constellation Orion, known in ancient Mesopotamia as Sipazianna, "the true shepherd of heaven," was regarded as the astral symbol of Papsukkal, as well as Ninshubur and Ilabrat.

== Associations with other deities ==
Frans Wiggermann proposes that Papsukkal was initially viewed as the son of Zababa. In late sources, his father was Anu. A prayer to Papsukkal additionally calls him "offspring of Enmesharra," possibly indicating that a tradition in which Enmesharra was an ancestor of Anu existed. In one case, Papsukkal is listed right behind Enmesharra in a list of vanquished gods. In another similar list, he was equated with Mummu, according to Wilfred G. Lambert most likely based on their shared status as divine viziers (sukkals).

Papsukkal's wife was the sparsely attested goddess Amasagnudi. Three possibilities have been proposed regarding her origin: that she was the original sukkal of Anu, replaced in this role by Inanna's sukkal Ninshubur; that she was an epithet of Ninshubur; or that she was the wife of the male form of Ninshubur. References to Amasagnudi from before the Seleucid period are incredibly rare, and according to Paul-Alain Beaulieu as of 1992 known examples were limited to the god list An = Anum and a single lexical text. More recent research revealed a further occurrence of Amasagnudi in the second millennium BCE in an Akkadian incantation against Lamashtu known from a copy from Ugarit, in which she appears alongside Papsukkal.

The god lists An = Anum in a section dedicated to Papsukkal lists five daughters: Pappap, Hedu, Ninhedu, Ninkita and Mišaga. PAP.PAP, written without a "divine determinative" sign, is first attested as a name or title of queen Baranamtara, wife of Lugalanda, and it is not impossible that the name of the daughter of Papsukkal was derived from it. The primary meaning of the name Hedu and the element hedu in Ninhedu was "may it befit," but it was later reinterpreted as a homophonous word meaning "architrave," possibly because the alternate name of Papsukkal's wife Amasagnudi was Ninkagal, "lady of the gate." Ninkita's name possibly means "lady of the doorstep." Frans Wiggermann notes that while the section dedicated to them uses the name Ninshubur to refer to their father, there is no evidence they were ever regarded as the daughters of the older female version of Ninshubur attested as the sukkal of Inanna in the third millennium BCE.

=== Papsukkal and other messenger deities ===
While Papsukkal's origin was distinct from both Ninshubur's and Ilabrat's, he came to be identified with both of them, as well as with Kakka. However, the conflation of Ninshubur and Papsukkal was only finalized in the Seleucid period in Uruk. The earlier Weidner god list does not equate Papsukkal with Ninshubur, and instead places him next to Zababa and Ilaba. The god list An = Anu ša amēli explains the syncretism between them in following terms: ^{d}nin-šubur = ^{d}pap-sukkal ša da-nim, "Ninshubur is Papsukkal when Anu is concerned."

The late syncretic Papsukkal was not regarded as the sukkal of Anu and Ishtar like Ninshubur, but rather of Anu and his wife Antu. He also takes Ninshubur's role in an Akkadian adaptation of Inanna's Descent, but unlike her he is not directly designated as Ishtar's servant, and the text states that he serves "the great gods" as a group.

A god list from Emar identifies Papsukkal with the Hurrian sukkal Tašmišu.

== Worship ==
The oldest evidence for the worship of Papsukkal comes from Kish from the Old Babylonian period. In later times a temple in this city dedicated to him was also known as E-Akkil, originally the name of Ninshubur's temple in her cult center Akkil, located near Bad-tibira.

A ritual known from a text from Sultantepe meant to solve "door troubles" (lumun dalti) involved making offerings to Papsukkal and Ninhedu.

In the first millennium BCE, Papsukkal was worshiped in Kish, Babylon (where he had a temple), Arbela, Assur and Bīt-Bēlti. Additionally, a city named Dur-Papsukkal existed near Der. It is mentioned in a document according to which it was besieged by the Assyrian king Shamshi-Adad V, opposed by Babylonian king Marduk-balassu-iqbi and his Elamite allies.

Papsukkal was also worshiped in Uruk, but he was only introduced there in the Seleucid period, when the entire pantheon of this city was restructured. Ishtar, Nanaya and their court, encompassing deities such as Uṣur-amāssu, were surpassed in prominence by Anu and Antu. While Anu was not completely absent from Uruk at any point in time between the third and first millennium BCE, his position was that of a "figurehead" and "otiose deity" according to Paul-Alain Beaulieu. He proposes that Anu's rise was the result of Babylon losing its influence after Persian conquest, which resulted in the development of a new local theology relying on the god list An = Anum (which starts the divine hierarchy with Anu), meant to enhance local pride. A side effect of the process was the introduction of deities connected with Anu, such as Papsukkal and his wife Amasagnudi, to the pantheon of the city. In Seleucid Uruk, Papsukkal was believed to guard the main gate of Bīt Rēš, the temple complex of Anu. A socle dedicated to him located within it was known as the E-gubiduga, "house whose voice is pleasing." A festival dedicated to him, which took the form of a ceremonial meal, took place each year on the seventeenth day of the month Tašritu.

Theophoric names invoking Papsukkal are well attested from the Neo-Babylonian period. However, in Seleucid Uruk he is only attested in a single one, which belonged to a scribe. They were also rare in the Old Babylonian period, and unlike Ninshubur he was rarely chosen as a family deity.
