= Malgium =

Archaeological site in Iraq

- Tulūl al-Fāj / Tell Yassir
- Location within Iraq
- 32°33′41″N 45°6′0″E
- Type: settlement
- Periods: Late Chalcolithic, Bronze Age
- Cultures: Ubaid, Uruk, Ur III, Old Babylonian
- Location: Iraq

Site notes
- Excavation dates: 2018, 2022, 2024
- Archaeologists: Ahmed Ali Jawad, Lucio Milano
- Condition: Ruined
- Owner: Public
- Public access: Yes

Malgium (also Malkum or Malgûm) (Ĝalgi’a or Ĝalgu’a in Sumerian, and Malgû(m) in Akkadian) is an ancient Mesopotamian city tentatively identified as Tell Yassir (one of a group of tells called collectively Tulūl al-Fāj) which thrived especially in the Middle Bronze Age, ca. 2000 BC - 1600 BC. Malgium formed a small city-state in an area where the edges of the territories controlled by Larsa, Babylon and Elam converged. Inscribed in cuneiform as ma-al-gi-im^{KI} (or ma-al-gu-um^{KI}), its chief deities were Ea (whose temple was called Enamtila) and Damkina. A temple of Ulmašītum is known to have been there. There was also a temple to the goddess Bēlet-ilī called Ekitusgestu as well as a temple to the god Anum. During the time of one ruler Malgium was written differently, ma_{3}-al-ka^{KI}. The unlacted town of Ibrat is thought to have been near Malgium.

Tablets illegally excavated from Malgium have begun to appear on the antiquities market. One, in a private collection, had a new, second, year name for Imgur-Sîn "The year the ‘Tigris/Zubi-Canal-of-Imgur-Sîn’ was dug by King ^{d}Imgur-Sîn". Note the divine determinative for the rulers name.

A few complete and partial year names for rulers of Malgium have been determined including "year when king ^{d}Šu-Kakka killed aurochs and wild cows", "year when ^{d}Nur-Eštar, the mighty male, set in place the foundation of Eduru-Mama", "year when ^{d}Šu-Kakka erected Bad-Enlila", and "year when king ^{d}Imgur-Sin erected Bad-Enlila in the Upper Land, and erected (also) Bad-gar.lum facing the Native Land"

A fragmentary Lament for the destruction of Kesh and Malgium has also been found.

== History ==
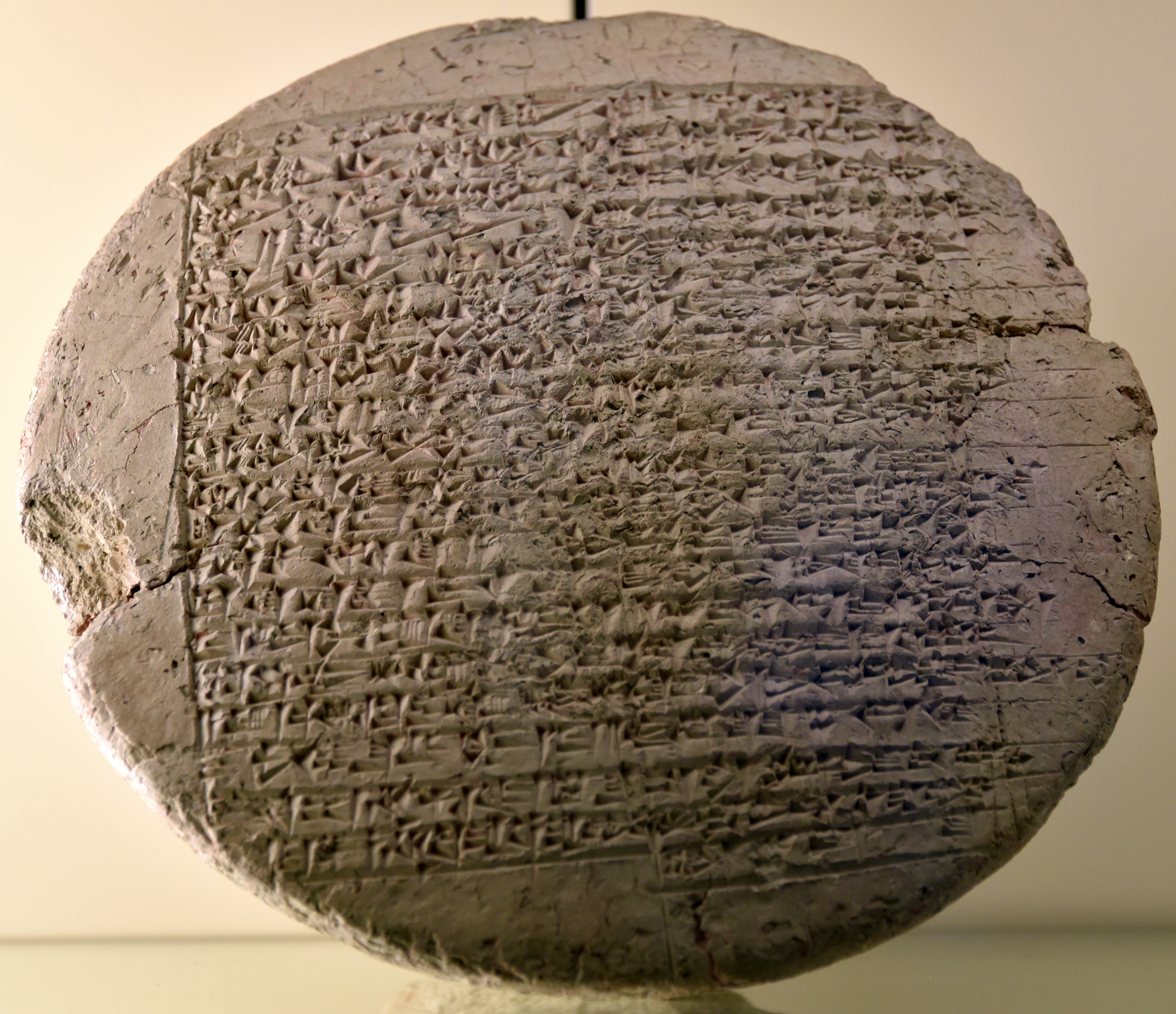
Inscribed clay nail of Ipik-Ishtar, king of Malgium, 1770 BCE. From Malgium, Iraq. Vorderasiatisches Museum, Berlin

Occupation at the Tell Yassir, the presumed location of Magium, dates back to the Ubaid 2 period based on finds so clay sickles. Occupation continued in the Uruk period with finds including beveled rim bowls and "tall flowerpots" (Grosse Blumentopfe). There was then an absence of pottery remains until the Early Dynastic III period, suggesting a period of abandonment.

=== Akkadian Period ===
Malgium is also mentioned in the literary composition "Cuthean Legend of Naram-Sin" ie "He has summoned against me a mighty foe. [. . . ] battle against me as far as Malgium."

=== Ur III Period ===
Cuneiform tablets from the city of Irisaĝrig (now believed to be the nearby Tell al-Wilayah), now published, show that Malgium conquered that city roughly after year 10 of Ibbi-Sin, the last ruler of the Ur III empire. The tablets also included year names showing that kings Nur-Eštar (previously unknown), ^{d}Šu-Kakka, ^{d}Nabi-Enlil, ^{d}Šu-Amurrum, ^{d}Imgur-Sin, and Ištaran-asu ruled over Irisaĝrig.

=== Isin-Larsa Period ===
The kings of Larsa targeted Malgium in their pursuit of territorial expansion with Gungunum celebrating its defeat in his 19th year name "Year on the orders of An, Enlil and Nanna (the army of) Malgium was defeated by weapons ...", circa 1914 BC, Sin-Iddinam its defeat in his 5th year name ca. 1844 and Warad-Sîn commemorated mu ugnim mà-al-gu-um^{ki} ^{giš}tukul ba(-an)-sìg, “Year : the army^{?} of Malgium was smitten by weapons”, ca. 1831 BC.

=== Old Babylonian Period ===
Ḫammu-rāpi of Babylon (c. 1792–1750 BC), in a coalition with Shamshi-Adad I (of Ekallatum)and Ibal-pi-El II (of Eshnunna), campaigned against the city-state until its ruler bought them off with 15 talents of silver. Malgium’s king, ^{d}Ipiq-Ištar, concluded a treaty and subsequently provided aid and soldiers in Ḫammu-rāpi’s campaign against Larsa. After years of conflict, Ḫammu-rāpi destroyed the city walls of Malgium in his 35th year of reign denoting that year as "Year in which Hammu-rabi the king by the orders of An and Enlil destroyed the city walls of Mari and Malgium". Most of the population of Malgium was deported to Kish, Isin, and especially Pī-Kasî (modern Tell Abu Antiq). Prisoner of war records from Uruk under ruler Rîm-Anum (c. 18th century BC) who was a contemporary of Samsu-iluna of Babylon (son of Ḫammu-rāpi) mention a number of captives from Malgium.

Malgium survived in some form until late in the 2nd millennium BC and is recorded in two kudurru of Kassite ruler Meli-Šipak (c. 1186–1172 BC). It was also a province of the Second Dynasty of Isin (c. 1153–1022 BC).

== Rulers ==
The first known ruler of Malgium, contemporary with the reign of Ibbi-Sin (c. 2028–2004 BC) of the Ur III empire is Nur-Eštar. Three of his year names are known from Irisaĝrig provenanced text, including "year when Nur-Eštar <became king?>", "year when Nur-Eštar, the mighty male, set in place the foundation of Eduru-Mama". Based on other texts it is thought that the successor of Nur-Eštar was ^{d}Šu-Kakka. Note that unlike the other known rulers of Malgium the name of Nur-Eštar is not deified in his year names or some other texts but the name is preceded by a Dingir in some personal names. In a recent text from the antiquities market it appears that Nur-Eštar built a temple to the god Amurru.

A number of rulers of Malgium have been identified, with varying degrees of certainty (note that their names indicated they was "deified"):

- ^{d}Takil-ilissu - "šàr (lugal) ma-al-gi-im^{ki}, ^{d}Takil-ilissu, son of Ištaran-asû,
- ^{d}Imgur-Sîn, son of Ili-abi
- ^{d}Ipiq-Ištar (son of Apil-Ilišu), a contemporary of Ḫammu-rāpi of Babylon, who celebrated conflict with the city in two of his year names (10 and 35).
- ^{d}Šu-Kakka (also Shu-kakka) Known year names are "The year: ^{d}Šu-Kakka, the king, fashioned a mural crown of lapis lazuli and gold for Damgalnunna", "Year when king ^{d}Šu-Kakka killed aurochs and wild cows", and "Year when ^{d}Šu-Kakka erected Bad-Enlila".
- ^{d}Nabi-Enlil (son of Šu-Kakka)
- ^{d}Šu-Amurrum (son of Nabi-Enlil)
- Naram-Sin
- Muhaddum (son of Abumma)

Others that have been suggested are Iddin-ilum, Warad-Sin, Ili-abi, Istaran-asu, Abumma, Apil-Ilišu, and Ennum-Tispak.

== Tell Yassir ==
Tell Yassir (Latitude:32.56148, Longitude:45.09958), 20 kilometers northwest of Maškan-šāpir is now generally thought to be the location of ancient Malgium. Note that the site of Tell al-Baghdadya has also been suggested. Tell Yassir (in Wasit Governorate, Iraq) is a single mound covering around 15 hectares and rising to a height of 17.6 meters above the plain. The outer margins of the mound have been much damaged by modern agriculture and the area extensively looted. The ancient dry bed of the Shatt en-Nil canal lies less then 2 kilometers to the south and aluvium from it covers much of the area. A number of small mounds (3-5 hectares in area) are nearby, mainly to the west of the main mound. It is one of a group of tells collectively called Tulūl al-Fāj which have now been identified as the location of Malgium. The current excavators have attempted to rename the site "Tell Qariyah Khamsa I" (as site WS031), after an obscure nearby village, separated the site from inclusion in the Tulūl al-Fāj cluster. After the 2003 invasion Iraqi archaeologists with the Iraqi State Board of Antiquities and Heritage conducted a surface survey at Tell Yassir and found that the site was heavily looted, especially in the central area of the mound, to the extent that administrative, temple, and palatial structures visible from earlier satellite images could no longer be found. In 2018 a team from the Iraqi State Board of Antiquities and Heritage led by Ahmed Ali Jawad surveyed the site of Tell Yassir. Along with pottery shards a number of inscribed bricks were found including those of Ur III rulers (Shulgi and Shu-Suen) and rulers of Malgium and declared Tell Yassir as the site of Malgium though this was not universally accepted. An example brick inscription:

^{d}šu-^{d}MAR.TU
LUGAL KALAG.GA
LUGAL MA.DA.NA
DUMU na-bí-/^{d}EN.LÍL
MU.ÚS.SA/ du-un-nu-um^{ki}
GÚ ^{íd}IDIGNA /BA.HUL
BÀD.GAL ma-al-gu-um^{ki}
MU.UN.DÙ

Translation:

^{d}Šu-Amurrum,
strong king,
king of his country,
son of ^{d}Nabi-Enlil.
(In) the year following the year "Dunnum
on the banks of the Tigris was destroyed,"
the great wall of Malgium
he built.

The area was visited in 2018 by an Italian team from the University of Venice led by Lucio Milano. In 2022 and 2024 archaeological surface surveys were conducted at Tell Yassir (within a radius of2-4 kilometers) and for a 10 kilometer radius around it by the Wasit Archaeological Survey by a University of Florence and Ca' Foscari University of Venice team led by Lucio Milano. Thirty eight brick inscriptions were found, mostly mentioning known rulers including one previously unknown ruler, Naram-Sin (not to be confused with a number of other rulers with that name).

=== Tulūl al-Fāj ===
Tulūl al-Fāj is a group of archaeological sites one of which is Tell Yassir In 2017 Iraqi archaeologists, led by Abbas Al-Hussainy of the University of Al-Qadisiyah began an archaeological survey of an area east of the Euphrates and in 2019 conducted a surface survey at Tell Yassir. During this survey about 50 inscribed bricks or Malgium rulers were found, with 48 of the inscriptions being stamped. One of the stamped bricks, from ruler Takil-ilissu, also contained a handwritten inscriptions. This team suggested that Tulūl al-Fāj may be the site of Malgium vs only Tell Yassir.

== Tell Abu Antiq ==
The site of Tell Abu Antiq (geo-coordinates: 32.131602, 44.638840) (also Tell abu Anteak, Tal abu Anteak, Abu Antiq, Tell Abu Anetik) lies about 50 kilometers south of ancient Babylon. Its ancient name is believed to have been Pī-Kasî. Little is known about the city of Pī-Kasî. After its destruction by Hammurabi most of the population of Malgium was deported to Pī-Kasî.

The site consists of two hills, separated by an ancient water channel, with a total area of 9 square kilometers. It was excavated by an Iraqi team between 1999 and 2007 in response to continued looting and over 1250 Old Babylonian period cuneiform tablets from the reigns of Samsu-iluna and Abi-ešuḫ were recovered as well as other finds. The tablets are of "letters, economic and administrative tablets, lexical lists, literature, mathematical tablets, and lenticular school exercises".

Before excavations began the site had been subject to heavy looting by locals beginning before 1913 and a number of cuneiform tablets had entered the antiquities market from that. The results of archaeological excavation have allowed the provenance of about 500 of the pre-1913 tablets to be assigned to Tell Abu Antiq. Many of the texts are held in private and public collections and classed as a group "Yaḫrūrum šaplûm archives". The archive is dated to the reign of Babylonian ruler Samsu-iluna. Some are held in the De Liagre Böhl collection at The Netherlands Institute for the Near East and the Louvre. An example of a newly kinked text is:

"Speak to the rabiânum-mayor of Pī-kasî and elders of the city. Thus (says) Sîn-ḫazir, Previously, a slave woman of my servant, Awīl-Nabium, fled and she was found staying with her mother in Pī-kasî, so I wrote, then (10) they led this slave woman here ..."

An example of a tablet from Tell Abu Antiq (bandicoot here refers to the Bunn's short-tailed bandicoot rat):

"... From Tur-Ugalla 7 bandicoots did Tutu-māgir send me; 6 to Šamaš-lamassašu, the ‘mirror-holder,’ I sent on; just one for my own repast I kept back, and it tasted excellent! How good they were had I but known, a single one to Šamaš-lamassašu I’d not have sent! ..."

== See also ==
- Cities of the ancient Near East
- List of Mesopotamian dynasties
- List of Mesopotamian deities
