= Qingu =

Mesopotamian god

- Commander of Tiamat's army in the Enūma Eliš
- Major cult center: Babylon, Assur

Genealogy
- Spouse: Tiamat

Qingu (𒀭𒆥𒄖, ^{d}qin-gu; less commonly romanized as Kingu) was a Mesopotamian god. He is best known from the Enūma Eliš, where he acts as a subordinate and spouse of Tiamat, and an adversary of Marduk. After his defeat he is killed and his blood is used in the creation of mankind. It is presumed that he might have originally been the antagonist of a separate myth unrelated to Tiamat, though this composition does not survive, and the majority of references to him are allusions to his defeat at the hands of Marduk in Enūma Eliš. He is also mentioned in the myth The Defeat of Enutila, Enmešarra, and Qingu and in a variety of other texts.

== Name ==
The most widespread spelling of Qingu's name in cuneiform is ^{d}qin-gu, though sporadically ^{d}qi-in-gu, ^{d}qin-ga and ^{d}qin-gi occur as well. A further variant, ^{d}qin-gu-gu, is presumed to be a dittographic error. While the romanization Kingu can be sometimes found in modern literature, Qingu is the most commonly used, and is presumed to be more accurate to the original pronunciation.

It is accepted that Qingu's name has Sumerian origin, as it would be unlikely for an Akkadian root to contain both q and g. Manfred Krebernik suggests that it can be connected with the terms kíĝ (KIN), "work", and kingal, "leader". This proposal is also supported by others authors, such as Wilfred G. Lambert and Selena Wisnom.

== Character ==
The Mesopotamians considered Qingu a defeated adversary of the gods. He is overall best attested as an enemy of Marduk. He could be characterized as a "primordial god associated with the netherworld". A late Assyrian source which groups Qingu with Anzû and Asakku most likely implies that he could be classified as a demon like them as well.

Two apparent cases of equation between Qingu and Enmesharra, presumably based on their shared status as vanquished adversaries of the gods, are attested in ritual texts. The isolated reference to "seven sons of Qingu" (tablet KAR 307, line 18) is likely to reflect an association with Enmesharra too, as references to "seven sons of Enmesharra" are common.

An association between Qingu and Tammuz is attested in a single damaged explanatory text, though due to its poor state of preservation the rationale behind it is unknown.

=== As a name of Marduk ===
In addition to functioning as the name of a distinct figure, Qingu is also attested as a title of Marduk. A hymn to Nabu presumed to postdate the Enūma Eliš describes him as an offspring of Qingu. It is likely that in this context Qingu was also understood as a name of Marduk, rather than as his adversary. In the Enūma Eliš itself, two apparent variants of Qingu's name, Irqingu (^{d}ir-qin-gu; tablet VII, line 105) and Qinma (^{d}qin-ma; tablet VII, line 107) occur among the 50 names assigned to Marduk after his victory over Tiamat. Sophus Helle argues that Irqingu was originally a name etymologically unrelated to Qingu, but was reinterpreted as a combination of this theonym and the word ir, "to ravage", by the compilers of the Enūma Eliš. Wilfred G. Lambert suggested that Qinma (also romanized as Kinma), which is also attested as a name of Marduk in the god list An = Anum (tablet II, line 221) and in a further fragmentary god list, might have been an artificial Emesal form of Qingu's name in origin.

== Mythology ==
=== Enūma Eliš ===
Qingu is first mentioned in the Enūma Eliš when Tiamat appoints him as the leader of her army of monsters and affixes the tablet of destinies to his chest, elevating him to a position of "Anuship", ^{d}a-nu-ti. While this term is derived from the name of the god Anu, when applied as a title to other deities, including Qingu, it can be understood as a generic designation for the rank of a supreme deity instead. A variant of this passage instead refers to Qingu's position as that of "lordship" (e-nu-ti). The text directly states that the tablet was not Qingu's rightful possession, though it is not explained how it was obtained by Tiamat.

Qingu subsequently uses his new position to declare destinies for Tiamat's children. It is not clear if he is himself one of them, as no direct statement is given about his origin. Gösta Gabriel notes that he effectively "appears out of nowhere", and that he is only defined as Tiamat's spouse. Wilfred G. Lambert suggests that lack of an explicit reference to his origins might indicate that the compilers of the Enūma Eliš incorporated a figure with no preexisting connection to Tiamat into the narrative from a separate source. It is sometimes nonetheless assumed that he was regarded as a son of Tiamat and Apsu.

Marduk defeats Qingu after vanquishing Tiamat, and takes back the tablet of destinies. It is later presented to Anu. Qingu is subsequently killed after the assembly of the gods concludes that the conflict between them and Tiamat was instigated by him. However, no mention of Qingu making her rebel as suggested in this passage is found in the preceding sections of the text. Qingu's blood is then used by Ea to create mankind.

==== Parallels with other myths ====
Manfred Krebernik notes that the sections of the plot focused on Qingu have their forerunners in myths focused on Enlil and Ninurta describing the theft of the tablet of destiny. According to Wilfred G. Lambert, Qingu's improper acquisition of the tablet of destinies and its later recovery offer a particularly close parallel to the plot of the Epic of Anzû. Selena Wisnom also compares Qingu to Anzû. However, she points out that while Anzû is portrayed as difficult to defeat for Ninurta due to possessing the tablet, in Qingu's case the object only serves as an abstract symbol of his position, and no similar hardships arise for Marduk. A further possible parallel is that Qingu is elevated to the rank of Anuship, while Anzû by stealing the tablet has a claim to "Enlilship" (enlilūtu), an analogous term derived from the name of Enlil rather than Anu.

Wisnom notes that Qingu can also be compared to the "plant-stone" (^{na_{4}}U_{2}), (Note: Possibly to be identified as emery.) the leader of the army of stones from Lugal-e, as both of them are secondary obstacles compared to the central antagonists of the respective narratives, Tiamat and Asag. Furthermore, the scene of Qingu's appointment might constitute an allusion to the creation of the "plant-stone" and his appointment as a leader among Asag's stone offspring.

No other sources connect Qingu with the creation of mankind. Ryan D. Winters notes that he is absent from a short list of gods who appear in a similar role in different myths included in An = Anum (tablet VI, lines 209-216), and on this basis concludes this motif cannot predate the end of the Old Babylonian period. Wilfred G. Lambert assumed that the compilers of the Enūma Eliš might have placed him in a role originally played by a different god. Comparisons have been made between the scene of his death and the section of Atrahasis dealing with the creation of mankind, which involves the killing of the god Wē. Selena Wisnom notes that after the Old Babylonian period he was replaced in this role by Alla, whose name might be a pun on the word al, "hoe", and thus a reference to his role as a worker god. On this basis she suggests Qingu's placement in a similar role reflected the etymological connection between his name and the word "work". However, she states he and Alla cannot be considered direct equivalents, as Qingu plays a more active role in the narrative before being killed.

=== Other sources ===
While no independent myth dealing with the defeat of Qingu has survived, due to scarcity of texts linking him with Tiamat other than the Enūma Eliš it is presumed that he was initially the antagonist of such a narrative. References to defeat of Qingu without any allusions to Tiamat are known, and following a late exercise tablet from Ur reflect a tradition in which he was burned. An exegetical commentary on a ritual involving Mullissu similarly explains the burnt offering of a sheep as an allusion to Qingu's demise in a fire. Two sources, the tablets KAR 307 and LKA 73, state that Qingu was defeated alongside his sons, though they disagree about their number, with the former giving 7 and the latter 40. KAR 307 states that during a ritual they were represented by a bull and a sheep thrown from a roof, while LKA 73 instead has them represented by oil and honey placed on a weapon. The latter text also contains an allusion to an unknown myth involving Ea giving an unidentified gift to Qingu.

The myth referred to as The Defeat of Enutila, Enmešarra, and Qingu by Wilfred G. Lambert, (Note: The title has been subsequently adopted by other authors.) which is only known from two Late Babylonian fragments, one from Borsippa and one from Sippar, mentions the defeat of Qingu at the hands of an unknown deity or deities. Due to the large number of deities involved in the plot, Lambert suggests that it was the result of a process of scholarly compilation of multiple different compositions belonging to the same genre. The events are said to take place in Babylon, with direct references made to the temples Eturkalamma (as well as the deity it was dedicated to, Ishtar of Babylon), Eguzalimmaⱨ and Ezidagišnugal. Qingu is described as the "director of the host of Eguzalimmaⱨ". Since this temple is associated with Ningishzida in the topographical text Tintir = Babylon (tablet IV, line 13), Lambert assumed that in this context Qingu was either equated with him or portrayed as his subordinate.

== Worship ==
Wilfred G. Lambert proposed that the deity ^{d}KIN known only from the Early Dynastic theophoric name Ur-^{d}KIN might represent an early form of Qingu, though he stressed it cannot be established how his role would be imagined at the time. In later periods Qingu was worshiped in a similar capacity as other figures regarded as defeated adversaries of the gods.

According to Tintir = Babylon, a topographical compendium most likely composed during the reign of Nebuchadnezzar I in the end of the twelfth century BCE, a cultic seat (šubtu) dedicated to Qingu, known under the ceremonial name Ešgar ("house which is set up"), existed in the Esagil temple complex in Babylon (tablet II, line 21). Andrew R. George states his presence in this location most likely reflected his role as a defeated enemy of Marduk. References to Qingu are also present in other religious texts focused on Marduk's victories. For example, Ashurbanipal's prayer to Marduk and Zarpanit mentions Qingu, referred to as the "spouse of Tiamat". (Note: While this text is at least partially based on the Enūma Eliš, it also lists Anzû among Marduk's defeated enemies.) However, a hymn to Marduk (K 2523) also mentions Qingu in passing and characterizes him as a warrior, but does not allude to any hostility between them.

A ritual for the opening of a canal from the first millennium BCE known from a copy from Nineveh prescribes offering three silver dishes to Qingu, Mummu and Ešret-nabnīssu. The last name can be translated as "his ten creations", and is presumably a reference to ten monsters created by Tiamat commanded by Qingu and defeated alongside him in the Enūma Eliš. Wilfred G. Lambert suggested that the presence of Mummu might indicate that the ritual reflects a hitherto unknown myth in which he and Qingu were defeated together. However, Beatrice Baragli and Uri Gabbay assume that Mummu's presence also constitutes a reference to the Enūma Eliš, as him, Qingu and Tiamat's creatures are all described being captured and bound after their respective defeats.

According to a late Assyrian compendium conventionally referred to as the Götteradressbuch, Qingu was worshiped in Assur in the temple of Ea-šarru ("Ea the king") alongside its primary god, as well as Damkina, Išḫara, Ugurtu (Note: A goddess associated with the underworld whose name is most likely etymologically related to the theonym Ugur; she was also worshiped in the same city in the temple of Sebitti.) and Malik.

== Miscellaneous attestations ==
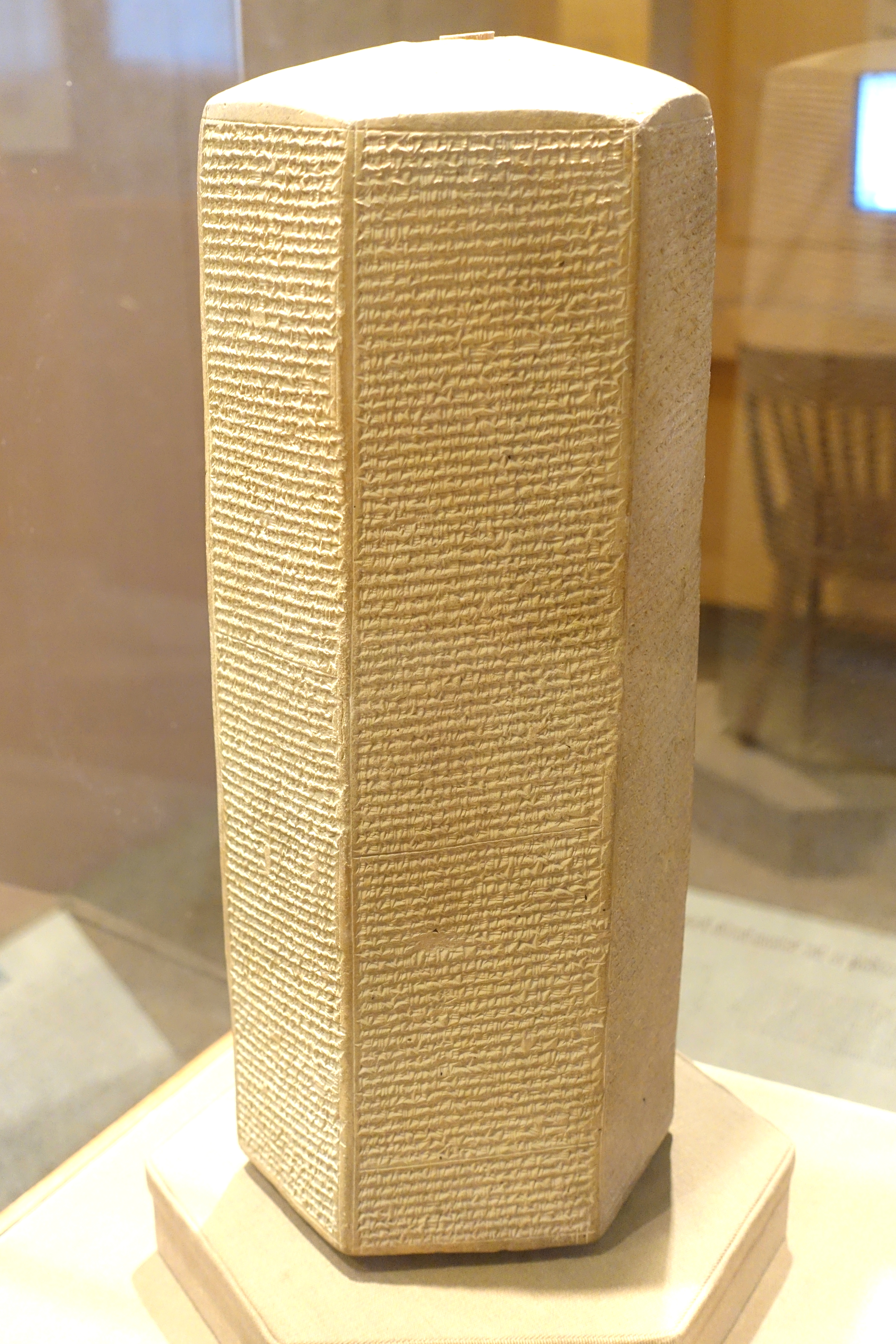
The Chicago Prism.

Beate Pongratz-Leisten argues that the account of the battle of Halule from Sennacherib's Chicago Prism, dated to 691 BCE, implicitly compares his opponent Mushezib-Marduk and his forces to Qingu and Tiamat's "horrible creatures" (gallê lemnūti) in order to delegitimize him. She argues that the description of Mushezib-Marduk being inappropriately enthroned constitutes a direct allusion to Qingu's appointment by Tiamat in the Enūma Eliš.

The so-called Birdcall Text, a first millennium BCE theological composition known from copies from Nineveh and Sultantepe which provides theological explanations for the calls of different birds, states that the cry of the duck (paspasu), identified as the "bird of Kusu", can be interpreted as an allusion to Qingu, presumably based on a perceived phonetic similarity. While associations between specific deities and birds are also known from other sources, it is not certain if all of those presented in the Birdcall Text were already established before its composition. Wilfred G. Lambert considered this implausible due to multiple differences between the two available copies, though he stressed the associations should be evaluated on a case by case basis.

A late Babylonian calendar treatise related to the traditions associated with Esagil uses Qingu, Tiamat and Marduk as symbolic representations of rulers of Subartu, Elam and Babylonia.
