= Palm Tree King =

The Palm Tree King was one of the monsters later known as the Slain Heroes in the Sumerian epic, Lugale, which centered on the quest of Ninurta to recover the Tablets of Destiny, which were stolen by the Slain Heroes, from Ninurta's father, Enlil, the god of wind, air, earth, and storms and head of the Sumerian pantheon. The Palm Tree King, in the Lugale epic, was subservient to Imdugud (Assyrian Anzu), who held the Tablets until his defeat in combat with Ninurta.

Very little is known about the Palm Tree King, but he seems to be the only one of the monstrous "Slain Heroes" to have escaped Ninurta.
