= Ehursagtila =

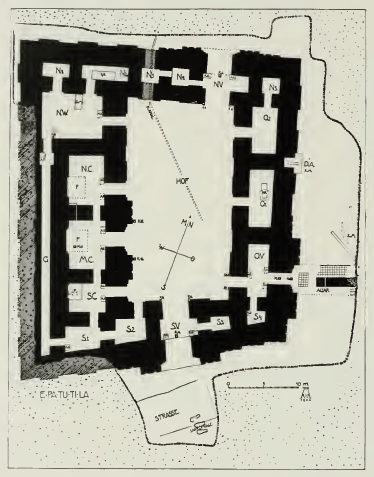
Plan of Ehursagtila by Robert Koldewey.

Ehursagtila (Sumerian: 𒂍𒄯𒊕𒋾𒆷, romanized: é-ḫur-sag-ti-la, 'House where the Mountain is annihilated') or the Ninurta-temple was a temple of Ninurta in sixth century BC Babylon.

== Description ==
The temple was located in the south part of the inner city of Babylon, near the Uraš Gate, to the east of the Nabû-dayyan-nišešu ceremonial road. It is a square structure roughly 40 metres on each side. The walls vary between 2 and 4 metres in thickness, indicating that it was originally very tall. Entrances on the northern, eastern, and southern sides of the temple led to a central courtyard. Along the west side of this courtyard were three chambers for cult statues. The central chamber was devoted to Ninurta himself, while the right (northern) chamber probably belonged to Ninurta's consort Gula, goddess of medicine, and the left (southern) chamber belonged to Marduk, patron god of Babylon. The sanctuary was arranged so that Marduk's statue - not Ninurta's - was visible from the roadway through the eastern entrance. Marduk's stage was lit up by the sun at dawn.

The temple was dedicated to Ninurta, god of warriors and spring floods. The name Ehursangtilla, which means 'House where the Mountain is annihilated' recalls his victory over the living mountain Asag in the Lugal-e epic. The surviving structure was built by Nabopolassar, restoring an older temple. Nabopolassar's interest in Ninurta was probably linked to his war with the Neo-Assyrian Empire (626-612 BC), but the prominence of Marduk in the sanctuary reflects his general focus on this god.

The temple was excavated by Robert Koldewey in the early twentieth century.

== Bibliography ==
- Baker, Heather D. (2011). "The statue of Bēl in the Ninurta temple at Babylon". Archiv für Orientforschung. 52: 117–120. ISSN 0066-6440. JSTOR 24595106.
- Radner, Karen (2020). A short history of Babylon. London, UK New York, NY: Bloomsbury Academic. ISBN 9781350138278.
