= Ninnibru =

Mesopotamian goddess

- Major cult center: Nippur

Genealogy
- Spouse: Ninurta

Ninnibru, also romanized as Nin-Nibru, was a Mesopotamian goddess regarded as the wife of Ninurta. She is attested in sources from between the Ur III and Kassite periods, including offering lists, the god list An = Anum, and the poem Angim. Later she came to be absorbed by Gula, and ceased to be worshiped as a separate deity.

== Name ==
The theonym Ninnibru can be translated from Sumerian as "the lady of Nippur." The Akkadian form of the name was Bēlet-Nippuri. The name Ungalnibru (Akkadian Šarrat-Nippuri) is sometimes used interchangeably with Ninnibru in scholarship, but it is generally agreed that these two goddesses were separate. While Ungalnibru occurs as a name of Gula, usually associated with Ninnibru, in the hymn of Bulluṭsa-rabi, the temples listed in the same passage were associated with Ninnibru.

In early scholarship it was assumed that the name of the Hurrian goddess Nabarbi might be derived from Ninnibru's, but today it is assumed it is related to the toponym Nawar instead.

== Associations with other deities ==
Ninnibru was regarded as the wife of Ninurta, as attested for example in the god list An = Anum. She also appears in this role in the composition Angim, where the eponymous god meets with her in his temple Ešumeša after presenting his battle trophies to his parents Enlil and Ninlil in the Ekur, and at her request blesses a king who is left unnamed. In a lament, Ninnibru "sheds tears for the Ešumeša". Her character and her relationship with Ninurta might have been influenced by other couples of deities in which at least one spouse shared some traits with one of them, such as Ninisina and Pabilsaĝ or Bau and Ningirsu.

Gula came to be associated with Ninnibru due to both of them sharing the role of Ninurta's spouse, and eventually fully absorbed her. In later periods, her name functioned as a title of Gula in the context of her presence in Ešumeša. Ninnibru was also associated with Ninimma, though according to Joan Goodnick Westenholz in this case the connection reflected the latter goddess' role as Ninurta's sister, rather than wife. However, only a single known copy of An = Anum refers to Ninimma as ^{d}nin-[urta]-ke_{4}, literally "lady of Ninurta," and Christopher Metcalf, relying on a recently published hymn which addresses her as Ninurta's wife, notes that this phrase might instead designate her as his spouse.

== Worship ==
The oldest attestations of Ninnibru have been dated to the Ur III period. She is absent from earlier god lists (such as the Fara and Abu Salabikh lists) and other sources from the Early Dynastic or Old Akkadian periods. She is also absent from the Old Babylonian Nippur god list, which according to Manuel Ceccarelli might indicate its compilers adhered to the view that Ninurta's spouse is to be identified as one of the Mesopotamian medicine goddesses instead.

In the Ur III period, Ninnibru sporadically occurs in sources from Nippur itself, as well as in a large number of offering lists from Puzrish-Dagan focused on Nippurian deities. One mentions her alongside Ninurta before the pairs Nuska and Sadarnunna and Lugalgusisu and Memešaga. She was worshiped alongside Ninurta in the temple Ešumeša. She also had her own temple in Nippur, though in a metrological text attesting its existence it is not provided with a distinct ceremonial name. In the Kassite period a temple dedicated to her was also built in Dur-Kurigalzu alongside those of Enlil, Ninlil and Ninurta, but its ceremonial name is similarly unknown.

Ninnibru is attested in a single offering list from the archives of the First Dynasty of Sealand, where she appears after Enlil, Ninlil, Ninurta and Nuska. She also appears in a hymn from this text corpus, according to which Ninmena was responsible for taking care of her, though this description is considered to be unusual, as a connection between the latter goddess and Nippur mentioned in this text is not otherwise known to researchers.

While it was considered uncertain in the past if Ninnibru was still worshiped during the reign of the Kassite dynasty, according to Joan Goodnick Westenholz she is attested in prayers and seal inscriptions documenting the popular religion of this period. Two inscriptions from Nippur are dedicated to her, while a third contemporary one comes from an unknown location.

Due to being absorbed by Gula, Ninnibru eventually ceased to be mentioned as a distinct deity. A late reference to her occurs in a hymn to Nanaya written in first person, in which the latter identifies herself with various city goddesses, which was presumably meant to exalt her position in the Mesopotamian pantheon.
