= Lord Saman-ana =

Ancient Sumerian monster

Lord Saman-Ana (from Sumerian Saman-Ana: high vessal) in Sumerian religion was one of the Heroes slain by Ninurta, patron god of Lagash, in ancient Iraq. Almost nothing else is mentioned of this "hero", his appearance is lacking.

== See also ==
- Ninlil
- Sumerian religion
- Anzû
