= Wild ram =

Wild ram or Wild Ram might refer to:

- The Nosebleeds, British band in the 1970s in Manchester formerly known as Wild Ram
- Six-headed Wild Ram, legendary creature in the Sumerian religion
