= Magilum boat =

The Magilum Boat (Magilum: from Sumerian ma-gi-lum, a ship of the netherworld) in Sumerian religion also known as the 'boat of the west' was one of the valuable items seized by Ninurta, patron god of Lagash, in ancient Iraq. This spoil was hung on an unknown part of his chariot according to the ancient source.It is also mentioned in The Epic of Gilgamesh: "All living creatures born of the flesh shall sit at last in the boat of the West, and when it sinks, when the boat of Magilum sinks, they are gone."

== See also ==
- Ninlil
- Sumerian religion
- Anzû
