= Strong copper =

The Strong Copper (from Sumerian urud niĝ kalag-ga) in Sumerian religion was one of the valuable items seized by Ninurta, the patron god of Lagash in ancient Iraq. This spoil was hung "on the inside pole pin" of his chariot, according to the ancient source (lines 55–63 ).

== See also ==
- Ninlil
- Sumerian religion
- Anzû
