= Mermaid (Ninurta) =

Figure in Sumerian religion

The Mermaid (from Sumerian Kuli-ana, "fish woman", female form of kulullu) in Sumerian religion was one of the Heroes slain by Ninurta, patron god of Lagash, in ancient Iraq. Her body was hung on the foot-board of Ninurta's chariot (lines 55-63 ).

== See also ==
- Kulullû
- Ninlil
- Sumerian religion
- Anzû
