= Lugal-e =

Mesopotamian myth

The ancient Mesopotamian myth beginning Lugal-e ud me-lám-bi nir-ğál, also known as Ninurta's Exploits, is a great epic telling of the warrior-god and god of spring thundershowers and floods, his deeds, waging war against his mountain rival á-sàg (“Disorder”; Akkadian: Asakku), destroying cities and crushing skulls, restoration of the flow of the river Tigris, returning from war in his “beloved barge” Ma-kar-nunta-ea and afterward judging his defeated enemies, determining the character and use of 49 stones, in 231 lines of the text. Its origins probably lie in the late third millennium BCe.

It is actually named for the first word of the composition (lugal-e “king,” in the ergative case) in two first-millennium copies, although earlier (Old Babylonian) copies begin simply with lugal, omitting the case ending. A subscript identifies it as a “širsud of Ninurta” (a širsud meaning perhaps “lasting song”) or “zami (praise) of Ninurta” depending on the reading of the cuneiform characters. With 728 lines and arranged on up to 13 tablets, Lugal-e is a poem in which the author (the god Ea according to a Catalogue of Texts and Authors) apparently combined perhaps three disparate myths in one literary composition. There are more than 80 extant exemplars but these show considerable textual variance.

== The myth ==
The tale opens with a feast of Ninurta with the gods, where his wife conveys the word of the (human) king. The divine weapon Šar’ur reports to Ninurta that the á-sàg demon, who has been appointed by the plants, has raided the border cities with his warriors, the rebellious stones who have tired of Ninurta's NAMTAR (Akkadian: šīmtu, "allocating tasks"). The demon "tore the flesh of the Earth and covered her with painful wounds." This causes Ninurta impetuously to set out to preempt further attack. He is temporarily thwarted by a dust storm, until Enlil provides relief with a rainstorm, thus enabling Ninurta to overcome á-sàg and release the waters which have been trapped in mountain ice, preventing its irrigation of the Mesopotamian plains, and replenish the diminished flows of the river Tigris. He then placates the concerns of his mother, Ninlil or Ninmaḫ (depending on text), before exercising judgement over the stones who have collaborated with Azag. Finally he returns to Nippur to receive the praise of his father and the gods.

Ninurta assigns various fates to the minerals that have been conquered in his cosmic battle. The kurgarrānum-stone is destined to be raw material for funerary figurines, “May you be made beautiful at [the festival] of ghosts, […for] nine [days] may the young men in a semi-circle make for you a doorway,” whereas the unfortunate šagara-stone is doomed to be discarded, "You will be thrown onto your bed", where no one will miss it and none will complain of its loss. In Ninurta’s blessing of the (diorite) esi-stone, the material of statues: “When the king who “sets” his name for long days (to come) fashions those statues for future days, when he places them at the libation place in the Eninnu, the house filled with rejoicing, may you (=the diorite) then be present for that purpose as befits you,” the king being recalled may be an explicit allusion to Gudea. The parallels with many of Gudea’s inscriptions have suggested that the work mythically retells his campaigns against Anšan and Elam. The work may have been composed during or shortly after his reign (ca. 2150 BC) to honor Ningirsu, the titulary deity of Lagaš, and then transferred to Nippur when subsumed by Ninurta.

The intended purpose of the composition, whether didactic or cultic, is uncertain although it may have been sung or recited following that of its sister work, Angim, in performance of a temple ritual. There are sâlu and mukallimtu commentaries on the work listed in late Assyrian library catalogues. Its survival into the first millennium was due to the importance of Ninurta to the Assyrian cult.
