= Six-headed Wild Ram =

Ancient Sumerian monster

The Six-headed Wild Ram (from Sumerian šeg-saĝ-6: ram with six heads) in Sumerian religion was one of the Heroes slain by Ninurta, patron god of Lagash, in ancient Iraq. Its body was hung on the dust-guard of Ninurta's chariot (lines 55-63 ).

== See also ==
- Ninlil
- Sumerian religion
- Anzû
