= Sharur (mythological weapon) =

Enchanted talking mace in Sumerian mythology

Sharur (Sumerian:𒊹𒃡 šar₂-ur₃), which means "smasher of thousands" is the weapon and symbol of the god Ninurta. Sumerian mythic sources describe it as an enchanted talking mace. It has been suggested as a possible precursor for similar objects in other mythology such as Arthurian lore.

== Role and powers in mythology ==
Sharur plays a prominent role in an incident in which Ninurta is described as using it to defeat Asag, a monstrous demon; Sharur has the power to fly across vast distances without impediment and communicate with its wielder.

This myth receives its most complete treatment in the epic Lugal-e, which in English is rendered as "The Exploits of Ninurta (O Warrior King)". According to this text, Sharur's role in the battle is not only as a weapon. It provides crucial intelligence to the hero, acting as an emissary between the god Enlil and Ninurta and relating to him the former's will, including a command to slay the architect Kur, a primeval serpent god venerated in Babylon, as well as a strategy to defeat Asag. Kur is associated with mountains and the primordial elements.

== Powers ==
Apart from its aforementioned ability to fly and communicate with its wielder, Sharur may also take the form of a winged lion, a common motif in Sumerian and Akkadian lore.

== See also ==
- Asakku
- Durandal
- Excalibur
- List of mythological weapons
- Mjølnir
- Vajra
- Dhulfiqar
