= Tablet of Destinies =

Clay tablet in Mesopotamian mythology

In Mesopotamian mythology, the Tablet of Destinies (Note: Commonly in general writing, the object's name is wrongly given as the Tablets of Destiny; the correct translation is Tablet of Destinies.) (Sumerian: 𒁾𒉆𒋻𒊏 dub namtarra; Akkadian: ṭup šīmātu, ṭuppi šīmāti) was envisaged as a clay tablet inscribed with cuneiform writing, also impressed with cylinder seals, which, as a permanent legal document, conferred upon the god Enlil his supreme authority as ruler of the universe. His aptitude as the greatest god gives him power over the other gods; only he has the ability to transform present circumstances back into their original state – redefining the course of fate. It is a major literary motif in ancient Sumerian myths including Ninurta and the Turtle, and in Akkadian myths including Enuma Elish.

== Other mentions ==
In the Sumerian poem Ninurta and the Turtle it is the god Enki, rather than Enlil, who holds the Tablet; it therefore resides with Enki in the Abzu (the primeval sea below the void space of the underworld (Kur) and the earth (Ma) above). Both this poem and the Akkadian Anzû poem concern the theft of the tablet by the bird Imdugud (Sumerian) or Anzû (Akkadian) from its original owner (Enki or Enlil). In the end, the Tablet is recovered by the god Ninurta and returned to Enlil.

The Tablet of Destinies is an important device in the Babylonian epic Enuma Elish, in which Tiamat bestows this tablet on Kingu when she takes him as her consort and gives him command of her army. The tablet is seized by the god Marduk after his defeat of Kingu.

The Tablet of Destinies is referenced in Text B (a copy of an inscription of Sennacherib in Neo-Babylonian script) on the tablet K 6177 + 8869, now in the British Museum.

== See also ==
- Anzu
- Enūma Eliš
- List of mythological objects

== Bibliography ==
- Black, Jeremy A.; Green, Anthony (1992). "Tablet of Destinies". Gods, Demons and Symbols of Ancient Mesopotamia: An illustrated dictionary. London, UK: British Museum Press.
- George, Andrew R. (1986). "Sennacherib and the Tablet of Destinies". Iraq. 48: 133–146. doi:10.2307/4200258. JSTOR 4200258.
- Sonik, Karen (20–25 July 2008). Written at Würzburg, DE. Wilhelm, Gernot (ed.). The Tablet of Destinies and the transmission of power in 'Enūma eliš'. Organization, Representation, and Symbols of Power in the Ancient Near East: Proceedings of the 54th Rencontre Assyriologique Internationale. Winona Lake: Eisenbrauns (published 2012). pp. 387–396. JSTOR 10.5325/j.ctv1bxgx80.34.
