= Asag =

Demon from Sumerian mythology

In the Sumerian mythological poem Lugal-e, Asag or Azag (Sumerian:𒀉𒉺 a₂-sag₃; Akkadian: asakku) is a monstrous demon. In the poem, his power is so hideous that it makes fishes boil alive in the rivers.

== Mythology ==
The Asag is generally identified as a hideous demon or "chaos-monster". In the Lugal-e, he is described as the offspring of the sky god An and the earth goddess Ki.

The demon is associated with the mountains; he mated with the kur (mountains) to produce a brood of "stone" offspring which formed an army of allies. He was vanquished by the heroic deity Ninurta (or Ningirsu), using Sharur, his enchanted talking mace, after seeking the counsel of his father, the god Enlil. In another version of the myth, the Asag is defeated by Adad (Iškur).

Scholars interpret the defeat of the Asag and his stone allies by Ninurta as a mythological expression of the anxiety felt by the inhabitants of the Mesopotamian plain regarding the inhabitants of the Zagros Mountains.

=== Artistic representation ===
The battle between the god and the monster may be depicted on the large stone reliefs erected by Ashurnasirpal II (9th century BC) in the temple of Ninurta at Kalhu (Nimrud). These reliefs show a god wielding thunderbolts attacking a lion-dragon beast. A similar scene appears on Neo-Assyrian seals.

== Asakku ==
The Akkadian name Asakku is used by researchers as either a synonym of Asag or a variation in the form of multiple spirits. In magical texts and incantations, the asakku is a demon who attacks humans, specifically by causing "head fevers".

In a separate tradition, the "Seven Asakku" (or Eight) are a specific group of demons who are the offspring of An. Like the Sumerian Asag, they are said to have been defeated by Ninurta.

== Sources ==
- Bane, T. (2014). Encyclopedia of Demons in World Religions and Cultures. McFarland Myth and Legend Encyclopedias. McFarland, Incorporated, Publishers. ISBN 978-0-7864-8894-0.
- Black, Jeremy; Green, Anthony (1992). "Asag (Asakku)". Gods, Demons and Symbols of Ancient Mesopotamia: An Illustrated Dictionary. London: The British Museum Press. pp. 35–36. ISBN 0-7141-1705-6.
- Wiggermann, F.A.M. (1992). Mesopotamian Protective Spirits: The Ritual Texts. Cuneiform monographs. STYX & PP Publications. ISBN 978-90-72371-52-2.
