= Ninurta =

Ancient Mesopotamian god

Ninurta 𒀭𒊩𒌆𒅁
- God of agriculture, hunting, and war
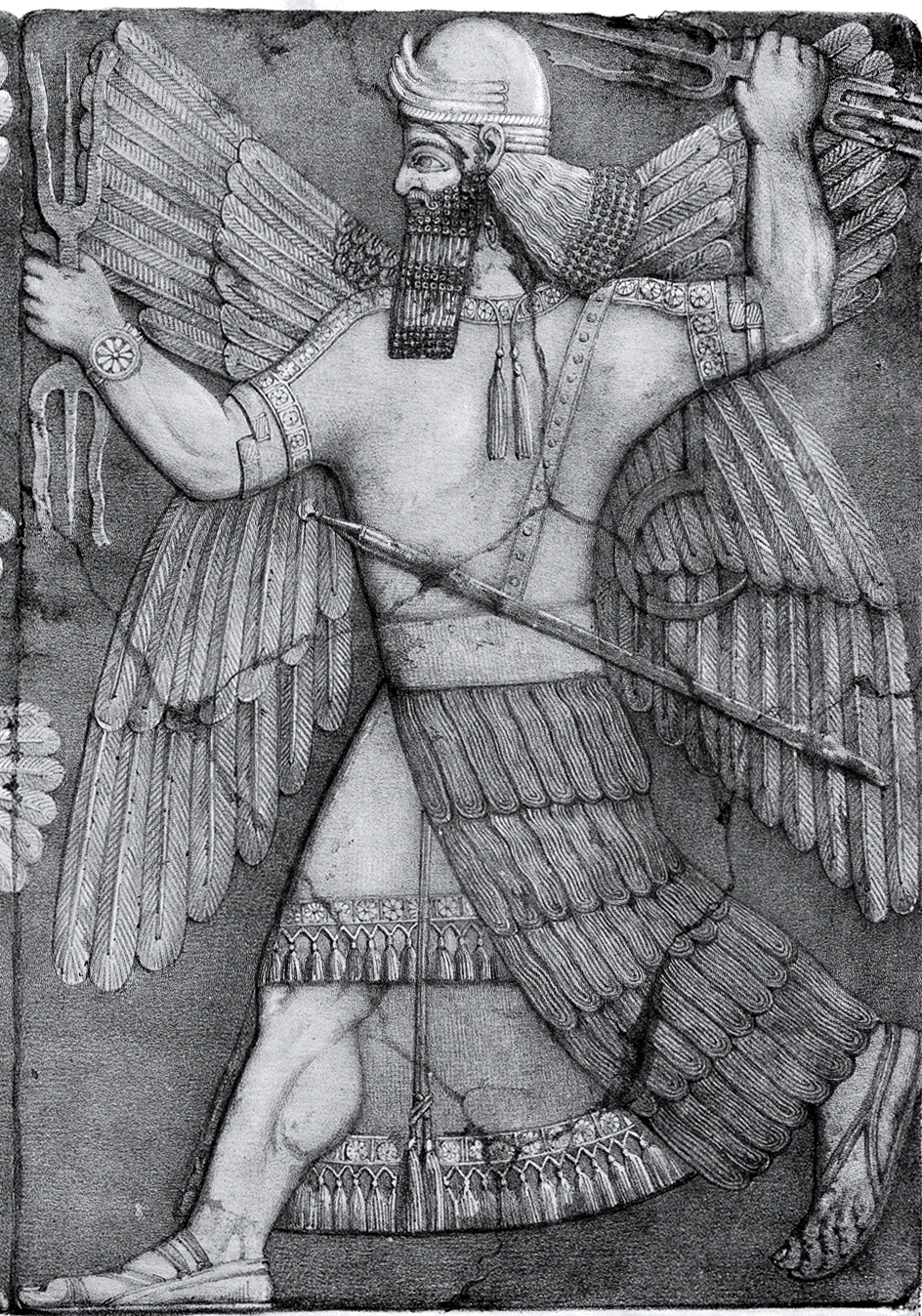
- Assyrian stone relief from the temple of Ninurta at Kalhu, showing the god with his thunderbolts pursuing Anzû, who has stolen the Tablet of Destinies from Enlil's sanctuary (Austen Henry Layard Monuments of Nineveh, 2nd Series, 1853)
- Abode: Eshumesha temple in Nippur; Later Kalhu, during Assyrian times
- Planet: Saturn, Mercury
- Symbol: Plow and perched bird
- Mount: Beast with the body of a lion and the tail of a scorpion
- Parents: Enlil and Ninhursag; As Urash, An
- Consort: As Ninurta: Gula; As Ninĝirsu: Bau

Equivalents
- Greek: Cronus
- Caananite: Attar
- Eblaite: Aštabi
- Roman: Saturn

Ninurta (Sumerian: 𒀭𒊩𒌆𒅁: ^{D}NIN.URTA, possible meaning "Lord [of] Barley"), also known as Ninĝirsu (Sumerian: 𒀭𒊩𒌆𒄈𒋢: ^{D}NIN.ĜIR_{2}.SU, meaning "Lord [of] Girsu"), is an ancient Mesopotamian god associated with farming, healing, hunting, law, scribes, and war who was first worshipped in early Sumer. In his earliest depictions, he is a god of agriculture and of healing with the power to cure illness and to exorcise demons. As Mesopotamia grew more militarized, Ninurta became a warrior deity, though he retained many of his earlier agricultural attributes. In Babylonian astrology, Ninurta was associated with the planet Saturn.

Ninurta was regarded as the son of the chief god Enlil and his main cult center in Sumer was the Eshumesha temple in Nippur. As Ninĝirsu, Ninurta was honored by King Gudea of Lagash (r. 2144–2124 BC). Later, Ninurta was revered as a formidable warrior by the Assyrians. The Assyrian king Ashurnasirpal II (r. 883–859 BC) had a large temple built for Ninurta at Kalhu which became the god's most important cult center.

In the epic poem Lugal-e, Ninurta slays the demon Asag using his talking mace Sharur and uses stones to build the Tigris and Euphrates rivers to make them useful for irrigation. In a poem sometimes referred to as the "Sumerian Georgica", Ninurta provides agricultural advice to farmers. In an Akkadian myth, he was the champion of the gods against the Anzû bird after it stole the Tablet of Destinies from his father Enlil. In a myth that is alluded to in many works but never fully preserved, he killed a group of warriors known as the "Slain Heroes". His major symbols were a perched bird and a plow.

It has been suggested that Ninurta was the inspiration for the figure of Nimrod, a "mighty hunter" who is mentioned in association with Kalhu in the Book of Genesis, although the view has been disputed.

== Worship ==
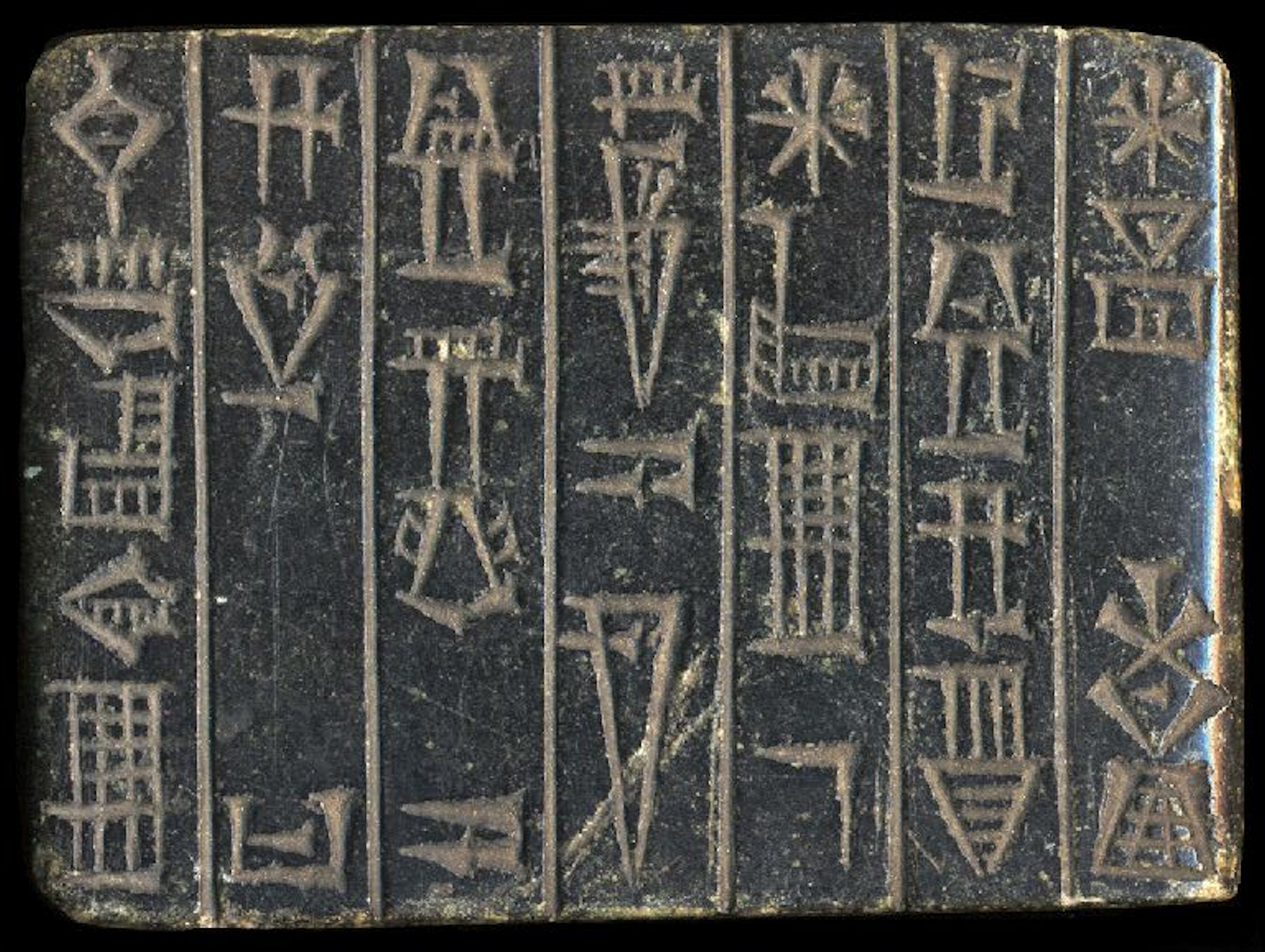
Gudea dedication tablet to God Ningirsu: "For Ningirsu, Enlil's mighty warrior, his Master; Gudea, ensi of Lagash"

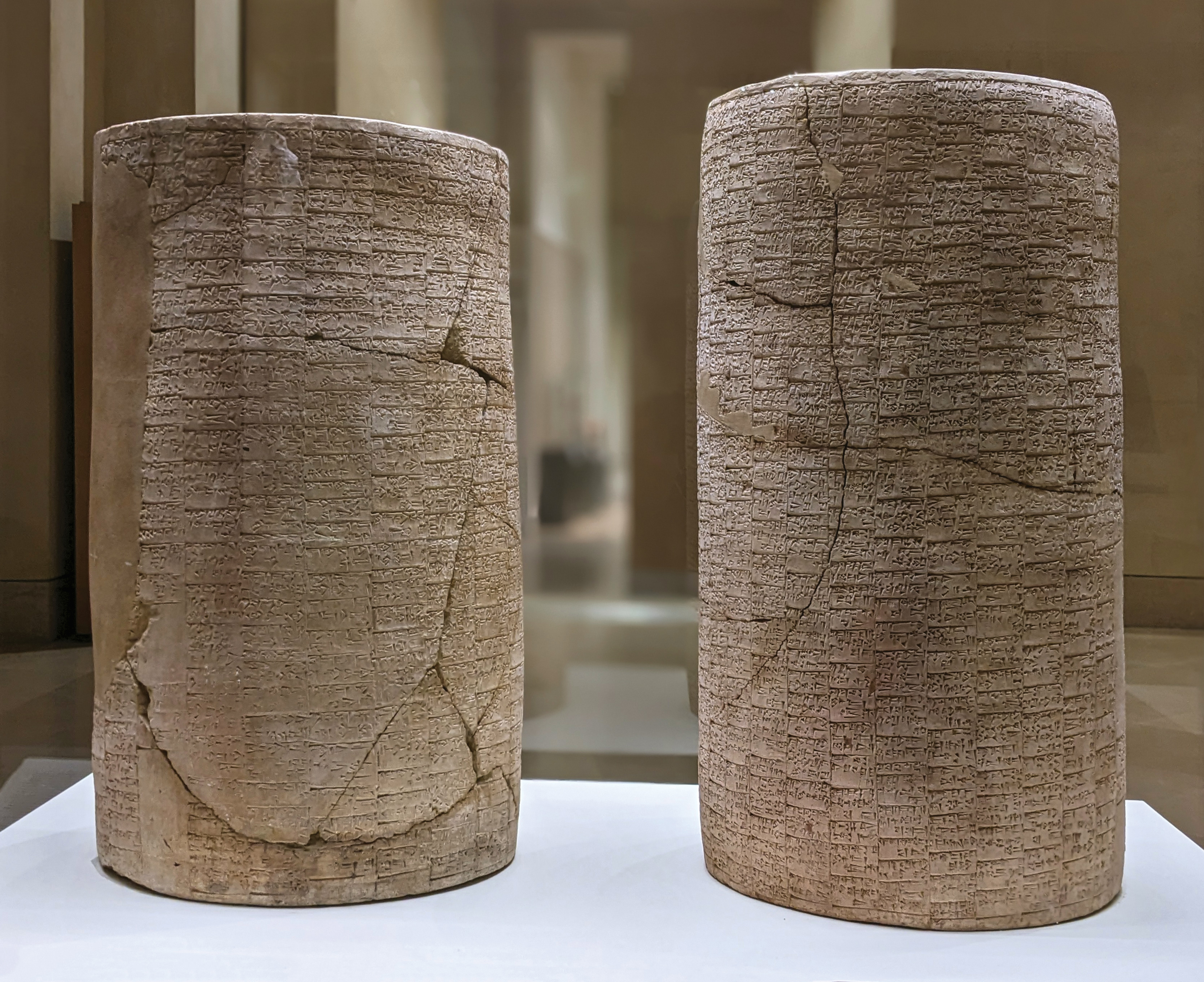
The Gudea cylinders, dating to c. 2125 BC, describe how King Gudea of Lagash rebuilt the temple of Ninĝirsu in Lagash as the result of a dream in which he was instructed to do so

Ninurta was worshipped in Mesopotamia as early as the middle of the third millennium BC by the ancient Sumerians, and is one of the earliest attested deities in the region. His main cult center was the Eshumesha temple in the Sumerian city-state of Nippur, where he was worshipped as the god of agriculture and the son of the chief-god Enlil. Though they may have originally been separate deities, in historical times, the god Ninĝirsu, who was worshipped in the Sumerian city-state of Girsu, was always identified as a local form of Ninurta. According to the Assyriologists Jeremy Black and Anthony Green, the two gods' personalities are "closely intertwined". As the city-state of Girsu declined in importance, Ninĝirsu became increasingly known as "Ninurta". He became primarily characterized by the aggressive, warlike aspect of his nature.

In later times, Ninurta's reputation as a fierce warrior made him immensely popular among the Assyrians. In the late second millennium BC, Assyrian kings frequently held names which included the name of Ninurta, such as Tukulti-Ninurta ("the trusted one of Ninurta"), Ninurta-apal-Ekur ("Ninurta is the heir of [Ellil's temple] Ekur"), and Ninurta-tukulti-Ashur ("Ninurta is the god Aššur's trusted one"). Tukulti-Ninurta I (ruled 1243–1207 BC) declares in one inscription that he hunts "at the command of the god Ninurta, who loves me." Similarly, Adad-nirari II (ruled 911–891 BC) claimed Ninurta and Aššur as supporters of his reign, declaring his destruction of their enemies as moral justification for his right to rule. In the ninth century BC, when Ashurnasirpal II (ruled 883–859 BC) moved the capital of the Assyrian Empire to Kalhu, the first temple he built there was one dedicated to Ninurta.

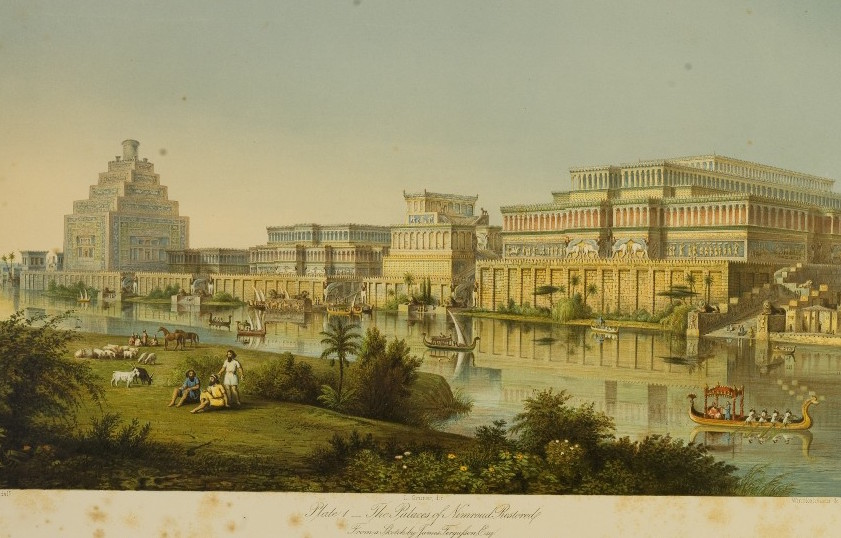
1853 restoration of what the city of Kalhu, Ninurta's main cult center in the Assyrian Empire, might have originally looked like, based on the excavations of the British archaeologist Austen Henry Layard there in the 1840s

The walls of the temple were decorated with stone relief carvings, including one of Ninurta slaying the Anzû bird. Ashurnasirpal II's son Shalmaneser III (ruled 859–824 BC) completed Ninurta's ziggurat at Kalhu and dedicated a stone relief of himself to the god. On the carving, Shalmaneser III's boasts of his military exploits and credits all his victories to Ninurta, declaring that, without Ninurta's aid, none of them would have been possible. When Adad-nirari III (ruled 811–783 BC) dedicated a new endowment to the temple of Aššur in Assur, they were sealed with both the seal of Aššur and the seal of Ninurta.

After the capital of Assyria was moved away from Kalhu, Ninurta's importance in the pantheon began to decline. Sargon II favored Nabu, the god of scribes, over Ninurta. Nonetheless, Ninurta still remained an important deity. Even after the kings of Assyria left Kalhu, the inhabitants of the former capital continued to venerate Ninurta, who they called "Ninurta residing in Kalhu". Legal documents from the city record that those who violated their oaths were required to "place two minas of silver and one mina of gold in the lap of Ninurta residing in Kalhu." The last attested example of this clause dates to 669 BC, the last year of the reign of King Esarhaddon (ruled 681 – 669 BC). The temple of Ninurta at Kalhu flourished until the end of the Assyrian Empire, hiring the poor and destitute as employees. The main cultic personnel were a šangû-priest and a chief singer, who were supported by a cook, a steward, and a porter. In the late seventh century BC, the temple staff witnessed legal documents, along with the staff of the temple of Nabu at Ezida. The two temples shared a qēpu-official.

== Iconography ==
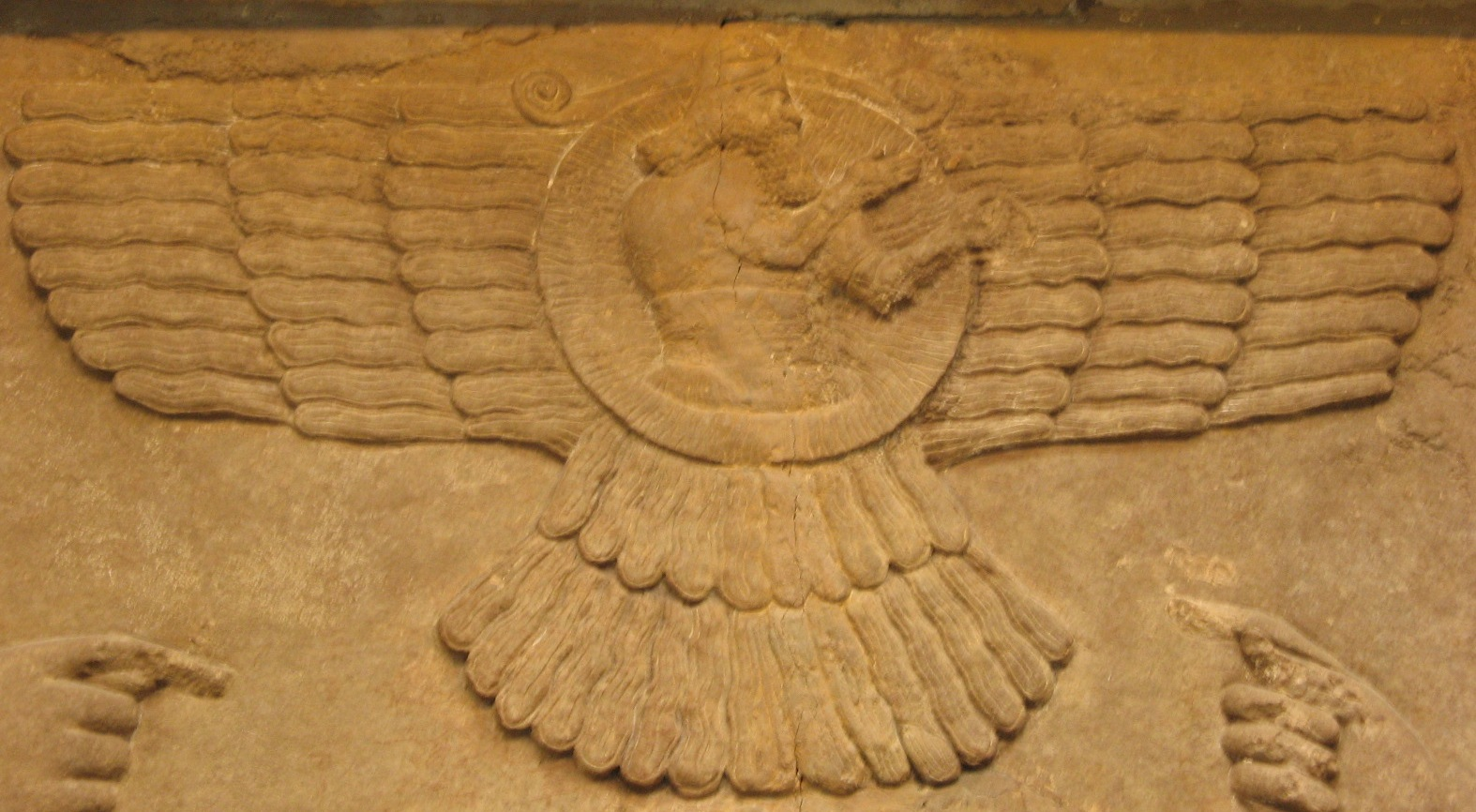
Male figure in an Assyrian winged sun emblem from the Northwest Palace at Kalhu; some authors have speculated that this figure may be Ninurta, but most scholars reject this assertion as unfounded

On kudurrus from the Kassite Period (c. 1600 – c. 1155 BC), a plough is captioned as a symbol of Ninĝirsu. The plough also appears in Neo-Assyrian art, possibly as a symbol of Ninurta. A perched bird is also used as a symbol of Ninurta during the Neo-Assyrian Period. One speculative hypothesis holds that the winged disc originally symbolized Ninurta during the ninth century BC, but was later transferred to Aššur and the sun-god Shamash. This idea is based on some early representations in which the god on the winged disc appears to have the tail of a bird. Most scholars have rejected this suggestion as unfounded. Astronomers of the eighth and seventh centuries BC identified Ninurta (or Pabilsaĝ) with the constellation Sagittarius. Alternatively, others identified him with the star Sirius, which was known in Akkadian as šukūdu, meaning "arrow". The constellation of Canis Major, of which Sirius is the most visible star, was known as qaštu, meaning "bow", after the bow and arrow Ninurta was believed to carry. In the MUL.APIN Ninurta is consistently identified with Mercury, as it is read: "Mercury whose name is Ninurta travels the (same) path the Moon travels." However, in Babylonian times, Ninurta was associated with the planet Saturn, while Mercury became associated with Nabu.

== Family ==
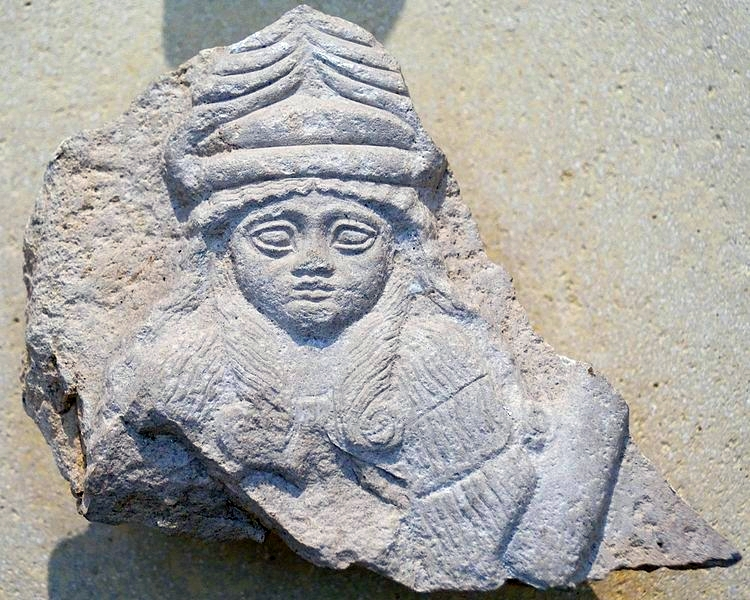
Limestone bust of a goddess from Girsu, possibly Ninurta's consort Bau, wearing a horned cap

Ninurta was believed to be the son of Enlil. In Lugal-e, his mother is identified as the goddess Ninmah, whom he renames Ninhursag, but, in Angim dimma, his mother is instead the goddess Ninlil. Under the name Ninurta, his wife is usually the goddess Gula, but, as Ninĝirsu, his wife is the goddess Bau. Gula was the goddess of healing and medicine and she was sometimes alternately said to be the wife of the god Pabilsaĝ or the minor vegetation god Abu. Bau was worshipped "almost exclusively in Lagash" and was sometimes alternately identified as the wife of the god Zababa. She and Ninĝirsu were believed to have two sons: the gods Ig-alima and Šul-šagana. Bau also had seven daughters, but Ninĝirsu was not claimed to be their father. As the son of Enlil, Ninurta's siblings include: Nanna, Nergal, Ninazu, Enbilulu, and sometimes Inanna.

== Mythology ==
=== Lugal-e ===
Second only to the goddess Inanna, Ninurta probably appears in more myths than any other Mesopotamian deity. In the Sumerian poem Lugal-e, also known as Ninurta's Exploits, a demon known as Asag has been causing sickness and poisoning the rivers. Ninurta confronts Asag, who is protected by an army of stone warriors. Ninurta slays Asag and his armies. Then Ninurta organizes the world, using the stones from the warriors he has defeated to build the mountains, which he designs so that the streams, lakes and rivers all flow into the Tigris and Euphrates rivers, making them useful for irrigation and agriculture. Ninurta's mother Ninmah descends from Heaven to congratulate her son on his victory. Ninurta dedicates the mountain of stone to her and renames her Ninhursag, meaning "Lady of the Mountain". Finally, Ninurta returns home to Nippur, where he is celebrated as a hero. This myth combines Ninurta's role as a warrior deity with his role as an agricultural deity. The title Lugal-e means "O king!" and comes from the poem opening phrase in the original Sumerian. Ninurta's Exploits is a modern title assigned to it by scholars. The poem was eventually translated into Akkadian after Sumerian became regarded as too difficult to understand.

A companion work to the Lugal-e is Angim dimma, or Ninurta's Return to Nippur, which describes Ninurta's return to Nippur after slaying Asag. It contains little narrative and is mostly a praise piece, describing Ninurta in larger-than-life terms and comparing him to the god An. Angim dimma is believed to have originally been written in Sumerian during the Third Dynasty of Ur (c. 2112 – c. 2004 BC) or the early Old Babylonian Period (c. 1830 – c. 1531 BC), but the oldest surviving texts of it date to Old Babylonian Period. Numerous later versions of the text have also survived. It was translated into Akkadian during the Middle Babylonian Period (c. 1600 — c. 1155 BC).

=== Anzû myth ===
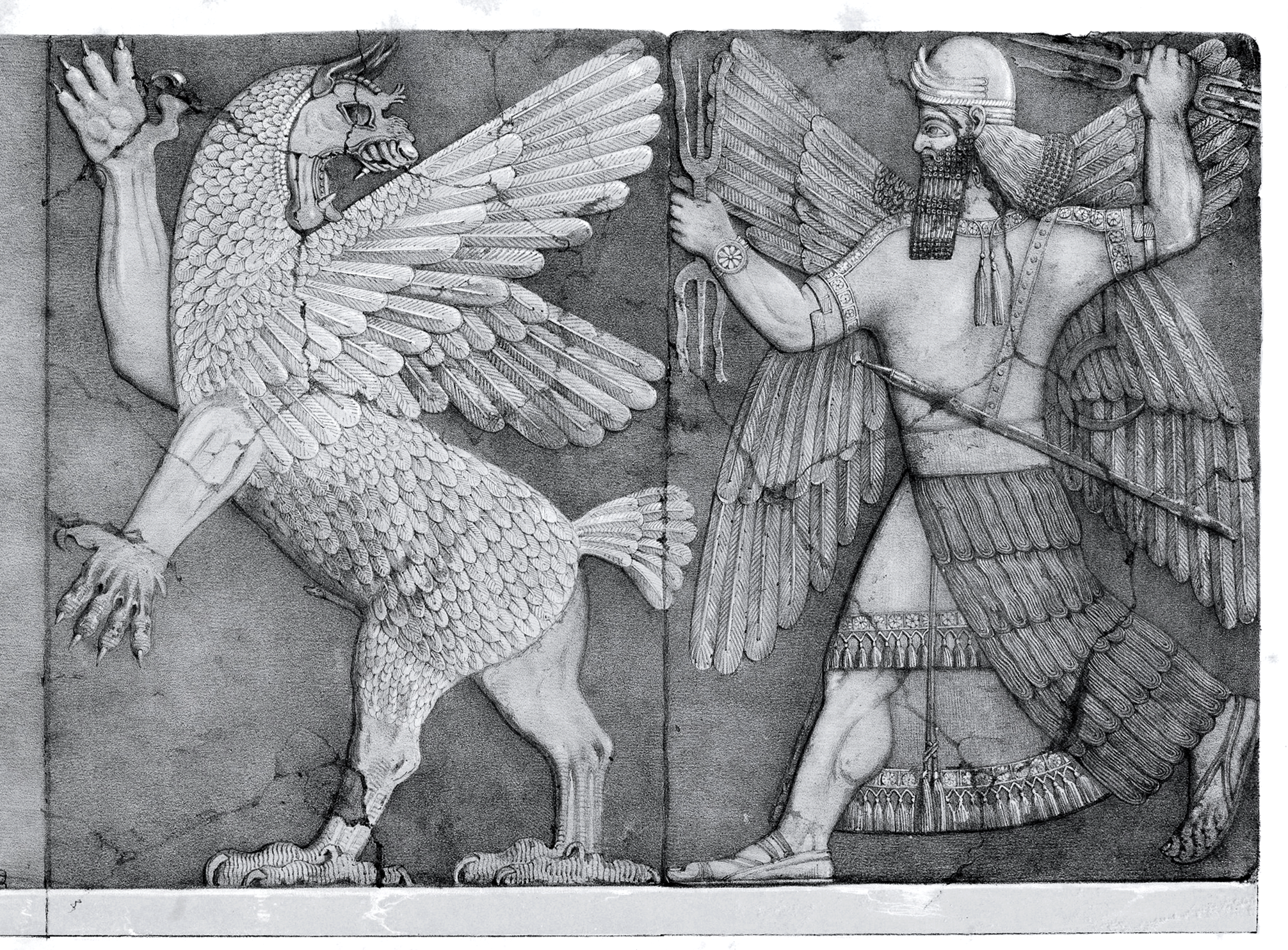
Ninurta with his thunderbolts pursues Anzû, who has stolen the Tablet of Destinies from Enlil's sanctuary (Austen Henry Layard Monuments of Nineveh, 2nd Series, 1853)

In the Old, Middle, and Late Babylonian myth of Anzû and the Tablet of Destinies, the Anzû is a giant, monstrous bird. Enlil gives Anzû a position as the guardian of his sanctuary, but Anzû betrays Enlil and steals the Tablet of Destinies, a sacred clay tablet belonging to Enlil that grants him his authority, while Enlil is preparing for his bath. The rivers dry up and the gods are stripped of their powers. The gods send Adad, Girra, and Shara to defeat the Anzû, but all of them fail. Finally, the god Ea proposes that the gods should send Ninurta, Enlil's son. Ninurta confronts the Anzû and shoots it with his arrows, but the Tablet of Destinies has the power to reverse time and the Anzû uses this power to make Ninurta's arrows fall apart in midair and revert to their original components.

Ninurta calls upon the south wind for aid, which rips the Anzû's wings off. The god Dagan announces Ninurta's victory in the assembly of the gods and, as a reward, Ninurta is granted a prominent seat on the council. Enlil sends the messenger god Birdu to request Ninurta to return the Tablet of Destinies. Ninurta's reply to Birdu is fragmentary, but it is possible he may initially refuse to return the Tablet. In the end, however, Ninurta does return the Tablet of Destinies to his father. This story was particularly popular among scholars of the Assyrian royal court.

The myth of Ninurta and the Turtle, recorded in UET 6/1 2, is a fragment of what was originally a much longer literary composition. In it, after defeating the Anzû, Ninurta is honored by Enki in Eridu. Enki senses his thoughts and creates a giant turtle, which he releases behind Ninurta and which bites the hero's ankle. As they struggle, the turtle digs a pit with its claws, which both of them fall into. Enki gloats over Ninurta's defeat. The end of the story is missing; the last legible portion of the account is a lamentation from Ninurta's mother Ninmah, who seems to be considering finding a substitute for her son. According to Charles Penglase, in this account, Enki is clearly intended as the hero and his successful foiling of Ninurta's plot to seize power for himself is intended as a demonstration of Enki's supreme wisdom and cunning.

=== Other myths ===
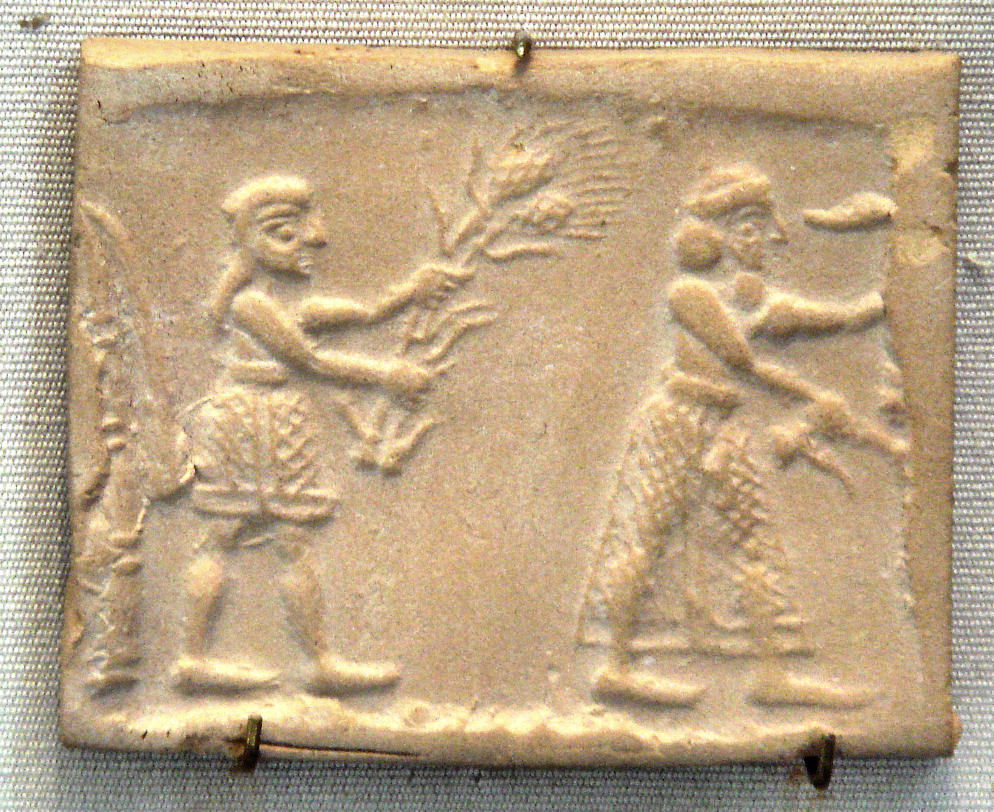
Sumerian cylinder seal impression dating to c. 3200 BC showing an ensi and his acolyte feeding a sacred herd; Ninurta was an agricultural deity and, in a poem known as the "Sumerian Georgica", he offers detailed advice on farming

In Ninurta's Journey to Eridu, Ninurta leaves the Ekur temple in Nippur and travels to the Abzu in Eridu, led by an unnamed guide. In Eridu, Ninurta sits in assembly with the gods An and Enki and Enki gives him the me for life. The poem ends with Ninurta returning to Nippur. The account probably deals with a journey in which Ninurta's cult statue was transported from one city to another and the "guide" is the person carrying the cult statue. The story closely resembles the other Sumerian myth of Inanna and Enki, in which the goddess Inanna journeys to Eridu and receives the mes from Enki. In a poem known as the "Sumerian Georgica", written sometime between 1700 and 1500 BC, Ninurta delivers detailed advice on agricultural matters, including how to plant, tend, and harvest crops, how to prepare fields for planting, and even how to drive birds away from the crops. The poem covers nearly every aspect of farm life throughout the course of the year.

The myth of the Slain Heroes is alluded to in many texts, but is never preserved in full. In this myth, Ninurta must fight a variety of opponents. Black and Green describe these opponents as "bizarre minor deities"; they include the six-headed Wild Ram, the Palm Tree King, the seven-headed serpent and the Kulianna the Mermaid (or "fish-woman"). Some of these foes are inanimate objects, such as the Magillum Boat, which carries the souls of the dead to the Underworld, and the strong copper, which represents a metal that was conceived as precious. This story of successive trials and victories may have been the source for the Greek legend of the Twelve Labors of Heracles.

== Later influence ==
=== In antiquity ===
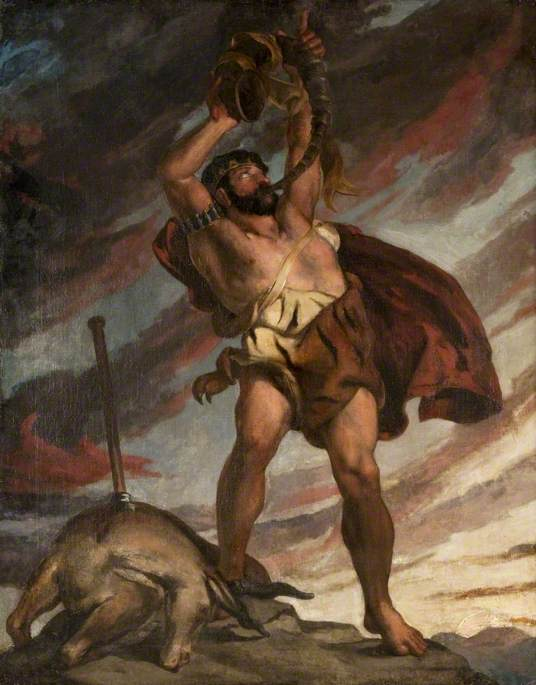
Nimrod (1832) by David Scott. Nimrod, the "great hunter" mentioned in Genesis 10:8–12, is believed by many scholars to be inspired by either Ninurta himself or the Assyrian king Tukulti-Ninurta I, named after him

In the late seventh century BC, Kalhu was captured by foreign invaders. Despite this, Ninurta was never completely forgotten. Many scholars agree that Ninurta was probably the inspiration for the biblical figure Nimrod, mentioned in Genesis 10:8–12 as a "mighty hunter". Though it is still not entirely clear how the name Ninurta became Nimrod in Hebrew, the two figures bear mostly the same functions and attributes and Ninurta is currently regarded as the most plausible etymology for Nimrod's name. Eventually, the ruins of the city of Kalhu itself became known in Arabic as Namrūd because of its association with Ninurta.

Later in the Old Testament, in both 2 Kings 19:37 and Isaiah 37:38, King Sennacherib of Assyria is reported to have been murdered by his sons Adrammelech and Sharezer in the temple of "Nisroch", which is most likely a scribal error for "Nimrod". This hypothetical error would result from the Hebrew letter מ (mem) being replacing with ס (samekh) and the letter ד (dalet) being replaced with ך (kaf). Due to the obvious visual similarities of the letters involved and the fact that no Assyrian deity by the name of "Nisroch" has ever been attested, most scholars consider this error to be the most likely explanation for the name. If "Nisroch" is Ninurta, this would make Ninurta's temple at Kalhu the most likely location of Sennacherib's murder. Other scholars have attempted to identify Nisroch as Nusku, the Assyrian god of fire. Hans Wildberger rejects all suggested identifications as linguistically implausible.

Although the Book of Genesis itself portrays Nimrod positively as the first king after the Flood of Noah and a builder of cities, the Greek Septuagint translation of the Hebrew Bible refers to him as a giant and mistranslates the Hebrew words meaning "before Yahweh" as "in opposition against God." Because of this, Nimrod became envisioned as the archetypal idolator. Early works of Jewish midrash, described by the first-century AD philosopher Philo in his Quaestiones, portrayed Nimrod as the instigator of the building of the Tower of Babel, who persecuted the Jewish patriarch Abraham for refusing to participate in the project. Saint Augustine of Hippo refers to Nimrod in his book The City of God as "a deceiver, oppressor and destroyer of earth-born creatures."

=== In modernity ===
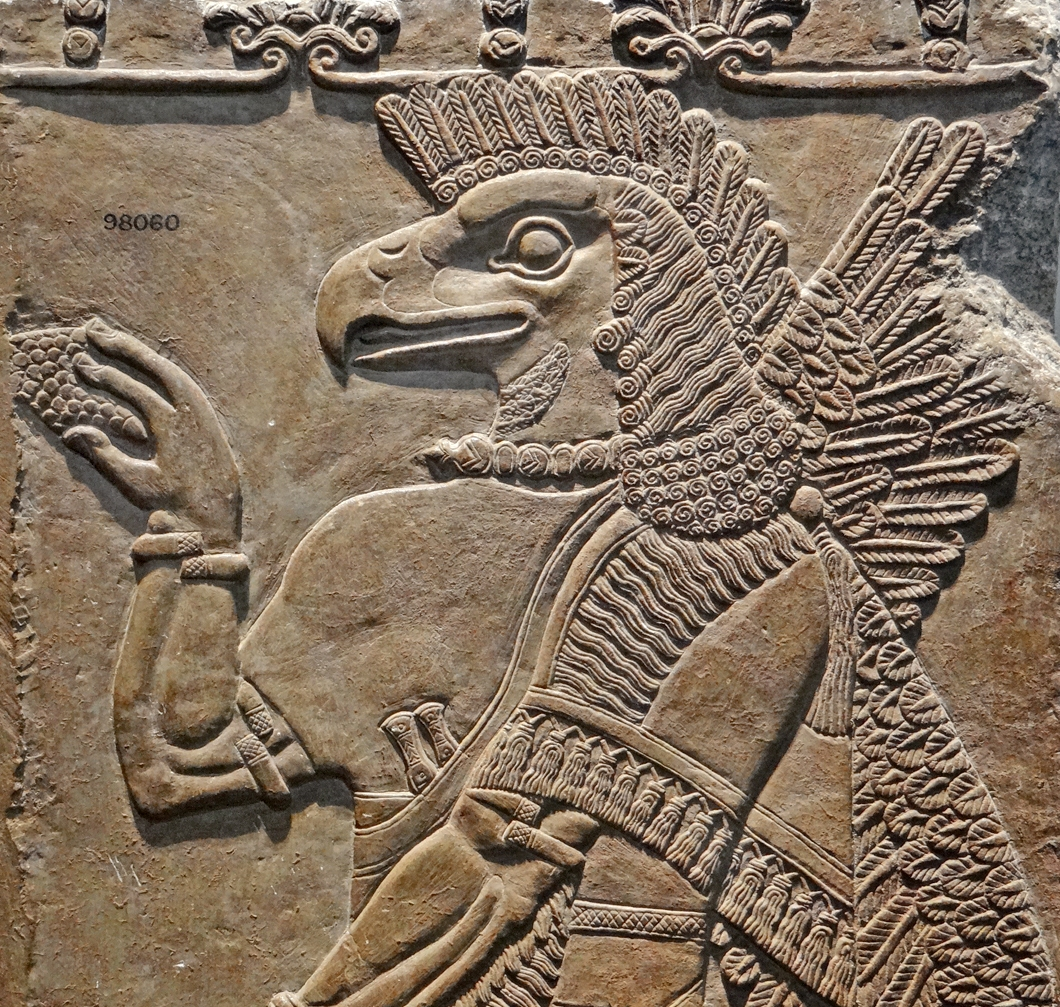
Stone relief carving of an eagle-headed genius from the temple of Ninurta at Kalhu; such depictions were widely, but erroneously, identified as Ninurta in the nineteenth century and were popularly known as "Nisrochs"

In the sixteenth century, Nisroch became seen as a demon. The Dutch demonologist Johann Weyer listed Nisroch in his Pseudomonarchia Daemonum (1577) as the "chief cook" of Hell. Nisroch appears in Book VI of John Milton's epic poem Paradise Lost (first published in 1667) as one of Satan's demons. Nisroch, who is described as frowning and wearing beaten armor, calls into question Satan's argument that the fight between the angels and demons is equal, objecting that they, as demons, can feel pain, which will break their morale. According to Milton scholar Roy Flannagan, Milton may have chosen to portray Nisroch as timid because he had consulted the Hebrew dictionary of C. Stephanus, which defined the name "Nisroch" as "Flight" or "Delicate Temptation".

In the 1840s, the British archaeologist Austen Henry Layard uncovered numerous stone carvings of winged, eagle-headed genii at Kalhu. Remembering the Biblical story of Sennacherib's murder, Layard mistakenly identified these figures as "Nisrochs". Such carvings continued to be known as "Nisrochs" in popular literature throughout the remaining portion of the nineteenth century. In Edith Nesbit's classic 1906 children's novel The Story of the Amulet, the child protagonists summon an eagle-headed "Nisroch" to guide them. Nisroch opens a portal and advises them, "Walk forward without fear" and asks, "Is there aught else that the Servant of the great Name can do for those who speak that name?" Some modern works on art history still repeat the old misidentification, but Near Eastern scholars now generally refer to the "Nisroch" figure as a "griffin-demon".

In 2016, during its brief conquest of the region, the Islamic State of Iraq and the Levant (ISIL) demolished Ashurnasirpal II's ziggurat of Ninurta at Kalhu. This act was in line with ISIL's longstanding policy of destroying any ancient ruins which it deemed incompatible with its militant interpretation of Islam. According to a statement from the American Schools of Oriental Research (ASOR)'s Cultural Heritage Initiatives, ISIL may have destroyed the temple to use its destruction for future propaganda and to demoralize the local population.

In March 2020, archaeologists announced the discovery of a 5,000-year-old cultic area filled with more than 300 broken ceremonial ceramic cups, bowls, jars, animal bones and ritual processions dedicated to Ningirsu at the site of Girsu. One of the remains was a duck-shaped bronze figurine with eyes made from bark which is thought to be dedicated to Nanshe.

In February 2023, the E-ninnu temple (Temple of the White Thunderbird), the primary sanctuary of Ningirsu was identified during the excavations led by British Museum and Getty Museum archaeologists at the site of Girsu.

== See also ==
- Kajamanu
