= Anzû =

Ancient Mesopotamian deity

Anzû 𒀭𒅎𒂂
- Divine monster
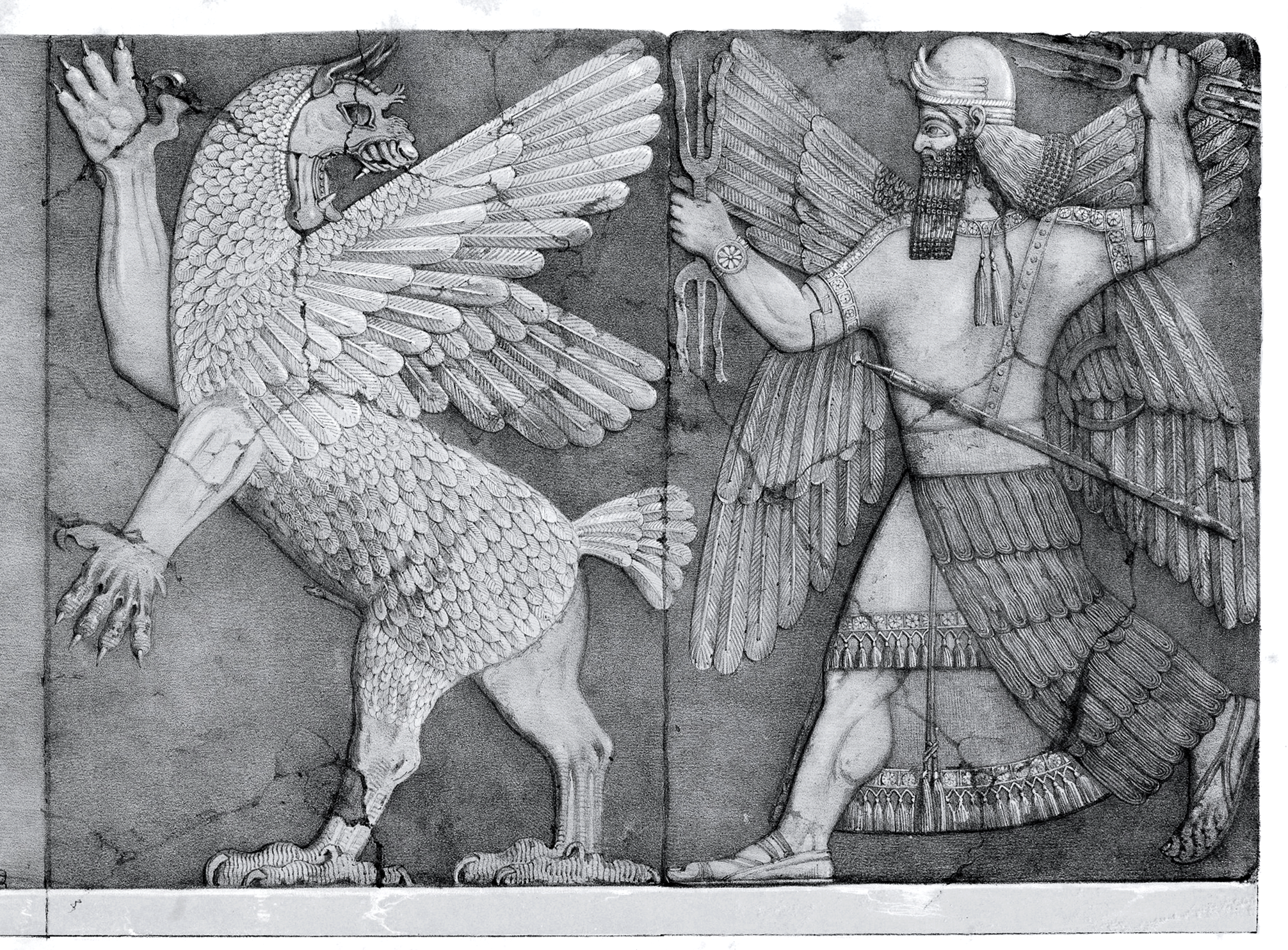
- Ninurta with his thunderbolts pursues Anzû stealing the Tablet of Destinies from Enlil's sanctuary (Austen Henry Layard Monuments of Nineveh, 2nd Series, 1853)
- Parents: Siris

Anzû, also known as ^{d}Zû and Imdugud (Sumerian: 𒀭𒅎𒂂 ^{d}im.dugud^{mušen}), is a demon in several Mesopotamian religions. He was conceived by the cosmic freshwater ocean Abzu and mother Earth Mami, or as son of Siris. In Babylonian myths Anzû was depicted as a massive bird - also as an eagle with lion head - who can breathe fire and water. This narrative seems to refer to much earlier Sumerian myths, in which he appears as a half-human storm bird who stole the tablet of destiny, challenging Enlil's power over his organisation of different gods that provided Mesopotamia with agriculture (cf. the Flood epic Athrahasis).

Stephanie Dalley, in Myths from Mesopotamia, writes that the Epic of Anzu itself "is principally known in two versions: an Old Babylonian version of the early second millennium [BC], giving the hero as Ningirsu; and 'The Standard Babylonian' version, dating to the first millennium BC, which appears to be the most quoted version, with the hero as Ninurta". However, the Anzu character does not appear as often in some other writings, as noted below.

== Name ==
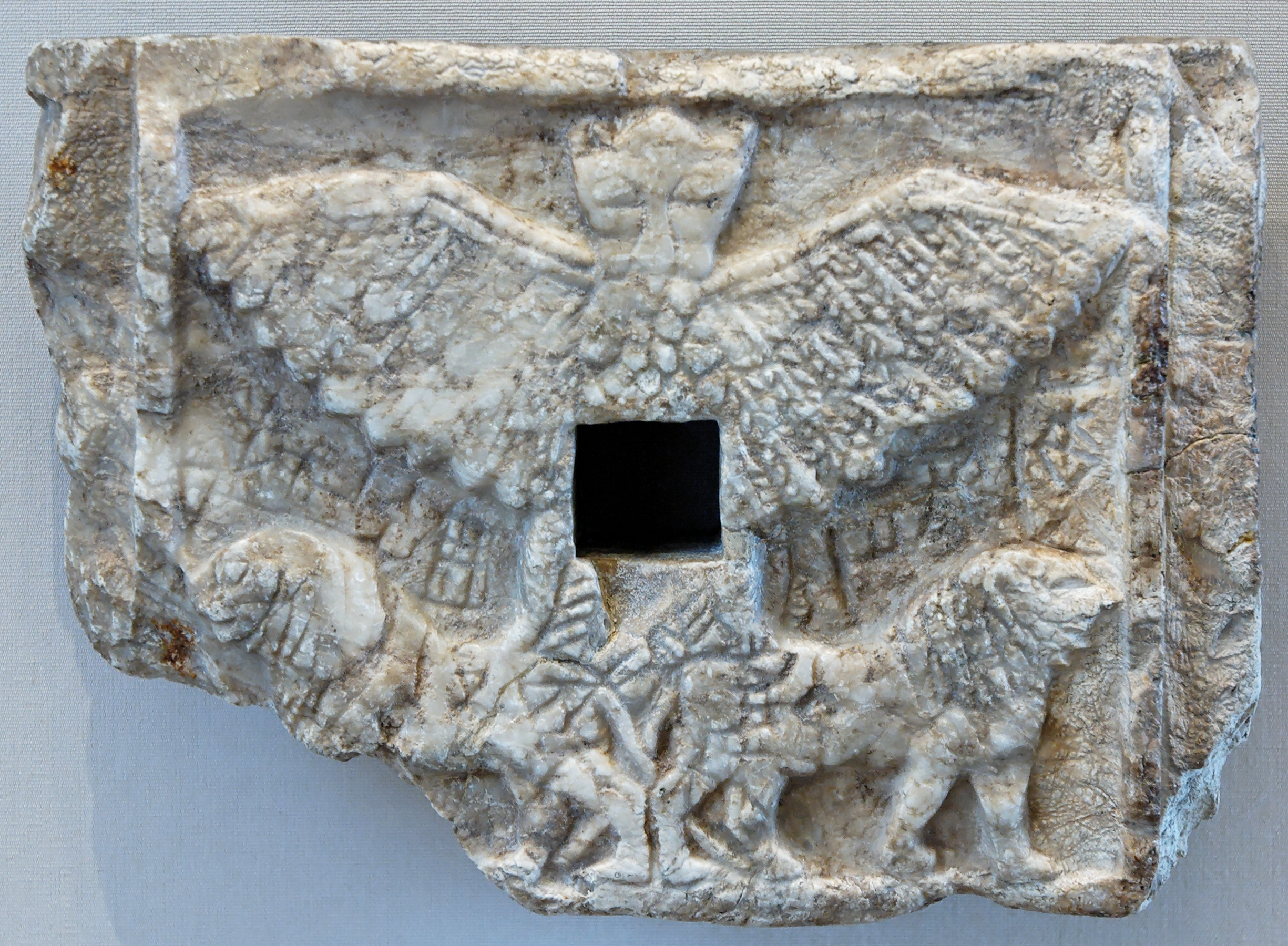
Alabaster votive relief of Ur-Nanshe, king of Lagash, showing Anzû as a lion-headed eagle in a Master of Animals motif, ca. 2550–2500 BC; found at Tell Telloh the ancient city of Girsu (Louvre)

The name of the mythological being usually called Anzû was actually written in the oldest Sumerian cuneiform texts as 𒀭𒉎𒈪𒄷 (an.im.mi^{mušen}; in context, the cuneiform sign 𒄷, or mušen, is an ideogram for "bird"). In texts of the Old Babylonian period, the name is more often found as 𒀭𒉎𒂂𒄷 an.im.dugud^{mušen}. In 1961, Landsberger argued that this name should be read as "Anzu", and most researchers have followed suit. In 1989, Thorkild Jacobsen noted that the original reading of the cuneiform signs as written (giving the name "^{d}im.dugud") is also valid, and was probably the original pronunciation of the name, with Anzu derived from an early phonetic variant. Similar phonetic changes happened to parallel terms, such as imdugud (meaning "heavy wind") becoming ansuk. Changes like these occurred by evolution of the im to an (a common phonetic change) and the blending of the new n with the following d, which was aspirated as dh, a sound which was borrowed into Akkadian as z or s.

It has also been argued based on contextual evidence and transliterations on cuneiform learning tablets, that the earliest, Sumerian form of the name was at least sometimes also pronounced Zu, and that Anzu is primarily the Akkadian form of the name. However, there is evidence for both readings of the name in both languages, and the issue is confused further by the fact that the prefix 𒀭 (an) was often used to distinguish deities or even simply high places. an.zu could therefore mean simply "heavenly eagle".

== Origin and cultural evolution ==
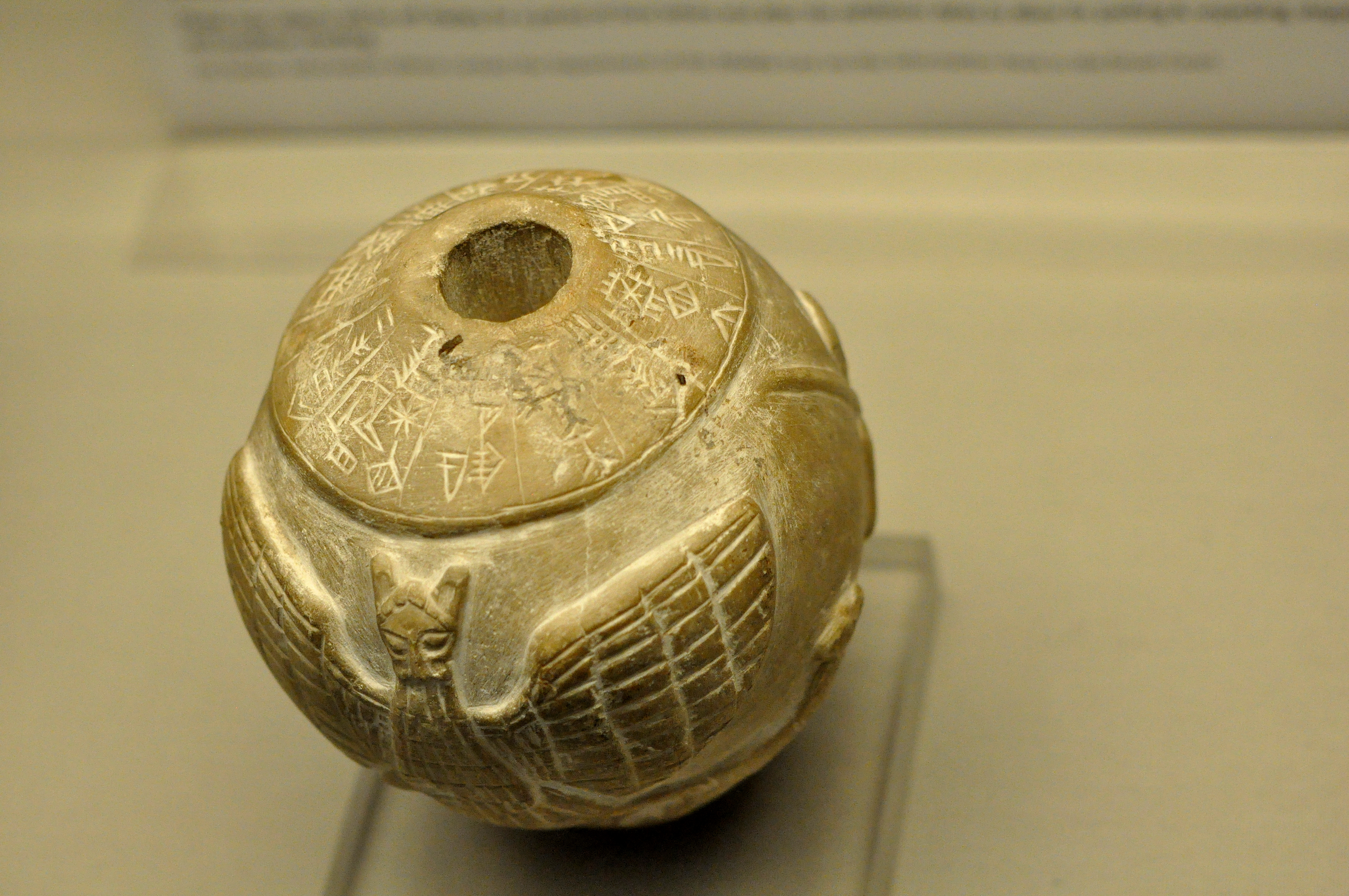
Inscribed head of a mace with Imdugud (Anzu) and Enannatum, the British Museum, London.

Thorkild Jacobsen proposed that Anzu was an early form of the god Abu, who was also syncretized by the ancients with Ninurta/Ningirsu, a god associated with thunderstorms. Abu was referred to as "Father Pasture", illustrating the connection between rainstorms and the fields growing in Spring. According to Jacobsen, this god was originally envisioned as a huge black thundercloud in the shape of an eagle, and was later depicted with a lion's head to connect it to the roar of thunder. Some depictions of Anzu therefore depict the god alongside goats (which, like thunderclouds, were associated with mountains in the ancient Near East) and leafy boughs. The connection between Anzu and Abu is further reinforced by a statue found in the Tell Asmar Hoard depicting a human figure with large eyes, with an Anzu bird carved on the base. It is likely that this depicts Anzu in his symbolic or earthly form as the Anzu-bird, and in his higher, human-like divine form as Abu. Though some scholars have proposed that the statue actually represents a human worshiper of Anzu, others have pointed out that it does not fit the usual depiction of Sumerian worshipers, but instead matches similar statues of gods in human form with their more abstract form or their symbols carved onto the base.

== Sumerian and Akkadian myth ==
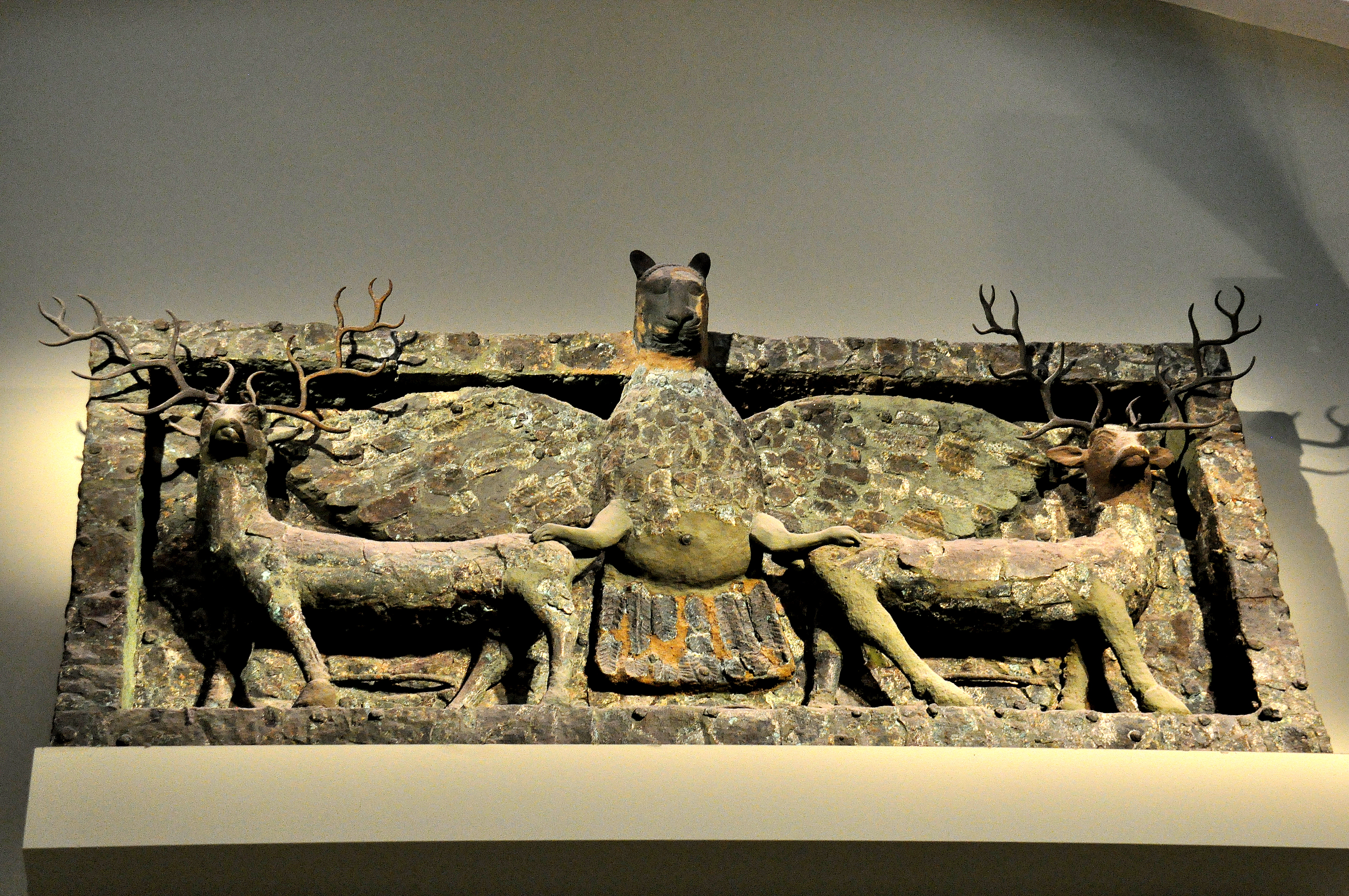
Frieze of Imdugud (Anzu) grasping a pair of deer, from Tell al-'Ubaid.

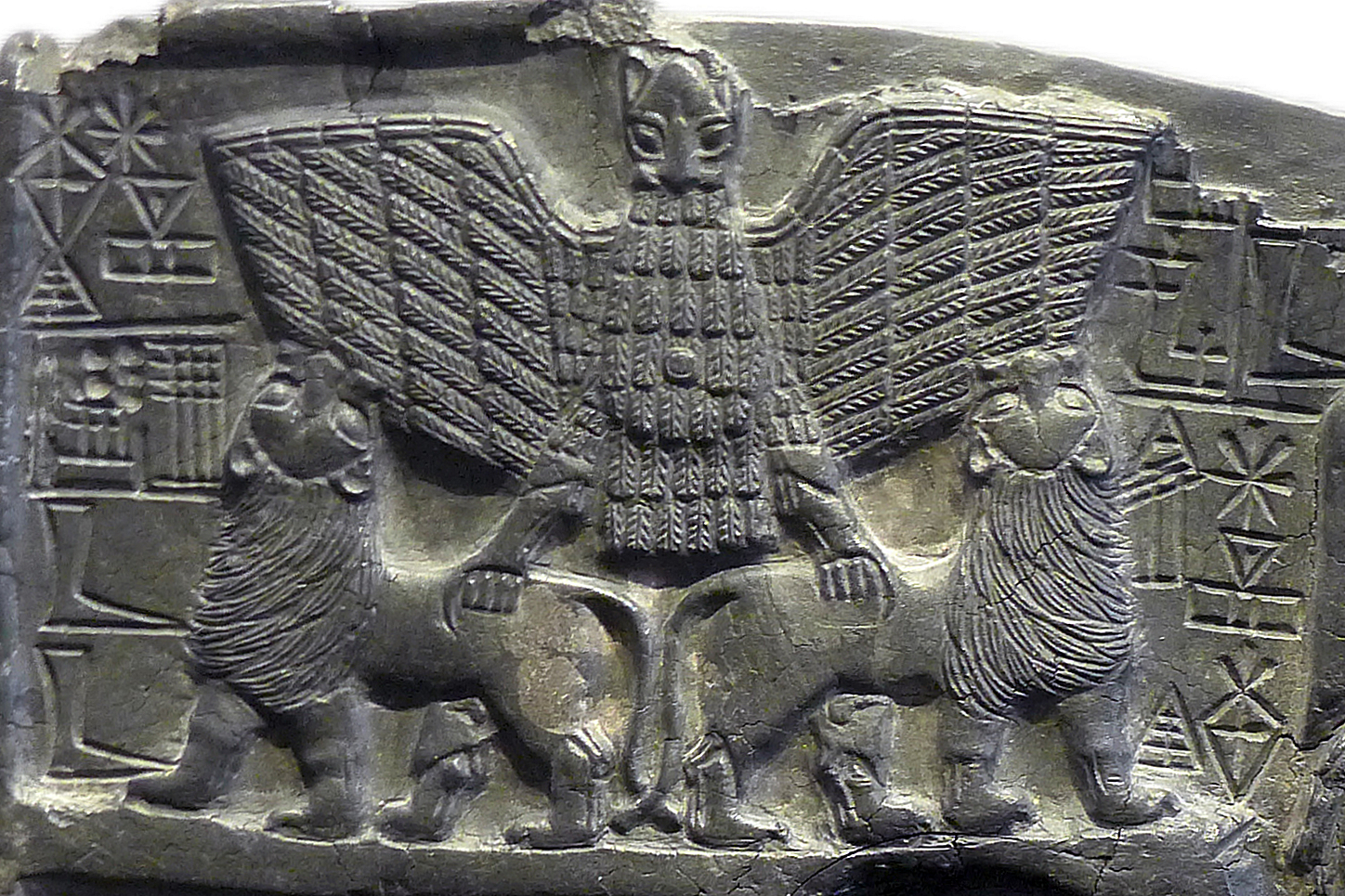
The Anzû, symbol of Lagash, at the time of Entemena.

In Sumerian and Akkadian mythology, Anzû is a divine storm-bird and the personification of the southern wind and the thunder clouds. This demon—half man and half bird—stole the "Tablet of Destinies" from Enlil and hid them on a mountaintop. Anu ordered the other gods to retrieve the tablet, even though they all feared the demon. According to one text, Marduk killed the bird; in another, it died through the arrows of the god Ninurta.

Anzu also appears in the story of "Inanna and the Huluppu Tree", which is recorded in the preamble to the Sumerian epic poem Gilgamesh, Enkidu, and the Netherworld.

Anzu appears in the Sumerian Lugalbanda and the Anzud Bird (also called: The Return of Lugalbanda).

== Babylonian and Assyrian myth ==
The shorter Old Babylonian version was found at Susa. Full version in Myths from Mesopotamia: Creation, The Flood, Gilgamesh, and Others by Stephanie Dalley, page 222 and at The Epic of Anzû, Old Babylonian version from Susa, Tablet II, lines 1-83, read by Claus Wilcke. The longer Late Assyrian version from Nineveh is most commonly called The Myth of Anzu. (Full version in Dalley, page 205). An edited version is at Myth of Anzu. Latest editions of the Old Babylonian, Standard Babylonian and Neo-Assyrian (Late Assyrian) versions of the myth are published in the electronic Babylonian Library.

== Literary References ==
- In Faith Hunter's Jane Yellowrock urban fantasy books, the major character Girard DiMercy is an anzu, a bird-like magical species considered by ancient Babylonians as avatars of the storm god and that can take the shape of a human. In the novels, anzu have a symbiotic relationship with vampires, helping them control their unstable emotions as well as saving masters from killing vampire scions who fail to emerge from a feral state after being turned. In addition to being vampire Master of the City Leo Pellosier's "Mercy Blade," DiMercy serves as the Executioner for the Master of the City.

== See also ==
- Anzu wyliei, a theropod dinosaur named for Anzû
- Asag, similar Mesopotamian deity
- Griffin or griffon, lion-bird hybrid
- Lamassu, Assyrian deity, bull/lion-eagle-human hybrid
- Tengu, Japanese magical creature half-man half-bird
- Hybrid beasts in folklore
- List of hybrid creatures in folklore
- Tiamat
- Ziz, giant griffin-like bird in Jewish mythology
- Zeus, Greek deity of sky and thunder
- Zuism, Icelander protest against tax for religion
