= Haya (god) =

Mesopotamian god

- God of scribal arts
- Major cult center: Ur

Genealogy
- Spouse: Nisaba
- Children: Sud

Haya was a Mesopotamian god associated with scribal arts and possibly with grain. He was considered to be husband of Nisaba and father of Sud. He was also associated with Enlil, both as his father-in-law and an official in his service. He was worshiped in Ur, Umma, Kuara, Nippur, Shaduppum and later on also in Assur and possibly Nineveh. He is sparsely attested in literary texts, with only a single known hymn being dedicated to him. He also plays a minor role in the myth Enlil and Sud.

== Name ==
Haya's name was written in cuneiform as ^{d}Ḫa-ià (𒀭𒄩𒉌). In addition to Haya, romanizations with a breve are also in use, including Ḫaya, Ḫaja and Ḫaia. The reading Hani is no longer considered to be correct. It is possible that sometimes Haya's name was written logographically as NAĜAR, though this sign could also be read as a variety of other theonyms, for example Alla and Ninildu.

It is commonly assumed Haya's name originated in a Semitic language. Miguel Civil suggested in 1983 that it was a cognate of the theonym Ea, though he noted these two gods were considered separate in Old Babylonian sources. He also remarked that Haya was already actively worshiped and appears in offering lists at a time when the only evidence of Ea were theophoric names. As of 2016, the proposal that a connection existed between Haya and Ea (and by extension with Eblaite Hayya) was still considered plausible, though it is not universally accepted. It is also uncertain if a homophonous element of names from Mari, written without the dingir sign used as a determinative to designate theonyms, is related to Haya's name. Jean-Marie Durand argues that it referred to a different deity, though one whose name was also derived from the same root meaning "to live" like Ea's.

In the god list An = Anum (tablet I, line 276), Haya is provided with a second name, Lugalkisa'a (Lugalkisia), "lord of the retaining wall", though in the Old Babylonian forerunner to this composition and in offering lists from the Ur III period this theonym designates an unrelated doorkeeper deity instead.

== Character ==
Ḫaya was a minor god, and is overall less well attested than his wife Nisaba. It is assumed that he shared many of her traits. He was associated with the scribal arts, and was described as a wise divine accountant and archivist. An unidentified tool, possibly a writing implement, giš ^{d}ḫa-ià, was apparently named after him. Francesco Pomponio suggests that he also functioned as the god of seals.

Marcos Such-Gutiérrez characterizes Haya as a grain god. However, according to Mark Weeden the only evidence in favor of this interpretation are "etymological considerations", which he notes might not be fully reliable.

An Old Babylonian text from Nippur indicates that the peacock was referred to as ^{d}ḫa-ià^{mušen}, but no connection between this bird and any aspects of the god's character has been established so far.

== Associations with other deities ==
Haya was regarded as the husband of Nisaba, the goddess of writing. This connection is well attested in sources from the Old Babylonian period. The exorcism formula Gattung II invokes Haya alongside Nisaba, and describes him as the "solidifier of the boundaries of vast heaven". The god list An = Anu ša amēli equates ^{d}Ḫa-a-a, according to Andrew R. George identical with Haya, with Nisaba, and explains this name as "Nisaba of riches" (ša maš-re-e). (Note: However, Dietz Otto Edzard instead assumed that this theonym might have only been associated or confused with Haya's name.)

The goddess Sud, who was equated with Ninlil and as such functioned as the spouse of Enlil, was regarded as a daughter of Haya and Nisaba. As a result, Haya was regarded as the father-in-law of Enlil. He was also his steward (agrig).

An Old Babylonian hymn dedicated to Haya equates him with Indagara, the husband of the goddess Kusu. Indagara is sometimes treated in modern scholarship simply as an alternate name of Haya. However, the later god list An = Anum instead equates him with Ishkur. In the hymn, Indagara/Haya and Kusu are collectively referred to as "the continual providers of the great meals of An and Enlil in their grand dining-hall."

In a god list from Emar which assigns Hurrian equivalents to Mesopotamian deities Haya corresponds to a poorly known Hurrian deity named ^{d}Še-ra-am-mi-na.

An alternate name of the Hattian grain goddess Kait, written ḫa-i-a-am-ma, might have been derived from Haya, though it might also have a presently unknown Hattic etymology.

== Worship ==
The earliest known reference to Haya has been identified on a school tablet from Shuruppak the Early Dynastic period, though the context in which his name occurs on it remains uncertain. He also occurs in texts from Adab from the Old Akkadian period, though only in theophoric names, such as Lu-Haya and Ur-Haya. More attestations are available from the Ur III period, during which Haya is particularly well represented in texts from Ur. A hymn from the reign of Rim-Sîn I of Larsa also associates him with his city, and states that he was believed to dwell in the Ekišnugal, the temple of the moon god Nanna. Further locations he is attested in the third millennium BCE include Umma and Kuara. He is also well documented as a member of the pantheon of Nippur both in the Ur III and Old Babylonian periods. Excavations additionally indicate that in the Old Babylonian period a temple dedicated to him existed in Shaduppum, a small city located near modern Baghdad.

After the end of the Old Babylonian period the cult of Haya declined. There is no information available about any active temples or shrines dedicated to him, and he ceased to be invoked in theophoric names. However, he later started to be worshiped in Assyria. He appears in sources from the reign of the Neo-Assyrian ruler Sennacherib, who most likely saw him as a replacement for the scribal god Nabu. (Note: While Babylonia was a part of Sennacherib's empire, in contrast with Sargon II and his other predecessors he was opposed to Babylonian cultural influences and sought to limit the relevance of gods associated with Babylon, such as Nabu and Marduk, in the north.) It is possible that theologians from his court discovered Haya in god lists preserving names of deities worshiped in earlier periods. Sennacherib ordered the construction of a new temple dedicated to him. While the inscriptions mentioning this project come from Nineveh, the location of the structure itself is not known. Shana Zaia argues that it was located in Nineveh itself. In the same period Haya also came to be worshiped in Assur in a shrine located in the temple of Ashur. He also presided over a procession of the "gods of Subartu" during a festival held in this city. Furthermore, textual sources indicate he was depicted on a relief on the gates of a new akītu temple as one of the deities assisting Ashur in a battle against Tiamat. (Note: According to Gina Konstantopoulos, the relief was a part of a broader ideological programme of reconfiguring elements borrowed from the Enūma Eliš to place Ashur, rather than Marduk, in a theologically prominent position. Numerous other deities were depicted on the relief, with Sharur, Shargaz, Kakka, Nuska, Mandanu, Tishpak, "Ninurta of the Wall", Kusu, Haya, and the Sebitti placed ahead of Ashur, and Mullissu, Šerua, Sin, Ningal, Shamash, Aya, Kippat-māti, Anu, Antu, Adad, Shala, Ea, Damkina, Bēlet-ilī and Ninurta following after him.) However, after the reign of Sennacherib Haya ceased to be worshiped once more and Nabu regained the role of the main scribal deity in Assyria, as already attested in inscriptions of Esarhaddon.

== Mythology ==
Haya is sparsely attested in Mesopotamian literature. Only a single composition focused on him is known, a hymn from the reign of Rim-Sîn I of Larsa. Since it is only known from Ur, it has been proposed that it was composed to celebrate a visit of the aforementioned king in this city. It describes Haya's roles as a father-in-law of Enlil and as a divine accountant, mentions a connection between him and Ur, and implores him to bless the king. It also states that he is responsible for marking down the years of a king's reign of the "tablet of life," a mythical artifact used by gods to keep track of deeds of mortals, though in other compositions this item is instead associated with deities such as Nisaba, Ninimma, Nungal or Lammašaga.

Haya also appears in the myth Enlil and Sud, where he is mentioned as the father of the eponymous goddess. However, unlike Nisaba he does not partake in the consultations preceding Sud's marriage to Enlil.
