= Tashmetum =

Mesopotamian goddess

- Protective intercessory goddess
- Major cult center: Assur, Babylon, Borsippa, Kalhu

Genealogy
- Parents: Urash (father)
- Spouse: Nabu

Tashmetum (𒀭𒌨𒈨𒌈, ^{d}taš-me-tum, Tašmētum) was a Mesopotamian goddess. Her character is poorly understood, and she is best attested as the spouse of Nabu, though they only came to be associated with each other in the eighteenth century BCE. She was worshiped in Assyria as early as in the nineteenth century BCE, and reached Babylonia in the Old Babylonian period. Sources from the first millennium BCE indicate she was venerated alongside Nabu in cities such as Borsippa and Kalhu.

== Name ==
The theonym Tashmetum has Akkadian origin. It is derived from the root šemû, "to hear". The translations "hearing" and "reconciliation" have been suggested, though neither is certain, as the term is not attested as an abstract noun, only as a theonym and personal name. Zachary Rubin proposes translating it as "she hears" instead. Franscesco Pomponio suggested the alternate translation "intelligence", relying on the association between Tashmetum and Nabu, but no evidence for the term tašmētum ever being assigned such a meaning exists.

A secondary Sumerian name of Tashmetum, Ningutešasiga, first appears in bilingual texts from the Middle Babylonian period, where it corresponds to her Akkadian title bēlet tešmê u salīme, "lady of listening and peace". It might have originally developed as an ancient scholarly justification for folk etymologies of her name. In an inscription from Sippar she is referred to as Ninsiga (^{d}nin-sig-ga), "good lady", though elsewhere this name belongs to a deity from the entourage of Ninisina instead. A further possible alternate name or title of Tashmetum, Emagar-qabûša, "her speech showed favor", appears in a lipšur litany, though it might alternatively be interpreted as an otherwise unattested attendant deity in her service.

== Character ==
Tashmetum's character is poorly known. A prayer from the reign of Tukulti-Ninurta I (tablet KAR 128) refers to her as the "lamassu of the land", in this context a designation of a minor protective deity. She is also attested in an intercessory role, though this was a standard function of all goddesses regarded as spouses of major gods in Mesopotamian religion.

Zachary Rubin proposes that Tashmetum originated as a deified ancestor, similarly to deities such as Yakrub-El, Itūr-Mēr or Ikšudum. He points out that tàš-má-tum and tá-áš-má-tum, which might be hypocoristic forms of common names combining the word tašme (in this context: "listens to prayers") and a theonym, already appear as ordinary personal names in sources from the Old Akkadian and Ur III periods, for example in texts from the temple of Sin in Tutub. However, he stresses that there is no evidence that Tashmetum and other similar deities were imagined as a deified human within their historical cults. He concludes that even if they originated as real or imagined ancestors, they were eventually re-imagined as fully divine.

The iconography of Tashmetum is unknown.

== Associations with other deities ==
Tashmetum was regarded as the spouse of Nabu, as already attested in sources from the Old Babylonian period. Zachary Rubin argues they first came to be associated with each other in the eighteenth century BCE, possibly due to the respective meanings of their names, with Nabu's derived from nabû, "to call", and Tashmetum's from šemû, "to hear". The oldest source attesting they were associated with each other is a copy of the Weidner god list from Tell Taban dated to the late eighteenth century BCE.

As Nabu's wife, Tashmetum came to be referred to as the daughter-in-law of Marduk, once Nabu started to be viewed as Marduk's son. However, she was already associated with Marduk independently from Nabu, as evidenced for example by her incorporation into his circle in Old Babylonian Sippar. She might have been viewed either as his courtier or courtesan, prior to the development of her standard role as a spouse of Nabu. It is possible that she initially fulfilled a similar role in the court of Ashur or Ištar-Aššurītu in Assur.

No references to any deities as children of Tashmetum are known.

Urash, the tutelary god of Dilbat, could be regarded as the father of Tashmetum. Anne Löhnert argues that while the evidence is limited to sources from the first millennium BCE, they reflect an older tradition in which she was a member of the circle of this god. Zachary Rubin points out that Tashmetum does not appear in many theophoric names from Dilbat, and concludes that the connection between her and Urash might have only developed during the reign of Samsu-iluna (c. 1749–1712 BC) or later. He suggests that the association of Babylon's Urash gate with ceremonies focused on Nabu might indicate that it was perceived as Tashmetum's dowry. No sources directly refer to Urash as the father-in-law of Nabu, but this might be explained by Urash's minor position in the Mesopotamian pantheon.

By the end of the Kassite period, Tashmetum came to be associated with Nanaya through an extension of the connection between this goddess and Nabu. They appear as a triad in an inscription on a kudurru from the reign of Marduk-apla-iddina I (1171-1159 BCE), which refers to them as the "lords of judgment and decision" (EN.MEŠ šip-ṭi u EŠ.BAR). In Borsippa Tashmetum was regarded as Nabu’s official spouse, while Nanaya was apparently his mistress. As a result of this connection, both of them could be referred to as the "queen of Borsippa". However, Paul-Alain Beaulieu concludes that while a degree of syncretism did occur between them, they were not fully conflated. Joan Goodnick Westenholz argued that sharing an epithet in this case might only reflect equal status in the pantheon, as opposed to syncretism.

A late syncretic hymn to Ishtar equates her with Tashmetum (as well as Zarpanit, Ereshkigal, Ninmah, Enlil and Ninlil). However, Alison Acker Grueske and Takayoshi M. Oshima stress that she cannot be considered an Ishtar-like figure overall.

In the Hittite text KUB 60.147 Tashmetum's name is used as a logogram to designate an unidentified deity worshiped in Ištaḫara, a northern province of the Hittite Empire located in the proximity of the plain of Merzifon.

== Worship ==
According to Joan Goodnick Westenholz Tashmetum originated in Assyria in the Old Assyrian period. She was already worshiped in this area in the nineteenth century BCE, as evidenced by references to her enshrinement in the cellas of Ashur and Ištar-Aššurītu and to personal devotion to her among Assyrians. A letter found in Kanesh mentions a votive gift offered to her by the trader Pūšu-kēn, though there is no evidence she was his family's tutelary deity mentioned in other letters. In the same text corpus the theophoric names Ikun-pî-Tašmētim and Šāt-Tašmētim have been identified.

In the Old Babylonian period the worship of Tashmetum spread to the north of Babylonia, as evidenced by sources from Sippar, Borsippa and Dilbat. Zachary Rubin notes that her absence from the Old Babylonian Nippur god list might support the assumption she was still relatively poorly known in the south in this period.

Sources from the final years of the reign of Hammurabi indicate that at some point Tashmetum came to be enshrined in Babylon. In the forty first year of his reign, the king dedicated red gold and a precious stone to her, possibly in hopes of warding off potential infirmity caused by his advanced age. While no other royal inscriptions of the rulers from the First Dynasty of Babylon mention her, it is presumed she might have been enshrined in Marduk's temple Esagil in this period, and by its end she was worshiped in Sippar as a member of the circle of Marduk and Zarpanit. A letter found in this city sent by the Assyrian Tarīša to her relatives includes a blessing by Ishtar and Tashmetum, which might additionally indicate that by the Old Babylonian period she came to be seen as one of the tutelary deities of Assur.

Tashmetum came to be seen as the main goddess of Borsippa in the late second millennium BCE due to the exaltation of Nabu which occurred in the local pantheon. However, she was eventually overshadowed by Nanaya in this city.

In Assyria in the first millennium BCE Tashmetum was worshiped in Kalhu, where she was venerated in the local temple of Nabu, as well as in Nineveh and Assur. She appears in a tākultu ritual from the reign of Ashurbanipal. In other Neo-Assyrian sources, she is often grouped with Šērūa and the poorly known goddess Kippat-māti ("circumference of the earth"), presumably because all three of them were enshrined in the temple of Ashur in Assur.

=== Uncertain or disproved attestations ===
Anne Löhnert argues Tashmetum is attested for the first time in a text from the Ur III period, VAT 6563. However, the dating of this tablet, which is now lost, is uncertain, and it might be younger, specifically Old Babylonian.

Tešmit-māti, a deity attested in offering lists from the Sealand, is unlikely to be related to Tashmetum, and might be either the deified wife of the local king Gulkišar or a member of the circle of Shamash.

The theonym ^{d}U-te-eš-me-tu_{4} known from Nuzi is sometimes interpreted as a variant of Tashmetum's name. However, according to Zachary Rubin there is no evidence that this deity, who is only attested in the name of a gate of the town Zizza, is related to her, and it is possible her name should be translated as "Ishtar (^{d}U) is the one who hears", which would instead indicate a connection with Ištar-tašmê, "Ishtar of hearing", worshiped in the north of Babylonia.

While Tashmetum is not attested in Neo-Babylonian sources from Uruk, Paul-Alain Beaulieu argues she might have been introduced to the local pantheon as the spouse of Nabu. In the past, attempts have been made to prove the theophoric name Ina-ṣilli-Uridimmu attested in a text from this site should be read as Ina-ṣilli-Tašmētum based on alternate sign values, but this proposal has been abandoned by the early 2000s, and it is now assumed it reflects the worship of deified Uridimmu, a mythical lion-like hybrid creature.
