= Kippat-māti =

Mesopotamian goddess

- Intercessory goddess
- Major cult center: Assur
- Symbol: possibly a circle
- Region: Assyria

Kippat-māti or Kippatu was a Mesopotamian goddess. She is almost exclusively attested in Neo-Assyrian state rituals. It is possible that she was regarded as capable of mediating between the kings of Assyria and their dead ancestors. Textual sources indicate that she was depicted on a relief commissioned by Sennacherib which depicted a beetle between Ashur, his allies and Tiamat.

== Name and character ==
The theonym Kippat-māti was written in cuneiform as ^{d}kip-pat-KUR. A shortened form, Kippatu, ^{d}kip-pa-tu_{4}, is also attested. The full form of the name can be translated from Akkadian as "circumference of the earth", "circle of the earth" or "totality of the earth".

Salvatore Gaspa proposes that based on the meaning of Kippat-māti's name she can be connected with the pattern of concentric circles on the robes of Neo-Assyrian rulers, which following his interpretation might have been a symbol of her, as well as a representation of the king's dominion over the world. It is possible that she was also believed to function as a divine mediator capable of interceding between the kings and their dead ancestors.

== Associations with other deities ==
In Neo-Assyrian sources describing rituals held in Assur in the months Šabāṭu and Addāru, Kippat-māti commonly appears as a member of a group consisting of her, Tashmetum and Šērūa, worshiped together the temple of Ashur. (Note: For instance, a text from the reign of Ashurbanipal states that on the sixteenth of Šabāṭu, the first day of the celebrations, the three goddesses were to enter the chapel of Dagan in the same house of worship. On the nineteenth, they were to enter the temple of Anu together with the king. On the eighth of Addāru they accompanied the king during his visit to the temple of Adad.) Sometimes the deity Kutatāte appears as an additional member of the group. However, Zachary M. Rubin proposes that during the reign of Sennacherib Kippat-māti was promoted as a replacement for Tashmetum, rather than as another member of the same group of deities.

Hanspeter Schaudig suggests that Kippat-māti was regarded as the wife of Nuska in Assyria. He notes that they appear in sequence in a tākultu ritual from the reign of Aššur-etil-ilāni, and that in a Neo-Assyrian hymn both Kippat-māti and Nuska's usual spouse Sadarnunna are paired with him in parallel. Additionally, Kippat-māti is seemingly assigned Sadarnunna's position as a daughter of Anu, possibly hinting at conflation of the two goddesses in this context. The same tradition might be documented in an inscription of Adad-nirari II in which Kippat-māti is described as the spouse of a god whose name is not preserved. However, she might have been regarded as unmarried in earlier periods.

In a single ritual text from the reign of Sennacherib (tablet BM 121206), which apparently deals with the placement of statues, Kippat-māti is paired with Enlil.

== Worship ==
Most references to Kippat-māti have been identified in texts pertaining to Neo-Assyrian state rituals. According to Shana Zaia, she only starts to appear in this context during the reign of Sennacherib, and might have been a new deity invented during his theological reforms. However, Hanspeter Schaudig points out that she already appears in texts from the reign of Adad-nirari II. Jaume Llop-Raduà dates a single attestation even earlier, to the Middle Assyrian period. (Note: The theonym Kippatu, which according to Schaudig should be interpreted as a shortened form of Kippat-māti's name, also appears in a Middle Assyrian source already.)

Kippat-māti is listed in the so-called Götteradressbuch, a list of deities worshiped in Assur compiled by Kiṣir-Aššur during the reign of Ashurbanipal. She was worshiped in the temple of Ashur.

In the tākultu ritual prepared by Issar-šumu-ēreš for Ashurbanipal, Kippat-māti is listed twice, with the second entry specified as an image representing the goddess. She is also mentioned in a later tākultu from the reign of Aššur-etil-ilāni.

== Mythology ==
A text from the reign of Sennacherib indicates that Kippat-māti was depicted on the gate of the akītu temple in Assur among other deities following after Ashur as he prepares to battle Tiamat. (Note: Mullissu, Šērua, Sîn, Ningal, Shamash and Aya are listed before Kippat-māti, while Anu, Antu, Adad, Shala, Ea, Damkina, Bēlet-ilī and Ninurta after her; additionally, various warlike deities were depicted walking ahead of Ashur in the same relief. The latter group included Šarur, Šargaz, Kakka, Nuska, Mandanu, Tishpak, "Ninurta of the Wall", Kusu, Ḫaya, and the Sebitti.) The relief was a part of a broader ideological programme of reconfiguring elements borrowed from the Babylonian epic Enūma Eliš to place Ashur, rather than Marduk, in a theologically prominent position. Beate Pongratz-Leisten argues that the references to Kippat-māti and other deities from the relief accompanying the king in procession during a ritual which involved putting on the tiara of Ashur (Bēl-Agu), a symbol of control over the Assyrian empire, might indicate it was regarded as a symbolic representation of the same mythical conflict, with the king triumphing over forces of chaos much like Ashur did.
