= Haya =

Haya may refer to:

== Biology ==
- Fagus mexicana, or haya, a species of beech
- Haya (dinosaur), a genus of basal ornithopod dinosaur that lived during the Late Cretaceous from Mongolia
- Haya (plant), a genus of plants in the family Caryophyllaceae
- Haya de Herguijuela (Spanish: beech of Herguijela), a solitary specimen of European beech growing near the town of Herguijuela de la Sierra, Spain
- Myrica faya, or haya, a species of Myrica

== People ==
- Chaya (Hebrew given name), including list of persons with the name
- Haya bint Hussein (born 1974), former wife of Sheikh Mohammed bin Rashid Al Maktoum ruler of Dubai and daughter of King Hussein of Jordan
- Haya bint Saad Al Sudairi (1913–2003), wife of Ibn Saud, founder of Saudi Arabia
- Víctor Raúl Haya de la Torre (1895–1979), Peruvian politician
- William II de Haya (12th century), a Norman knight who is considered to be the progenitor of the Scottish Clan Hay

== Places ==
- Haya River (Kanagawa), a river in Kanagawa, Japan
- Hidaj, also written as Hayā, a city in Iran
- M'Haya, Meknès Prefecture, Fès-Meknès, Morocco

== Other uses ==
- Hay'a tradition, in Islamic astronomy
- HAYA (band), a Mongol music group from China
- Haya (god), in ancient Mesopotamian religion
- Haya (Islam), an Islamic term for modesty
- Haya Party (Arabic: حزب الحياة; Life Party), an Egyptian political party
- Haya people, people of the (Haya Tribe), indigenous people of Western Lake Victoria in Tanzania
  - Haya language, the language of the Haya people
- Haya Station, a railway station in Tanabe, Wakayama Prefecture, Japan
- La Haya, Spanish name for The Hague, in particular seen in references to Hague Conventions

== See also ==
- Hayya (disambiguation)
