= Bizilla =

Mesopotamian goddess

- Goddess of love, sukkal of Ninlil
- Major cult center: Ḫursaĝkalama

Bizilla (also spelled Bizila) was a Mesopotamian goddess closely associated with Nanaya and like her sometimes listed alongside courtiers of Inanna. However, she is also attested in connection with Ninlil, and it is assumed that she was viewed as the sukkal (attendant deity) of this goddess in Ḫursaĝkalama near Kish.

== Name and character ==
Bizilla's name was written in cuneiform as ^{d}NE.NUN.LAL. According to Joan Goodnick Westenholz, Bizilla's name has a plausible Sumerian etymology, "she who is pleasing." Gioele Zisa translates it as "lovingly caring", but notes based on a Mesopotamian lexical text it might have been derived from a phrase meaning "to strip".

It has been proposed that similar to Nanaya, who was closely associated with her, Bizilla was regarded as a goddess of love. An Emesal vocabulary composed between 1400 and 900 BCE lists Nanaya's Sumerian equivalent as ^{d}NIN.TAG.TAG, Ninzilzil. According to Paul-Alain Beaulieu, the name most likely should be read as Ninzizli, as one document from the Eanna archive adds a gloss to it indicating such a pronunciation: ^{d}NIN.TAG.TAG^{li}. Joan Goodnick Westenholz on the basis of the association between Nanaya and both Nanaya and Ninzizil proposed that ^{d}NIN.TAG.TAG and ^{d}NE.NUN.LAL, and possibly also a number of similarly spelled names, such as ^{d}NE.NUN, ^{d}NIN.TAG and ^{d}NUN.NUN represent two Sumerian goddesses who eventually coalesced and came to be associated with Nanaya. ^{d}TAG.NUN has also been interpreted as an alternate writing of the name of the weaver goddess Uttu, though Westenholz did not accept this interpretation.

== Associations with other deities ==
Bizilla was closely associated with Nanaya. Andrew R. George proposes that either in Uruk or in Borsippa Bizilla and Nanaya were viewed as members of one family. They could also be treated as counterparts of each other. In the Nippur god list, Bizilla appears in the Inanna section like Nanaya, though they are not placed directly next to each other. In the Weidner god list, they occur together, in a sequence of Inanna's attendants which also includes Ninshubur and Kanisurra. Accordingly, a trilingual version of the Weidner god list from Ugarit listing the Hurrian and Ugaritic equivalents of Mesopotamian deities places Ninshubur, Nanaya, Bizilla and Kanisurra in sequence. The name corresponding to Bizilla in the Hurrian column starts with the sign be, but neither the rest of it nor the Ugaritic equivalent are preserved. Bizilla and Nanaya also appear one after another in the astronomical compendium MUL.APIN. They also belong to the same group of deities in an Assyrian Tākultu text.

Bizilla most likely was regarded as the sukkal (attendant deity) of Enlil's wife Ninlil in Ḫursaĝkalama, her cult center located near Kish. In a star list, Bizilla corresponds to the "star of abundance," ^{mul}ḫé-gál-a-a, which in turn is labeled as the sukkal of Ninlil in the astronomical compendium MUL.APIN. In the same source, Bizilla is mentioned alongside Nanaya and her star Corona Borealis, in this text listed among the "palace ladies" of Enlil.

It is assumed that Bizilla in some sources occurs among deities from the court of the prison goddess Nungal, though Jeremiah Peterson considers it possible that there might have been two deities with similar names, one associated with Nungal and the other with Nanaya. He proposes the former was named ^{d}NE-zi-il-la. In the two texts in which she appears, the Hymn to Nungal and a fragment describing the journey of this goddess to the underworld in the company of Nintinugga, she is mentioned in connection with Nungal's bed, and in the former she is addressed as the "head barber" (kindagal).

== Worship ==
Administrative texts from the Ur III period indicate that Bizilla received offerings alongside Nanaya in a ceremony which involved bringing statues of various deities to the royal palace. She is also attested in an offering list from Mari from the Šakkanakku period, where she appears side by side with Nanaya. They were most likely introduced from Uruk.

An explanatory temple list known from Neo-Babylonian Sippar, arranged according to a geographic principle, states that a temple of Bizilla existed in Ḫursaĝkalama. A sanctuary of Bizilla, E-duršuanna (possibly "house, bond of lofty strength"), is also known from a single Neo-Babylonian document, though the restoration of the name is not fully certain, and no location is given. Andrew R. George tentatively proposes identifying it with the nameless temple located in Ḫursaĝkalama, as no other names of houses of worship dedicated to Bizilla are known. A festival held in Babylon in honor of Gula involved Bizila, as well as Ninlil (who alongside her presumed sukkal acted as a divine representative of Kish), Belet Eanna (Inanna of Uruk), Belet Ninua ("Lady of Nineveh") and the deity ^{d}KAŠ.TIN.NAM, possibly to be identified as a late form of the beer goddess Ninkasi.

According to the Assyrian Tākultu ritual text, Bizilla, as well as Nanaya and Kanisurra, were worshiped in Bīt-Bēlti.

An Akkadian incantation known from a copy from Ugarit invokes Bizila alongside Gula and refers to her as "lady of relief," be-let tap-ši-iḫ-ti.

^{d}TAG.NUN, according to Joan Goodnick Westenholz possibly connected with Bizilla, had a temple in Umma in the Early Dynastic period, built by king Il. Ninzizli, also linked with Bizilla and Nanaya by Westenholz, is attested in the name of a gate of the temple precinct of Eanna in a document from Neo-Babylonian Uruk.
