= Šerua =

Assyrian goddess

- Major cult center: Assur

Genealogy
- Parents: possibly Ashur (father)
- Spouse: possibly Ashur

Šerua (in late sources Serua) was a Mesopotamian goddess closely associated with the Assyrian head god Ashur. It is uncertain in which way they were related to each other.

== Character ==
Šerua is best attested in association with Ashur. She was the only deity regarded as a member of his family who was innately associated with him. While references to Zababa and Ninurta as his sons are known, they were a result of partial identification with Enlil. Mullissu (Ninlil) came to be viewed as his wife in the same process. However, it is unclear how the relation between Šerua and Ashur was initially described. Whether she was originally his wife or daughter was already a subject of scholarly inquiry in the neo-Assyrian period. In modern scholarship, it is sometimes assumed that she was originally his wife, but was later demoted to the position of his daughter or sister when Mullissu became a part of the Assyrian state pantheon as Ashur's wife. A theory based on Aramaic inscriptions from the Parthian period instead makes her initial position that of a daughter of Ashur, who later came to be viewed as his second wife. Meinhold points out that Šerua was suggested to be the daughter of Ashur in Tukulti-Ninurta's prayer to the god Ashur, but later during the Neo-Assyrian period Šerua was stated to be the wife of Ashur, and a Neo-Assyrian text emphasized that Šerua was to be called the wife of Ashur instead of the daughter of Ashur. Thus, Meinhold suggests that Šerua was originally seen as the daughter of Ashur during the Middle-Assyrian period, and then in the Neo-Assyrian period she became the second wife of Ashur while Mullissu remained the primary wife. However, the older tradition of Šerua being the daughter of Ashur continued to exist unofficially.

A number of ancient sources connect Šerua's name with the Akkadian word šērtum, "morning." For example, the text KAR 128 refers to her as ilat šērēti, "goddess of the morning hours." However, Manfred Krebernik points out this might only be a folk etymology.

According to Wilfred G. Lambert, Šerua should not be confused with Erua, a title of Marduk's wife Zarpanit, though other researchers do accept the possibility that writings of her name such as ^{d}EDIN-u-a or ^{d}EDIN, read as ^{d}E_{4}-ru_{6}, might be evidence of conflation of these two names based on their similar pronunciation.

== Worship ==
Oldest attestations of Šerua come from the late Sargonic period. She continued to be worshiped in Assur even after the fall of the Neo-Assyrian Empire, as late as in the Parthian period. A temple of Ashur and Šerua, the E-metebalāšegiagallana (Sumerian: "house, worthy of office, provided with a bride") is known from a Babylonian text. Additionally, a possible sanctuary dedicated to her, perhaps located in a temple of Ashur, is attested in an inscription of Shalmaneser I. One of the city gates of Assur was named after her. A text called the Divine Directory of Assur in modern scholarship gives its full name as "Šerua Brings Favour on her Land." However, it does not appear in enumerations of the city's gates in other sources, such as inscriptions of Erishum I and Shalmaneser III.

An Assyrian royal ritual taking place in the month Šabaṭu involved Šerua, as well as Kippat-māti and Tašmetu. It is possible their role was to mediate on behalf of the reigning kings with his deceased ancestors and with the highest gods of the pantheon, such as Anu. She is also mentioned in the Coronation Hymn of Ashurbanipal. In a Tākultu ritual text from the reign of this king she appears after various manifestations of Ashur, Enlil, Anu, Ea, Sin, Adad and Ishtar, but before Ninurta. In a similar text from the reign of Sennacherib she precedes Mullissu.

Šerua is attested in theophoric names. For example, the daughter of Ashur-uballit I bore the name Muballiṭat-Šerua.

=== Possible Babylonian attestations ===
It has also been suggested that Šerūa was introduced to Uruk during a period of Neo-Assyrian control as a reference to tenant farmers working in a field belonging to this deity is known from the Eanna archive. The name was written as ^{d}EDIN in this case. It is also possible that the epithet Aššurītu, "the Assyrian," referred to her in documents from this city. In other contexts, it referred to Mullissu.
