= Nuska =

Mesopotamian god

- Sukkal of Enlil; god of fire and light
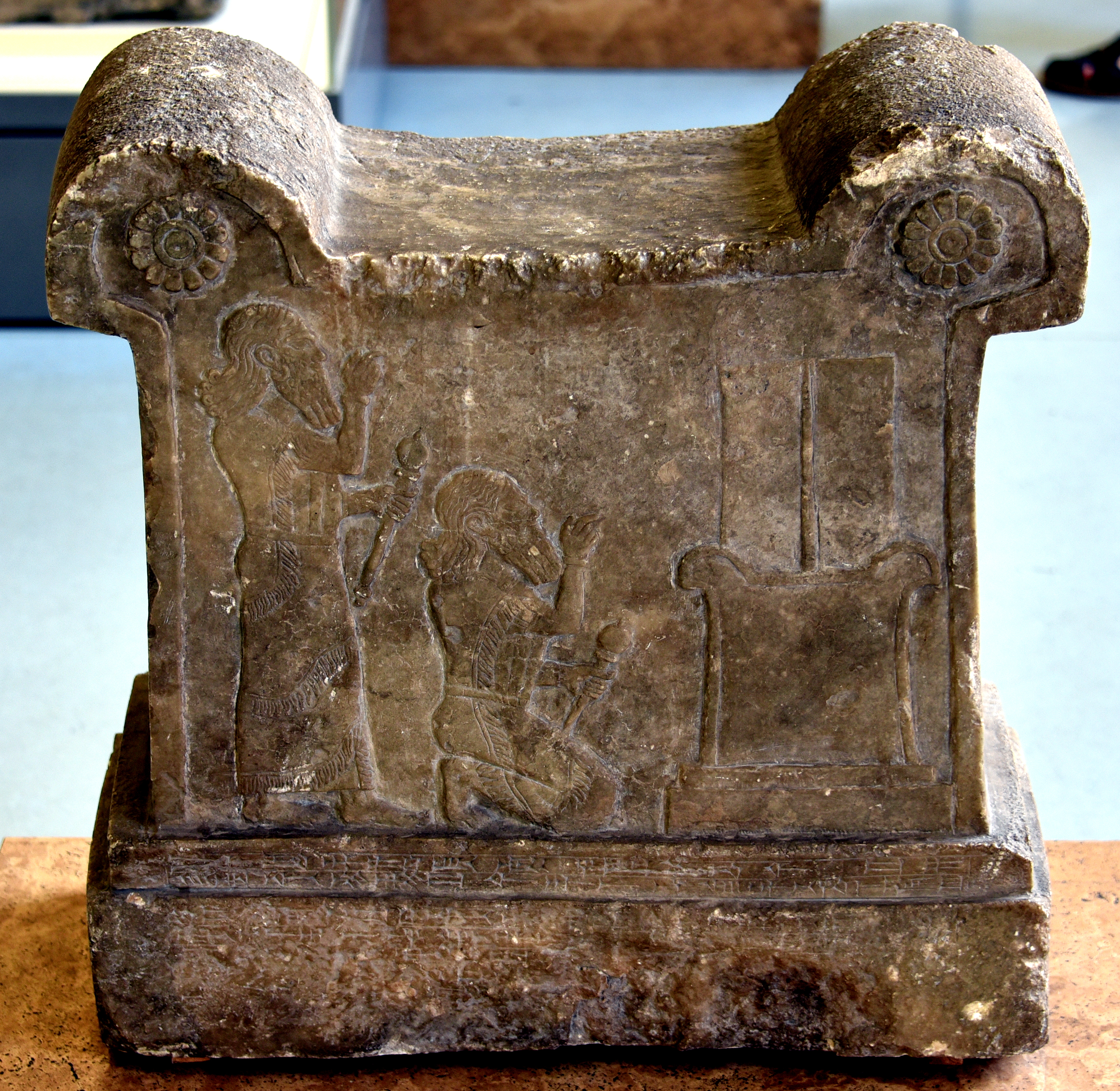
- Assyrian king Tukulti-Ninurta I praying to a symbolic representation of Nuska. The cuneiform inscription on the base reads "Cult pedestal of the god Nuska, the grand vizier, the temple Ekur...", 13th century BCE. From Assur, Iraq. Pergamon Museum.
- Major cult center: Nippur. Harran
- Animals: rooster
- Symbol: staff, flame, lamp

Genealogy
- Parents: Enlil and Ninlil; Sin and Ningal; Anu and Antu; Enul and Ninul
- Spouse: Sadarnunna
- Children: ^{d}KAL, sometimes Gibil

Nuska or Nusku, possibly also known as Našuḫ, was a Mesopotamian god best attested as the sukkal (divine vizier) of Enlil. He was also associated with fire and light, and could be invoked as a protective deity against various demons, such as Lamashtu or gallu. His symbols included a staff, a lamp and a rooster. Various traditions existed regarding his genealogy, with some of them restricted to texts from specific cities. His wife was the goddess Sadarnunna, whose character is poorly known. He could be associated with the fire god Gibil, as well as with various courtiers of Enlil, such as Shuzianna and Ninimma.

The main cult center of Nuska was Nippur, where he is already attested in the Early Dynastic period. He was worshiped both in temples of his own and in the Ekur complex. He is attested in various documents from the Kassite period, including oath formulas and inscriptions, as well as in theophoric names. In later periods, he was introduced to the local pantheons of other cities, including Babylon, Ur and Uruk in the south and Assur and Harran in the north. The last of these cities might have served as his main cult center in the late first millennium BCE. Some attestations of the worship of Nuska are available from outside Mesopotamia, including inscriptions from Chogha Zanbil in Elam and Aramaic documents from Elephantine in Egypt.

In known myths, Nuska is typically portrayed as a servant of Enlil. He appears in this role in two different narratives about his marriage, Enlil and Sud and Enlil and Ninlil, in Atrahasis, in the Anzû narrative, and in other compositions. Hymns dedicated to him are known as well.

== Name ==
The etymology of Nuska's name is uncertain. Wilfred G. Lambert proposed that it was a shortened form of Sumerian en-usuk-ak, "lord of the scepter," though he noted the form usuk is speculative, and would require an interchange of a dental and sibilant in the uncommonly attested word udug, known from lexical lists. This proposal is implausible according to Jeremiah Peterson.

The standard cuneiform writing of the name was 𒀭𒉺𒌆 (^{d}PA+TÚG), though phonetic syllabic spellings are known too. Sometimes the two attested forms, Nuska and Nusku, are treated as, respectively, the Sumerian and Akkadian readings in modern literature. According to Michael P. Streck, the reading Nuska was older, though he asserts the form Nusku, written syllabically, appears already in Old Babylonian theophoric names, such as Ibi-Nusku and Idin-Nusku. However, Lambert pointed out that this assumption is mistaken, and Streck most likely misread unrelated names invoking Numushda. Gianni Marchesi in a more recent publication states that the reading Nusku is only attested after the Old Babylonian period. The logographic writing of Nuska's name could also be read as Enšadu, commonly etymologized as "the good hearted lord," but it remains uncertain if this was simply his alternate name, or an originally independent deity, possibly viewed as a divine shepherd.

Umunmuduru was the emesal form of Nuska's name. However, according to Mark E. Cohen this theonym initially referred to the deity Ninĝidru, who only came to be identified with Nuska at a later point in time.

In Aramaic, Nuska's name was spelled as nsk in texts from Babylonia and as nšk or nwšk in these originating elsewhere, in Assyria, Nerab and Elephantine. It is also possible that the theonym Našuḫ, attested in syllabic cuneiform texts from the Neo-Assyrian and Neo-Babylonian periods in theophoric names from Harran and its surroundings, represents a second West Semitic derivative of Nuska's name.

== Character ==
Nuska was considered the divine sukkal ("vizier") or sukkalmaḫ ("great vizier") of Enlil. While the holders of the historical office of sukkalmaḫ were the overseers of the regular sukkals, there is no indication that their divine counterparts also functioned this way, and Enlil had no other servants designated with either term. Nuska fulfilled all the functions usually assigned to this type of deities, namely acting as a doorkeeper and advisor of his master, overseeing his court, and mediating between him and human supplicants. He was also believed to be the keeper of Enlil's secrets and was said to gladden his heart. In Assyria, he was incorporated into the court of Ashur in the same role. A staff was considered the badge of the office of a vizier, and is therefore attested as Nuska's attribute. He could be called en-ĝidru, the "lord of the scepter." While no text directly mentions Enlil bestowing a staff upon him, it is presumed that it was believed that like other analogous deities he received it from his superior. A text from the reign of Ishme-Dagan states that he owed his position to Enlil and Ninlil.

Extensive capabilities assigned to Nuska as a sukkal in texts dating to the Old Babylonian period or later most likely reflect the fact that he was a servant of a major deity, similar as Ninshubur, for whom an analogous phenomenon is attested. However, when the two of them appear together, Ninshubur appears to be understood as the higher ranked deity. Frans Wiggermann notes that the sukkals of the most commonly worshiped deities, such as Nuska, Ninshubur (the sukkal of Inanna) or Alammuš (the sukkal of Nanna), seemingly did not originate as an extension of their respective masters, in contrast with deities such as Ninmgir, the deified lightning who served as Ishkur's sukkal, and it is not presently possible to explain how did they acquire their respective positions as their servant.

Nuska was also associated with fire and light. He functioned as a protective deity at night, in absence of the sun god Shamash, and could be invoked against nightmares and demons. He appears in this role in Maqlû, on an amulet meant to protect the owner from the demon Lamashtu, and in a prayer invoking him against various demons, such as gallu. On occasion he was referred to as the "king of the night."

A bundle of flames occurs as the symbol of Nuska on Old Babylonian cylinder seals, but from the Kassite period onward he was most commonly associated with lamps in art. He is represented by a lamp symbol on a number of kudurru, inscribed boundary stones. A further symbol which could represent him as a god associated with providing light in the night was the rooster. A depiction of the Assyrian king Tukulti-Ninurta I praying to a staff placed on a socle is assumed to be a symbolic representation of Nuska as well. According to Frans Wiggermann, the interpretation of the object as a stylus, present in a number of older publications, is incorrect.

In a single astronomical text from Seleucid Uruk, the constellation Orion is linked to Nuska, though it was more commonly associated with Papsukkal.

== Associations with other deities ==
Nuska was considered to be a son of Enlil, and by extension a brother of Ninurta. However, according to Ruth Horry, he was referenced as Enli' s courtier more commonly than as his descendant. In the hymn Nuska B, Nuska's parents are instead Enul and Ninul, a pair of deities typically found in lists of ancestors of Enlil. According to Jeremiah Peterson, another pair of similar deities, Enki and Ninki, could occur in this role too. The ancestral Enki paired with Ninki is not to be confused with the homophonous god of wisdom, Enki.

In the first millennium BCE in Harran, Nuska came to be viewed as a son of the moon god Sin and his wife Ningal. Manfred Krebernik suggests that this tradition might have developed through Aramaic influence. Michael P. Streck instead argues that the new connection depended on the fact that Nuska and Sin were both believed to provide light during the night. Another alternate tradition, according to which Nuska was a son of Anu, developed due to the association between him and Gibil. Julia Krul suggests that the priests of Anu might have adhered to it in Uruk in the Seleucid period. However, she also notes Nuska retained the role of Enlil's servant in this context.

The goddess Sadarnunna was regarded as Nuska's wife. Her relation to him is her best attested feature, and her character is otherwise poorly known. Hanspeter Schaudig proposes that in Assyria Kippat-māti might have fulfilled this role. He notes that she and Nuska appear together in a tākultu ritual from the reign of Aššur-etil-ilāni and that a Neo-Assyrian hymn pairs Nuska both with her and Sadarnunna in different verses. He speculates that the same tradition might additionally be documented in an inscription of Adad-nirari II in which Kippat-māti is described as the spouse of a god whose name is not preserved.

Gibil could sometimes be viewed as Nuska's son. According to Andrew R. George, the fire god was already associated with him and could be portrayed acting on his behalf during the reign of Nazi-Maruttash, when they appear together in a kudurru inscription. The earlier Weidner god list places Gibil in the proximity of Nuska, behind Sadarnunna. According to the god list An = Anum Nuska also had a daughter whose name was written logographically as ^{d}KAL. According to Richard L. Litke, she should be distinguished from other deities whose names could be represented by this sign. She was married to Inimmanizi, the sukkal of Ninurta.

As a servant of Enlil, Nuska could be associated with other members of his court, and in a number of texts he is grouped with Shuzianna, Ninimma, Ennugi, Kusu, Ninšar and Ninkasi. Kalkal, the divine doorkeeper of the temple Ekur, was considered his subordinate. A late esoteric explanatory text equates Nuska with Lumma. The equation between them most likely depended on their shared epithet udug Ekurrake, "guardian of Ekur." However, in offering lists, as well as in An = Anum, they occur separately from each other. The same explanatory text also equates Sadarnunna with Ḫadaniš, another divine guardian of Ekur, according to Gianni Marchesi identical with a king of Hamazi from the Sumerian King List. The Kassite god Shuqamuna also could be considered analogous to Nuska.

In Seleucid Uruk Nuska, Isimud and Papsukkal functioned as a group. In the texts specifically pertaining to the Akitu festival, the first two of them are grouped with Kusu instead. Pisangunug appears in ritual texts alongside members of these groups too.

== Worship ==
The earliest evidence of the worship of Nuska is a theophoric name attested in a text from Shuruppak. However, he is absent from the Fara and Abu Salabikh god lists. He was worshiped in Nippur since the Early Dynastic period and in the third millennium BCE was already considered one of the main deities in the local pantheon, next to Enlil, Ninlil, Ninurta and Inanna. His temples in this city bore the ceremonial Sumerian names Emelamanna, "house of the radiance of heaven," and Emelamḫuš, "house of awesome radiance." A text from the Old Babylonian period states that in addition to Nuska himself, Enlil, Shuzianna and the pair Lugalirra and Meslamtaea were worshiped in an unspecified temple dedicated to him located in Nippur. The last two of these deities functioned as its divine doorkeepers. Attested temple staff dedicated to him included six NIN.DINGIR priestesses, five pašišu priests, singers, doorkeepers and a snake charmer. Nuska was also worshiped alongside Sadarnunna in the Ekur complex in the Ešmaḫ, "exalted house." Furthermore, a topographical text lists him as one of the nine deities worshiped in the temple of Ninimma.

The worship of Nuska continued in Nippur in the Kassite period. He is attested in multiple dedicatory inscriptions and in oath formulas. Furthermore, he appears commonly in theophoric names, in which he is attested locally with comparable frequency as Ninurta, Ishtar or Nergal. A total of fifty names invoking him were known as of 2017. He is overall the seventh most commonly occurring deity in them. The names are more sparsely attested in the first millennium BCE, and while Nuska continued to be worshiped in Nippur, references to him have only been identified in some of the texts from the city, and he is absent altogether for example from the šandabakku archive from the eighth century BCE.

=== Other southern cities ===
Starting with the Neo-Babylonian period, Nuska is also attested in documents from Uruk. His temple (É ^{d}NUSKU) was most likely a small independent sanctuary. Its staff included a šangû, translated as "pontiff" by Paul-Alain Beaulieu. Nuska is also attested in a single document from this city the Achaemenid period. Later, under the rule of the Seleucids, he was worshiped in the Bīt Rēš, "head temple," a complex of sacral buildings established in this period which was dedicated to Anu and Antu. He was believed to guard one of its gates, the Great Gate (ká.gal). While he appears in a variety of ritual texts, he is absent from theophoric names.

Nuska also was incorporated into the pantheons of other cities in the first millennium BCE, including Ur, where he was venerated in the Egipar, the temple of Ningal, as attested in a brick inscription of Sin-balassu-iqbi. His cultic seat located there bore the name Eadgigi, "house of the counselor." He is also attested in texts from Babylon, where he was worshiped in the Esagil complex, where his seat was the Eigrku, perhaps to be translated as "house of the pure oven," though the restoration of the second sign in the name is uncertain. He also had his own temple in this city, the Enunmaḫ, "house of the exalted prince," attested in a topographical text.

=== Northern Mesopotamia ===
While Nuska is not attested in sources from Assyria from the Old Assyrian period, he was worshiped there in the Middle Assyrian period already. For example, an Assyrian king who reigned in the twelfth century BCE bore the name Mutakkil-Nusku. Nuska is also mentioned in a hymn dedicated to wartime exploits of Tiglath-Pileser I, in which he is one of the gods who help the king vanquish his enemies during military campaigns. In a building inscription Ashurbanipal lists him as one of the deities who granted him the right to rule as his father's successor. He also appears in the Tākultu text from his reign, between Tashmetum and Ninurta. In Assur he was worshiped in a cella located in the Ešarra, the temple of Ashur.

The city of Harran functioned as a cult center of Nuska in the north. Julia Krul argues that it should be considered the main city in which he was worshiped in the first millennium BCE. He was venerated in the Emelamanna, "house of the radiance of heaven," which might have been either an independent temple or a cella in the Eḫulḫul, "house which gives joy," the temple of Sin. It was rebuilt by Ashurbanipal. It is sometimes assumed that a deity still worshiped in Harran in the times of Jacob of Serugh (451-521 CE), Bar NMR’, was a remnant of the original cult of Nuska.

=== Outside Mesopotamia ===
The Elamite ruler Untash-Napirisha built a sanctuary of Nuska in the Chogha Zanbil complex. A total of forty five bricks with various inscriptions commemorating this event in which the king asks Napirisha, Inshushinak and Nuska to accept this construction project as an offering have been found during excavations.

Arameans worshiped Nuska in Nerab near Aleppo, which was a cult center of their moon god Šahr, and in Elephantine in Egypt.

== Mythology ==
In myths, Nuska is usually portrayed as a servant of Enlil.

Nuska appears the myth Enlil and Sud, in which he is directly designated as a sukkal. Enlil, in this composition portrayed as a bachelor, sends him to consult a marriage proposal with Nisaba, the mother of Sud, a goddess who he earlier accidentally insulted, either by mistake or in a failed attempt to flirt with her. He also instructs him to bring a gift for Sud. He is told to carry it in his left hand, which according to Wilfred G. Lambert might indicate that he carried a staff in his right hand as a badge of his office. Miguel Civil argued that due to apparent Mesopotamian perception of right hand as ritually pure and thus more suitable for various activities, such as prayer, eating and baking, this might indicate that Enlil viewed Sud as impure, but Lambert disagrees with this interpretation, and suggests that the gift was simply meant to be kept hidden due to being an additional way to seal the negotiations. The exact nature of the gift is not known, and it simply described as a "treasure" (gi_{16}-sa). Nisaba is pleased with Nuska's polite conduct, and agrees to Enlil's proposal. After returning, he reports his success to his master, who happily starts to prepare the wedding gifts. Afterwards Enlil marries Sud, who receives the name Ninlil as a result. In a myth presenting a different version of the relationship between Enlil and his spouse, Enlil and Ninlil, Nuska also appears as his servant. In this text, Enlil orders him to transport him across the river so that he can meet Ninlil.

Nuska also appears in Atrahasis. When the divine doorkeeper Kalkal notices the rebelling gods have surrounded the Ekur, he wakes up Nuska, who in turn wakes up Enlil to inform him about the situation. He subsequently carries messages between Enlil and the rebellious worker gods. Later he is tasked with summoning Shullat and Hanish, who start the flood at Enlil's command.

In Ninurta's Return to Nippur, Nuska appears briefly to greet and praise the eponymous god when he approaches Ekur after vanquishing various enemies. In the late version of the Anzû myth, Enlil tells Nuska to summon Birdu, who subsequently is sent to inquire Ninurta about his decision to keep the Tablets of Destiny.

A number of hymns dedicated to Nuska are known, including the compositions designated as Nuska A, Nuska B and Ishme-Dagan Q in the Electronic Text Corpus of Sumerian Literature.
