= Hayya =

Hayya may refer to:

- Hayya, Sudan
- Jack C. Hayya, American engineer and academic
- Khalil al-Hayya (born 1960), Palestinian politician

== See also ==
- Haya (disambiguation)
