= Sutītu =

Mesopotamian goddess

- Divine representation of Suteans
- Major cult center: Borsippa

Sutītu was a Mesopotamian goddess regarded as a divine representation of the nomadic Suteans. She arose in the early first millennium BCE as one of the multiple deities meant to embody specific ethnolinguistic groups. She is best attested in texts from Borsippa, where she first appears in sources from the eighth century BCE, though a chapel dedicated to her apparently also existed in the Esagil temple complex in Babylon.

== Name and character ==
Information about Sutītu's character and her position in the Mesopotamian pantheon is scarce. Her name can be translated as "the Sutean goddess". The term "Sutean" (sutû) was used in Babylonia to refer to nomadic speakers of West Semitic languages, and in some contexts functioned interchangeably with the label "Aramean" (aḫlamû). Sutītu has therefore herself been described as an "Aramean goddess" by Rocío Da Riva and Gianluca Galetti.

In the god list An = Anum (tablet IV, line 135) the term Sutītu appears as one of the epithets of Inanna: ^{d}INANNA su-ti-it = Su-ti-tu. However, according to Joan Goodnick Westenholz Sutītu understood as a distinct goddess only arose in the first millennium BCE as one of the new deities meant to personify specific ethnolinguistic groups. Other examples include Kaššû ("the Kassite god"), Kaššītu ("the Kassite goddess") and Aḫlamītu ("the Aramean goddess"). Comparisons have also been made between them and the earlier god Amurru. A non-Mesopotamian example of an analogous phenomenon was the creation of the goddess Roma, who is first attested during the reign of emperor Augustus.

== Associations with other deities ==
In Borsippa, Sutītu was associated with Nanaya, specifically with Nanaya of Euršaba, who is considered distinct from the other form of this goddess worshiped in said city due to lack of a link between her and Nabu. In a single case, Sutītu might be attested as an epithet of Nanaya as well. An undated administrative document, BM 25849, pairs Sutītu with Mār-bīti, a god who was also locally associated with Nanaya. According to Joan Goodnick Westenholz, a group consisting of these three deities functioned as a "special sub-unit in the local pantheon of Borsippa". A possible depiction of Sutītu (clad in robes decorated with crosses), Nanaya and Mār-bīti has been identified on a stela from Borsippa, VaS 1 36, dated to the reign of Nabu-shuma-ishkun.

A late double column version of the Weidner god list, KAV 63, explains the names of two deities, Araḫtu and Ṣilluš-ṭāb, as ^{d}Su-ti-tum (Sutītu). The former name referred to the river Euphrates, which was worshiped as a deity. The latter is a goddess attested elsewhere alongside Katunna as one of the two "daughters of Esagil", the divine hairdressers of Zarpanit.

== Worship ==
Most of attestations of Sutītu are known from Borsippa, where she was already worshiped in the middle of the eighth century BCE. It is presumed that her local cult had an official (rather than private) character. Texts from the reign of Nabu-shuma-ishkun mention various members of clergy of this goddess, namely ērib-bīti, a class of priests, and a šangû, a temple administrator. Based on the available evidence, it is presumed that Sutītu attained a degree of popularity in the Neo-Babylonian period. Theophoric names invoking her, such as Ardi-Sutîti and Amti-Sutîti, have been identified in documents from the archives of the Ili-bani family. The former of the two examples listed is masculine and the latter feminine. Spelling the theonym with i as the final vowel reflects its genitive form. A single letter, OECT 12, contains a blessing formula invoking Sutītu alongside Nanaya. Various offerings to her are also mentioned in a number of texts from Borsippa, including beer, barley and meat of oxen.

In the Neo-Babylonian period Sutītu apparently also had a chapel in the Esagil temple complex in Babylon, though since only a single text referring to it is known it is possible that it was not regarded as a permanent dwelling of the goddess, but merely as the location in which she was worshiped during festivals which involved her arrival in this city. A ritual text presumed to be related to celebrations of the new year feast in the month Ninsan, BM 40790, mentions the preparation of mirrors of Sutītu, Nanaya and Gula of Eulla in Esagil, presumably meant for a ceremony involving clothing of these three deities. The functionaries responsible for it were ḫullālānītu, a class of priestesses. The origin of this term is not certain, but in known texts bearers of this title were involved in the cults of a number of female deities and appear in association with singers. Connections with various terms have proposed, including Akkadian ḫullānu, "shirt" or "coverlet", ḫulālu, a type of precious stone and ḫalālu, "to confine, shut away", or less plausibly Aramaic ḥll and ḥwl, "to dance around".

A further attestation of Sutītu has been identified on at least one votive eye-stone of Ashurbanipal found in the treasury of Persepolis, with a second similar artifact being inscribed with a damaged theonym, ^{d}Su-, possibly also to be identified as a mention of this goddess.
