= Nunbarsegunu =

Mesopotamian mother goddess of barley

Nunbarsegunu is an obscure mother goddess and goddess of barley in Mesopotamian (Sumerian, Babylonian, and Akkadian) mythology. Mentioned in creation texts as the 'old woman of Nippur', she is identified as the mother of Ninlil, the air goddess. Ninbarsegunu instructs her daughter in the arts of obtaining the attentions of Enlil. It has been suggested that Nunbarsegunu is another name for Nisaba, goddess of writing.
