= Nisaba =

Mesopotamian goddess of writing

- Goddess of writing, accounting, surveying and grain
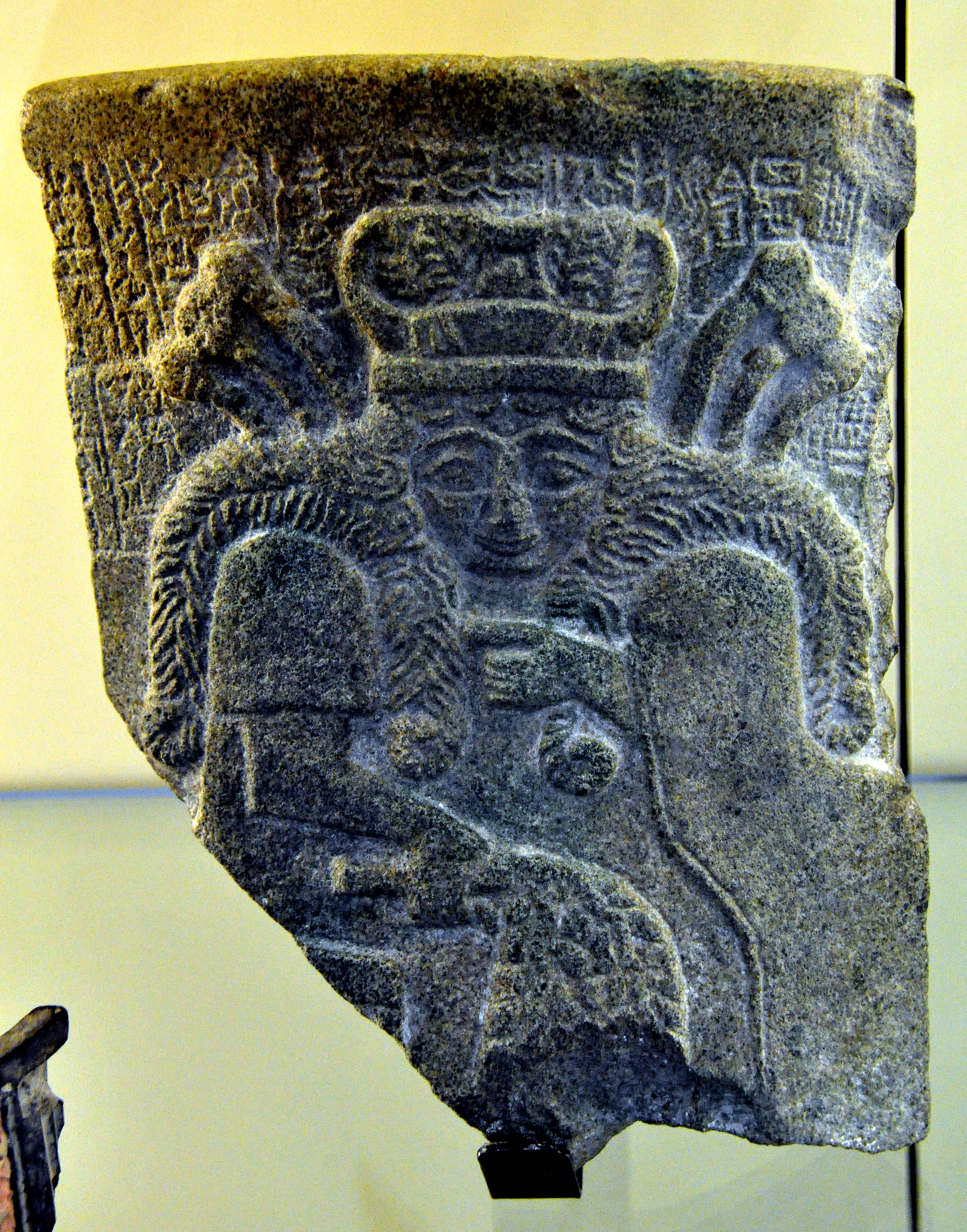
- Fragment of a vase, likely from Girsu, with a depiction of a goddess often identified as Nisaba in modern scholarship
- Other names: Nanibgal, Nunbarshegunu
- Affiliation: The court of Enlil
- Major cult center: Eresh, later Nippur
- Symbol: lapis lazuli tablet, golden stylus

Genealogy
- Parents: Urash and Anu; Urash and Ea (identified with Irḫan); Enlil (and an unknown mother)
- Consort: Ḫaya
- Children: Sud (Ninlil)

Equivalents
- Babylonian: Nabu

Nisaba was the Mesopotamian goddess of writing and grain. She is one of the oldest Sumerian deities attested in writing, and remained prominent through many periods of Mesopotamian history. She was commonly worshiped by scribes, and numerous Sumerian texts end with the doxology "praise to Nisaba" as a result. She declined after the Old Babylonian period due to the rise of the new scribe god, Nabu, though she did not fully vanish from Mesopotamian religion and attestations from as late as the neo-Babylonian period are known.

In myths and god lists, she was a part of the circle of Enlil, alongside her husband Haya. In the myth Enlil and Sud she plays an important role due to being the mother of the eponymous deity. Enlil seeks her permission to marry Sud with the help of his sukkal (attedant deity) Nuska. Both this narrative and other sources attest that she and her daughter were regarded as very close.

Outside Mesopotamia her name was used to logographically represent these of other gods, not necessarily similar to her in character, including Syrian Dagan, Hurrian Kumarbi and Hittite Ḫalki.

== Name ==
The origin of Nisaba's name is unknown. The widely accepted reading, Nisaba, has been confirmed by Akkadian lexical texts spelling the name syllabically as ni-sa-ba. The reading Nidaba, originally favored by some Assyriologists, for example Miguel Civil, is now regarded as implausible, as the evidence is very scant, and might simply constitute recurring scribal errors. The name Nisaba was originally written using a combination of the cuneiform sign 𒉀, called NAGA, accompanied by the dingir, 𒀭, so-called "divine determinative" preceding names of deities. The NAGA sign is assumed to be a pictogram representing a plant, possibly later interpreted as a sheaf of barley. The same sign, though with a different determinative added, was also used to write the name of Nisaba's main cult center, Eresh. While the true etymology of Nisaba's name is generally considered impossible to determine, Wilfred G. Lambert proposed that it was derived from a hypothetical form nin.sab(a).ak, "Lady of Saba," but as no such a place name is attested in Sumerian sources this is regarded as implausible. Another proposal explains it as nin-še-ba-ak, "lady of grain rations."

It has been proposed that a variant form of the name, Nišpa, was used in Mari, perhaps as a syllabic rather than logographic spelling. However, it has also been argued that this deity, attested only in a single Amorite personal name, Ḫabdu-Nišpa, instead corresponds to Nišba rather than Nisaba. Nišba was most likely a deified mountain, and appears in inscriptions of Iddin-Sin of Simurrum and Anubanini of Lullubum. It has also been argued that the mountain was regarded as holy by the Gutians. Furthermore, a certain KA-Nišba was the ruler of Simurrum during the reign of the Gutian king Erridupizir. The mountain corresponding to Nišba is assumed to lie northeast of modern Sulaymaniyah, though there is no agreement which landmark bore this name.

An alternate name of Nisaba was Nanibgal (Sumerian: 𒀭𒉀 ^{D}AN.NAGA; later 𒀭𒊺𒉀 ^{D}AN.ŠE.NAGA), though this name also functioned as a name of a distinct goddess. Yet another name applied to her was Nunbarshegunu.

=== Epithets ===
Nisaba's epithets include "lady of wisdom," "professor of great wisdom" (geštu_{2} diri tuku-e) "unsurpassed overseer" (ugulu-nu-diri; ugula is an office known for example from Eshnunna, conventionally translated as "overseer"), and "opener of the mouth of the great gods." Names of a number of distinct goddesses could also serve as epithets of Nisaba, including Aruru, Ezina-Kusu and Kusu (in this context meaning "goddess filled with purity"), without necessarily implying identification of the deities with each other.

== Functions ==
Piotr Michalowski describes Nisaba as "the goddess of grain and the scribal arts in the widest sense of this word, including writing, accounting and surveying." She was also associated with literature and songs. It is commonly assumed that she was an agricultural deity in origin, but started to be associated with writing after its invention. However, it is agreed that in Sumerian texts the latter association is regarded as primary. In the texts forming the curriculum of scribal schools she is the deity most commonly associated with literacy, numeracy and related implements.

Due to her primary function Wilfred G. Lambert regarded her gender as unusual, noting that "female scribes were very rare" in historical records. However, as proven by Eleanor Robson, it was not uncommon for goddesses to be regarded as literate in Sumerian mythology, and individual goddesses are regarded as such twice as often as individual gods in texts from the Electronic Text Corpus of Sumerian Literature. Various compositions include references to many other goddesses writing, using measuring tools or performing other tasks associated with literacy and numeracy, including Inanna, Manungal, Geshtinanna, Ninisina, Ninshubur (counted by Robson as male, but usually regarded as primarily female) and even a minor lamma goddess serving Bau.

As a goddess of wisdom Nisaba was believed to bestow it upon rulers, as attested in compositions associated with Lipit-Ishtar and Enlil-bani. Scribes' right to teach others their craft was likewise believed to be bestowed upon them by her.

The Curse of Agade lists her among the most prominent deities, alongside Sin, Enki, Inanna, Ninurta, Ishkur and Nuska. This grouping is regarded as unusual by researchers.

In late texts Nisaba commonly appears simply as the deification of grain, though there are exceptions. A prayer known from a compilation of texts about goddesses from neo-Assyrian Kalhu still refers to her as the "queen of wisdom." It also appears that in the first millennium BCE she acquired an association with exorcisms.

== Iconography ==
It has been proposed that some depictions of so-called "vegetation deities" known from the art of the Early Dynastic and Akkadian periods are representations of Nisaba. For example, it is commonly assumed that the goddess with stalks of vegetation decorating her crown, depicted on a fragment of a stone vase, likely from Girsu (presently in the Pergamon Museum), is Nisaba. Kathleen R. Maxwell-Hyslop points out that she is however not mentioned in the accompanying inscription, and other identifications are possible, including Bau.

== Association with other deities ==
As a grain deity, Nisaba was sometimes regarded as synonymous with the goddess Ashnan, though most primary sources, including god lists and offering lists, present them as fully separate. It has also been proposed that she was the same goddess as Ezina and Kusu, but all three of them appear separately in offering lists from Lagash. Syncretic associations possibly present in ancient scholarship did not necessarily translate into cultic practice.

The goddess Ninimma, regarded as the personal scribe of Enlil, was sometimes associated with and possibly acquired some of the characteristics of Nisaba due to fulfilling a similar role in the pantheon of Nippur. In god lists she often follows the latter and her spouse.

=== Family and court ===
Nisaba's husband was Haia, possibly regarded as a god of seals. He was a deity of relatively low rank. Compared to other divine couples (Shamash and Aya, Ishkur and Shala, Ninsianna and Kabta, Enki and Damkina, Lugalbanda and Ninsun and others) they are invoked together extremely rarely in seal inscriptions, with only one example presently known. In one explanatory text, Haya is described as "Nisaba of prosperity" (Nisaba ša mašrê).

Their daughter was Sud, the city goddess of Shuruppak, in later periods fully conflated with Enlil's wife Ninlil.

According to the god list An = Anum, Nisaba had two sukkals (attendant deities), Ungasaga and Hamun-ana.

In god lists, she usually appears in the section dedicated to relatives and servants of Enlil.

Multiple traditions regarding Nisaba’s origin are known, and her parentage is not regarded as fixed in ancient tradition. She was described either as the firstborn daughter of Enlil, as his mother in law, or possibly as his twin sister. Her mother is usually said to be Urash. In a first millennium BCE text from Kalhu, which is also the source attesting that she could be viewed as Enlil's twin, her father is Ea, equated with Irḫan, in this context understood as a cosmic river, "father of the gods of the universe." Elsewhere Irḫan was often associated with Ishtaran. Wilfred G. Lambert notes that the text "seems to imply a desire not to have Anu as Nisaba's father," though attestations of the sky god in this role are nonetheless known from other sources.

=== Nisaba and Nabu ===
Nabu gradually replaced Nisaba as a deity of writing in what has been described by Julia M. Asher-Greve as "the most prominent case of a power transferred to a god from a goddess" in Mesopotamian history. However, the process was complex and gradual. In the Old Babylonian and early Kassite periods Nabu’s cult was only popular in central Mesopotamia (Babylon, Sippar, Kish, Dilbat, Lagaba), had a limited extent in peripheral areas (Susa in Elam, Mari in Syria) and there is little to no evidence of it from cities such as Ur and Nippur. Nabu has relatively few epithets in god lists from the second millennium BCE as well.

In late bronze age Ugarit Nisaba and Nabu coexisted, and colophons of texts reveal that a number of scribes described themselves as "servant of Nabu and Nisaba." Similar evidence is also known from Emar.

Andrew R. George assumes the reason why Nabu replaced Nisaba, while other deities associated with writing did not, was due to the generalized character of his connection to this art. He points out that while Ninimma and Ninurta were also associated with writing, the former occupied a different niche from Nisaba (which he compares to them functioning as a librarian and as a scribe or scholar, respectively), while the latter was only a divine scribe as an extension of his role as the archetypal good son helping his elderly father with his various duties (in this case - writing down Enlil's judgments on the Tablet of Destinies).

=== ^{d}NISABA as logographic writing of other deities' names ===
In some documents from Syrian cities, for example Halab, the logogram ^{d}NISABA designates the god Dagan, while in Hurrian texts - Kumarbi. According to Alfonso Archi, both of these phenomena have the same source. In cities such as Ugarit, Dagan's name was homophonous with the word for grain (dgn in alphabetic Ugaritic texts), and the logographic writing of his and Kumarbi's names as ^{d}NISABA was likely a form of wordplay popular among scribes, relying on the fact that Nisaba's name could simply be understood as “grain” too. In theological texts, both Kumarbi and Dagan were compared to each other and Enlil rather than Nisaba due to all three of them playing the role of “father of gods” in their respective pantheons.

The name of the Hittite grain goddess Ḫalki could be represented by the logogram ^{d}NISABA too.

== Worship ==
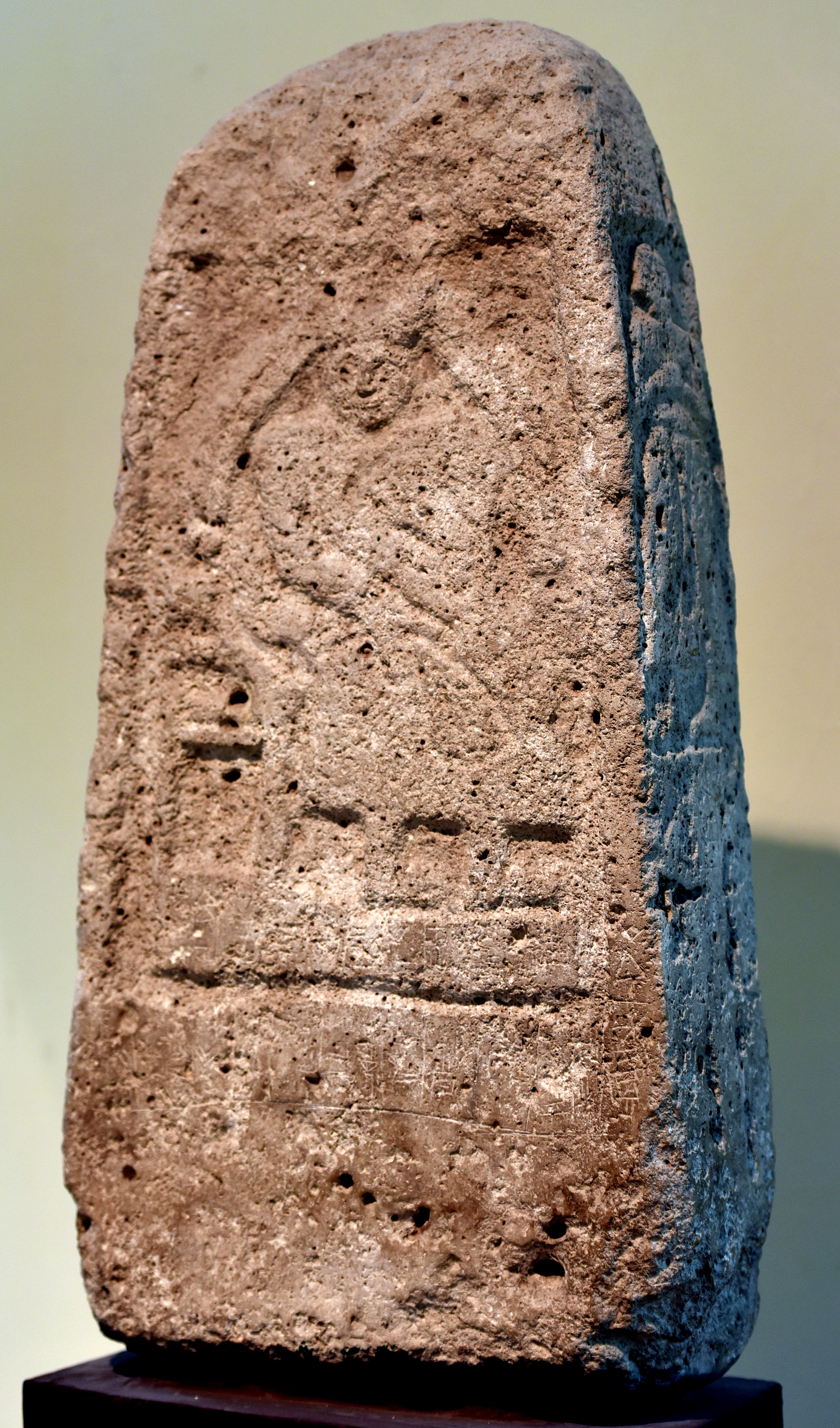
Stele Ur-Nanshe from Lagash. The goddess Nisaba appears on the frontal aspect. 26th century BCE. Iraq Museum, Baghdad

Nisaba is one of the tutelary goddesses of specific cities already attested in the most ancient written sources, a status shared with Ezina, Nanshe, Inanna of Uruk and Inanna of Zabalam. Eresh was her original cult center, and there is evidence it was a city of considerable importance in the Early Dynastic times, including a reference to a possible king (lugal). Its existence is attested from between Uruk IV and Old Babylonian periods, though only a single reference, a year name of Sin-Muballit of Babylon, postdates the Ur III period. It is therefore assumed that it gradually declined, and that as a result its deities were transferred to Nippur.

It is assumed that Nisaba acquired broader significance outside her city in the Early Dynastic period already. She was worshiped in Shuruppak, Urukagina of Lagash left behind inscriptions in which he refers to her, while Lugalzagesi of Umma considered her his personal tutelary deity, and described himself as her high priest (lu-maḫ). She is also one of the goddesses mentioned in inscriptions of Naram-Sin of Akkad.

Temples of Nisaba attested in textual sources include E-mulmul ("house of stars") in Eresh and Edubbagula ("large store house") in the Girsu-Lagash area. In Nippur she was worshiped in the temple of her daughter Ninlil alongside Nintinugga, Ninhursag and Nanna. A festival of Nisaba is also attested from Umma. The term "house of wisdom of Nisaba" is known from many texts, and Andrew R. George assumes that at least two shrines of Nisaba, one in Eridu and another in Uruk bore such a name. However, it is also possible this term functioned as a generic designation of scribal institutions.

In letters from the Old Babylonian period, Nisaba appears less often than the most popular goddesses (Ishtar, Ninsianna, Aya, Annunitum, Sarpanit, Gula) but more commonly than Ninlil or Nanshe. Old Assyrian evidence includes three references to Nisaba as a family deity. A reference to a prayer "before Ashur and Nisaba" is known from the same period and might be another attestation of her as a tutelary deity of a specific individual or family, like other similar prayers to Ashur and a second deity. Later she continued to be worshiped in the territories of the First Sealand dynasty.

In later periods Nisaba did not entirely cease to be an object of worship, though she largely existed "in the shadow of Nabu." She nonetheless acquired a new role one of the goddesses most commonly invoked in exorcisms, next to Kusu and Ningirima. Additionally, as late as during the reign of Marduk-apla-iddina I references were made to "wisdom of Nabu and Nisaba."

While references to Nisaba are known from texts from Ebla, Emar, Ugarit and Mari, it is uncertain whether she had an active, official cult anywhere outside Babylonia with the exception of the last of the aforementioned cities, where she is present on offering lists most likely dated to the reign of Yahdun-Lim or earlier.

As the choice of a personal god was often based on profession, Nisaba was a popular object of devotion among scribes. As an extension of this phenomenon, many Sumerian texts end with the formula "praise Nisaba," and some invoke her in the beginning too. Most cylinder seals of scribes from Lagash show a female deity, though it is uncertain if she can be always identified as Nisaba. Other deities commonly attested in personal names of members of this profession include Ninimma (in the Ur III and Old Babylonian periods) and Nabu (in the first millennium BCE).

== Mythology ==
In mythological texts Nisaba is portrayed as the scribe and accountant of the gods. Many compositions mention her literacy, with over a half of the references to literacy and numeracy of goddesses in the texts included in the Electronic Text Corpus of Sumerian Literature referring to her according to a survey conducted by Eleanor Robson. In the myth Enki and the World Order, she is entrusted by Enki with measuring the land and with overseeing the harvest. In the Kesh Temple Hymn, she is tasked with writing down Enlil's words of praise for the city of Kesh. In this text the process of writing down words on a tablet is described in poetic terms as comparable to making a necklace out of individual beads.

According to various texts Nisaba was believed to be equipped with a lapis lazuli tablet inscribed with "heavenly writing," a term related to poetic comparisons between cuneiform signs and stars. It has also been suggested that it might be connected to the well attested practice of consulting the constellations to determine the best time for cultivation of specific crops.

Nisaba is also mentioned in the myth Enmerkar and Ensuhgirana, in which Sagburu, a native of Eresh described as "wise woman" mockingly notes that the antagonist, Urgirinuna from Hamazi, was foolish to think he could engage in sorcery in Nisaba's city. The passage hints at a close bond between Nisaba and her daughter, as Eresh is called "the beloved city of Ninlil." While references to goddesses breastfeeding are very rare in Mesopotamian literature, one of the few known exceptions refers to Nisaba and Sud.

Nisaba plays a central role in the myth Enlil and Sud. Much like in other sources, she is represented as a goddess of wisdom and mother of Sud. Enlil, represented unusually as a young bachelor, seeks to gain her permission to marry her daughter. Enlil's sukkal Nuska negotiates with her on his behalf. Nisaba, pleased with the latter's conduct and the gifts he brought for her and Sud, agrees to the proposal, and bestows various blessings on her daughter.

A late Akkadian composition known from Assur and Sultantepe describes a debate between Nisaba and personified wheat. In this text she is called the "Mistress of the underworld," an otherwise unknown association.

== Unicode for the cuneiform sign NAGA ==
Unicode 5.0 encodes the NAGA sign at U+12240 𒉀 (Borger 2003 nr. 293). AN.NAGA is read as NANIBGAL, and AN.ŠE.NAGA as NÁNIBGAL. NAGA is read as NÍDABA or NÍSABA, and ŠE.NAGA as NIDABA or NISABA.

The inverted (turned upside down) variant is at U+12241 𒉁 (TEME), and the combination of these, that is the calligraphic arrangement NAGA-(inverted NAGA), read as DALḪAMUN_{7} "whirlwind", at U+12243 𒉃. DALḪAMUN_{5} is the arrangement AN.NAGA-(inverted AN.NAGA), and DALḪAMUN_{4} is the arrangement of four instances of AN.NAGA in the shape of a cross.
