= Ninĝidru =

Mesopotamian goddess representing the sceptre

- Divine representation of the scepter
- Major cult center: Shuruppak

Ninĝidru (^{d}Nin-PA; alternatively read Ninĝešduru) was a Mesopotamian goddess who most likely represented a deified scepter. She played a role in coronation rituals. She often appears in association with Ninmena, who represented the deified crown. A recently published hymn additionally attests that she was the sukkal (attendant deity) of Sud, the tutelary goddess of Shuruppak.

== Name and character ==
The theonym referring to a deified scepter was written as ^{d}Nin-PA in cuneiform. The sign PA was read as ĝidru in Sumerian and ḫaṭṭum in Akkadian, and it was the most commonly used logogram representing a scepter. Both elements of the name could be prefaced by the dingir sign, a determinative used to designate names of deities, which indicates that the object itself, rather than just the goddess representing it, was viewed as divine. Other deities possibly also personifying scepters are known from Mesopotamian texts, for example PA-Igidu and PA.KAL from Girsu. It is presumed that Ninĝidru due to her character played a role in coronation rituals.

Doubts have been expressed in the past over whether Ninĝidru is the correct reading of the name, but this transcription or variants of it have been employed in recent publications by various authors. Christopher Metcalf accepts it as a plausible option, though he notes that a second possible reading is Ninĝešduru. Antonie Cavigneaux and Manfred Krebernik have originally raised objections to the reading Ninĝidru based on the spelling ^{d}Nin-PA-da, which according to them is more likely to be read as Ninḫada or even Bēlat-ḫaṭṭa. However, Armando Bramanti more recently concluded that this spelling is uncommon, and does not necessarily represent the same word as the sign PA on its own usually does, which makes ĝidru the most plausible option in most cases.

The Reallexikon der Assyriologie und Vorderasiatischen Archäologie entry written by Cavigneaux and Krebernik considers Ninĝidru to be female, and this assumption is also accepted by other authors. An alternate view, originally proposed by Harriet Martin, is that the deity was male and should be understood as analogous to Nuska. More recently Metcalf in his commentary on a hymn focused on the deities of Shuruppak refers to Ninĝidru as male as well. However, Jeremiah Peterson in his review of the translation calls her a goddess.

== Associations with other deities ==
In sources such as a coronation ritual from Uruk and many offering lists from the Ur III period Ninĝidru appears alongside Ninmena, a goddess regarded as the deification of the crown.

Ninĝidru fulfills the role of a sukkal in a hymn to Sud, the tutelary goddess of Shuruppak, where she is described receiving visitors to her mistress' temple. This text also mentions king Bur-Suen of Isin and on linguistic grounds it has been concluded that it represents a typical example of an Old Babylonian composition written in Sumerian. Ninĝidru is also mentioned alongside Sud in a fragment of an inscription from Shuruppak from the Sargonic period, in which a nameless ensi of this city dedicates a statue for the life of Rimush. Jeremiah Peterson notes the association between these two goddesses and Ninĝidru's specific role within the court of Sud might both go back to a very early period of Mesopotamian history.

== Worship ==
Ninĝidru is attested as an actively worshiped deity in sources ranging from between the Early Dynastic to Old Babylonian period. She appears most frequently in sources from Shuruppak, though it was not the only city where she was worshiped. An early seal might mention a priest in her service, though this remains uncertain. The erection of a statue of Ninĝidru mentioned in inscriptions of Ur-Nanshe of Lagash most likely took place in Shuruppak too. Various theophoric names invoking Ninĝidru are known, with Ur-Ninĝidru apparently being popular in Early Dynastic Shuruppak.

Further cities where Ninĝidru was worshiped include Adab and Umma, where a statue of her was kept in the temple of Damgalnunna according to a source from the Ur III period. A coronation ritual from the Eanna temple, which according to Jeremiah Peterson cannot be dated with certainty, mentions Ninĝidru alongside Ninmena.

Ninĝidru is absent from the god list An = Anum, though in a similar Old Babylonian text regarded as its forerunner she appears near the end of the section dedicated to Enlil.
