= Ninmena =

Mesopotamian goddess

Ninmena (Sumerian: 𒀭𒎏𒃞𒈾, ^{d}NIN.MEN.NA) was a Mesopotamian goddess who represented the deified crown. She was closely associated with the deified scepter, Ninĝidru, and with various goddesses of birth, such as Ninhursag.

== Name and character ==
The name Ninmena means "mistress of the crown," and is an example of a typical Sumerian theonym formed as a combination of the cuneiform sign nin and the name of a location or object. It is not certain if the goddess Men ("crown") known from the Early Dynastic Zame Hymns, apparently worshiped in Uruk and Sippar, should be considered analogous to Ninmena. However, the deity ^{d}Men or ^{d}Men-na known from late copies of the Weidner god list is agreed to be a form of Ninmena.

Ninmena appears among the nine goddesses of birth enumerated after Šulpae in the Nippur god list and in a similar enumeration of six deities in the Isin god list, but she is absent from the analogous section of An = Anum, which only lists Ninhursag, Ninmah, Dingirmaḫ, Aruru and Nintur. It is a matter of scholarly debate if by the Old Babylonian period these names were understood as belonging to different goddesses who came to be conflated with each other, or local variants of a single deity. Joan Goodnick Westenholz argued that in the case of Ninmena, syncretism would be limited to literary texts. The so-called Archive of Mystic Heptads labels Ninmena as the "Bēlet-ilī of the city of Utab" alongside other goddesses of birth and their cult centers.

== In textual sources ==
Multiple sources attest the existence of a connection between Ninmena and the deified scepter, Ninĝidru. Both are mentioned in a coronation ritual text connected to the Eanna temple which according to Jeremiah Peterson cannot be dated with certainty.

The Song of the hoe describes Ninmena as an initiator of both kingship and fertility: "the lady who has given birth to the ruler, who had given birth to the king, now set (alĝaĝa) human reproduction in motion."

A hymn attributed to the Sealand Dynasty mentions Ninmena in association with Nippur as a caretaker of the "Lady-of-Nippur" (Nin-Nibru) though a connection between her and this city is not present in any other known sources.

A lexical text from Emar presents Ninmena as analogous to the Hurrian mountain goddess Lelluri.
