= Uridimmu =

Mesopotamian mythical creature

Ur(i)dimmu, meaning "Mad/howling Dog" or Langdon's "Gruesome Hound", (Sumerian: 𒌨𒅂UR.IDIM and giš.pirig.gal = ur-gu-lu-ú = ur-idim-[mu] in the lexical series ḪAR.gud = imrû = ballu), was an ancient Mesopotamian mythical creature in the form of a human headed dog-man whose first appearance might be during the Kassite period, if the Agum-Kakrime Inscription proves to be a copy of a genuine period piece. He is pictured standing upright, wearing a horned tiara and holding a staff with an uskaru, or lunar crescent, at the tip. The lexical series ḪAR-ra=ḫubullu describes him as a kalbu šegû, "rabid dog".

== Mythology ==
His appearance was essentially the opposite, or complement of that of Ugallu, with a human head replacing that of an animal and an animal's body replacing that of a human. He appears in later iconography paired with Kusarikku, "Bull-Man", a similar anthropomorphic character, as attendants to the god Šamaš. He is carved as a guardian figure on a doorway in Aššur-bāni-apli's north palace at Nineveh. He appears as an intercessor with Marduk and Zarpanītu for the sick in rituals. He was especially revered in the Eanna in Uruk during the neo-Babylonian period where he seems to have taken on a cultic role, where the latest attestation was in the 29th year of Darius I.

As one of the eleven spawn of Tiamat in the Enûma Eliš vanquished by Marduk, he was displayed as a trophy on doorways to ward off evil and later became an apotropaic figurine buried in buildings for a similar purpose. He became identified as MUL- or ^{d}UR.IDIM with the constellation known by the Greeks as Wolf (Lupus).
