= Jack C. Hayya =

American engineer and academic

Jack C. Hayya (March 10, 1929 – December 11, 2018) was a professor of management science at the Pennsylvania State University.

== Education ==
- B.S., Civil Engineering, University of Illinois Urbana-Champaign, 1952
- M.S., Management, California State University, Northridge, 1961
- Ph.D., Business Administration, University of California, Los Angeles, 1966

== Personal ==
In 1947, the government of Iraq sent him to study engineering in the United States. During his undergraduate years he lived in the Cosmopolitan fraternity house at the University of Illinois at Urbana-Champaign, mostly with other foreign students. He was an engineer on some large public works projects before returning to academia.

== Publications (partial list) ==
- He, Xin James, Kim, Jeon G., Hayya, Jack C. The cost of lead-time variability: The case of the exponential distribution.
- Ramasesh, Ranga V., Fu, Haizhen, Fong, Duncan K. H., Hayya, Jack C. Lot streaming in multistage production systems.
- Hong, Jae-Dong, Hayya, Jack C. Just-In-Time purchasing: Single or multiple sourcing?.
- Jack Hayya, Roger Pfaffenberger. Student Workbook for Use with Statistical Methods for Business and Economics. Paperback. June 1987. McGraw-Hill Education. ISBN 978-0-256-03665-7. LC 0256036659.
