= Haya de Herguijuela =

Coordinates: 40°27′04.7″N 6°04′45.1″W

The Haya de Herguijuela (Spanish for beech of Herguijela) is a large, solitary specimen of European beech growing on an east-facing slope of the Sierra de Francia, near the town of Herguijuela de la Sierra. One of the last relicts of the beech forests that used to exist in the Sistema Central region of Spain, it is also nearly the southernmost specimen of the European beech in Iberia, surpassed only by a similar tree in nearby Cáceres province.

The European beech used to be fairly common in the western Sistema Central, evidenced by local flora that is characteristic of beech forests. However, the forests were decimated by energy demands after the Industrial Revolution as beechwood makes excellent charcoal. Coupled with shifting climate patterns, the species has not made a recovery in the area even with the elimination of wood as an energy source. Apart from the haya de Herguijuela and its twin, the last remaining beech stand in central Spain is a forest in the northern reaches of the Sierra de Guadarrama in Soria.

== See also ==
- Salamanca province
- Cáceres province
- European beech
- Climate
