= Mandanu =

Mesopotamian god

- God of justice
- Major cult center: Babylon

Genealogy
- Spouse: Gula

Mandanu or Madanu was a Mesopotamian god associated with justice. It has been proposed that he was a divine representation of places of judgment. He is known chiefly from sources postdating the Old Babylonian period, and older documents, such as the Nippur god list, do not mention him. He was worshiped mostly in the north of Babylonia, especially in the city of Babylon itself. He was regarded as one of the deities belonging to the circle of Marduk.

== Character ==
Mandanu's name was written as either ^{d}ma-da-nu or ^{d}man-da-nu, with the latter spelling considered a secondary development. It is most likely derived from the word diānum, "to judge." The logographic writing ^{d}DI.KU_{5} is also attested, though the same signs could also be read as the theonym Ištaran. His primary role was that of a divine judge. Manfred Krebernik proposes he might have originally been understood as the deification of places of judgment.

According to the god list An = Anum and the incantation series Šurpu, Mandanu belonged to the circle of Marduk, in whose court he fulfilled the role of guzalû, variously translated as "throne-bearer," "chamberlain" or "herald." Manfred Krebernik argues that the contexts in which this term appears would indicate that it was associated with judicial power.

== Associations with other deities ==
In two passages of the topographical text Tintir = Babilu, Mandanu appears alongside the god Muštēšir-ḫablim, elsewhere described as "the ugallu (a lion-like mythical being) of Babylon." It has been proposed that he was a similar judge deity. He might have represented one of Marduk's weapons. In Šurpu, Mandanu instead appears alongside Enlil's guzalû Ennugi.

Andrew R. George proposes that in Babylon, Mandanu functioned as the spouse of Gula. Irene Sibbing-Plantholt notes that apparently he took the role of Ninurta in relation to this goddess in Babylon.

Manfred Krebernik argues that while well attested as a courtier of Marduk, Mandanu might have originally belonged to the circle of Enlil, citing the occasional equation with Nuska as possible evidence.

== Worship ==
The oldest attestations of Mandanu postdate the end of the Old Babylonian period, with only a single uncertain mention in an earlier text from Larsa. A single theophoric name invoking him has been identified in the text corpus from Kassite Nippur. He was worshiped chiefly in northern Babylonia, though attestations from the southern city of Uruk and from Assyria are known too. Additionally, an inscription of Šamaš-reš-uṣur indicates that he introduced Mandanu to the city Āl-gabbāri-bānî in Suhum.

In inscriptions of Esarhaddon and Ashurbanipal, Mandanu appears among the principal deities of the city of Babylon. He had a temple in this city, possibly located in the proximity of the Esagil. It bore the ceremonial Sumerian name Erabriri, "house of the shackle which holds in check," also applied to temples of Pabilsag and Ennugi in lexical lists. A cella of Mandanu bearing the same name also existed in Kish. Andrew R. George points out that Mandanu and Ennugi occupied the same position in the respective courts of Marduk and Enlil, which according to him might explain the identical names of their temples. A gate located in Babylon, the Gate of Praise (ká ka-tar-ra), could also be referred to as the Gate of the Entry of Madanu (ká né-rib ^{d}DI.KU_{5}), presumably in reference to a formal occasion during which he was believed to leave the city, according to Wilfred G. Lambert perhaps to be connected with a reference to this god "going to Ḫursagkalamma" (Kish) known from a commentary on the Enūma Eliš. According to Andrew R. George, this structure was the gate of his temple. A socle dedicated to Madanu, the Enigerimnudib, "house which lets not evil pass," was located in the grand court (kisalmaḫ) of the Esagil temple complex in Babylon, probably to the south of the main structure itself. Another socle of Mandanu located elsewhere within it, in the A-suda, was known as Edumununna, "house of the son of a prince." It is also possible that the Epirig, "house of the lion," which was located in the same complex, was dedicated to him.

While Mandanu is absent from the Weidner god list or the Nippur god list, tablet VII of An = Anum contains only various names attributed to him or to Marduk. It is assumed that it was a late addition.
