= Haya Party =

Political party in Egypt

Haya Party حزب الحياة
- Leader: Mikel Mounir
- Ideology: Liberalism; Secularism; Coptic interests
- House of Representatives: 0 / 568

Website
- http://www.hayaparty.org/

The Haya Party (Arabic: حزب الحياة; translated as Life Party) is a political party started by Coptic activist Mikel Mounir.
