= Mullissu =

Assyrian goddess

Mullissu is a goddess who is the consort of the Assyrian god Asshur. Mullissu may be identical with the Sumerian goddess Ninlil, wife of the god Enlil, which would parallel the fact that Asshur himself was modeled on Enlil. Mullissu's name was written ^{d}nin.líl. Mullissu is identified with Ishtar of Nineveh in the Neo-Assyrian Empire times.

Also proposed to be Mullissu is a goddess whom Herodotus called Mylitta and identified with Aphrodite. The name Mylitta may derive from Mulliltu or Mullitta, the Babylonian variant of Mullissu, where one cult was connected with the é-kur in Nippur and the other with Kish (Sumer). Mulliltum was an epithet of Ninlil which appears as Mullissu in Neo-Assyrian as the wife of god Ashur. She is spelled mlš, here also as the consort of Asshur (’šr), in the Sfire inscription (A8) from Syria inscribed in Old Aramaic (eighth century BCE). Her Late Babylonian cult is reflected in the spelling mwlyt (Mulit) as transmitted in the Mandaic magical corpus of late antiquity.
