= Weidner god list =

Scholarly list of Mesopotamian deities

Weidner god list is the conventional name of one of the known ancient Mesopotamian lists of deities, originally compiled by ancient scribes in the late third millennium BCE, with the oldest known copy dated to the Ur III or the Isin-Larsa period. Further examples have been found in many excavated Mesopotamian cities, and come from between the Old Babylonian period and the fourth century BCE. It is agreed the text served as an exercise for novice scribes, but the principles guiding the arrangement of the listed deities remain unknown. In later periods, philological research led to the creation of extended versions providing explanations of the names of individual deities.

In the second millennium BCE, the Weidner god list spread outside Mesopotamia, with copies known from Emar, Ugarit and Amarna. Hurrian and Ugaritic scribes compiled multilingual editions providing information about correspondences between Mesopotamian, Hurrian and Ugaritic deities, but due to a number of peculiarities characteristic for these texts, it is presumed they do not necessarily accurately reflect contemporary religious beliefs.

== History ==
The term Weidner god list is derived from the name of its original publisher, Assyriologist Ernst Weidner. Weidner prepared a collation of the text in 1924, relying on various fragments originating in different locations and time periods. No standardized edition is presently available. While the incipit of the original text indicates that it was referred to simply as An, the modern name is used more commonly to refer to it in Assyriological literature.

The Weidner god list was one of the standard Mesopotamian god lists. The earliest examples of such texts come from Early Dynastic Fara (Shuruppak). However, none are known from between the twenty sixth century BCE and the beginning of the second millennium BCE, and there is no clear indication that the early lists directly influenced the Weidner god list. The oldest known exemplar, VAT 6563, most likely originates in the Isin-Larsa period, though sometimes origin in the preceding Ur III period is also proposed. While many of the god lists composed later are only known from a single city, with unique Old Babylonian compositions of this genre found in Nippur, Uruk, Isin, Susa, Mari and possibly Ur, the Weidner god list has been described as "chronologically and geographically widespread". Multiple tablets come from the Old Babylonian period from Babylon, Sippar, Ṭābatum (Tell Taban) and Nippur. In later times, the list is attested in Middle Babylonian Nippur and various "peripheral" locations, Middle Assyrian Assur, and Neo-Babylonian Babylon, Kish, Nippur and Uruk. It remained in circulation until the Late Babylonian period, as late as in the fourth century BCE.

== Contents ==
The character of the Weidner god list has been described as "pedagogic". A number of copies have been identified as scribal exercises. It is agreed that its use as part of scribal school curriculum was widespread at least since the Middle Babylonian period, though it might have already fulfilled such a role in some locations in the Old Babylonian period. It was studied in the beginning of scribal education. Apprentice scribes were expected to copy increasingly complex lexical lists, starting with enumerations of signs arranged based on similar shapes of the first wedges or pronunciation, and eventually progressing to similar compilations of various words, arranged thematically, for example based on accompanying determinative, as in the case of lists of names deities. Familiarizing scribes with the composition of the pantheon was most likely one of the aspects of passing down an idealized concept of shared Sumero-Akkadian heritage.

The Weidner god list has the form of a single-column enumeration of theonyms, starting with An and continuing with a variety of other Mesopotamian deities, both well-attested and obscure. The standard Old Babylonian version has 245 entries, but it remains uncertain what principles their arrangement follows. Some deities of similar character, for example birth goddesses or local manifestations of Inanna, are listed in sequence, but this rule is not universal, as Gula, Ninkarrak and Ninisina, all similarly associated with healing, occur separately from each other. According to Wilfred G. Lambert, it is difficult to tell if a single principle was followed in the compilers, and multiple originally separate short lists were likely joined to form the Weidner god list. In a more recent assessment Aaron Tugendhaft adopts a similar position and notes that for example, only the beginning of the list follows a clear hierarchical order. The exact contents of the list vary between copies, as new entries could be added with time. For example, Ara appears only in copies postdating the Old Babylonian period, with the exception of a single tablet from Tell Taban. Other examples of deities only present in later editions include Idlurugu, Magalla and Nin-Eanna.

While most of the known copies follow the single column standard, the compilers of late versions could add more, for example, three fragments from Assur include explanations of the names of the listed deities in a second column, while one has a total of four additional ones, with information about pronunciation, names of the cuneiform signs used to write a given name and explanatory notes. While some such copies equate individual deities with each other, due to their late date they cannot necessarily be treated as a representation of universally followed theology. In the case of some entries, for example, the equation between Qudma (^{d}KU_{5}) and Mandanu (^{d}DI.KU_{5}), they depend only on the phonetic or graphic similarity between theonyms. Such variants did not serve as scribal exercises, but instead most likely constitute an ancient example of philological research.

== Outside Mesopotamia ==
Through the second millennium BCE, the Weidner god list diffused through Upper Mesopotamia and beyond, as evidenced by copies found in Ugarit, Emar and Amarna. Versions from the first two of these cities, dating to the thirteenth century BCE, added new columns: a Hurrian one in both cases and a third Ugaritic one only in the former. As the copies match each other, most likely Ugaritic scribes worked with preexisting Hurrian editions, presumably meant to facilitate bilingual scribal education.

The goal of the multilingual editions was apparently to show correspondences between deities from the Mesopotamian, Hurrian and Ugaritic pantheons. For example, Utu corresponds to Šimige and Shapash, who also were solar deities. However, the size of local western pantheons was comparatively smaller, leading to multiple Mesopotamian deities being presented as corresponding to a single Hurrian or Ugaritic one. For the same reason, some of the Hurrian entries appear to be phonetic transcriptions of Mesopotamian names, and might not represent actively worshiped deities. Other entries appear to be innovation of scholars, for example the goddess Ašte Kumurbineve, "wife of Kumarbi", is most likely meant to mirror the etymological connection between the corresponding entries in the first column, Enlil and Ninlil. Some entries might have been reinterpreted for theological reasons, for example while a Hurrian form of the goddess Aya is attested, in the Ugaritic list her name is reinterpreted as an uncommon spelling of Ea and therefore equated with Eyan (a Hurrian variant of Ea) and Kothar, a local god of similar character, presumably to avoid the implications that the goddess Shapash, the counterpart of Aya's husband, had a wife. A further commonly noted peculiar aspect of the trilingual list is the fact that Baal, the Ugaritic weather god, is equated with the goddess Imzuanna. This might be the result of either a mistake or scribal wordplay relying on the use of the sign IM as a logogram representing names of weather gods. For these reasons, neither the Hurrian nor Ugaritic columns are treated as an accurate reflections of, respectively, Hurrian religion and Ugaritic religion, but merely as scribal innovations.

== See also ==
- An = Anum
- Ugaritic texts
