= Tākultu =

Mesopotamian religious ceremony

Tākultu was a type of religious ceremony in ancient Mesopotamia. It took the form of a ritual banquet during which a king offered drinks to deities. The oldest attestations have been identified in texts from Babylonia from the Old Babylonian period, though as early as during the reign of Shamshi-Adad I tākultu started to be performed in Upper Mesopotamia as well. Assyrian references are available from the Middle Assyrian and Neo-Assyrian periods. During the reign of the Sargonid dynasty the goal of the ritual was to create a link between the center of the Neo-Assyrian Empire and its peripheries by invoking deities from various locations to bless the king.

== Name ==
The term tākultu is derived from the Akkadian verb akālu, "to eat", and can be literally translated as "banquet" or "festive meal". The corresponding Sumerian term is gišbun, a possible loanword (from Akkadian kispum), logographically written as KI.KAŠ.GAR (literally "place where beer is put"). The ceremony designated by it has accordingly been characterized as a type of food offering, a "banquet ritual". Neo-Assyrian sources indicate that it involved a king offering beverages to deities. William W. Hallo notes the development of the religious meaning of tākultu reflects a broader phenomenon of Mesopotamian cultic terms being derived from everyday language.

== Early attestations ==
=== Babylonia ===
According to Stefan Maul is possible that tākultu developed from earlier rituals focused on Enlil. The oldest references to it have been identified in texts from Babylonia from the Old Babylonian period.

William W. Hallo suggested that the myth Lugalbanda in the Mountain Cave describes a tākultu. In the relevant passage, Lugalbanda prepares a feast consisting of the meat of goats and aurochs and various alcoholic beverages, and invites An, Enlil, Enki and Ninhursag to partake in it. The term used to designate it is Sumerian gišbun, known from other sources to be a translation of tākultu.

A single text from the Sealand refers to preparation of food for a tākultu, though Odette Boivin notes there is no evidence that a distinct festival is meant, and assumes the passage deals with nindabû, a well attested monthly food offering.

Only three attestations of the term tākultu have been identified in Middle Babylonian texts, and it is not clear if the religious ceremony or a regular banquet is meant in each of these cases.

=== Other areas ===
Tākultu was also incorporated into the traditions of Upper Mesopotamia. It is already mentioned in an inscription of Shamshi-Adad I, which seemingly indicates it was held in Assur during his reign. The surviving copy (Louvre A 889) is a tablet discovered in the royal palace of Mari, though it is presumed that the formula was also inscribed on votive objects mentioned in it.

References to tākultu held in Assur, specifically in the temple of Ashur, reappear in Middle Assyrian texts from the reigns of Adad-nirari I and his successor Shalmaneser I. Inscriptions on fragments of pots and jars indicate it was held at least three or four times during the reign of the former and at least three times during the reign of the latter.

== Neo-Assyrian attestations ==
=== Overview ===
No attestations of tākultu are available from between the reign of Shalmaneser I and the ascent of the Sargonid dynasty to the throne of the Neo-Assyrian Empire. Stefan Maul argues that it is nonetheless possible it continued to be performed through the rest of the Middle Assyrian period, and through the entire Neo-Assyrian period. Versions from the reigns of Sennacherib, Esarhaddon, Ashurbanipal, Aššur-etil-ilāni and Sîn-šar-iškun are known. Individual copies have been discovered during excavations in Assur, Nineveh and Sultantepe. While Maul states tākultu was presumably performed in Assur in the temple of Ashur, Beate Pongratz-Leisten notes that the geographic distribution of the texts might indicate the ritual was performed simultaneously in multiple cities, or alternatively more than once during the reign of a single ruler. Surviving colophons indicate the texts were prepared by high ranking courtiers, such as the astrologer Issar-šumu-ēreš and the exorcist Kiṣir-Aššur, advisors of Esarhaddon and Ashurbanipal.

Pongratz-Leisten notes that the Neo-Assyrian tākultu texts do not focus on ritual consumption. However, the new form of the ritual added a distinct spatial dimension to it, with binding the peripheries of the Neo-Assyrian Empire to its center as a primary goal. Deities from various areas were invoked to bless the king, the city of Assur and Assyria as a whole.

In contrast with many other Neo-Assyrian ritual texts, surviving tākultu copies do not contain detailed performance instructions, save for the version from the reign of Sennacherib.

=== Invoked deities ===
==== Mesopotamian deities ====
Neo-Assyrian tākultu texts contain long lists of invoked deities. They are considered an important source of information about the pantheons of Assyrian cities, though John MacGinnis stresses they do not mention every single deity worshiped in this area.

Most of the deities listed were associated with Assur. In some cases, their groupings reflect traditions of this city dating back as early as to the reign of Erishum I; for example, a group of divine judges from the temple of Ashur first mentioned in his inscriptions still appears in Neo-Assyrian tākultu. Deities from other major Assyrian cities (for example Nineveh, Kurbail or Arbail) are also enumerated, and near the end of a list these worshiped in more remote parts of the empire could be mentioned too. For example, the tākultu from the reign of Sennacherib mentions deities from Babylonia, such as Ištaran and Šarrat-Deri from Der.

More than one manifestation of a deity could be mentioned in the same text, for example different manifestations of Ashur, some of which constitute examples of syncretism between him and other deities. A tākultu from the reign of Ashurbanipal lists both Sin and Shamash twice. In the Sennacherib tākultu Ebiḫ is listed thrice, twice as a personified deity and once as a mountain. However, Spencer L. Allen notes in some cases the same theonym is used multiple times to designate distinct deities, for example Ishtars associated with specific cities. Barbara Nevling Porter points out that in the version from the reign of Ashurbanipal Ishtar, Ishtar of Arbela and "Lady of Nineveh" (Ishtar of Nineveh) are treated as separate.

==== Foreign deities ====
Foreign deities could be mentioned in tākultu alongside Mesopotamian ones. The tākultu from the reign of Ashurbanipal includes Hurrian Kumarbi, Nabarbi, Samnuha, Nupatik ("Umbidaki"), Ninatta and Kulitta, Hittite Pirwa ("Birua"), Urartian Haldi-aṣira, Elamite Napriš, Iabrītu and Narundi, and Iranian Ahura Mazda ("Assara-maza"). Alfonso Archi additionally argues that the deity Iblaītu might be Išḫara invoked under a title stressing her association with Ebla, which he assumes the Assyrians might have been aware of because of contact with Hurrians.

In some cases, such as those of Narundi and the Hurrian deities, it is not certain if the inclusion in tākultu reflected the existence of contemporary Assyrian cults, or only constituted a reference to earlier accounts.

==== Deified objects and natural features ====
In addition to gods, the lists in tākultu could also include deified cultic paraphernalia such as standards (šurinnu; one example is the standard of Ashur mentioned in the Sennacherib tākultu) and statues representing apotropaic creatures, including lions, leopards, bulls, anzû birds, lahmu and kurību (griffins). Representations of kings placed in temples could also be mentioned, including depictions of Tiglath-Pileser III and Eriba-Adad, a stele presumed to represent Ashurbanipal and a number of representations of unspecified kings and princes from the temple of Ashur in Assur. Furthermore, natural features could be included as well. In the Ashurbanipal tākultu celestial bodies are invoked, though it is not certain if this reflects an influence of similar passages in Assyrian treaties, or merely the personal preference of the tablet's copyist Issar-šumu-ēreš, who was an astrologer.

== Related rituals ==
Other Mesopotamian ritual terms with similar meaning to tākultu include naptanu (Sumerian bur; "ceremonial banquet") and qerītu ("banquet festival").

Beate Pongratz-Leisten argues certain conventions present in Neo-Assyrian tākultu texts, for example the inclusion of deified natural features, constitute a survival of tradition originating in the Syro-Anatolian cultural sphere, where they commonly occur in treaties. She notes deified mountains, rivers and regions are otherwise absent from Assyrian rituals, but occur in Old Babylonian texts from Tell Leilan, as well as in Hurrian and Hittite sources. Volkert Haas considered it "indisputable" that features of Neo-Assyrian tākultu reflected Hittite influence.

Gary Beckman notes that similar Akkadian terminology pertaining to food offerings appears both in tākultu and in a set of incantations from Hattusa designated by the term babilili and focused on invoking Pinikir (CTH 718), but concludes that this is insufficient to establish whether one of these ceremonies influenced the other. He notes that while written mostly in Akkadian, and presumably based on a Mesopotamian forerunners, the corpus of babilili texts is ultimately largely unique.
