= Epithets of Inanna =

Titles of the Mesopotamian goddess

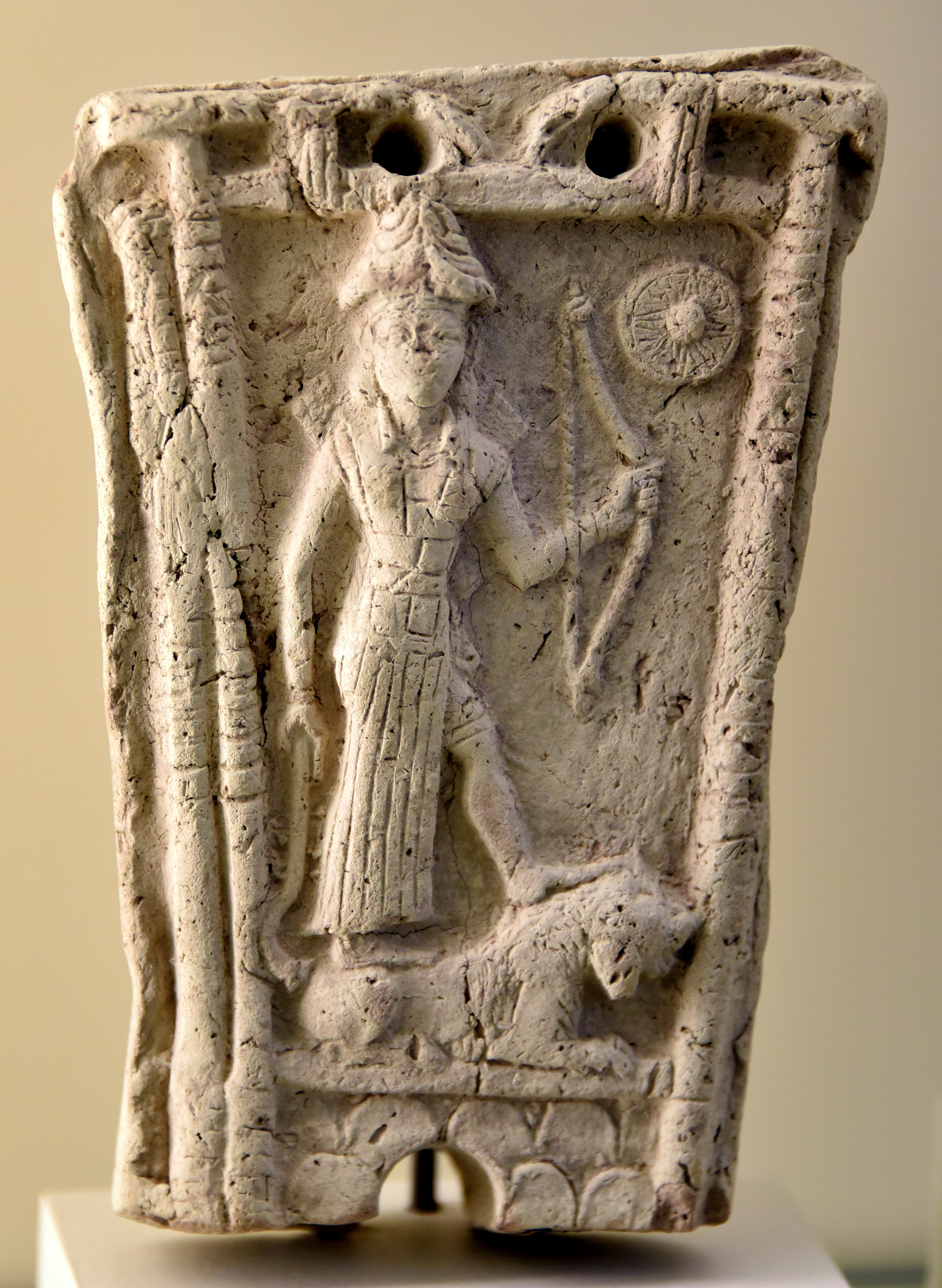
A terracotta plaque depicting armed Inanna/Ishtar standing on a lion. Her association with these animals was exemplied by the epithet Labbattu.

Epithets of Inanna were titles and bynames used to refer to this Mesopotamian goddess and to her Akkadian counterpart Ishtar. In Mesopotamia, epithets were commonly used in place of the main name of the deity, and combinations of a name with an epithet similar to these common in ancient Greek religion are comparatively uncommon. Inanna had more titles than any other Mesopotamian deity. They pertained to her associations with specific cities or areas, such as Uruk, Zabalam, Akkad, Nineveh, or the Sealand. Others instead highlighted her specific roles, for example, that of an astral goddess personifying the planet Venus—or that of a war deity. In some cases, her individual epithets eventually developed into separate deities.

== Overview ==
In ancient Mesopotamia, epithets could either be used alongside the primary name of a given deity, or instead of it. The latter practice was widespread in religious texts, while standard combinations of a name with an epithet, comparable to these widespread in ancient Greek religion, were relatively uncommon. The primary purpose of such titles was "outlining the essential qualities, activities, functions, genealogy, and hierarchical position of a given deity." The most archaic cuneiform texts from the Uruk period indicate that Inanna was already worshiped under a number of titles in Uruk at the time. According to Frans Wiggermann, she was the Mesopotamian deity with the highest number of such secondary names, with only Nergal having a comparable number of them. Over seventy names of Inanna are listed in the god list An = Anum alone. In various compositions, seven individual names of this goddess could be given at a time. A possible example can be found in the Archive of Mystic Heptads. In one case, a hymn enumerating epithets of Inanna simply refers to them as "names" (mu).

Many of Inanna's epithets start with the words nin or bēlet, both of which can be translated as "lady." Nin is a common element of Sumerian theonyms, which typically combine it with a toponym or another noun. Bēlet analogously occurs in Akkadian ones, not necessarily only in epithets of Inanna, as evidenced by the existence of independent goddesses such as Bēlet-Nagar ("Lady of Nagar") and Bēlet-Apim ("Lady of Apum"). A third common type of similar epithets, starting with Šarrat ("queen"), is first attested in the Old Babylonian period in the northern part of Babylonia. However, titles designating manifestations of various deities associated with specific places are already attested in the Early Dynastic period. The Canonical Temple List, which dates to the second half of the Kassite period, mentions at least seventy nine temples in various parts of Mesopotamia dedicated to Inanna or her various manifestations. Cities associated with her include many of the earliest political powers of Mesopotamia, such as Uruk (where she was the most important deity in the Uruk period already), Kish, Umma or Zabalam. In the middle of the third millennium BCE, she was also fused with the Akkadian goddess Ishtar, the goddess of the city of Akkad, possibly with the support of the Sargonic dynasty which ruled Mesopotamia at the time. Groupings of manifestations of Inanna from various geographic locations occur in god lists, such as the Weidner god list and the Nippur god list. In the former case, the exact selection and order of the manifestation varies between copies, though Inanna of Uruk always occurs first. She also opens an analogous section in An = Anum.

Inanna could also be worshiped in astral and martial forms. The former aspect of her character most likely goes back to her prehistory, as she was already understood as a personification of Venus as both morning and evening star based on her titles present in texts from the Uruk period. In An = Anum the astral epithets have their own sub-section, and are separated from other names of Inanna by a list of her servants. It has been suggested that the role of a warrior was originally exclusive to Ishtar and did not belong to the domain of Inanna, but according to Joan Goodnick Westenholz both of them were already complex deities with many roles before the syncretic merge.

In some cases, epithets of Mesopotamian deities could develop into fully distinct figures. Westenholz noted while this phenomenon, which she refers to as "fission of deities", is attested for various members of the Mesopotamian pantheon, it is the most common for epithets of Inanna. Due to the number of her titles, as well as their frequent association with specific places, it has been speculated that there might have been more than one deity named Inanna. Tonia Sharlach argues that the names Inanna and Ishtar were effectively umbrella terms, and many of the local forms had distinct characters. Westenholz pointed out that a plurality of Inannas (^{d}INANA.MEŠ) was worshiped in the second half of the second millennium BCE. Interpretations of individual forms of Inanna as aspects of one deity or as multiple ones could coexist.

== Geographical epithets ==
Epithet	Location	Notes
Akuṣitum	Akus	Akuṣitum (also spelled Akusitum) was the epithet of Inanna as the goddess of Akus, attested in royal inscriptions of the Manāna dynasty near Kish, in a later religious text pertaining to the deities of that city, in the god list An = Anum (tablet IV, line 134), and in the name of one of the gates of Babylon.
Ašibti UNUG^{ki}	Uruk	Ašibti UNUG^{ki}, "Goddess-who-dwells-in-Uruk", is attested as an epithet of Inanna mostly in texts from the first millennium BCE, though it could also be applied to one of her courtiers, Uṣur-amāssu.
Aššurītu	Assyria	Aššurītu, "the Assyrian", is attested as an epithet of an Assyrian form of Ishtar, though it is also possible this title was applied to Ashur's wife Mullissu and to the goddess Šerua.
Ayyabītu	Sealand	Ayyabītu, "the Sealander", is listed among manifestations of Ishtar associated with specific locations in two of the known copies of An = Anum as the explanation of ^{d}INANNA-A.AB.BA^{ki}, "Ishtar of the Sealand" (tablet IV, line 128). A possible reference to her also occurs in the omen series Šumma ālu. According to Odette Boivin, she represents the royal cult of Ishtar in the court of the First Sealand Dynasty.
Batirītum	Batir	Batirītum, "she of the city of Batir", was worshiped in the eponymous settlement, which corresponds to modern Tell Suleimah, as evidenced by a reference to a guda priest of this goddess in one of the inscriptions from this site. According to Manfred Krebernik, she is attested as the name of a manifestation of Inanna alongside Šarratum in a text from Tell Haddad. A text from the Ur III period indicates she was also worshiped in Zimudar, another city located in the Diyala area.
Bēlet-Akkade	Akkad	Bēlet-Akkade, "Lady of Akkad", sometimes written ^{d}NIN-URI, is well attested as an epithet of Ishtar of Akkad. Under this name, she was worshiped in Babylon, as still attested in inscriptions of Nabonidus. Her temple in this city was known under the ceremonial name Emašdari, "house of animal offerings". Bēlet-Akkade is also attested as the theophoric element in personal names, for example in Old Babylonian Mari and in Kassite Nippur. Samsi-Addu in a letter to Yasmaḫ-Addu in which he complains about the latter commissioning more statues of various deities than he can afford singles out a statue of Bēlet-Akkade among them.
Bēlet-Bābili	Babylon	The title Bēlet-Bābili, "Lady of Babylon", referred to a local manifestation of Ishtar from this city. Her temple bore the ceremonial name Eturkalamma ("house, cattle pen of the land") and is mentioned in the inscriptions of many rulers, from Hammurabi (though in a prayer from the Old Babylonian period it is dedicated to Annunitum, not Bēlet-Bābili) to Nabonidus, and even later in texts from the Parthian period. It is possible that Bablīta ("the Babylonian"), a figure attested in late antiquity in Mandaic texts, was a derivative of Bēlet-Bābili.
Bēlet-Ninua	Nineveh	The epithet Bēlet-Ninua referred to Ishtar of Nineveh. She was also worshiped in Assur and in Babylon, in both cases in temples bearing the ceremonial name Egišḫurankia, "house of ordinances of heaven and the underworld".
Bēlet-Uruk	Uruk	The epithet Bēlet-Uruk, which can be translated as "Lady of Uruk", was usually written in cuneiform as ^{d}GAŠAN šá UNUG^{ki}; the correct reading is confirmed by phonetic syllabic spellings from inscriptions of Nebuchadnezzar II and Esarhaddon. According to Paul-Alain Beaulieu an analogous epithet with the element šarrat ("queen") referred to Nanaya, rather than Inanna. Similarity to the theonym Ninunug (Ninirigal) is most likely accidental due to temporal differences, as the former is attested as a distinct deity in the Early Dynastic period.
Dīrītum	Dīr	Dīrītum (Dērītum) is attested as a presumed epithet of Ishtar in texts from Old Babylonian Mari, though it has been proposed that with time she underwent a similar process to Annunitum and became a distinct deity. The identification of this theonym as a title of Ishtar is only attested in a single text, an Old Babylonian god list, and in the past the identity of the goddess was a subject of debate among researchers. While in early scholarship it was assumed she was associated with the eastern city of Der, it now agreed she was named after a settlement located close to Mari, which served as one of the religious centers of the kingdom centered on that city. She is well attested in texts from the reign of Zimri-Lim.
Ḫišamītum	Ḫišamta	Ḫišamītum, "Lady of Ḫišamta", was one of the epithets of Ishtar used in Old Babylonian Mari. Her cult center was located close to Terqa. She is also attested in an Old Babylonian bird omen compendium alongside Išḫara.
Iblaītu	Ebla	It has been suggested that Iblaītu, known from the Assyrian tākultu rituals, is a title of Ishtar, though according to Alfonso Archi Išḫara might be meant instead due to her traditional association with the city of Ebla. He assumes she reached Assyria in the Middle Assyrian period through Hurrian mediation.
Kišītum	Kish	Kišītum, "the goddess of Kish", is attested as the name of Inanna of Kish in god lists, in an Old Babylonian offering list from Mari, and in a theophoric name from the same city. The local form of the goddess was considered distinct from Inanna of Uruk, and they were worshiped separately from each other in Kish.
Kitītum	Kiti	Kiti was a small settlement located near Eshnunna; a temple dedicated to a local form of Inanna, Kitītum, was built there in the second half of the Larsa period. If the proposed identification of BU+BU.KALAM^{ki} from the Zame Hymns with Kiti is accepted, she seemingly replaced the god Amgalnuna as its tutelary deity. He was a figure of minor importance and is not attested in any sources postdating the Early Dynastic period.
Lagabītum Lakuppītu?	Lagaba	Lagabītum is attested as the alternate name of Ishtar of Lagaba, and might correspond to Lakuppītu, a deity worshiped in Isin presumably associated with the underworld.
Narāmti A.AB.BA	Sealand	The epithet narāmti A.AB.BA, possibly "beloved of the Sealand", is applied to Ishtar in the royal epic of king Gulkišar, in which she aids this ruler in battle.
Nin-Aratta	Aratta	Nin-Aratta, "Lady of Aratta", is identified as Inanna in An = Anum (tablet IV, line 31) and implicitly in its Old Babylonian forerunner.
Nin-Eanna Bēlet-Eanna	Uruk	The epithet Nin-Eanna, "Lady of Eanna", is derived from the name of Inanna's temple in Uruk. It first appears in the third millennium BCE, with one example found in an inscription of Ur-Nammu. In later periods, it can be found in inscriptions of Karaindash, Kurigalzu I and Marduk-apla-iddina II from Uruk, as well as in multiple god lists. Despite its common usage, it never fully replaced epithets formed with the name of the city of Uruk rather than the temple located in it. Temples dedicated to Inanna as Nin-Eanna existed in Udannu (a city north of Uruk), Babylon and, according to a single text from the Ur III period, in the settlement A-dag-ga^{ki}. In Kish, she was worshiped in Esulimanna ("house of the awesome radiance of heaven") under the name Bēlet-Eanna. According to Andrew R. George, in Babylon two separate temples dedicated to this aspect of the goddess existed, Ekitušĝarza ("house, abode of the regulations") which was located close to the city wall, and Ekitušgirzal ("house, abode of joy") located in the eastern part of the city. The manifestation of the goddess associated with Udannu appears under the name Bēlet-Eanna in a Seleucid text from Uruk dealing with the celebration of the akitu festival of Ishtar as a member of her entourage. In some examples of god lists from peripheral locations Nin-Eanna was interpreted as a fully separate goddess. In texts from Hattusa this name refers to Ishtar of Samuha, according to Gary Beckman most likely to be identified as the deity DINGIR.GE_{6}.
Nin-Ešara	Uruk or Nippur	The epithet Nin-Ešara, "Lady of Ešara", is derived from the name of a temple, but it is uncertain whether the Ešara in Uruk or Nippur is meant. In both cases the name has the same meaning, "house of the universe", but these two temples were not dedicated to the same deity: the older one, located in Nippur, was a part of the Ekur complex and belonged to Enlil, while the newer one in Uruk - to Anu.
Nin-Girgilu	Girgilu	The theonym Nin-Girgilu referred to Inanna as the goddess of Girgilu, either a part of Nippur or a separate nearby settlement. Under this name, she was worshiped in Nippur in the Ur III and early Old Babylonian periods, though a Nin-Girgilu temple also existed in Ur.
Nin-Ḫursaĝkalamma	Kish	The epithet Nin-Ḫursaĝkalamma, "Lady of Ḫursaĝkalamma", was derived from the name of a temple of Inanna located in Kish. In Neo-Babylonian sources this house of worship was instead associated with Ninlil, which might indicate either that the local goddess was understood at this point as an ištaru ("goddess") rather than specifically as Ishtar and therefore could be assigned another name, or that the cult of Ninlil was imposed for political reasons.
Ninibgal	Umma	The epithet Ninibgal, "Lady of Ibgal", is derived from the name of Inanna's temple in Umma, Eibgal. A form without the sign nin is also attested. Ninibgal frequently occurs in texts from the Ur III period. According to Andrew R. George, she might have been worshiped in Isin during the reign of Enlil-bani.
Ninkununa	Ur	Ninkununa is attested as an epithet of Inanna in building inscriptions of Ur-Nammu and Ur-Bau, and according to Manfred Krebernik and Antoine Cavigneaux might have been understood as the designation of a form of this goddess associated with the city of Ur. However, a distinct deity named Ninkununa appears in the god list An = Anum as a minor servant of Inanna's father Nanna.
Nin-me-Kiš	Kish	Nin-me-Kiš, "Lady of the me of Kish" or "Lady representing the me of Kish", is attested as an epithet of Inanna of Kish in An = Anum (tablet IV, line 17).
Nin-me-Nibru	Nippur	Nin-me-Nibru, "Lady of the me of Nippur" or "Lady representing the me of Nippur," is attested as an epithet of Inanna in the god list An = Anum (tablet IV, line 16) with the explanatory gloss šar-rat Ni-pu-ru, "queen of Nippur".
Nin-Ninua	Nineveh	Nin-Ninua was a title of Ishtar referring to the form of this goddess worshiped in Nineveh. According to Joan Goodnick Westenholz, while attested in sources such as a treaty between Assur and Apum found in Tell Leilan, it might have been originally related to Hurrian epithets of Šauška. The latter deity could be called Ninuwawi ("of Nineveh") or Ninuwaḫi ("the Ninevite"). A late instance of the name Šauška being used to refer to the goddess of Nineveh occurs in a text from the reign of Sargon II, in which the king addresses her by this name and seemingly calls her the "dweller in Nineveh" (ra-ši-bat AB×ḪA^{ki}, presumably an error for a-ši-bat AB×ḪA^{ki}).
Nin-Tilmun	Dilmun	Nin-Tilmun, "Lady of Dilmun", occurs among the names of Inanna in the god list An = Anum (tablet IV, line 18), though according to Antoine Cavigneaux and Manfred Krebernik this name might also refer to Ninsikila, the main goddess in the Dilmunite pantheon.
Ninua’itu	Nineveh	Ninua’itu is attested as a title of Ishtar of Nineveh in inscriptions of Shalmaneser I and Tukulti-Ninurta I.
Nin-Zabalam	Zabalam	Nin-Zabalam, "Lady of Zabalam", is well attested as an epithet of Inanna of Zabalam in texts from the Ur III period, chiefly from Umma.
Sugallītum	Zabalam	Sugallītum ("She of Zabalam") is attested as an alternate name of Inanna of Zabalam, derived from the Akkadian form of this toponym, though it has been suggested that the spelling was also influenced by Esugal, the name of the ziggurat of Ishtar of Akkad. Various variants of the name, including logographic ^{d}SU.GAL, are attested in theophoric names and greeting formulas of letters, chiefly from Larsa and Sippar. It is also possible that ^{d}ZA-BA-AD, a theonym known only from an exercise tablet from Susa, is a further analogous logogram.
Supālītum	Zabalam	Supālītum was a byname of Inanna of Zabalam which developed from the Akkadian form of the toponym, with additional influence of a folk etymology connecting it to the term supālu (or sapālu), "juniper". In addition to Zabalam, she is also attested in A-ka-sal_{4}^{ki} (Ur III sources) and Nippur (Old Babylonian sources), while the Canonical Temple List mentions four houses of worship dedicated to her, though the location of only one of them, Muru, is preserved.
Šarrat-Arbaʾil	Arbela	The title Šarrat-Arbaʾil, "Queen of Arbela", referred to the Assyrian Ishtar of Arbela, often paired with Ishtar of Nineveh. It has been argued that in late periods, she was the Assyrian form of Ishtar most commonly associated with martial roles.
Šarrat-Kidmuri	Kalhu	Šarrat-Kidmuri, "Queen of (Bīt-)Kidmuri", was a title of Ishtar derived from the name of her temple in Kalhu, sometimes listed alongside Ishtars of Nineveh and Arbela in Neo-Assyrian letters.
Šarrat-Kiš	Kish	Šarrat-Kiš, "Queen of Kish", is attested as a title of Inanna of Kish, and An = Anum (tablet IV, line 17) explains it as the Akkadian equivalent of Nin-me-Kiš. However, it could also be used as an epithet of Bau.
Šarrat-Ninua	Nineveh	Šarrat-Ninua, "Queen of Nineveh", was a title of Ishtar of Nineveh.
Šarrat-Sipparim	Sippar	Šarrat-Sipparim, "Queen of Sippar," could be an epithet of both Ishtar and of Annunitum, in this city treated as a distinct deity.
Šatru	Milqia	Šatru is attested as an alternate name of the manifestation of Ishtar worshiped in Arbela, associated with her temporary move to Milqia during certain ceremonies.
Šulmānītu	Uru-sa/ilim-ma	Šulmānītu (reading uncertain) occurs as one of the epithets of Inanna in the god list An = Anum (tablet IV, line 132), which explains her as the Ishtar of otherwise unknown place named Uru-sa/ilim-ma, in the past erroneously interpreted as Jerusalem. She was worshiped in Assur in the temple Eku, "shining house".
Ṣā’idītu	Dunnu-ṣā’idi	Ṣā’idītu is the presumed reading of ZA-i-di-tu, an epithet of Inanna attested in the god list An = Anum (tablet IV, line 120; explanation of ^{d}INANNA-NÍG.DIRI-im^{ki}) likely derived from the toponym Dunnu-ṣā’idi.
Ṣarbat	Ṣarbat(um)	The theonym Ishtar-ṣarbat referred to a form of this goddess presumably native to the Middle Euphrates area, most likely linked to the toponym Ṣarbatum, derived from the Akkadian name of the Euphrates poplar. According to Manfred Krebernik, Ṣarbatum might have been a grove rather than a city. Ishtar-ṣarbat is attested in texts from Ebla, Mari and Emar.
Tallā'ītu	Unknown, possibly Talsa	Tallā'ītu, an Akkadian epithet of unknown meaning, occurs in the god list An = Anum (tablet IV, line 131) as an explanation of ^{d}INANNA-^{ĝiš}TAL.SA. Ryan D. Winters tentatively suggests it might be derived from an otherwise unknown toponym, Talsa.
Ulmašītum	Akkad	The epithet Ulmašītum was derived from Eulmaš, a temple of Ishtar in the city of Akkad. In sources from the Ur III period she never appears alone, always alongside Annunitum. Both of them were worshiped in Uruk alongside Inanna. She was regarded as a warlike deity.
Ungal-Nibru Šarrat-Nippuri	Nippur	The Sumerian epithet Ungal-Nibru, "Queen of Nippur", corresponded to Akkadian Šarrat-Nippuri, and should not be confused with Nin-Nibru, a name which did not function as Inanna's epithet.
Urkayītu Urkītum	Uruk	While Urkayītu, "the Urukean", is well attested as a separate deity in documents from Uruk from the Neo-Babylonian period, it is presumed that this name was initially an epithet. The older form, Urkītum, is already attested in Old Babylonian theophoric names.

== Astral epithets ==
Epithet	Meaning	Notes
Dilbat	"Venus"	Dilbat (dele-bad), the planet Venus, could function as a name of Ishtar, as attested for example in the Cuthean Legend of Naram-Sin.
DUMU ^{d}EN.ZU	"Daughter of Sin"	DUMU ^{d}EN.ZU is attested as an epithet of Inanna in the Sealand archive; according to Odette Boivin it highlights her astral role. The view that the moon god was her father was the dominant tradition regarding her parentage.
Gugkalla	"Precious carnelian"	Gugkalla (written ^{d}ZA.GUL-kal-la) occurs among the titles of Inanna in her astral aspect as Venus in the god list An = Anum (tablet I, line 179) and in its Old Babylonian forerunner.
Ḫud_{2}	"Morning"	Ḫud_{2} is attested as one of the epithets of Inanna in the earliest known cuneiform texts from Uruk, and it is presumed it confirms she was already associated with the planet Venus at this point in time.
Kakkabī	"Of the stars"	The epithet kakkabī is one of the few which consistently appear alongside the standard name of Ishtar, rather than in place of it.
Mulanadiri	"The ruling star of heaven"	Mulanadiri (or Mulanediri) is attested as an epithet of Inanna in the god list An = Anum (tablet IV, line 185).
Ninanna	"Lady of heaven"	The theonym Ninanna functioned as a title of Inanna as a divine representation of Venus. It should not be confused with a homophonous deity Ninan(na) known from lists of ancestors of Enlil.
Ninanšelaʾa	"Lady hanging in the sky"	Ninanšelaʾa is attested as an epithet of Inanna in a number of sources, including an inscription of Lugirizal and an offering list from Girsu from the Ur III period.
Ningalanna	"Great lady of heaven"	Ningalanna is attested as a name of Inanna as Venus in the god list An = Anum (tablet IV, line 171), with šarrat šamê, queen of heaven, given as the explanation in the second column
Ninsianna	"Red queen of heaven"	Ninsianna, the embodiment of Venus, could be understood as a manifestation of Inanna, though in Larsa they were worshiped separately as deities with different spheres of influence.
Rappu	"Clamp", "hoop"	Rappu is attested as an Akkadian name for both the planet Venus in the eighth month and for the corresponding goddess.
Sig	"Evening"	Sig is attested as one of the epithets of Inanna in the earliest known cuneiform texts from Uruk, and it is presumed it confirms she was already associated with the planet Venus at this point in time.
Šarrat-nipḫa		Šarrat-nipḫa was an epithet of Inanna in her astral role as Venus, possibly derived from the term nipḫu, referring to the rising or "lighting up" of this planet.
Šarrat-šamê	"Queen of heaven"	Šarrat-šamê was a title of Inanna as the evening star (Venus). She is mentioned in a Seleucid text from Uruk describing the akitu festival of Anu.
Timua Simua		Timua was one of the names used to refer to Inanna as an astral body, presumably Venus. According to Jeremiah Peterson, the variant spelling Simua might reflect a derivation from the phrase si-mu_{2}, "horn growing." Manfred Krebernik considers this to be a possible folk etymology. Timua also occurs as the name of a separate minor goddess in prayers from the Kassite period.
Uranna	"Horizon"	Uranna is attested as a byname of Inanna in a single god list.
Usan	"Evening"	Usan was one of the two epithets referring to Inanna as the evening star, the other being Timua. A number of names using this title as the theophoric element, such as Igi-Usan and Puzur-Usan, are attested in sources from the reign of the Akkadian Empire and the Third Dynasty of Ur.
Zib		Zib is attested as names of Inanna as the planet Venus in various god lists, for example An = Anum (tablet IV, line 175).

== Martial epithets ==
Epithet	Meaning	Notes
Agušaya	"The whirling dancer"	It is presumed that the epithet Agušaya is related to Akkadian terms gâšum, "to dance", and gūštum, "dance". It occurs in a complex poem from the Old Babylonian period, the Hymn of Agushaya. Comparing Inanna's warlike activities to dancing or to a game involving a jumping rope is widespread in cuneiform texts.
Annunitum	"The martial one" or "the skirmisher"	Annunitum was originally an epithet of Ishtar of Akkad. Early attestations are also available from Assur. At some point, this name came to refer to a distinct goddess, who was worshiped in Sippar-Amnanum. She and Ishtar had separate temples in this city. Annunitum could be depicted with a distinct attribute, a trident-like weapon.
Irnina	"Victory"	Irnina is attested as a manifestation of Ishtar believed to accompany Naram-Sin during his military campaigns.
Karašul	Unknown	Karašul is attested in an epithet of Inanna in various god lists and in Erimḫuš (tablet V, line 4), in one case glossed as ^{d}Iš-tar šá qar-ra-a-di, "Ishtar of the warrior".
Labbatu	"Lioness"	Labbatu is attested as an epithet of Inanna both in god lists and literary texts. No other Mesopotamian deities had epithets associating them with lions. A cognate epithet is already present in texts of Ebla, where Labutu (^{d}La-bu_{16}-du), a stand-in for Ishtar (Eblaite: ^{d}Aš-dar), occurs in association with Išḫara. The connection between Ishtar/Inanna and lions (poetically labbu) is well documented, and she is said to ride in a chariot drawn either by these animals or their fantastical counterparts in various literary compositions. It is presumed that they served as a metaphor of her character as a strong and courageous warrior. In An = Anu ša amēli, Labbatu is instead explained as "Ishtar of lamentation" (ša lal-la-ra-te). According to Ryan D. Witners this might be the result of reinterpreting it based on similarity to the verb labû, "to howl". In the Sultantepe god list, and likely also in An = Anum (tablet IV, line 256), a logographic spelling, ^{d}UR+UR (a ligature of two UR signs), is attested.
Ninintina	"Lady of warriorship"	The epithet Ninintina, attested in the Old Babylonian An = Anum forerunner and in An = Anum itself (tablet IV, line 23; glossed as bēlet qurdi) might be related to the myth about Inanna's conflict with the mountain god Ebiḫ (corresponding to Hamrin Mountains), whose name could be written as Enti.
Ninme	"Lady of battle"	Ninme (Akkadian: bēlet tāḫāzim) was a common epithet of Inanna, first attested in the times of Gudea, and later present for example in offering lists from Old Babylonian Larsa and Nippur and in the god list An = Anum (tablet IV, line 22). According to Tonia Sharlach, in one of the inscriptions of Amar-Sin "Inanna-Ninme" might stand in for Annunitum.
Ninragaba	"Lady horsewoman"	Ninraga is attested among the bynames of Inanna in the Old Babylonian forerunner to the god list An = Anum, and according to Antoine Cavigneaux and Manfred Krebernik can be restored in the same sequence in An = Anum itself (tablet IV, line 152).
Ninšenšena	"Lady of battle"	The epithet Ninšenšena referred to Inanna as a war goddess, and might be related to the toponym Šen-šen-na^{ki}, presumably a place in the proximity of Nippur. She was worshiped under this name in Nippur during the reign of Sin-Iqisham. Attestations are also known from the god list An = Anum (tablet IV, line 21, glossed as bēlet qabli), its Old Babylonian forerunner, and the Weider god list. In an inscription of Rim-Sîn I enumerating various deities worshiped in his kingdom, both Inanna and Ninšenšena are mentioned. A treaty between Muršili II and Tuppi-Teššup of Amurru mentions Ninšenšena of Kinza (Qadesh) among the divine witnesses, though the name has been interpreted as a logogram (NIN.PÌSAN.PÌSAN) in this case by Gary Beckman.
Ninuĝnima	"Lady of the army"	Ninuĝnima is explained as an epithet of Inanna in the god list An = Anum (tablet IV, line 20; glossed as bēlet ummānim); further attestations are known from the Weidner god list and an Old Babylonian document indicating that a temple dedicated to her existed in Nippur.

== Other epithets ==
Epithet	Meaning	Notes
Ama	"Mother", "female", "venerable woman"	The epithet ama is attested in a few cases as a title of Inanna, but according to Jeremy Black it should not be interpreted as a reference to motherhood in this context, as she was "not in any sense a mother goddess." According to Julia M. Asher-Greve, this epithet does not primarily indicate that a goddess is the mother of other deities, but instead should be understood as predominantly a metaphor for divine authority, particularly over cities and states. Joan Goodnick Westenholz similarly connected it to the protective roles of individual goddesses as city deities.
Bēlet-bīti	"Mistress of the temple"	Bēlet-bīti is listed among seven names presumably corresponding to manifestations of Inanna in the Archive of Mystic Heptads, and might correspond to the goddess Ištar-bīti known from texts from the Neo-Babylonian period.
Bēlet-dūri	"Lady of the city wall"	Bēlet-dūri (^{d}NIN-BÀD), first attested in sources from the Ur III period, for example in theophoric names, is explained as an epithet of Inanna in the god list An = Anum (tablet IV, line 39). It is also mentioned in passing in the text Crimes and Sacrileges of Nabu-šuma-iškun, where according to Steven W. Cole it might refer to the form of the goddess worshiped in Babylon as Bēlet-Eanna, though this conclusion is not certain. A temple dedicated to Bēlet-dūri might have existed in Neo-Babylonian Nippur, though this proposal relies on a single unprovenanced text, and no other references to a deity being worshiped under this title are known from this time. Bēlet-dūri is also present in late Bronze Age texts from Emar, and according to Gary Beckman this title can be understood as referring to a Mesopotamian deity in this context (as opposed to a Hurrian or local one). She is only attested there in the name of a city gate. The same epithet also occurs in texts from Nuzi as a title of a goddess worshiped in Ulamme, who according to Gernot Wilhelm can be identified as Ishtar. However, according to Marie-Claude Trémouille Ishtar's name might be a logographic representation of the Hurrian deity Šauška in the Nuzi corpus. The deity designated by the logogram Bēlet-dūri was associated with Tilla in Ulamme.
Bēlet-ZU.DI	Uncertain	Bēlet-ZU.DI, possibly to be read as Bēlet-ali^{ki}, "mistress of the city", occurs as a presumed manifestation of Inanna in the Archive of Mystic Heptads.
Bēltu	"Mistress"	Bēltu (^{d}GAŠAN) was frequently used to refer to Ishtar in various religious texts. It was a generic epithet which could be used instead of the proper name of any goddess.
Bēltiya	Hypocoristic form of Bēltu, "my mistress"	Bēltiya is presumed to be a combination of the epithet Bēltu and a hypocoristic suffix. It was chiefly an epithet of Zarpanit, and its infrequent application to the tutelary goddess of Uruk in texts from the seventh century BCE most likely reflects attempts at conflation advanced due to the political agenda of the city of Babylon.
Gula	"Great"	The epithet gula could be applied to many deities in the Ur III period, including Inanna, but also Ninhursag, Nisaba or Alla. It has been suggested that in the former two cases it referred to a possible healing aspect of the respective goddesses.
Innin	Uncertain	Innin is a common epithet of Inanna, less commonly attested as a title of Nanshe and Ezina as well. Its etymology is uncertain, with proposals including derivation from the Semitic root ‘nn, "to fight" or "to skirmish" (which the theonym Annunitum is also derived from), or survival of an archaic form of the theonym Inanna as a separate name. Jerrold S. Cooper tentatively suggests translating it as "virago" due to apparent aggressive connotations. Paul-Alain Beaulieu argues that in theophoric names and toponyms innin functions as if it was a variant of Inanna's name, and on this basis suggests it served as a designation of a distinct aspect of her.
Kur	"Mountain"	Inanna-kur is one of the earliest attested manifestations of this goddess, but she does not appear in administrative lists of offerings unlike the other three equally ancient forms. In addition to references in texts from the Uruk period, she is known from one of the Early Dynastic Zame Hymns, which mentions ku_{3} Inana-kur, "holy Inanna, the mountain peak". Joan Goodnick Westenholz noted that in this context it seems to specifically function as an epithet of Inanna of Zabalam.
Malūkatum	"(Having) far-reaching advice"	Malūkatum is listed as an epithet of Inanna in Nabnītu (tablet IV, line 203) alongside a Sumerian explanation, ^{d}Inanna-malga-sù.
Mašrê	"(Goddess) of wealth"	Mašrê, ^{d}Maš-ré-e, perhaps to be read as Ilat-mašrê, is attested only in a single copy of the Weidner god list from the Old Babylonian period between Ninigizibara and Ekurritum, and is presumed to be an epithet of Ishtar.
Mummu	"Creative power"	The epithet Mummu is applied to Ishtar in a šuila prayer in a passage comparing her to Ea, which follows similar passages analogously comparing her to Anu and Enlil. Elsewhere it occurs as a title of other deities, including Ea, Nabu, Marduk and Tiamat; in all of these cases it serves as an indication of a creative role. Additionally, a distinct deity named Mummu appears in the Enūma Eliš as a servant of Apsu.
Nanaya	Hypocoristic form of Inanna (disputed)	It has been proposed that the name of the goddess Nanaya was in origin a hypocoristic form of Inanna's, but this view is not universally accepted, and it is generally assumed the name has no obvious Sumerian or Akkadian etymology. There is nonetheless evidence that she was sometimes understood as a form of Inanna rather than as a separate goddess.
Ninarazu		Ninarazu, assumed to be an epithet of Ishtar, is attested in An = Anum (tablet IV, line 43) and its forerunner, as well as in the god list from Mari. A similarly named figure, nin-arazu-giš-tuku, "lady who listens to prayers", appears as an adversary of the demon Lamashtu in an incantation. The epithet Ninarazu is not to be confused with the unrelated deity Arazu.
Ninegal Bēlet-ekalli	"Lady of the palace"	Ninegal, the name of a distinct minor goddess associated with royal palaces, could also function as an epithet of Inanna and other goddesses. It is well attested with literary compositions focused on Inanna, especially in love poetry about her and Dumuzi, and in some cases parallelism between the use of the primary name and the epithet has been observed.
Ningubarra	"Lady with loose hair"	Ningubarra is listed among titles of Inanna in the god list An = Anum (tablet IV, line 33) though this theonym might have originally been related to Gubarra, a goddess associated with the steppe who could be linked to Amurru's wife Ašratum.
Ningula	"Great lady"	The epithet Ningula is attested in the section of the god list An = Anum dedicated to Inanna (tablet IV, line 41).
Ninigigun	"Lady with colorful eyes"	Ninigigun (or various related variant spellings) is attested as an epithet of Inanna in various god lists. Based on an Akkadian explanation, igi-gùn = burmi ēni (restoration not entirely certain), it is presumed that this title was related to the descriptions of the goddess' colorful eyes known from literary texts.
Nin-KA-imin	"Lady with seven voices/mouths"	The epithet Nin-KA-imin (reading of the second sign uncertain) occurs in the god list An = Anum (tablet IV, line 28).
Nin-KA-limmu	"Lady with four voices/mouths"	The epithet Nin-KA-limmu (reading of the second sign uncertain) occurs in the god list An = Anum (tablet IV, line 29).
Ninkisalgura	"Lady of the cult niche(s)"	The epithet Ninkisalgura occurs in a single document with the Akkadian gloss bēlet ibrati.
Ninkurkurra	"Lady of the lands"	The epithet Ninkurkurra is present in inscriptions of Marduk-apla-iddina II and Sargon II from Uruk.
Ninmesharra	"Lady of countless me"	Due to functioning as an epithet of Inanna, Ninmesharra is attested as the title of a composition focused on her attributed to Enheduanna. In other contexts the same theonym also occurs as an epithet of Ninlil, and as the name of a distinct goddess paired with the primordial deity Enmesharra in enumerations of ancestors of Enlil.
Nin-UM	Unknown	Nin-UM is a possible byname of Inanna attested in the Early Dynastic Zame Hymns. Joan Goodnick Westenholz tentatively suggested that it might have been the original name of the goddess who eventually came to be known as Inanna of Zabalam. She argues that she was originally a distinct figure, and only came to be absorbed by Inanna, though she assumes this process occurred before the beginning of recorded history.
Nin-URU-mun-DU	"Lady brought the city water"	Nin-URU-mun-DU (reading of the second and last signs uncertain), attested as one of the bynames of Inanna in the god list An = Anum (tablet IV, line 34), might be derived from the theonym Ninuruamu-DU known from Early Dynastic texts from the state of Lagash. The latter is attested in a single theophoric name, Ur-Ninuruamu-DU, and in a text mentioning gala clergy in the service of various deities.
Nin-URU-kiĝara	"Lady who founded the city"	Nin-URU-kiĝara (reading of the second sign uncertain) occurs as an epithet of Inanna in the god list An = Anum (tablet IV, line 32), where it is listed after Nin-Aratta.
Nugig	Uncertain	The meaning of the word nugig, which was commonly used as an epithet of Inanna, is a matter of dispute among researchers. Proposals include "one who is taboo," "sacrosanct," "hierodule" and "priestess." Anette Zgoll notes that many passages in which it occurs are focused on highlighting Inanna's power, for example as a source of royal authority during the enthronement of a ruler.
NUN	"Princely"	NUN is attested as one of the three epithets of Inanna in the earliest known cuneiform texts from Uruk, but it no longer appears in later periods.
Pārisat-palê	Uncertain	Pārisat-palê (reading and meaning uncertain, possibly "she who determines the length of a reign") was a manifestation of Assyrian Ishtar of Nineveh worshiped in this city and in Assur.
Qibi-dunqi	"Say my blessing"	Qibi-dunqi is attested as a form of Ishtar in a late Babylonian hymn, though the name could also designate a separate deity, possibly analogous to Iqbi-damiq.
Sutītu	"The Sutean"	Sutītu is attested as an epithet of Inanna in the god list An = Anum (tablet IV, line 131). According to Joan Goodnick Westenholz, in the first millennium BCE the name referred to a new goddess who functioned as a personification of the Suteans. Clergy of Sutītu appears in documents from Borsippa from the reign of Nabu-shuma-ishkun.
Šarratum	"Queen"	Šarratum is attested as the name of a manifestation of Inanna in a text from Tell Haddad.
Šen-nu-imina		Šen-nu-imina occurs as an epithet of Inanna in the god list An = Anu ša amēli, which explains it in Akkadian as ša bunnannê, possibly "of the (beautiful) shape".
Šiduri	"She is my protection" or "young woman"	Šiduri is attested as a title of Inanna/Ishtar in the Hymn to the Queen of Nippur. According to Šurpu, under this name she was associated with wisdom. However, the character from the Epic of Gilgamesh bearing the same name is agreed to not be Ishtar. Two possible explanations of the name have been proposed, Akkadian šī-dūrī, "she is my protection," or a Hurrian loanword, šiduri, "young woman." Andrew R. George notes that it is possible that the former served as a folk etymology of the latter in Mesopotamia.
Telītu	"The skilled one", "the capable one"	Telītu commonly occurs as an epithet of Inanna in cuneiform texts. In the first millennium BCE, it also came to function as the name of a separate goddess. As an independent deity, she occurs in an Emesal list of deities, in the Sultantepe god list and in late copies in the Weidner god list, though in the last case her inclusion appears to be the result of textual corruption. A shrine dedicated to her existed in Babylon. The traditional explanation of the name, based on similarity to Akkadian le’ûm, "to be able," has been called into question by Wilfred G. Lambert, who argued that "wisdom or skill is not any particular attribute" of the goddess it was applied to; according to Manfred Krebernik, it might instead be related to Inanna's astral role or to the other meaning of the word, which apparently could be a synonym of the terms lukur and nadītu as well. In one case, Telītu is given as the explanation of Zib, one of the astral bynames of Inanna pertaining to her role as personification of Venus.
Tibanimma	"Rise up towards me!" or "Come ye hither!"	Tibanimma is explained in An = Anu ša amēli as "Ishtar of handcuffs" (ša IṢ-qa-a-te). According to Ryan D. Winters, this title likely has sexual connotations.
Ulsigga	Uncertain	Ulsigga is attested as an epithet of Inanna in various god lists, including An = Anum (tablet IV, line 3). Under this name, she was worshiped in Dunnu-ṣā’idi near Babylon in the temple Eḫili-Ištar ("house, bliss of Ishtar"), based on whose name Manfred Krebernik suggests the sign ul in this name is to be interpreted as ulṣu, "joy". Ryan D. Winters argues it can be translated as "alluring" or "beauty". However, there is also evidence for interpreting it as a derivative of ul_{4} or ul_{5}, "firmament".
Zanaru Zannāru	Disputed	The epithet Zanaru, known chiefly from lexical lists, is commonly connected to the instrument zannaru, possibly analogous to kinnaru/kinnor. However, according to Wilfred G. Lambert, the fact that it was typically written with a single n, while the name of the instrument with two, casts doubt over this assumption. He instead suggested derivation from the Elamite title za-na, "lady", which is also attested as a theonym, ^{d}Za-na. In the god list An = Anu ša amēli, Zanaru is explained as Ishtar ša mātāte, "of the lands." The reasons behind this are unclear. In the Hymn to the Queen of Nippur, Zanaru is described with the epithet Telītu.

=== Epithets from the Nuzi texts ===
A deity designated by the logogram ^{d}IŠTAR is described with various epithets, either linguistically Hurrian or "Hurrianised", in texts from Nuzi. Gernot Wilhelm renders the logogram phonetically as Ishtar, but according to Marie-Claude Trémouille, the deity meant might be Šauška, who was considered to be her counterpart both in Mesopotamian and Hurrian sources. Volkert Haas used the name "Ištar-Ša(w)oška" to refer to the deity or deities designated by these epithets.

Epithet	Linguistic affinity	Notes
Allaiwašwe	Hurrian or Hurrianised	^{d}IŠTAR allaiwašwe (meaning uncertain) was worshiped in Ulamme.
Ḫumella	Hurrian or Hurrianised	Ḫumella or ^{d}IŠTAR ḫumella was worshiped alongside Nergal in Ulamme. The pair is also attested in association with other cities in the kingdom of Arrapḫa, and the relation between them has been compared to the connection between the Ninevite Šauška and Teshub. Volkert Haas following an earlier study of Ilse Wegner suggested Ḫumella might have been a form of ^{d}IŠTAR associated with the underworld.
Putaḫḫe	Hurrian	^{d}IŠTAR putaḫḫe was worshiped alongside ^{d}IŠTAR bēlat dūri in Ulamme. The epithet might be derived from the Hurrian root pud-, "to create" or "to beget".
Tupkilḫe Akkupawe?	Hurrian or Hurrianised	^{d}IŠTAR tupkilḫe was worshiped in the city of Apenaš, and might be identical with ^{d}IŠTAR akkupawe known from similar sources.
