= Ḫišamītum =

Mesopotamian goddess

- Tutelary goddess of Ḫišamta
- Major cult center: Ḫišamta, Mari

Ḫišamītum or Ḫišametum was a Mesopotamian goddess worshiped in the kingdom of Mari. She was the tutelary deity of the city of Ḫišamta, and it is presumed she originated as a hypostasis of Ishtar. Sacrifices to her are mentioned in various administrative documents from the reigns of kings such as Yaḫdun-Lim and Zimri-Lim. She is also known from letters and a compendium of divination.

== Name and origin ==
Ḫišamītum's name can be translated as "Lady of Ḫišamta." In a single offering list her name is spelled ^{d}NIN.E-sá-mì-tum, formerly erroneously read as ^{d}Nin-e-di-lá-tum. The construction ^{d}NIN used in early Mariote texts is now recognized as a double determinative used by local scribes to designate a name as belonging to a female deity.

It is presumed Ḫišamītum she was a local hypostasis of Ishtar in origin. She was the tutelary goddess of the city of Ḫišamta, which was located south of Terqa. Hypostases of Ishtar whose names are geographic designations were common, and other examples from Mari include Dērītum and Kišītum.

== Worship ==
Ḫišamītum was worshiped in Ḫišamta, where a temple dedicated to her was located. A further center of her cult was Mari, as indicated by texts pertaining to Zimri-Lim's veneration of this goddess. A shrine dedicated to her is mentioned in various documents, but it is not certain if it was located in Mari's "sacred compound" or in the royal palace. A gate in Terqa named after her is mentioned in a letter from the official Yasim-sumu to Zimri-Lim discussing the arrival of Elamites in the city.

In a list of offerings from the reign of Yaḫdun-Lim, Ḫišamītum occurs after Shamash (the sun god) and before Ḫibirtum (a deity associated with grazing), in a list from a celebration following the enthronement of Zimri-Lim after Kiššītum ("Lady of Kish") and before Mārat-altim ("daughter of the goddess"), while in a document dealing with the cults of Terqa from the reign of the latter monarch - between Nergal and Dērītum. One document lists her among the deities honored with a liptum, possibly to be understood as the act of consecration of a sacrificial animal. It is also attested for deities such as Adad, Dagan, Annunitum and Taški-Mamma. Sacrifice of lambs to her is mentioned in a number of texts originating in the so-called "archive of Asqudum," a collection of administrative texts.

It is known that king Zimri-Lim at one point has traveled to Ḫišamta to make offerings to Ḫišamītum and other deities commonly worshiped in the proximity of Terqa, possibly in order to secure the support of local inhabitants. A reference to his wife Shibtu traveling there alongside the icon of Ḫišamītum is known too.

Ḫišamītum appears in a single masculine theophoric name.

== Miscellaneous attestations ==
In one of her letters Addu-duri, the mother of Zimri-Lim, relayed a message issued by Ḫišamītum to him. Apparently the goddess, speaking through a member of the staff of her "house" (temple), a certain Iṣi-Ahu, declared that she trampled the king's enemies:

After you (left) they were eating your food [and] drinking from your cup, your antagonists keep bringing out ungood [and] evil things about you. I trample them underfoot [...]

In an Old Babylonian divination compendium, Ḫišamītum (^{d}E-ša-mi-tim) appears alongside Išḫara, and the omen corresponding to them is a red spot below the right armpit. It has been noted that they appear in a grouping of deities who originate in western Mesopotamia.
