= Kitītum =

Mesopotamian goddess

- Tutelary goddess of Kiti
- Major cult center: Tell Ishchali (Kiti, later Nērebtum)

Kitītum was a Mesopotamian goddess closely associated with Tell Ishchali. Her name was derived from the oldest known name of this site, Kiti. It is assumed she originated as a local form of Inanna, as indicated by the designation "Inanna of Kiti" known from texts from Eshnunna, though it has also been argued that her character was influenced by the Hurrian deity Šauška. A temple dedicated to her has been discovered during the excavations of Tell Ishchali. It is one of the largest Old Babylonian temples known, but remained in use for only 150 years. It was most likely destroyed in 1762 BCE, during the war between Ibal-pi-el II of Eshnunna and Hammurabi of Babylon.

== Name and character ==
The theonym Kitītum was spelled as ^{d}ki-ti-tum in cuneiform. It was derived from the toponym Kiti. While texts from Tell Ishchali refer to the goddess as Kitītum, these discovered in Tell Asmar (Eshnunna) instead call her "Inanna of Kiti", ^{d}INANNA ki-ti. However, the temple administrators (šangû) associated with her were always addressed as servants of Kitītum, not Inanna of Kiti.

Similarly as in the cases of deities such as Arbilītum, Kišītum, Ḫišamītum, Ulmašītum and others, it is presumed that Kitītum was a local form of Inanna (Ishtar) who nonetheless functioned as a distinct deity. However, Beate Pongratz-Leisten suggests that her character might have been patterned on Hurrian Šauška of Nineveh, as she was regarded as capable of issuing oracles, which in the second millennium BCE was a role more commonly attributed to Syro-Anatolian rather than Lower Mesopotamian deities. (Note: Urkitum (Inanna of Uruk) is characterized as an oracular deity in Neo-Assyrian texts, but this is likely a late development and according to Pongratz-Leisten it is implausible the notion of any form of Inanna fulfilling such a role developed in Uruk.)

== Worship ==
=== Overview ===
Kitītum was closely associated with Tell Ishchali. In the Bronze Age this site was known as Kiti, though at some point the name was changed to Nērebtum (from Akkadian nērebum, "entrance" or "pass"). It is possible that it is already mentioned under its older name in one of the Zame Hymns. These texts were discovered in Abu Salabikh and date to the Early Dynastic period IIIa. The toponym BU+BU.KALAM has been tentatively identified as an early form of the name of this city based on explanations in later geographical texts. However, the corresponding deity in the Zame Hymns is not Kitītum, but rather Amgalnuna ("princely wild bull"), a minor god otherwise known from the Abu Salabikh god list, but absent from contemporary sources from Fara and from any texts postdating the Early Dynastic period. Manfred Krebernik and Jan Lisman propose that he was at some point replaced as the city deity of Kiti by Inanna. However, Olga Drewnowska suggests that the tutelary god of this city was Sin (specifically in his aspect as a divine guardian of oaths, Sîn ša kamānim), and Kitītum only came to be recognized in this role after it was dedicated to her by Ipiq-Adad II of Eshnunna in the twenty ninth year of his reign. Nathan Wasserman and Ygal Bloch instead consider the evidence pertaining to Kitītum from the reign of this king as an indication that her cult had a royal character comparable to that of Tishpak.

Evidence for the worship of Kitītum is largely limited to sources from Tell Ishschali, though references to oil offerings and to fashioning an unidentified object for her are also known from texts from Eshnunna, chiefly from the reign of Bilalama.

=== Temple ===
A temple dedicated to Kitītum existed in Tell Ishchali. The complex centered on it also included a sanctuary of Ninshubur. She functioned as a divine vizier of its main goddess.

The temple was originally constructed in the second half of the Isin-Larsa period. It measures 75 x 110 meters, and is the single largest building discovered during the excavations of the site, as well as one of the largest Old Babylonian temples presently known overall. It is not known which ruler originally ordered its construction. The second phase of building occurred during the reign of Ipiq-Adad II of Eshnunna (reigned c. 1862-1816 BCE), at a time when his kingdom started to gain influence across Mesopotamia due to decline of Isin and Larsa. The youngest layer dates to the reign of Ibal-pi-el II. He commissioned another rebuilding of the temple. It was ultimately destroyed in a fire, possibly during the military conflict between Ibal-pi-el II and Hammurabi of Babylon. This event has been dated to 1762 BCE, with the structure ultimately being in use for around 150 years from original construction to destruction. Such a short period of occupation is considered unusual for a Mesopotamian temple.

A number of votive objects have been identified during the excavations of the temple of Kitītum. They include cylinder seals, stamp seals, figures, pendants, beads, mace heads and more. Most of them are not inscribed, with the exception of Ipiq-Adad II's bricks with an inscription dedicating the entire city to Kitītum and a seal which belonged to a woman named Mattatum. The identification of the deity the temple was dedicated to as Kitītum was originally made based on the discovery of the latter.

Some of the other seals discovered in the temple of Kitītum do not reflect artistic conventions of the early second millennium BCE, and instead originate in the Early Dynastic and Old Akkadian periods. Additionally, a figure which resembles early Bronze Age objects from Anatolia and the Cyclades has been discovered at the site, and is presumed to be a further example of an earlier object placed in the temple. Based on these discoveries Peter Calmeyer labeled the temple as the oldest known museum. Elisa Roßberger considers this label to be inaccurate. However, she also assumes that the antiquity of the objects deposited in the temple imbued them with additional importance in the eyes of the devotees. She states that based an archeological evidence it can be assumed that unusual objects were viewed as particularly suitable offerings for Kitītum, as in addition to works of arts from the third millennium BCE, evidence for the offering of commodities from distant areas, such as sea shells and ostrich eggs, is also available.

=== Clergy ===
Evidence for clergy is scarce in sources from Tell Ishchali overall. However, it is known that a chief temple administrator (šangû) of Kitītum resided in the city, with three holders of this office known by name. In contrast with contemporary Sippar, there is no evidence that more than one person fulfilled this role at a time. Igmil-Sin acted as the šangû during the reign of Naram-Sin of Eshnunna; he was succeeded by his two sons, first Inbusha, who was active during the reigns of Dadusha, Dannum-taḫaz and up to the fifth year of Ibal-pi-El II, and afterwards by Abizum.

The šangû was responsible for maintaining the archive of the temple. Texts belonging to it discovered during excavations include lists of objects offered to Kitītum, loan records, receipts for received tools and materials, other miscellaneous administrative, legal and school texts, as well as letters. Furthermore, two of the texts are records of oracles issued by Kitītum directed to king Ibal-pi-el II, written in the form of letters. In both of them the goddess promises him her protection and predicts his reign will be prosperous. It is not known how the oracles were delivered, as neither text mentions any human involvement, though based on the vocabulary used it is likely that they were based on the interpretation of omens by a diviner.

In addition to their involvement in the cult of Kitītum, the šangû for unknown reasons additionally lent property belonging to Sin of Agaga, a nearby town.

Other attested members of the staff of the temple of Kitītum included a single kalû, a number of female singers, ecstatics and both permanent and seasonal workers. Additionally, a reference to a šā’iltu priestess in the service of Kitītum, a certain Nuṭṭuptum, has been identified in a single text.

=== Miscellaneous attestations ===
In a single loan document from Tell Ishschali, Kitītum occurs as a divine witness. The other deities mentioned alongside her are Shamash, Aya and Išarkidiššu. (Note: While the last of these theonyms is structured like an Old Akkadian given name, it occurs as the name of a deity in other Old Babylonian sources (including a text from Lagaba from the reign of Samsu-iluna and a seal inscription) and as a title of Nergal in later god lists (An = Anum tablet VI, line 6 and a double column edition of the Weidner god list). According to Olga Drewnowska, Išarkidiššu might have been regarded as the husband of Kitītum in Tell Ishschali, though the evidence is inconclusive.)

Only two theophoric names invoking Kitītum have been identified in texts from Tell Ishschali, Puzur-Kitītum and Kitītum-ummi. A further example has been identified in a text from Old Babylonian Sippar, which mentions a female slave hailing from Uruk named Kitītum-ḫazirat. Nathan Wasserman and Ygal Bloch additionally suggest that the name of king Dadusha, which can be literally translated as "her beloved", implicitly refers to Kitītum due to the involvement of the royal family of Eshnunna in the worship of this goddess.
