= Annunitum =

Mesopotamian goddess

- Goddess of war
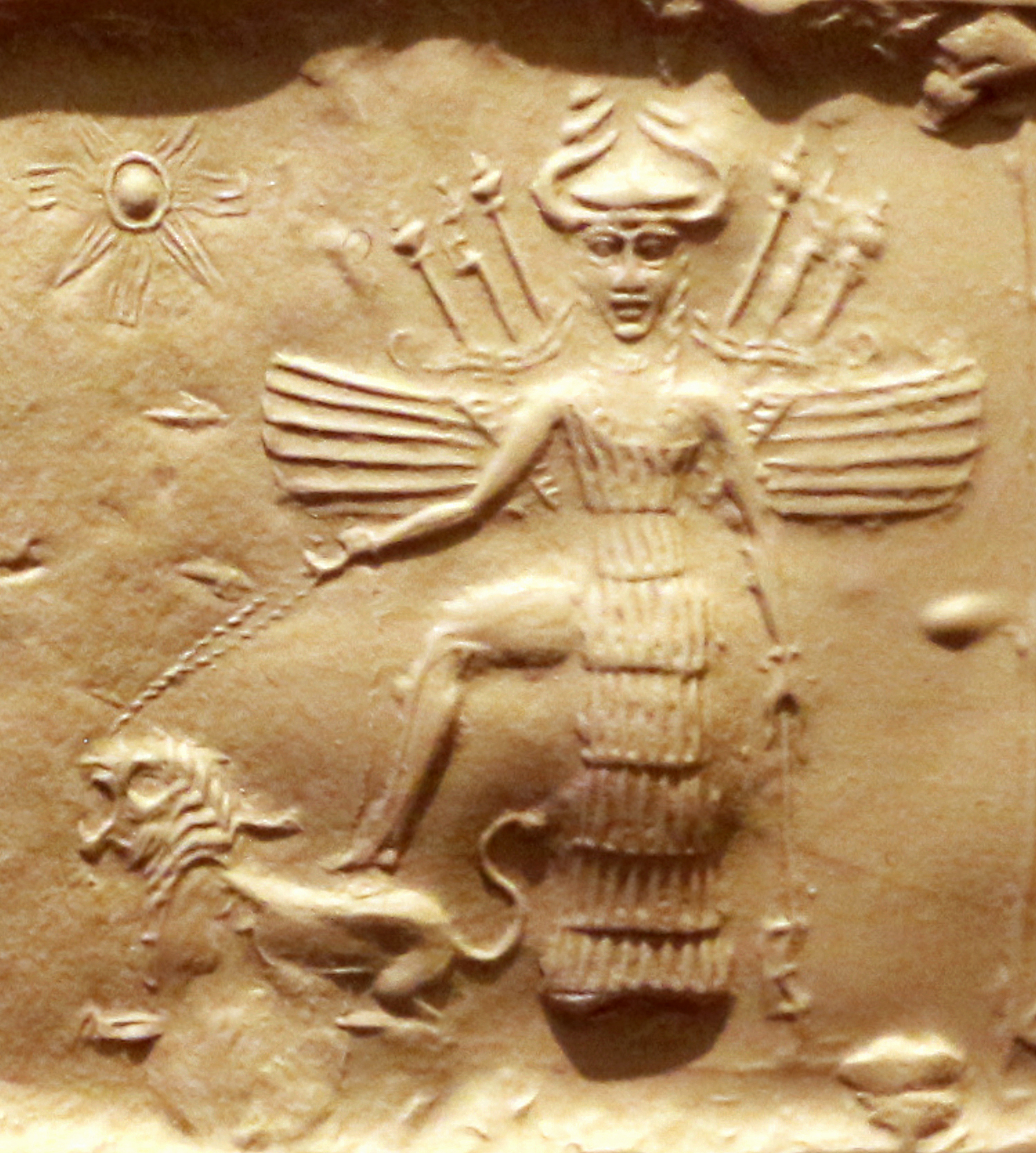
- A depiction of Ishtar as an armed warrior on an Akkadian seal, 2350–2150 BCE. The warlike aspect of Ishtar, "Ishtar Annunitum," developed into a separate goddess in the late third millennium BCE.
- Major cult center: Akkad, Sippar-Amnanum

Annunitum (𒀭𒉡𒉌𒌈; also romanized as Anunītu) was a Mesopotamian goddess associated with warfare. She was initially an epithet of Ishtar of Akkad exemplifying her warlike aspect, but by the late third millennium BCE she came to function as a distinct deity. She was the tutelary goddess of the cities of Akkad and Sippar-Amnanum, though she was also worshiped elsewhere in Mesopotamia.

== Name ==
As attested in cuneiform texts from the Old Akkadian period onward, Annunitum's name was typically written as an-nu-ni-tum. Starting with the Old Babylonian period it was prefaced with the "divine determinative" (dingir). While an-nu-ni-tum remained the most common spelling in the Kassite period as well, in sources from the first millennium BCE a-nu-ni-tum, already known from a single Old Babylonian text and from a late Kassite inscription of king Meli-Shipak, became standard. An Old Babylonian prayer (CBS 19842) additionally preserves the shortened form a-nu-na, romanized by Wilfred G. Lambert as Anūna. There is no certainty whether the original pronunciation is better reflected by romanization with a single or double n.

It is presumed that Annunitum's name is derived from the root ‘nn, "warlike". It can be translated as "skirmisher" or "the martial one". Etymological connections with phonetically similar theonyms Anu, Antu and Anunna have been ruled out.

== Origin ==
Annunitum was originally an epithet of Ishtar as the tutelary goddess of the city of Akkad. However, later it came to be viewed as a theonym, rather than an epithet, and developed into a distinct deity. It is assumed the process of separation of Annunitum from Ishtar started during the reign of Shar-Kali-Sharri (c. 2175-2150 BCE), though it is possible a passage from the reign of Naram-Sin (c. 2284–2275 BCE) already refers to them as a pair of distinct goddesses as opposed to a singular Ishtar-Annunitum. By the end of the third millennium BCE, Annunitum was widely recognized as a separate goddess. In the Ur III period, she was worshiped separately from Ishtar in Nippur, Ur and Uruk, and by the Old Babylonian period both of them had separate temples in Sippar, respectively the E-ulmaš and E-edina.

Spencer J. Allen refers to the phenomenon of epithets of Mesopotamian deities becoming distinct figures as "divine splintering". Other comparable cases of an epithet of Ishtar becoming a distinct deity include Dīrītu, Urkayītu and Arbilītu. Tonia Sharlach in her study of Annunitum and other goddesses worshiped in the court of Shulgi notes that it might be more accurate to refer to the names Ishtar and Inanna as "something of an umbrella term" designating multiple interconnected deities. For example, a collection of hymns from the Ur III period treats Inanna of Uruk, Inanna of Zabalam and Inanna of Ulmaš (Ishtar of Akkad) as three separate deities, with separate compositions dedicated to each of them. Sharlach suggests that to accommodate this information, the study of "forms" of Ishtar in Mesopotamian sources requires relying on a methodology developed by Gary Beckman for the purpose of study of deities designated by the logogram ^{d}IŠTAR in Hittite texts, such as the Hurrian Šauška. As summarized by Beckman, "in some respects (...) Ištar-figures partake of a common essence, while in others they are distinct". He also notes that "any special features of the varieties will become apparent only if each is initially studied in isolation".

== Character and iconography ==
Annunitum was regarded as a warlike goddess. She could be addressed as the lady of battle. She originally exemplified the martial side of Ishtar. An inscription of Nabonidus describes her as armed with a bow and arrows. An earlier cylinder seal from Sippar assumed to depict her in the company of another goddess, likely Aya, shows her holding a trident-like weapon. Another possible depiction of Annunitum on a cylinder seal shows her standing on the back of two addorsed lion-griffons. Other seals from Sippar indicate she could be depicted in a robe leaving one shoulder and breast exposed, similarly to Ishtar and Aya. It is assumed that this garment was meant to highlight beauty, charm and sex appeal.

A constellation referred to with Annunitum's name corresponded to the eastern part of Pisces.

In Mesopotamian astronomy Annunitum's name was used to refer to a constellation corresponding to part of Pisces, specifically the eastern fish. An ikribu prayer dedicated to her in this role is known. However, she was usually not described as an astral deity, in contrast with Ishtar.

A curse formula on a kudurru from the Kassite period indicates that Annunitum was among the deities regarded as capable of inflicting oath-breakers with leprosy, a role shared with deities such as Sin, Shamash, Ishtar, Anu and Enlil.

== Associations with other deities ==
Annunitum could be regarded as a daughter of Sin, though references to this association are entirely limited to Nabonidus' inscriptions. It is presumed that this tradition is an extension of presenting Sin as the father of Ishtar. A unique passage from Nabonidus' Eḫulḫul cylinder simultaneously referring to Enlil and Sin as Annunitum's fathers is presumed to reflect the so-called "theology of the moon", an idea attested in Neo-Assyrian in Neo-Babylonian texts according to which Sin possessed the powers of Enlil, Anu and Ea while the moon was waxing. In this context, Enlil was redefined as a designation of the gibbous moon.

When regarded as distinct from Ishtar, Annunitum could be regarded as a member of her entourage, as already attested in the Ur III period.

Annunitum was closely associated with Ulmašītum, another martial hypostasis of Ishtar, originally associated with the temple E-ulmaš in Akkad. Spencer J. Allen assumes the connection between them originally developed in this location. Tonia Sharlach notes that while distinct from each other, they appear in sources from the Ur III period together frequently and compares them to a pair of twins. She also points out in the archive of Shulgi-simti they effectively form a quartet with Belet-Šuḫnir and Belet-Terraban.

Wolfgang Heimpel proposes that in Old Babylonian Mari Annunitum was closely associated with Belet Ekallim, possibly due to their shared connection with Ishtar. Additionally, a text from this city refers to a belief that after his annual resurrection Dumuzi entered the temple of Annunitum, though it has been noted he was only occasionally associated with any deities belonging to the Mariote pantheon.

A fragmentary omen list refers to Eturammi as the messenger of Annunitum (SUKKAL ^{d}a-nu-ni-tum). This name is also attested in the god list An = Anum (tablet V, line 185), though there this deity is assigned a similar role in association with Birtum instead.

== Worship ==
=== Akkad ===
In the Old Akkadian period Ishtar-Annunitum was considered the tutelary goddess of the city of Akkad, and it has been described as the main cult center of Annunitum as a distinct deity as well. A temple dedicated to her existed in this city, but its full ceremonial name is not known. It is mentioned in the Khorsbad temple list, which is known from only one exemplar and focused on houses of worship located in the north of Mesopotamia, including the Diyala basin and Transtigridian regions. Annunitum was adopted as a personal deity by Naram-Sin of Akkad, and apparently after his deification he was considered to be married to her.

By the Ur III period Akkad ceased to be considered an important city, but Annunitum's cult spread across Mesopotamia. Through the Old Babylonian period she remained one of the goddesses most commonly invoked in personal letters, and appears in them with comparable frequency to Aya, Gula, Ninsianna and Zarpanitum, though less commonly than Ishtar. She continued to be worshiped across Mesopotamia up to the Neo-Babylonian period.

=== Sippar ===
==== Old Babylonian period ====
Annunitum was considered an important deity in Sippar. As already attested in the Old Babylonian period, she could be referred to with the epithet Šarrat-Sipparim, :queen of Sippar", though it was also applied to Ishtar. (Note: Additionally, in the Neo-Babylonian period it came to function as the proper name of a new deity distinct from both of them.) She was the tutelary goddess of Sippar-Amnanum, modern Tell ed-Der, located next to ancient Sippar-Yahrurum, modern Abu Habbah, which in antiquity was a cult center of Shamash and Aya. She was worshiped in a temple beating the ceremonial name E-ulmaš, similarly as the temple of Ishtar in Akkad. Its meaning remains unknown; Paul-Alain Beaulieu notes that while It has been proposed that this might reflect a situation in which a major deity was superimposed over a preexisting one whose name was only preserved in the name of the temple, this theory lacks evidence other than the presence of names with phrases like Ulmaš seemingly functioning as a theophoric element, which can be explained as the temple name itself being regarded as divine, rather than as proof of the existence of otherwise unattested deity Ulmaš. The temple has not been excavated yet, and its full history remains uncertain.

Tonia Sharlach speculatively suggests Sippar already became Annunitum's main cult center in the Ur III period. Jennie Myers suggests that Annunitum might have become its tutelary goddess during the reign of the Sargonic dynasty based on the name of her temple. However, she acknowledges that there is no evidence for the existence of this house of worship before the Old Babylonian period and that the oldest reference to Annunitum being worshiped in Sippar is a text from the reign of Sabium. Alexa Bartelmus and Jon Taylor stress there is no unambiguous evidence for the existence of Sippar-Amnanum before the Ur III period, and that later rulers like Nabonidus do not claim the temple of Annunitum was founded during the Old Akkadian period, which makes the early dating implausible.

The worship of Annunitum in the Old Babylonian is well documented in the archive of Ur-Utu who served as her chief lamentation priest (kalamāḫu). She is one of the only three goddesses attested as divine witnesses in legal texts from Sippar, the other two being Aya and Mamu. A street, a gate and a canal named after her existed in Sippar-Amnanum. The number of theophoric names invoking her increased after the reign of Hammurabi, rising from 1% in early Old Babylonian sources to over 6%.

After the reign of Ammi-Saduqa Sippar-Amnanum was destroyed in a fire and remained uninhabited for around 200 years. The cult of Annunitum was most likely transferred to Sippar-Yahrurum as a result.

==== Kassite period ====
The Kassite kings Shagarakti-Shuriash and Kurigalzu I according to commemorative inscriptions repaired the E-maš of Annunitum in Sippar-Annunītu. The toponym might be either an alternate name of Sippar-Amnanum, or alternatively the part of the city where the temple was located. It is uncertain if the E-maš was an alternate name of the E-ulmaš, the name of a shrine within it, or a different house of worship. Bartelmus and Taylor suggest that the small number of references to it makes the first possibility the most plausible.

No exemplars of the aforementioned inscriptions dealing with the reconstruction of Annunitum's temple dated to the Kassite period have been discovered, but like many other royal inscriptions they were copied in the Neo-Babylonian period and survive in the form of a compilation. Most likely scribes worked with a cache of foundation deposits of both kings. The inscription of Shagarakti-Shuriash refers to him as "the shepherd, favorite of Šamaš and beloved of Annunītum" (sipa še-ga ^{d}UTU-ke ki-áĝ an-nu-ni-tu_{4}), which likely influenced Nabonidus' description of him as "the favorite of Shamash and Annunitum" (mi-gi-ir ^{d}UTU u ^{d}a-nu-ni-tu_{4}).

==== Late attestations ====
Texts from the reign of Tiglath-pileser I indicate Annunitum remained a major goddess in the local pantheon through the twelfth century, but at an unknown point in time her position started to decline. According to an inscription of Nabonidus, the E-ulmaš was eventually destroyed by Sennacherib. No other sources refer to this event, but it is presumed that the account reflects historical reality. Nabonidus additionally asserts that Annunitum was subsequently transferred to Arrapḫa and that her cult was disturbed by Gutians, though in this context the term should be understood as a generic reference to barbarians or enemies of Babylonia.

During the Neo-Babylonian period, Nabopolassar and Nebuchadnezzar II made offerings to Annunitum and other displaced deities in a structure located near or within the E-babbar. In offering lists from the reign of Nabopolassar she is the last of the deities mentioned, but her position improved during the reign of Nebuchadnezzar II. According to Nabonidus' inscriptions she was subsequently returned to Sippar-Amnanum by Neriglissar, who renovated her statue.

Nabonidus elevated Annunitum's position in the pantheon of Sippar. It is assumed that he considered her one of the most important deities next to Sin, Shamash and Ishtar. He rebuilt the E-ulmaš in the sixteenth year of his reign. According to one of his inscriptions, he was instructed to do so by Annunitum in a dream. He also states that when the work started, inscriptions of Shagarakti-Shuriash were discovered, and the rebuilding followed guidance found in them. During his reign Annunitum was also the only deity for whom a separate clothing ceremony (lubuštu) was held; such celebrations are otherwise only attested for Shamash alongside gods of Sippar as a collective. However, her elevation under Nabonidus had no impact on her popularity in theophoric names, with only two examples attested in texts from his reign.

Sources from the Achaemenid period indicate that Annunitum retained her position in offering lists established during the reign of Nebuchadnezzar II. During the reigns of Cyrus and Darius she received offerings referred to as maḫḫuru, which consisted of sheep, barley or dates. The E-ulmaš is still mentioned in an administrative text dated to the reign of the latter ruler.

=== Mari ===
Annunitum is first attested in Mari in the Ur III period, though her importance in the local pantheon only grew in the Old Babylonian period. During the reign of Zimri-Lim she was one of the nine deities who received the most offerings during festivals, next to the local god Itūr-Mēr, Dagan, Belet Ekallim, Nergal, Shamash, Ea, Ninhursag and Addu. She is listed after Dīrītum and before Ḫubur as a recipient of six sheep in a text documenting offerings made after Zimri-Lim's ascension, and between Mārat-iltim and Bēlet-biri in another similar source focused on sacrifices to the deities of Terqa. One of the earliest year names of Zimri-Lim commemorates the construction of a statue of Annunitum in the city of Šeḫrum, located close to Mari and Der. In the Epic of Zimri-Lim, she is said to assist the king during his campaigns.

A temple dedicated to Annunitum existed in Mari; it was referred to simply as E-Anunnītim, "Annunitum's house". A qadištu resided in it. One of the letters sent to Zimri-Lim by his wife Shibtu deals with a prophecy of Annunitum delivered by Ili-ḫaznaya, a member of her temple's staff, who explained that the goddess wants to warn the king about a rebellion. In another letter a woman named Addu-duri, who addresses herself as a maidservant of Zimri-Lim, informs the king that a female ecstatic (muḫḫûtum) conveyed another message of Annunitum meant for him, according to which he should remain in Mari and avoid travel, as it will let the goddess continue to communicate with him.

Later on in the kingdom of Ḫana, centered on Terqa, Annunitum was among deities invoked in oaths, as already attested in texts from the reign of the local ruler Zimri-lim (presumably named in honor of his Mariote forerunner); however she only appears in formulas most likely reflecting Babylonian, rather than local, culture.

=== Ur and Uruk ===
Annunitum was worshiped in Ur in the Ur III period. Offerings made to her are well documented in the archive of Shulgi-simti. Festivals involving Annunitum documented in it include nabrium, held in fall, a banquet (kaš-dé-a) held in summer, and elūnum, the nature of which is uncertain. A temple dedicated to her is well attested in administrative texts, and might have been originally built by Shu-Sin. In one of his inscriptions presumed to commemorate this event he refers to her as his spouse. Two Ur III texts from Ur of uncertain dating mentions the staff (gìr-sè-ga) of the temples of Annunitum, Shuwala and Allatum.

Kings from the Third Dynasty of Ur also introduced Annunitum to Uruk. She was worshiped there as one of the members of the entourage of Inanna, as attested in the archive of Shulgi-simti. However, she later disappears from texts from this city until the first millennium BCE. A letter from the scholar Mār-Ištar to a Neo-Assyrian ruler, most likely Esarhaddon, mentions the repair of statues representing her, Nanaya, Uṣur-amāssu, Kurunnītu and ^{d}IGI.DU. A text from the reign of Nabu-apla-iddina mentions a šangû priest in her service. Paul-Alain Beaulieu suggests she might have been one of the minor goddesses worshiped in the Eanna complex, similarly to Aḫlamayītu, Bēlet-balāṭi, Kurunnītu and Kanisurra, and that members of this group were collectively referred to as "the ladies" (^{d}GAŠAN.MEŠ = ^{d}bēlētu), but stresses the evidence is inconclusive. In the Seleucid period, she might have been one of the deities celebrated during the akītu festival of Ishtar, which focused on her various local manifestations (such as Urkayītu and Bēlet-Eanna of Udannu) and courtiers (such as Kilili). However, her only possible attestation occurs in a broken passage, and the restoration of the name is uncertain.

=== Other attestations ===
==== Other Mesopotamian cities ====
A mace head dedicated to Ishtar-Anunnitum by Rimush has been discovered during excavations in Assur.

One of the year names of Shar-kali-sharri refers to the construction of temples of Annunitum and Ilaba in Babylon. A later topographical text indicates the former bore the ceremonial name E-saggašarra, "foremost house of the universe". It is presumed that E-mesigakalammašarra, "house of all given me of the land", also attested as the name of a temple of Annunitum in Babylon, is a variant rather than a separate house of worship. It continued to function through the first millennium BCE. An Old Babylonian prayer additionally associated Annunitum with the E-turkalamma ("house, cattle pen of the land"), though the main deity of this temple was Bēlet-Bābili (Ishtar of Babylon).

In the Ur III period a shrine dedicated to Annunitum existed near Eresh, though it ceased to function in the third decade of Shulgi's reign.

Annunitum was also worshiped in Nippur in the Ur III period. In the Isin-Larsa period she received offerings in the Ekur temple complex, as attested in a list from the reign of Damiq-ilishu of Isin.

An inscription of Ishme-Dagan discovered in Isin mentions the appointment of a certain Tarām-pala-migrīša as an amalūtum priestess at the request of Annunitum.

Itur-Shamash of Kisurra built a temple of Annunitum.

In the Old Babylonian period Annunitum was also worshiped in Malgium. The local ruler Takil-ilissu mentioned her alongside Ulmašītum, Anu, Ninshubur, Dan-bītum and Rašub-bītum in a foundation inscription imploring them to punish anyone who would destroy this text. Nathan Wasserman and Ygal Bloch suggest that he might have mentioned her in order to evoke the tradition of rulers of the Akkadian Empire.

In Nineveh in the Neo-Assyrian period Annunitum might have been worshiped in the temple of Ishtar of Nineveh, without necessarily being identified with her.

==== Outside Mesopotamia ====
On the seal of Zardamu, a king of Karaḫar from the Ur III period, Annunitum is addressed as his mother.

An inscription of the Elamite king Atta-hušu of the Sukkalmah dynasty written in Akkadian indicates that he dedicated a temple in Susa to Annunitum. Texts from the same city contemporary with Old Babylonian sources from Mesopotamia mention priests in her service and preserve a number of theophoric names invoking her.

=== Uncertain attestations ===
==== Annu ====
It has been suggested that the theonym Annu known from texts from Mari might be a variant form of Annunitum or otherwise related to her. However, Ichiro Nakata argues that Annu's character should be considered unknown, and that only her gender can be established with certainty.

Annuis the single most common theophoric element in names of women, appearing in forty eight different types. Examples include Annu-amriya, Annu-asiya, Annu-damqa, Annu-gāmiltī and Annu-tukultī. Masculine names invoking her have been identified too, but overall feminine ones predominate. Nakata points out that the theonym Annu is largely absent from texts from Mari despite commonly appearing in theophoric names, and compares this phenomenon to the similar cases of Admu and Kakka.

==== Nunu ====
A further possible variant of the name is Nunu. Antoine Cavigneaux and Manfred Krebernik suggest that it might be a variant of Annu, and point out that ^{d}nu-nu, while possible to interpret as Nunu with a determinative designating this word as theonym, can also be read as an-nu-nu. An alternate proposal is that Nunu was a deity associated with fish from sweetwater lagoons, though this remains unconfirmed. Furthermore, it remains uncertain if Nunu attested in theophoric names is related to an identically named demon associated with the steppe (maškim-edin-na-ke_{4}) who appears in the god list An = Anum (tablet IV, line 270), and with a further figure sharing this name equated in a late esoteric text with Lugaldukuga.

In Old Babylonian Mari Nunu appears in twelve types of masculine theophoric names and six types of feminine ones. Attestations from outside Mari are known too, but they are similarly limited to theophoric names. The oldest known examples are the name of a son of the king of Kish mentioned in a text from Ebla, Ir-KUM-Nunu (reading of the second sign is uncertain), and a number of names from Old Akkadian texts from the north of Babylonia, such as Da-Nunu and Šu-Nunu. Later examples are uncommonly attested in Old Assyrian and Old Babylonian texts from various locations.
