= Ninsianna =

Mesopotamian astral deity

- Personification of Venus
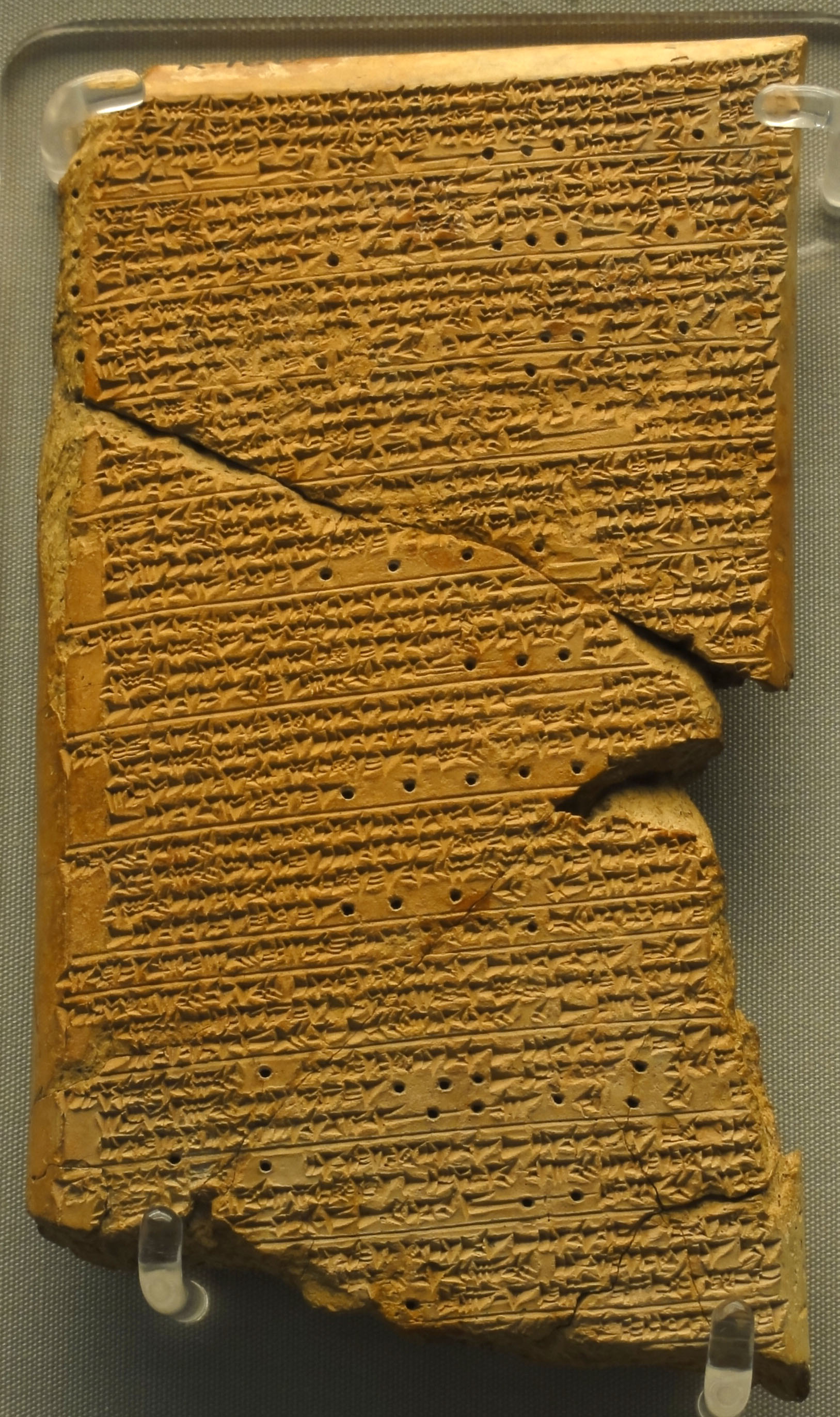
- The Venus tablet of Ammisaduqa. Ninsianna is mentioned as a name for the planet Venus.
- Major cult center: Nippur, possibly Ur
- Planet: Venus
- Symbol: a star
- Gender: variable

Genealogy
- Spouse: possibly Kabta

Equivalents
- Hurrian: Pinikir

Ninsianna (Sumerian: "Red Queen of Heaven") was a Mesopotamian deity considered to be the personification of Venus. This theonym also served as the name of the planet in astronomical texts until the end of the Old Babylonian period. There is evidence that Ninsianna's gender varied between locations, and both feminine and masculine forms of this deity were worshiped. Due to their shared connection to Venus, Ninsianna was associated with Inanna. Furthermore, the deity Kabta appears alongside Ninsianna in many texts, but the character of the relation between them remains unclear.

The oldest evidence for the worship of Ninsianna comes from the Ur III period, and includes references to the construction of two temples of this deity. Many further attestations are available from the Isin-Larsa and Old Babylonian periods, including royal inscriptions, personal letters, seals and theophoric names. The use of Ninsianna's name to refer to the planet Venus declined later, though the feminine form of this deity continued to be worshiped, for example in Nippur. In the Hellenistic period, she appears in ritual texts from Uruk,

== Character ==
Ninsianna, the "Red Queen of Heaven," was a divine representation of the planet Venus. In the second millennium BCE this theonym could be used to represent the astral body in various works of Mesopotamian astronomy, though in the first millennium BCE the name Dilbat came to be used more commonly instead, with the exception of Neo-Babylonian Venus tablet of Ammisaduqa, which relied on Old Babylonian sources. It refers to Ninsianna as the name of Venus during the month of Nisan.

Many of Ninsianna's epithets highlight a connection to light and radiance. A text from Sippar-Amnanum uses the phrase ilum elum, "radiant god." A late source from Uruk calls Ninsianna the "mistress who illuminates heaven." It has been proposed that in art, for example on cylinder seals, Ninsianna was depicted in the form of a goddess with a star on her horned crown, or a goddess accompanied by a star.

Ninsianna was occasionally associated with haruspicy, like a number of other astral deities. A compendium of oil omens states that oil spreading into the shape of a star is an omen pertaining to Ninsianna.

An inscription of Rim-Sîn I presents Ninsianna both as a deity of justice, "judge, supreme advisor, who distinguishes between truth and falsehood," and as a divine warrior.

=== Gender ===
Ninsianna's gender varies between known sources. A scholarly tablet from the archive of Ur-Utu, who served the chief lamentation priest (kalamāḫu) of Annunitum in Sippar-Amnanum, indicates that it is possible that as a personification of Venus, the deity was viewed as female at sunset and male at sunrise. Joan Goodnick Westenholz has characterized Ninsianna as a "dimorphic (...) goddess," while Julia M. Asher-Greve—as a "bi-gendered deity." It has been proposed that Ninsianna was originally considered to be female, but her gender became variable due to contact between Sumerians and speakers of Semitic languages who represented the same celestial body as a male deity. However, according Westenholz Ninsianna's case is distinct from instances of deities whose gender changed due to syncretism, such as Ninshubur.

Gender of Ninsianna seems to vary based on location as well. It is generally accepted that in Sippar, he was worshiped as a male deity. Similar evidence is known from Ur and Girsu. Rim-Sîn I of Larsa on at least one occasion referred to Ninsianna as male, calling him as a “king” (lugal) who helped him in battles against his enemies. Douglas Frayne nonetheless translates the inscription as if a feminine deity was meant, "for the goddess Ninsianna, my lord," though Manfred Krebernik in a review notes this is incorrect. Frayne himself acknowledges that lugal is otherwise exclusively a title of gods, not goddesses. According to Daniel Schwemer, direct references to masculine Ninsianna are overall relatively common. However, some evidence in favor of interpreting specific references to Ninsianna as designating this deity as a god rather than a goddess, for example an inscription of Iddin-Sin of Simurrum, is uncertain, as it is possible that the Akkadian word ilu in such cases might be employed as a gender neutral term, similar to Sumerian dingir. Prayers from Kassite archives appear to present Ninsianna as a goddess, rather than a god, as evidenced by the connection to the šuba stone mentioned in them. Ninsianna was also considered female in the context of the worship of this deity in Nippur, Isin and Uruk.

== Associations with other deities ==
The god list An = Anum states that Ninsianna was regarded as “Ishtar of the star,” Ištar kakkabi. The same explanation of her name is given in an emesal vocabulary. Jeremiah Peterson instead favors the translation "goddess of the star." The association between Ninsianna and Inanna goes back to the Ur III period. The latter goddess own association with the planet Venus goes back to the Uruk period. However, their functions in Mesopotamian religion were separate. In Larsa, Ninsianna and Inanna were worshiped separately from each other, with only the former serving as a divine representation of the planet Venus. Separate cults of them both are also attested in sources from Nippur. As an extension of the association between Inanna and Ninsianna, in the Isin-Larsa period, the former was partially syncretised with Isin’s dynastic goddess Ninisina, with the justification relying partially on the similarity between the names of Ninsianna and Ninisina.

A deity named Kabta ("star") or Maḫdianna ("lofty one of heaven") was frequently associated with Ninsianna. They appear together in multiple god lists. A certain Sîn-išmeanni described himself as "servant of Ninsianna and Kabta" on a cylinder seal. However, the exact nature of the relationship between these two deities, and even Kabta's gender, remain uncertain due to scarcity and state of preservation of available sources. Wilfred G. Lambert considered it possible that the deity was male and functioned as the spouse of Ninsianna, but there is also evidence in favor of viewing Kabta as a goddess, including a seal depicting two goddesses who might be Ninsianna and Kabta. According to Jeremiah Peterson, in the god list An = Anum and in the lexical text Proto-Diri, Ninsianna, Kabta and Maḫdianna are all explained as Ištar kakkabi, and thus as goddesses.

The goddess Timua frequently appears in god lists and other lexical lists alongside Ninsianna and Kabta, and is also explained with the same phrase as both of them in An = Anum. She is also attested in prayers from the Kassite period. A variant spelling of her name, Simua, might indicate that it was derived from si-mu_{2}, "horn growing," though Manfred Krebernik remarks this even if this assumption is correct, it might only be the reflection of a folk etymology. An = Anum also lists ^{d}ALAM as a byname of Timua, though according to Wilfred G. Lambert this is most likely a reference of the concept of deified statues, and does not indicate any relation to other deities whose names could be written with the same logogram, such as Alala and Belili.

A god list from Emar indicates that the Hurrians viewed Pinikir as analogous to Ninsianna. Pinikir's gender varies in Hurrian religious texts.

A late hymn which uses "rare and unusual lexical equations" to identify Antu with other deities equates her with Ninsianna. According to Julia Krul, the goal was to establish Antu as "Ištar’s superior in the domain of the heavens" as a part of a broader phenomenon of extending the scope of her cult in Uruk in the Hellenistic period.

== Worship ==
Ninsianna was worshiped in various locations in Mesopotamia and is attested for the first time in texts from the Ur III period, such as an inscription of Shulgi pertaining to the construction of a temple for this deity. According to Walther Sallaberger, a tablet from the reign of Amar-Sin which mentions the construction of a different temple of Ninsianna might pertain to a house of worship located in Nippur, though other locations have been proposed as well in the past, including Sippar, which he considers unlikely, and Uruk.

The cult of Ninsianna is well attested in the following Isin-Larsa and Old Babylonian periods as well. She was worshiped by the kings of dynasty of Isin, such as Iddin-Dagan. A temple dedicated to Ninisianna, É-ešbarzida ("House of True Decisions"), was rebuilt by Rim-Sîn I of Larsa, and might have been located in Ur, where a clay cone with an inscription commemorating this event has been found. Ninsianna is also mentioned in a curse formula of Iddin-Sin of Simurrum. A second similar formula has been attributed either to him, to his son Zabazuna, or less plausibly to Anubanini. A more recent analysis points toward Anubanini.

Ninsianna, according to Julia M. Asher-Greve treated as a goddess in this context, is one of the female deities most commonly mentioned in personal letters from the Old Babylonian period, in which she appears less often than Ishtar, but with comparable frequency to Aya or Gula. One of them invokes her in the role of a tutelary deity of a specific family. In another, the same deity and Ilabrat are asked for a blessing for the person it was addressed to. Many seal inscriptions mentioning Ninsianna are known too. For example, three have been found in Sippar. Some such seals mention this deity alongside Adad. Occasionally Ninsianna appears as a theophoric element in personal names, with known examples including Ur-Ninsianna, Lu-Ninsianna, and Mariote Yar’ip-Ninsianna. In Old Babylonian sources from the city of Babylon itself Ninsianna is one of best attested goddesses in various documents, next to Ishtar, Inanna of Zabalam, Annunitum and Zarpanit. According to Rivkah Harris, a temple of Ninsianna must have existed in Sippar, as a pašišu priest of this deity is attested in one document. A text from this location deals with an oracular inquiry to Ninsianna about the well-being of Ur-Utu. A reference to a city gate of Ninsianna is also known, though the tablet is broken making the context it appears in difficult to ascertain.

The use of Ninsianna's name to refer to Venus declined after the Old Babylonian period. However, there is evidence that the feminine form of Ninsianna continued to be worshiped in the Kassite period. The existence of a temple dedicated to her in Nippur is attested in a Middle Babylonian metrological text, but its ceremonial name is not listed in it. A Neo-Assyrian version of the Mîs-pî rituals involved offerings to Ninsianna, as well as the astral representations of other deities. While absent from texts from Uruk from Neo-Babylonian period, Ninsianna also came to be worshiped in this city in the late first millennium BCE. She is attested in the description of a parade of deities accompanying Ishtar during a parade celebrating the New Year festival (akītu), which also involved Nanaya, Ninigizibara, Išartu, Ninmeurur, Ilid-eturra, Šaĝepada, Ninsun and other goddesses, most of whom are known for association with either Ishtar or the city of Uruk. According to Julia Krul, she was introduced to the local pantheon in this period because of her association with Inanna-Ishtar.
