= Kabta =

Kabta, inscribed ^{d}kab-ta, ^{d}ka-ab-ta, ^{d}TA-gu-nû, or later ^{d}TAxMI, was a rather obscure Mesopotamian deity who appears in texts and seals of the second and first millennium BC. He is frequently paired with Ninsianna, the “Red Lady of the Heavens” or Venus star, who immediately follows him on the Weidner god-list.

== Provenance ==
He was first attested during the Ur III period, sometimes under the Sumerian name Maḫdianna, inscribed ^{d}maḫ-di-an-na, the “Lofty one of heaven.” This suggests an astral character and explains his pairing with “Ištar (of) the star” (Ninsi’anna). Unfortunately, due to a break in the god-list An = Anum, further elucidation is unavailable and even the god’s gender is uncertain. Lambert suggested that he was her spouse and seal impressions from Larsa during the Isin-Larsa period seem to confirm this. Kabta appears as the theophoric element in several names of the Old Babylonian and Kassite period, such as Nūr-Kabta, Amat-Kabta, Kabta-naṣir and Šu-Kabta.

Kabta is often confused with Kulla, the brick-god, in literature, probably due to a misreading of line 337 from 'Enki and the World Order' by Samuel Noah Kramer, published in his work “Sumerian Mythology”, although Lambert blamed Dietz Otto Edzard for this error.
