= Irnina =

Mesopotamian goddess of victory

- Goddess of victory or epithet of deities

Irnina or Irnini was a Mesopotamian goddess regarded as the personification of victory. The name could also be applied as an epithet to other deities.

== Name and character ==
The theonym Irnina was usually written in cuneiform as ^{d}ir-ni-na or ^{d}ir-ni-ni. An additional partially preserved logographic spelling using the sign MUŠ is known from the god list An = Anum. It can be translated as "victory", and the goddess can accordingly be understood as a personification of this concept, a Victoria-like figure. Jeremiah Peterson describes her as a deity associated with the underworld. Margaret Jaques suggests comparing her with Irḫan. She points out that the former appears in sequence with Kumulmul and Ušaḫara, the spouses of Shara, in the An = Anum forerunner, and the latter in zi-pad litanies.

=== As an epithet of other deities ===
The distinct deity Irnina is to be separated from the use of this title to refer to a warlike aspect of Ishtar. Margaret Jaques argues that the name originally referred to the former, but came to be used as an epithet of Ishtar possibly due to shared dangerous and unpredictable characteristics of the two. Irnina is also an epithet of the warlike aspect of Ishtar in the Agushaya poem. The Hymn to the City of Arbela identifies Ishtar of Arbela with Irnina. The name could also function as a title of Nanaya and Damkina. Furthermore, a syncretistic hymn to Marduk, which otherwise features only male deities, includes Irnina among the names rassigned to his aspects.

== Attestations ==
Irnina is well attested in literary texts dealing with the campaigns of rulers of the Akkadian Empire, especially Sargon and Naram-Sin. In the so-called Naram-Sin Epic, which describes the confrontation between the eponymous ruler and the king of Apišal and his allies, Irnina is one of the deities assisting the former.

An inscription of the Assyrian king Ashur-resh-ishi I dealing with the reconstruction of the temple of Ishtar in Nineveh lists Irnina among the deities favorable to this king, alongside Enlil, Ashur, Anu and Ea.

In the god list An = Anum Irnina occurs in the entourage of Ningishzida (tablet V, lines 260-261). However, the role she played in his court is not known. Frans Wiggermann suggests that their association reflected Ningishzida's ability to guarantee victory, which he considers one of the aspects of his character as a "reliable god". He also suggests that Irnina might have been regarded as a hypostasis of his warlike aspect. Irnina is also attested in the Weidner god list, where she is listed after Ereshkigal, Allatum and Irkalla and before Dannina, which might reflect a connection with the underworld. Either Irnina or Irkalla might be present in a fragmentary non-standard god list from Old Babylonian Nippur, though the restoration of the name is uncertain. Only the determinative and the first sign are preserved.

In the so-called "Standard Babylonian" edition of the Epic of Gilgamesh, Ninsun mentions that she is aware that her son Gilgamesh is destined to be associated with deities such as Irnina and Ningishzida while she implores Shamash to help him. This passage reflects the portrayal of Irnina as an underworld deity. Later the Cedar Forest to which the hero and his companion Enkidu venture is described as the property of "Irnini", though according to Andrew R. George in this context the name might be used as a generic designation for goddesses, not as a specific deity, as it occurs in parallel with īli, "gods".
