= Agushaya Hymn =

Hymn of praise to the goddess Ištar

The Agušaya Hymn or Song of Agušaya is an Old Babylonian literary work, a “song of praise”, written in the Akkadian language concerning the goddess Ištar, identified with the serpent deity Irnina. It may have been called “the Snake has Turned” in antiquity, as it has ú-ta-ar MUŠ inscribed at the top edge at the beginning. It is extant on two unprovenanced tablets, designated A (Note: Tablet A, VAT 5946, VS 10, 214, in the Vorderasiatisches Museum Berlin.) and B, (Note: Tablet B, unknown siglum and present whereabouts, RA 15, 159ff) the latter of which includes a request for eternal life for king Hammurabi (reigned c. 1792 BC to c. 1750 BC), on the fifth column, 26th line, for whom it is thought to have been composed as an epic hymn of celebration of “the mad dancer in battle”. It is arranged into ten kirugú-stanzas (Akkadian: šēru) and six ĝešgiĝal-antiphons as lyrical retorts, the numbering of which suggest that the work extends over the two tablets, although the second may not be the actual sequel of the first as the first is an eight column tablet while the second only has six columns and there are apparently subtle differences in late Old Babylonian cursive cuneiform distinguishing them, suggesting tablet A is the younger copy.

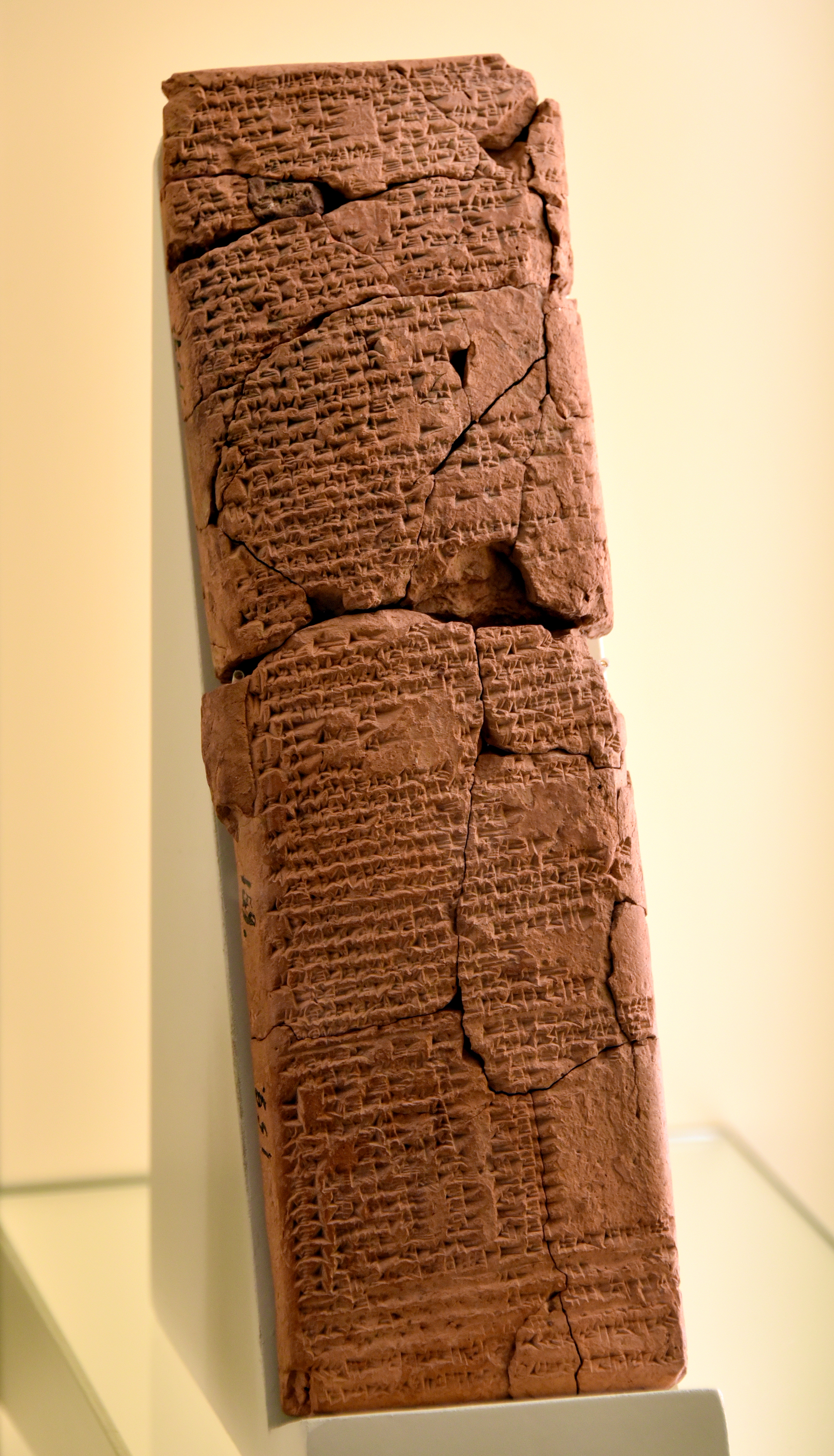
Hymn, a ritual text of the goddess Ishtar. From Babylon, Iraq. Neo-Babylonian period. Vorderasiatisches Museum, Berlin

== The text ==
Among the most difficult literary texts in Old Babylonian, the work opens lu-na-i-id šu-ur-bu-ta, “let me praise the greatest”. Ištar, the goddess of fertility and war, is terrifying to the gods with her wild, ferocious and "virile" antics. “She dances around gods and kings in her manliness” and “young men are cut off as if for spears.”

The god Ea, who is angered by her outrageous behavior, fashions a suitable counterfoil, Ṣāltum, “discord” out of the dirt beneath his fingernails, to provide her with distraction, somewhat reminiscent of the purpose of Enkidu in the Epic of Gilgamesh. Ea tells Ṣāltum he has created her to humiliate Ištar and sends this ferocious beast to challenge her. Much of the subsequent text is fragmentary, however the adversaries seem to engage in a protracted whirling dance of battle. Finally, Ištar entreats Ea to save her from this monstrous virago, “May she return to her cave! Ea opened his mouth and the hero of the gods spoke to Agušaya: ‘to be sure, as soon as you said it, I will do (it).’”

With Ištar's taming, Ea proposes the instigation of an annual Ištar festival, providing an explanation for the origin of the guštum, a whirling dance performed during the festivities, commemorating the war-like character of Ištar.

=== Principal publications ===
- Heinrich Zimmern (1913). Vorderasiatische Schritdenkmäler der Königlichen Museen Zu Berlin. J. C. Hinrichs. pp. 50–53. line art for Agušaya A
- Heinrich Zimmern (1916). "Ištar und Şaltu : ein altakkadisches Lied". Berichte über die Verhandlungen der Königlich Sächsischen Gesellschaft der Wissenschaften zu Leipzig. Philologisch-historische Klasse. B.G. Teubner. pp. 10–28. translation of Agušaya A
- Jean-Vincent Scheil (1918). "Le Poème D'Agušaya". Revue d'Assyriologie et d'archéologie orientale. 15 (4): 169–182. JSTOR 23284572. transliteration and translation of Agušaya A and B
- Benjamin Foster (1977). "Ea and Saltu". In M. Ellis (ed.). Essays on the Ancient Near East in Memory of Jaco Joel Finkelstein. Archon Books. pp. 79–86.
- Brigitte Groneberg (1981). "Philologische Bearbeitung des Agušayahymnus". Revue d'Assyriologie et d'archéologie orientale. 75 (2): 107–134. JSTOR 23282324. reproduces her 1972 dissertation transliteration and translation of Agušaya A
- Jean Bottéro and Samuel Noah Kramer (1989). Lorsque les dieux faisaient l'homme. Gallimard. pp. 204–219.
- K. Hecker (1989). W.H.P. Romer, K. Hecker (ed.). Texte aus der Umwelt des Alten Testaments 2, 5: Lieder und Gebete 1. pp. 731–738. translation
- Brigitte Groneberg (1997). Lob der Ištar: Gebet und Ritual an die altbabylonische Venusgöttin Tanatti Ištar. Styx. pp. 73–93. transliteration and translation of Agušaya A and B
- Benjamin Foster (2005). Before The Muses: An Anthology Of Akkadian Literature. Univ. Press of Maryland. pp. 78–88.
- Michael P. Streck (2010). "Notes on the Old Babylonian Hymns of Agušaya". Journal of the American Oriental Society. 130 (4): 561–571. JSTOR 23044558. provides philological notes to his new translations posted online at SEAL references 2.1.5.1 and 2.1.5.2.
