= Dērītum =

Mesopotamian goddess

- Tutelary goddess of Dēr
- Major cult center: Dēr, Mari

Dērītum or Dīrītum was a Mesopotamian goddess associated with Dēr in the kingdom of Mari. While she was originally a hypostasis of Ishtar, she eventually developed into a fully separate deity, and achieved a degree of prominence in the local pantheon during the reign of Zimri-Lim in the 18th century BCE. She is attested in various administrative texts, as well as in personal letters. A celebration focused on her was one of the main festivals in the kingdom of Mari, and participants included both members of the royal family and foreign dignitaries.

== Name ==
The name Dērītum (Dīrītum) can be translated as "one of Dēr" (Dīr). It is assumed that she was a local manifestation of Ishtar, and a single text (ARM 24 263) outright mentions "Ishtar-Dērītum". However, similar to well attested Annunitum, who also initially functioned as epithet, she eventually came to be viewed as a separate deity.

Georges Dossin originally proposed that Dērītum's point of origin was the eastern city of Der, but today it is agreed that it was instead Dēr, a settlement located in the immediate proximity of Mari, well attested as one of the religious centers of the kingdom centered on the latter city. Stephanie Dalley suggests that it was around fifteen kilometers further downstream from the capital. Identification with modern Abu Kamal has been suggested. A shrine dedicated to Dērītum was located there. The city also served as a fort.

== Worship ==
Dērītum was worshiped in Mari, Dēr and Zurubbān. A shrine dedicated to her existed in the first of these settlements, but it is not certain if it was located in its "sacred compound" or if it was a part of the royal palace.

Alfonso Archi notes that in one of the early offering lists from Mari, "Ishtar-Dērītum" appears in the very beginning, after Ishtar herself and before Annunitum and Dagan, and concludes this group served as the major deities of the city. It has been suggested that during the reign of Zimri-Lim, Dērītum, at the time already understood as a fully separate goddess, came to surpass Ishtar in the local pantheon. In an offering list from the beginning of this period, formerly known as the "Pantheon List", she is a recipient of seven sheep, more than any other deities, including the other lead figures of the local pantheon such as Dagan or Itūr-Mēr. Sacrifices of the same animals to her are also mentioned in a number of texts from the archive of Asqudum, a collection of administrative texts. It is also known that Zimri-Lim in the fifth year of his reign offered a golden throne to her. In Zurubbān, she received gold and silver on one occasion.

A celebration of Dērītum was one of the major Mariote religious festivals. It took place annually in the eleventh month of the local calendar, Kiṣkiṣṣum. It served as a display of royal devotion to the local deities. It involved a procession during which the reigning monarch, the queen mother, further members of the royal family and foreign guests moved alongside the statue of the goddess from Mari to her cult center, where she was celebrated in a ceremony known as siḫirtum by singers and dancers, and received offerings of oil alongside a number of other deities, including Addu, Shamash, Sîn, Baḫ and Tuziba, before eventually returning to the palace. It lasted for seven days, and in addition to Dēr and Mari, the celebrations might have also taken place in Zurubbān (near Terqa), though this is not certain. Known foreign participants at the time of Zimri Lim include Kabiya, the king of Kaḫat, and Yumraṣ-El.

It is known that the statue of Dērītum had to undertake a rummukum ("bathing") ceremony, presumably a purification ritual involving oil. It is not known if it was performed routinely or if it constituted a festival as well.

In Mariote texts, Dērītum is attested in both feminine and masculine theophoric names. According to Ichiro Nakata, it is additionally possible that the theophoric element Dīri was an abbreviated spelling of her name. Some examples are also known from outside Mari: a single one, Dērītum-ummī, has been identified in the corpus of texts from Chagar Bazar, while the inscription on a seal from Alalakh (Tell Atchana) mentions that the father of its owner was named Iddin-Dērītum.

== Miscellaneous attestations ==
In a letter to her husband Zimri-Lim, queen Shibtu mentions that according to an oracle of Dērītum relayed by a certain Qišti-Dērītum his position is secure, and that the attacks of his foreign enemies will not be successful. She is also mentioned in a letter from the high-ranking official Sammêtar, who informs the king that he will be absent from a celebration focused on this goddess because advice he received from a physician treating his sickness.

One of the prophecies issued by the clergy of Dagan from Terqa mentions Dērītum and expressed concern that the goddess might remain idle regardless of the actions of Mari's rival Eshnunna, which has been interpreted as a negative reaction to the possibility that some of the inhabitants of her city wanted to form a pact with the latter kingdom despite the hostilities.
