= Inanna of Zabalam =

Mesopotamian goddess, hypostasis of Inanna

- Tutelary goddess of Zabalam
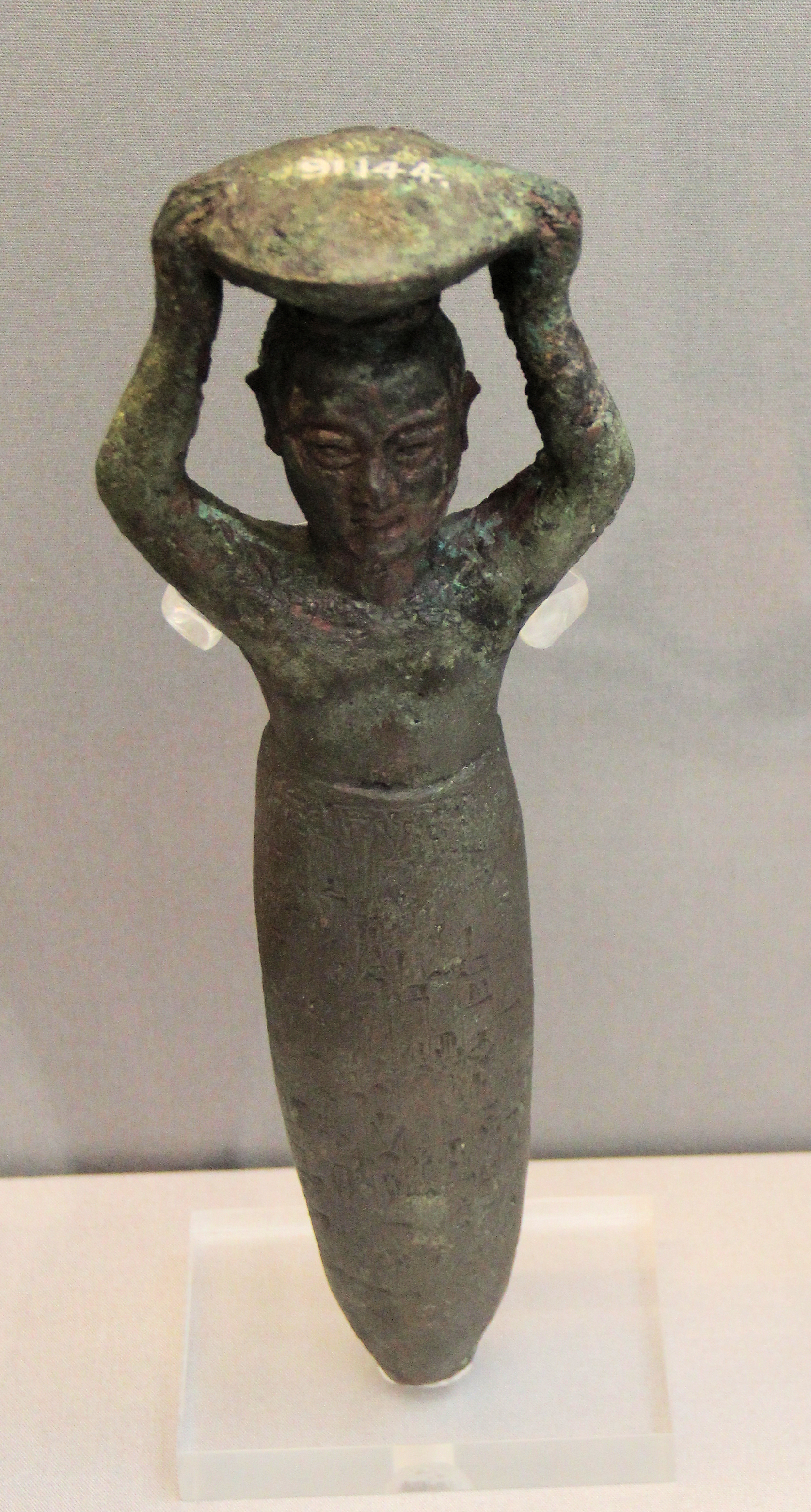
- A foundation figurine dedicated to Inanna of Zabalam from the reign of Warad-Sin of Larsa
- Other names: Supālītum, Sugallītu, Nin-Zabalam
- Major cult center: Zabalam, Larsa

Genealogy
- Children: Shara

Inanna of Zabalam (𒀭𒈹𒍝𒈽𒀕𒆠, ^{d}inanna zabalam^{ki}; also Supālītum, Sugallītu, Nin-Zabalam) was a hypostasis of the Mesopotamian goddess Inanna associated with the city of Zabalam. It has been proposed that she was initially a separate deity, perhaps known under the name Nin-UM, who came to be absorbed by the goddess of Uruk at some point in the prehistory of Mesopotamia and lost her unknown original character in the process, though in certain contexts she nonetheless could still be treated as distinct. She was regarded as the mother of Shara, the god of Umma, a city located near Zabalam.

The worship of Inanna of Zabalam is already attested in the early texts from the Uruk period, which makes her one of the oldest tutelary goddesses of specific cities known from Mesopotamian sources. Her temple was known under the ceremonial name Gigunna. It is attested in sources from Early Dynastic, Sargonic and Ur III periods, and from various literary texts. Later on, she came to be associated with the city of Larsa. An inscription of king Warad-Sin mentions the construction of a temple dedicated to her, the Ekalamtanigurru, possibly identical with the older sanctuary. She is also attested in various religious texts and in theophoric names from Larsa. Further cities where she was worshiped in the Old Babylonian period include Nippur, Uruk, Isin, Kisurra and Babylon. It is presumed that her main cult center, Zabalam, was eventually abandoned, though she is still mentioned in documents from the reign of the First Sealand dynasty and references to various temples dedicated to her occur in the Canonical Temple List from the subsequent Kassite period.

== Origin and names ==
Inanna of Zabalam is among the oldest attested examples of distinct manifestations of deities tied to specific geographical locations. She was the tutelary goddess of the city of Zabalam, also known as Sugal in Akkadian (modern Tell Ibzeikh in Iraq). It is agreed that while to a degree the local manifestations of Inanna shared a "common essence", they also could have distinct, unique traits, and interpretations presenting them as facets of one goddess or as distinct figures could coexist. For example, in the Weidner god list, Inanna of Zabalam occurs separately from Inanna herself and Dumuzi, alongside other local manifestations, which might indicate in this context she was not strictly viewed as a hypostasis, but rather as a separate local goddess.

According to Joan Goodnick Westenholz, the original character of the tutelary goddess of Zabalam was lost prior to the beginning of recorded history in a process in which "her selfhood was swallowed up by that of Inana of Uruk." While it is presumed that many cities adopted the cult of Inanna from Uruk in the Uruk period already, in Zabalam the introduction of the Urukean goddess might have resulted in such a situation due to the geographic proximity of both cities. Westenholz suggests her original name might have been Nin-UM, attested in the zame hymns from the Early Dynastic period. According to Marcos Such-Gutiérrez, Nin-UM additionally occurs in a single literary text from Adab predating the Sargonic period. However, she is absent from the god lists from Fara and Abu Salabikh, and from all known god lists from later periods. Antoine Cavigneaux and Manfred Krebernik in the corresponding entry in Reallexikon der Assyriologie und Vorderasiatischen Archäologie refer to Nin-UM neutrally as a deity, rather than specifically a goddess, though they accept the name might refer to a hypostasis of Inanna in all contexts it is attested in. The meaning of the name Nin-UM is unknown. Krebernik and Jan Lisman propose that Nin-UM might mean "lady of the reed bundle", with the last sign corresponding to the term um (Akkadian ummu), "rush rope" or "reed rope"; they argue the name might have been a title related to an early symbol of Inanna, interpreted by Assyriologists as a bundle of reeds. A connection with the month name ne-UM from the local calendar of Ur has been ruled out.

Inanna of Zabalam could also be referred to with the name Supālītum (Supallītu), derived from the Akkadian spelling of the toponym, and through a folk etymology connected with the word supālu (sāpalu), "juniper." It was commonly used in Babylonian lexical texts. It occurs in the god list An = Anum as explanation of ^{d}Inanna-su-bala^{ki} (tablet IV, line 134). A second similar name was Sugallītu (Šugallītu; "she of Zabalam"), whose spelling might have been influenced by the term Esugal, referring to a ziggurat dedicated to Ishtar located in the city of Akkad, or alternatively by the word sukkallu. The latter name could be written logographically as ^{d}ZU.GAL or ^{d}SU.GAL. A further possible name, ^{d}ZA-BA-AD, perhaps to be read as DIĜIR Zabalam, "the goddess of Zabalam", has been identified on an exercise tablet from Susa. Texts from Umma from the Ur III period also use the epithet Nin-Zabalam, "lady of Zabalam", especially when referring to the worship of this goddess in the settlement A-ka-sal_{4}^{ki}.

== Associations with other deities ==
The god Shara, commonly referred to simply as a son of Inanna in modern literature aimed at general audiences, was specifically regarded as the son of the goddess of Zabalam. The translation of the only passage mentioning his father is uncertain. Julia M. Asher-Greve suggests this tradition was a secondary development, and Shara was only assigned to Inanna as a son to make it possible to refer to her with the epithet ama, "mother", though she also notes it was seemingly not related to motherhood, but rather to senior position in the pantheon and authority over specific cities. Manuel Molina instead assumes that it reflected the close relation between their respective cult centers.

An inscription of Warad-Sin refers to Inanna of Zabalam as a daughter of Suen. The circle of deities associated with her also included Apiriĝmaḫ, as well as two goddesses attested in an analogous role in Uruk, Ninshubur and Nanaya.

In the Zame Hymns, Nin-UM, a deity possibly identical with Inanna of Zabalam, appears in association with the god Ištaran. She is also equated with Inanna-kur, an early hypostasis of Inanna already attested in sources from the Uruk period. However, the latter also maintained an independent identity and could be instead linked with ^{d}Men, a deity presumed to be a deified crown.

== Worship ==
=== Early history ===
The oldest evidence for the existence of Zabalam and for the worship of its tutelary goddess comes from the Uruk III period (c. 3100 – 2900 BCE). The name of the city was written in cuneiform logographically as MUŠ_{3}.UNUG, following a typical early pattern in which the combination of the name of a local deity, in this case, Inanna (MUŠ_{3}) and the sign "sanctuary" (UNUG) was used to render the name of city. Analogously, Larsa was rendered as UTU.UNUG and Ur - NANNA_{x}.UNUG. Later on the sign ZA was added as a phonetic indicator, though the writing continued to be variable until the Old Babylonian period. The only other female tutelary deities of specific cities known from comparably early sources as Inanna of Zabalam are Inanna of Uruk, Nanshe, Ezina and Nisaba.

=== Third millennium BCE ===
Inanna of Zabalam belonged to the local pantheon of the state (later province) of Umma, though as noted by Manuel Molina, her cult likely already had "supraregional" significance in the late Uruk period. In the Early Dynastic period she is attested in the Zame Hymns. The eleventh out of seventy hymns forming the full sequence is focused on her. The relatively early placement reflects her religious importance. The hymn concludes with a line referring to her with the name Nin-UM. This theonym occurs for a second time in the penultimate hymn, where the goddess is mentioned alongside Utu and Ištaran. The following line lists three weapons, a net, a bow and a lapis lazuli club (šita_{2}), presumed to be attributes of the deities, as other sources associate Utu with nets and Inanna with clubs; evidence for a bow being Ištaran's weapon is however lacking otherwise. Manfred Krebernik and Jan Lisman propose that the mention of these three deities reflects the presence of statues representing them in the temple of the main deity lauded in the hymn, Ninniĝara. The toponym listed is Kullaba.

Later literary texts such as Inanna's Descent and the hymn Inanna F indicate that Inanna's temple in Zabalam was known as Gigunna (Gi-gun_{4}^{ki}-na). In the Sargonic period, it was rebuilt by Naram-Sin or Shar-Kali-Sharri. However, only remnants of a later Old Babylonian structure have been found during excavations, last of which took part in 2001–2002 on behalf of State Board of Antiquities and Heritage of Iraq, but further research on the site is not possible due to extensive looting in the aftermath of the Iraq War rendering it "almost completely destroyed and virtually irrecoverable to archaeology." The temple was seemingly the center of economic activity of the city. Most of the documents which presumably originated in Zabalam come from the temple's archive, though provenance is often difficult to establish due to the entire area surrounding ancient Umma and Zabalam being affected by looting.

According to textual sources in the Ur III period the temple was nominally maintained by the governor of Umma, though the city of Zabalam was effectively under direct control of the royal family due to its religious and economic significance for the state. Queen Abi-simti was known for her devotion to Inanna of Zabalam, despite not originating in this city. However, she did own a house there, and it is possible that an estate of the royal family was located nearby. Texts from Umma from the same period indicate that Inanna of Zabalam ("Nin-Zabalam") was also worshiped in the settlement A-ka-sal_{4}^{ki}, and mention a gudu_{4} priest and a herdsman in her service.

Douglas Frayne argues that the myth Gilgamesh and the Bull of Heaven, which revolves around a conflict between the eponymous mythical king and Inanna, features Inanna of Zabalam as opposed to Inanna of Uruk. The oldest known copy of this composition dates back to the Ur III period, but he proposes that it might have originally been based on hostilities which occurred between Uruk and Zabalam in the Early Dynastic period. However, he stresses this interpretation is only hypothetical, as the goddess is described as a resident of Eanna, and while multiple temples bore this ceremonial name (including the original Eanna in Uruk, as well as temples in Lagash, Girsu and an unknown location under the control of the Manana dynasty), there is no evidence a sanctuary bearing it existed in Zabalam. Furthermore, he notes it has also alternatively been proposed that the goddess hostile to Gilgamesh might be Inanna of Akkad.

=== Second millennium BCE ===
Inanna of Zabalam retained her religious importance after the fall of the Third Dynasty of Ur, during the successive periods of the reigns of dynasties of Isin, Larsa and Babylon. She came to be strongly associated with the second of these three cities. A year formula of Warad-Sin of Larsa mentions the construction of a temple dedicated to her, the Ekalamtanigurru, "house which inspires dread in the land," according to Andrew R. George possibly to be identified with the earlier structure in Zabalam rebuilt by Shar-Kali-Shari. In the city of Larsa, she and a local manifestation of Inanna, "Queen-of-Larsa," were worshiped separately from each other. Her cult involved maḫḫûm (prophetic "ecstatics"), who are otherwise sparsely attested in southern Mesopotamia, and more commonly occur in texts from the west. Apparently both men and women could fulfill this function. Under the name Šugallītu, Inanna of Zabalam also appears in a greeting formula in a letter from this city (alongside Shamash), in a wisdom text mentioning offerings made to her, and in theophoric names such as Ubar-Šugallītu, Warad-Šugallītu, Šugallītu-gamil (in all cases the spellings used are logographic) and Kuk-Šugallītum (the theonym is spelled syllabically; the first element is Elamite).

Inanna of Zabalam was also worshiped in Nippur, Isin and Uruk. There are also references to the worship of "Inanna-Zabalam of Uruk" in Larsa. She additionally seemingly came to be viewed as one of the tutelary deities of the city Umma. Earlier this role belonged only to Shara and Ninura. A loan document mentions a month named after her, ITI na-ab-ri-ì (from nabrium, a type of festival) ša su-ga-li-ti-im. It comes from the early Old Babylonian period, though its point of origin is difficult to ascertain, and various features of the text might point at the influence of traditions of Mari or the Diyala area. According to Witold Tyborowski, it might have been a variant name of a month in the local calendar of Kisurra. The theophoric element Sugallitum can be found in a single name from this city, Amat-Sugallitum.

In Zabalam itself, Hammurabi of Babylon built a temple named Ezikalamma ("house - the life of the land"), as indicated by inscribed bricks found during excavations. References to the goddess of Zabalam also occur in sources from the capital of his kingdom. A priest of Sugallîtum is attested in a text from this city from the late Old Babylonian period, in which he acts as a witness. It has been suggested that his presence in Babylon was the result of the arrival of refugees from Larsa.

After the Old Babylonian period, Zabalam was likely abandoned. However, the archives of the First Sealand dynasty still contain references to offerings made to ^{dI}NANA NIN-SU.GAL, "Inanna-lady-of-Zabalam". According to Manfred Krebernik, a reference to ^{d}Šu-gal-li-tum also occurs in an incantation postdating the Old Babylonian period in an enumeration of various names of Ishtar. In the Canonical Temple List, most likely composed in the Kassite period, cult centers of Inanna of Zabalam (referred to as Supālītum) are listed in a separate short section. They include the Etemennigurru (location unknown; entry 319), the Esusuĝarra ("house where meals are set out"), likely in Uruk (entry 320), the E.AN-kum in an unknown location (entry 321), and the Egigunna in Muru (entry 322). In a lamentation, the Esiguz, "house of goat hair," located in Gu'abba, is associated with her.
