= Addu-duri =

Addu-duri (died c. 1768 BC) was a powerful female official during the reign of King Zimri-Lim, possibly the queen mother, in the ancient city-state of Mari, in what is now Syria.

== Biography ==
Based on the archaeological record, the scholar Bernard Frank Batto classified Addu-duri as a "powerful woman administrator" in Mari, an ancient Semitic city-state in what is now Syria.

During the rule of Zimri-Lim in the 18th century BC, Addu-duri held great influence, and the king frequently relied on her for important projects. While her exact title is unknown, she likely served in an official capacity in Mari, with broad jurisdiction over the entire capital city, particularly its palace and temples. She was involved in both religious and secular affairs, including legal matters such as property disputes. She retained access to her own wealth via owning estates, livestock, and luxury gifts.

Addu-duri resided in the palace, and scholars including Jack Sasson have theorized that she was Zimri-Lim's mother, although Batto had previously concluded that it was unlikely she was a blood relative of the royal family. She died during the height of Zimri-Lim's rule, around the 7th year of his reign.
