= Sippar-Amnanum =

Archaeological site in Iraq

- Tell ed-Der
- Location within Iraq
- 33°05′57″N 44°17′50″E
- Type: settlement
- Periods: Bronze Age, Iron Age
- Location: Baghdad Governorate, Iraq

Site notes
- Excavation dates: 1878-80, 1941, 1968-1988
- Archaeologists: Hormuzd Rassam, Taha Baqir, L. De Meyer, M. H. Gasche
- Condition: Ruined
- Owner: Public
- Public access: Yes

Sippar-Amnanum (also Sippar-Annunitum, Sippar-rabum, Sippar-durum, and Sippar-Anunit ), modern Tell ed-Der (also Teil ed-Der) in Baghdad Governorate, Iraq, was an ancient Near Eastern city about 70 kilometers north of Babylon, 6 kilometers northeast of Sippar and about 26 kilometers southwest of modern Baghdad. Occupation dates back to the days of the Akkadian Empire and later the Ur III period but most of the development was during the Old Babylonian period. Early archaeologists referred to the site as "Der" or Dair". In the late 1800s archaeologists proposed that this was the location of the city of Akkad, later disproved.

== History ==
Sippar-Amnanum was the sister city (or suburb in some eyes) of Sippar. Though occupied from the Akkadian Period, little is known of its history before the Old Babylonian period. Soundings have shown that occupation extends to 4 meters below the surface with the current water table at 2 meters making excavation of earlier occupation difficult. The oldest excavated layer of Level IV, dating from the Ur III period, of which foundations are apparent.

The chief deity of Sippar-Amnanum was Annunitum, a warlike aspect of Ishtar favored by the Akkadians. She is the daughter of Enlil. According to the Sippar Cylinder of Nabonidus the temple Eulmash of Anunitu (Amnanum) was rebuilt by that Neo-Babylonian king. The cylinder also reports that the temple had earlier been rebuilt by Shagarakti-Shuriash (c, 1245–1233 BC, a king of the Kassite dynasty of Babylon (having earlier been rebuilt by Kassite ruler Kurigalzu I), Nabonidus having found one of the original foundation Kassite foundation cylinders.

"For Annunītu, lady of Emaš of Sippar-Annunītu, his lady, Šagarakti-Šuriaš, the shepherd, favorite of Šamaš, beloved of Annunītu, [(did building work on)] Emaš, her beloved temple, the temple that had become dilapidated long ago, which Kurigalzu, son of Kadašman-Ḫarbe, his forefather from bygone days, had made new and also consolidated (but) whose walls through aging had fallen and bowed like a curved staff (…). He raised(?) … He raised(?) … He raised the top of its walls like the mountains. He restored this temple to its place.” For Ištar-Annunītu, his lady, Kurigalzu, governor for Enlil, built Emaš, the old dwelling [place](?) / her beloved [temple] that had become dilapidated a long time ago. [Indeed] he restored it to [its place]. [According to the text of a fo]undation deposit of Emaš of Sippar-Annun[ītu]."

Presumably the temple had been destroyed in the interim by Shutruk-Nakhkhunte of Elam when he destroyed Sippar. There was also a temple of Shamash in Sippar-Amnanum named Edikuda.

Note that there is some confusion on the city's name since Sîn-kāšid, a king of Uruk, refers to himself in an inscription as "King of the Amnanum", where Amnanum is thought to be a tribal group.

== Archaeology ==
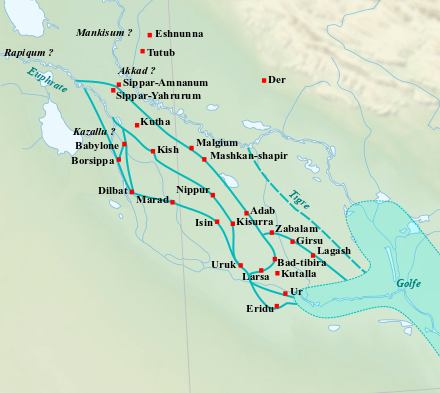
Babylonia at the time of Hammurabi, c. 1792-1750 BC

The site covers around 51 hectares with an east and west tell divided by an ancient canal bed. Sippar-Amnanum was surrounded by a 3 kilometer large defensive wall much of which still remains. Tell ed-Der, along with Sippar, was excavated by Hormuzd Rassam between 1878 and 1880. Most of the tablets ended up in the British Museum. As was often the case in the early days of archaeology, excavation records were not made, particularly find spots. This makes it occasionally difficult to tell which tablets came from Sippar-Amnanum as opposed to Sippar. More Tell ed-Der tablets were purchased from locals by E. A. Wallis Budge while he was in the region after brief attempts to dig there in 1891. In the 1930s the German archaeologists Walter Andrae and Julius Jordan visited the site and produced the first maps.

A sounding was conducted there between 1940 and 1941 by the Directorate General of Antiquities of the Iraqi Government under the direction of Taha Baqir. Among their finds were the archives of Anum-pisha and Iku-pish (dating to the time of Bablonian rulers Sumu-abum and Sumu-la-El). Three hundred broken cuneiform tablets from the Old Babylonian period were found. Since the site is relatively close to Baghdad, it was a popular target for illegal excavations. More recently, Tell ed-Der was excavated in a number of seasons between 1968 and 1988 by the Belgian Archaeological Expedition to Iraq (Comite Belge de Recherches Historiques en Mesopotamie) led by L. De Meyer and M. H. Gasche.

The "House of Ur-Utu" was excavated in the mid 1970s. This residence, of the kalamahhum-priest (lamentation priest) of Annunitum, held around 2500 cuneiform tablets and tablet fragments forming a household archive spanning several centuries. Of these 204 were of Ur-Utu (and his father Inanna-mansum). The destruction of the house by fire helped preserve the tablets. Most of the tablets were contemporary with the reigns of Ammisaduqa and Ammi-ditana of the First Babylonian dynasty. A number of cuneiform tablets from "uncontrolled digging" at Sippar-Amnanum have appeared in various museums, beginning in the late 1800s.

In the dromos of chamber tomb T. 272, four equid legs together with some pig and ox remains were found.

== See also ==
- Cities of the ancient Near East
- Tell (archaeology)
- Short chronology timeline
