= Ishtar of Arbela =

Mesopotamian goddess of the city of Arbela and patroness of the Neo-Assyrian king

- Tutelary goddess of Arbela, protectress of the king, prophetic goddess
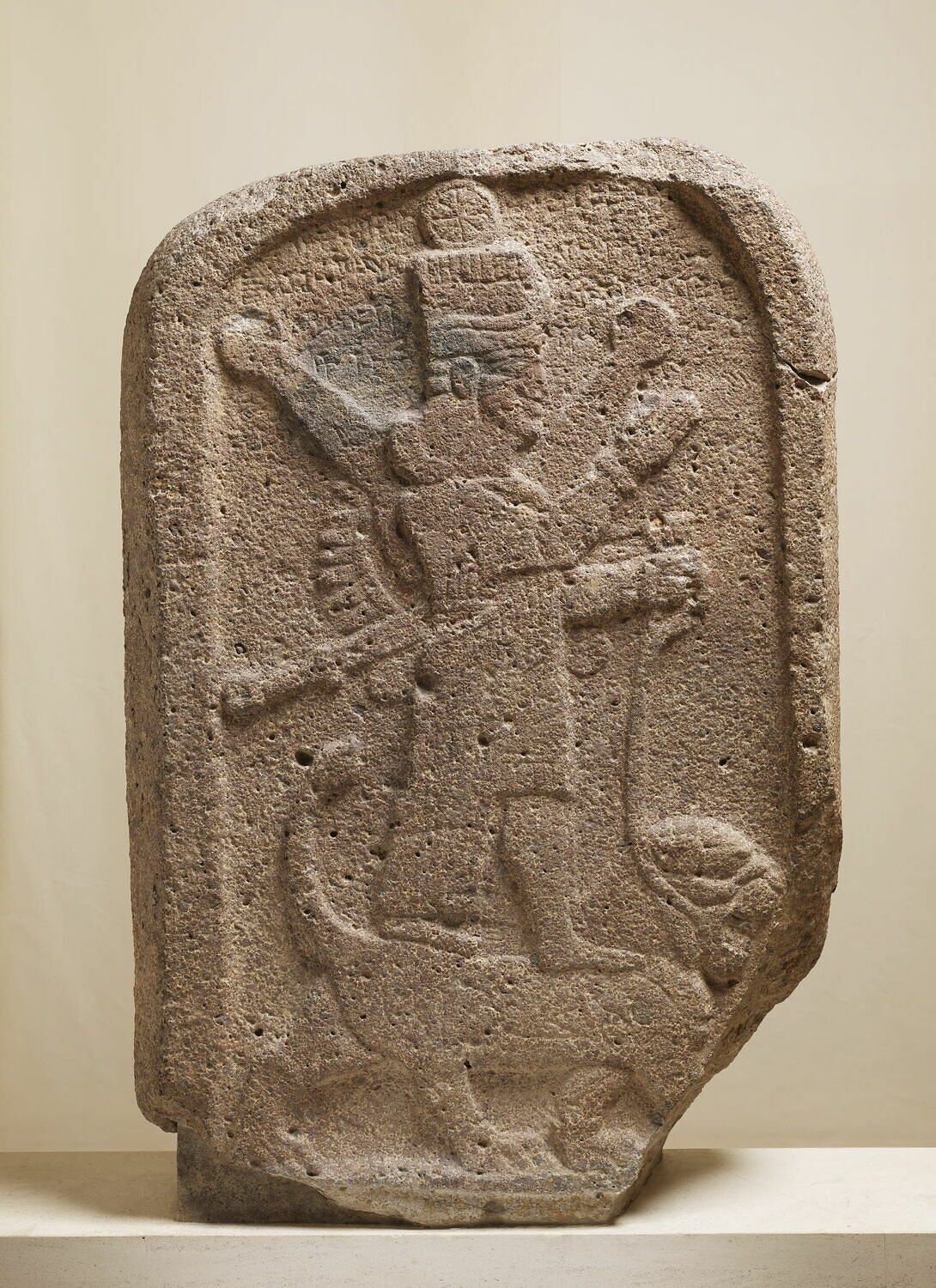
- 8th century BCE stele from Til Barsip depicting Ishtar of Arbela standing on a lion.
- Major cult center: Arbela

Ishtar of Arbela or the Lady of Arbela (Akkadian: ^{d}bēlat(gašan)-^{uru}arba-il) was a prominent goddess of the Neo-Assyrian Empire. She was the tutelary goddess of the city of Arbela (or Arbail, modern Erbil) as well as a patron goddess of the king. She was clearly distinct from other 'Ishtar' goddesses in religious worship. For example, in the city of Assur, she had a shrine separate from Ishtar of Assur, and Ishtar of Nineveh had a separate cult from either deity in Assur as well as a presence in Arbela. Similarly, they are usually distinguished from each other in hymns, prophetic texts, and treaties. In his Hymn to the Ištars of Nineveh and Arbela, King Ashurbanipal refers to the pair as 'my Ishtars' and uses plural language throughout, as well as ascribing them different functions in supporting the king. However, some poetic and prophetic texts appear to not draw sharp lines between their identities and refer to an unspecified "Ishtar".

== Iconography ==
In an account of a nocturnal vision of Ishtar of Arbela in the annals of Ashurbanipal, the goddess is described as carrying weapons: "Ištar who dwells in Arbail came in. She had quivers hanging left and right and held a bow in her arm and a sharp sword drawn for doing battle". In the Hymn to Arbail, she is described as being seated on a lion with lions crouching below her and the kings of all lands cowering around her. These descriptions accord with the image depicted on the dedicatory Stele from Til Barsip shown above, where she stands upon a lion and is equipped with a sword and two quivers. There is a star on her headdress, possibly due to a connection with the planet Venus, and a circle with radiating lines is visible behind her to represent her divine radiance.

== Worship ==
=== Second Millennium BCE ===
The earliest known appearance of the epithet 'Lady of Arbela' comes from a fourteenth century BCE ritual text found at Nuzi. A reference to the Egašankalamma temple has survived from the reign of Shalmaneser I (1273-1244 BCE), who describes how he has rebuilt this temple and its ziggurat for the 'goddess Ištar, mistress of the city Arbail, my mistress' along with other temples through the empire. He claims that he rebuilt these 'cult-centres (and) shrines better than previously', implying that the temple already existed prior to this date. Given that the city probably never existed without a temple and its name is known from third millennium BCE texts from Ebla and the Ur III period, her cult may have existed in the third millennium BCE as well. The king of Arbela defeated by Dadusha of Eshnunna, an event celebrated on the Dadusha Stele, had the theophoric name Būnu-Ištar. Cultic texts from the 12th century BCE refer to clothing and sacrifices for the temple, and a bronze statue found at Lake Urmia for King Aššur-Dan (1178-1133 BCE) bears the following inscription:

To the goddess Ištar, the great mistress who dwells in Egašankalamma, mistress of Arbail, [his] mistress: For the life of Aššur-dān, king of [Assyria], his lord, Šamšī-bēl, temple scribe, son of Nergal-nadin-ahi (who was) also scribe, for his life, his well-being, and the well-being of his eldest son, dedicated and devoted (this) copper statue weighing x minas. The name of this statue is: 'O goddess Ištar, to you my ear (is directed)!'

Also from the reign of Aššur-Dan, administrative texts refer to sheep being made ready for the nuggat ippê sacrifice to Ishtar of Arbela, and a delivery of cultic clothing for the goddess is mentioned in a text from the reign of Enlil-kudurri-uṣur (c. 1196–1192 BCE).

=== First Millennium BCE ===
Ishtar of Arbela attained her highest prominence in the first millennium BCE. A shrine was built at Milqia, near Arbela, where Shalmaneser III (859-824 BCE) reported celebrating the akitu festival in her honour. While letters suggest that the city of Arbela and Ishtar's temple within it were poorly maintained during the reign of Sargon II (722-705 BCE), the subsequent Sargonid kings considered her one of their principal supporters and invested in her worship and her city. Three watercourses were built to supply Arbela with water during the reign of Sennacherib, who described the city as "the dwelling of the goddess Ištar, the exalted lady". Esarhaddon described the extravagant renovations he made to the temple including silver and gold overlays, and Ashurbanipal also described renovations he had made and the assiduous care he took to support the temple's activities (RINAP Ashurbanipal 5 185:4, RINAP Ashurbanipal 7 v 98–106). Ishtar of Arbela was one of the gods listed in Esarhaddon's accession treaty, succession treaty, and his treaty with king Baal of Tyre as their divine guarantor.

Ashurbanipal's victorious campaign against king Teuman of Elam began with an act of worship at the temple of Ishtar in Arbela. In the Prism B version of his annals, Ishtar of Arbela is the driver of the narrative and Ashurbanipal's unswaying supporter. She deprives Teuman of his reason so that he wishes to fight against the Assyrian king. Ashurbanipal goes to her temple, bows before her, and weeps as he invokes the goddess:

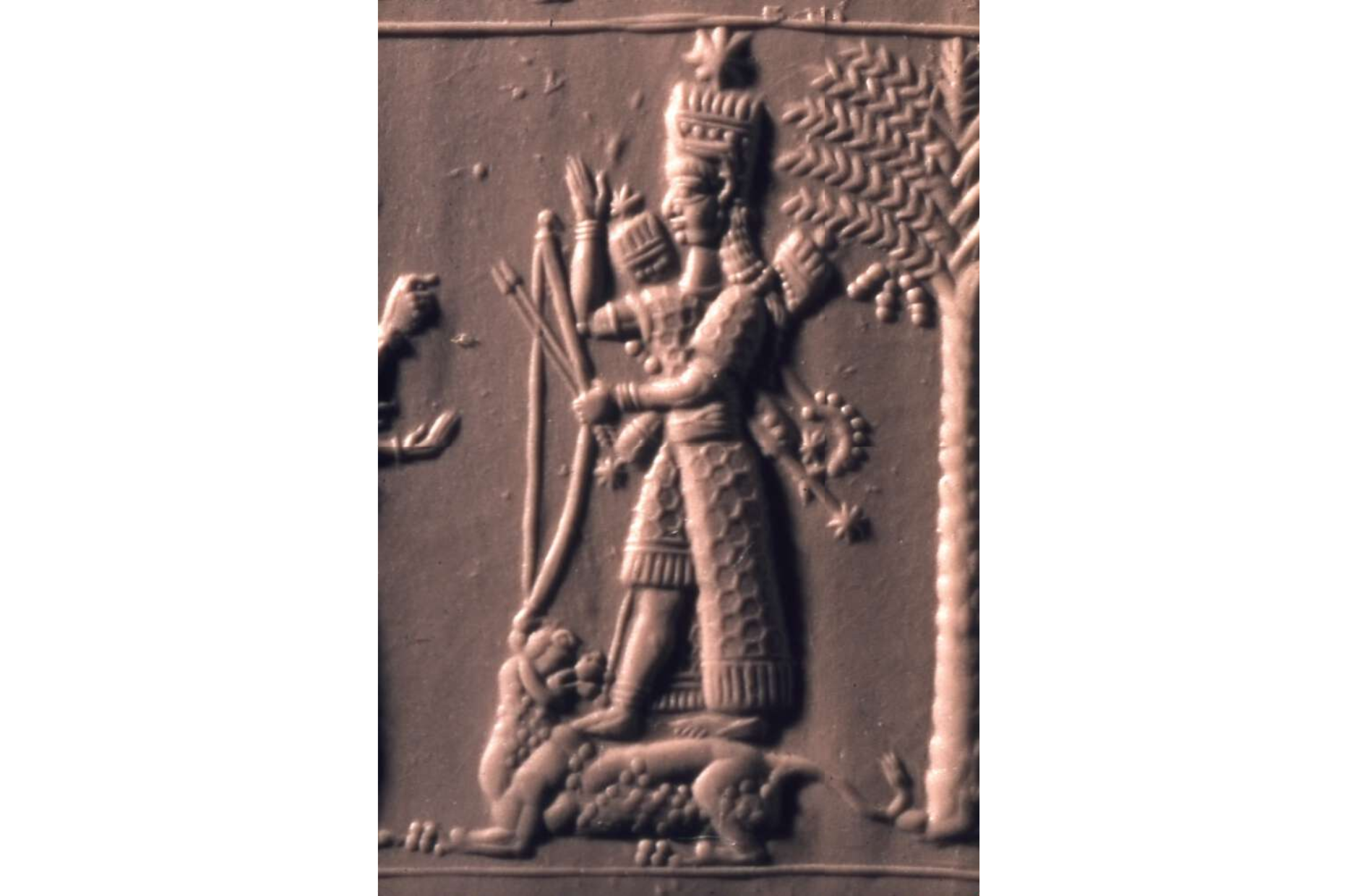
Ishtar of Arbela wielding a bow and standing on a lion on a Neo-Assyrian cylinder seal from the late 8th century BCE.

O Lady of Arbail, I am Ashurbanipal, king of Assyria, the creation of your hands, whom Aššur king of the gods thy father desired and whose name he called to restore the sanctuaries of Assyria and renew their rites, to guard their secrets and to make their hearts glad. I have sought out your sanctuary and come to worship your divinity. Now this Teuman king of Elam who does not value the gods is setting in motion his whole military in order to make war on my forces. O thou Lady of Ladies, goddess of war, lady of battle, who gives counsel to the great gods her fathers, who spoke favourably before Aššur, the father who begot you, (so that) by the lifting of his pure eyes he chose me to be king: because Teuman king of Elam who has rebelled against Aššur king of the gods, thy father, has [withheld his] tribute, mustered his troops, prepared himself for battle and sharpened his weapons in order to march on Assyria: may you, heroic one among the gods, in the midst of battle drive him away like a pack animal! Call up against him a tempest and an evil wind!

The goddess then appears to one of Ashurbanipal's seers in a nocturnal vision, fully armed, and comforts Ashurbanipal before turning her rage on Teuman. Teuman was defeated at the Battle of Ulai. When the Assyrian forces returned from their campaign, they paraded Teuman and his wife in neck-stocks before Mulissu and Ishtar of Arbela before beheading the Elamite king.

When Ashurbanipal stayed in the city of Arbela, he celebrated festivals of the goddess in the months of Abu (V, Jul/Aug) and Addaru (XII, Feb/Mar). A text known as the "Rites of Egašankalamma" describes how the temple's rites were like those performed in Nippur. The text describes how particular ceremonial actions relate to mythological events in a ritual narrative. The narrative of ritual begins with Ishtar weeping at the death of Ishtaran. Bēl casts Ea down into the Abzu, Nabu slays the monster Anzû, Bēl defeats Anu and cuts off his head, and a god descends into and then returns from the underworld.

Administrative texts from the 7th century refer to loans of silver made by merchants associated with the temple of Ishtar of Arbela. Contracts regarding the sale of land or slaves included 'penalty clauses' where a party in breach of contract would have to pay a fine to the temple in addition to returning money to its owner tenfold.

Sources on Ishtar of Arbela during the Neo-Babylonian and Achaemenid periods are limited to a single administrative text from the reign of Cyrus the Great, found in Sippar. It mentions ten bronze rings of the 'Lady of Arbail' being moved into a storehouse in the temple of Shamash.

=== First Millennium CE ===
Assyriologist Dr. Stephanie Dalley has suggested that the priesthood of Ishtar of Arbela continued until at least the 4th century CE. She connects the goddess Iššar-Bel known from inscriptions and theophoric names at Hatra in the 2nd century CE with Ishtar of Arbela on the grounds of Aramaic texts that demonstrate that the Assyrians pronounced Ishtar as Iššar and her association with the Akitu festival. Further, according to the hagiographical text known as the Acts of Aithalaha the (Pagan) Priest and Hafsai the Deacon, a priest of 'Sharbel-of-Arbela' who had recently converted to Christianity was martyred in the year 355 during the persecutions of Sasanian king Shapur II. However, Dr. Joel Walker cautions against relying on this isolated martyr narrative, especially given that it is a fictional work modelled on older Edessan martyriological literature. He notes that so far we have no reliable evidence of the cult of Ishtar of Arbela from after the Achaemenid period onwards, a situation which may change with further archaeology.

== Temples ==
The main temple of Ishtar of Arbela was the Egašankalamma (é.gašan.kalam.ma or bēt šarrat māti, "House of the Queen of the Land"). The town of Milqia, near Arbela, was home to a temple called the "Palace of the Steppe" and an Akitu-house of Ishtar. The celebrations would begin in Arbela, and then the goddess's cultic image would be transported to Milqia. From here the Akitu procession would travel to Baltil in the city of Assur, where the king would ceremonially enter her presence. The cultic image would also travel to Milqia during military campaigns, and while located here the goddess was also called by the name 'Šatru'. Victory festivals would be celebrated here when the king returned.

== Role in Prophecy ==
While prophecies from other deities survive from the Neo-Assyrian period, those relating to Ishtar of Arbela are the most numerous, making up 7 of the 15 prophets known. As the divine nurse of the king, she was tied to legitimacy and succession, which was a major concern for kings such as Esarhaddon and Ashurbanipal whose succession was contested (SAA 9 1.6). She also assured his personal safety (SAA 9 1.10) As a goddess of war, she gave the king of victory over his enemies on campaign, as in SAA 9 1.1 i 6′–24′:

What wind attacked you? Whose wing have I not broken? Like a ripe apple, your enemies will constantly roll down before your feet. I am the Great Lady, I am Ištar of Arbela who throws your enemies before your feet. I will flay your enemies and deliver them up to you. I am Ištar of Arbela, I go before you and behind you. Fear not! You are paralysed, but in the midst of woe I will rise and sit down (beside you).

In addition to providing encouragement to the king and making promises of future success, prophets also relayed accounts of divine intercession made by Ishtar of Arbela to the divine assembly, which was led by the supreme god Aššur. Professor Martti Nissinen has suggested that such divine gatherings were not solely abstract events, but were performed ceremonially by prophets. He support this with accounts of the expenditures required for a gathering of divine council including numerous prophetesses in a list of festivals.

== Associations with other deities ==
The Hymn to the City of Arbela presents the city of Arbela as a religious centre and refers to it as "the city of the temple of jubilation" and "gate of heaven". It associates Ishtar of Arbela with two other prominent goddesses, Nanaya and Irnina. Hymns such as Ashurbanipal's Hymn to the Ištars of Nineveh and Arbela connect her with Ishtar of Nineveh. As joint protectors of the king, Ishtar of Arbela and Ishtar of Nineveh often appear together in texts and may speak as one in prophecy, such as in SAA 9 2.4.

Some references to familial relationships of Ishtar of Arbela appear in texts. In Prism B of the annals of Ashurbanipal, Ishtar of Arbela intercedes with Aššur, the "father who made [her]", on the king's behalf. The ritual text known as the "Rites of Egašankalamma" describes Ishtaran as Ishtar of Arbela's brother.
