= Mes-sanga-Unug =

Mesopotamian god

- Warrior god
- Major cult center: Uruk, Babylon

Genealogy
- Spouse: Ningu'esiraka

Mes-sanga-Unug (^{d}MES.SANGA.UNUG^{ki}; also read Pisangunug) was a Mesopotamian god closely associated with the city of Uruk, and especially with one of its districts, Kullaba. He was regarded as a warrior deity. In early sources he was described as the "great ensi of Inanna," but later on he was seemingly associated with Anu instead. He belonged to the earliest pantheon of Uruk, though he ceased to be worshiped there in the Ur III period, and the attestations in documents from the reign of the Seleucids are assumed to be a result of a late reintroduction. He was also venerated in Babylon, where he had two temples. Further attestations from outside Uruk come from various god lists.

== Name ==
Reading the name of the discussed deity is a matter of scholarly debate. It was written in cuneiform as ^{d}MES.SANGA.UNUG^{ki} in early sources, while in the first millennium BCE as ^{d}MES.SAG.UNUG_{ki} or ^{d}MES✕A.SAG.UNUG^{ki}. Mes-sanga-Unug is the version employed by Manfred Krebernik in the corresponding entry in Reallexikon der Assyriologie und Vorderasiatischen Archäologie. However, he accepts the possibility that the sign MES should be read as pisan. Interpreting it as ^{d}Pisan_{2/x}^{saĝ/sanga}-Unug^{ki} has been suggested by Wilfred G. Lambert, but according to Jeremiah Peterson it is not plausible, and the alternative is supported by a gloss in an Assyrian copy of the god list An = Anum (YBC 2401, tablet 5, line 20). He accordingly renders it as ^{d}Mes-sanga-Unug^{ki}-ga. However, he also notes it is plausible the theonym was not fully understood in the Old Babylonian period already. The element mes-sanga is an Early Dynastic term designating a profession, which makes it possible to translate the name as "the mes-sanga of Uruk." Peterson notes that this further supports the reading of the name starting with m rather than p, as multiple deities whose names are a combination of a profession name and the toponym Unug (Uruk) occur in Early Dynastic texts. However, the reading Pisangunug can still be found in Assyriological publications as recent as 2018.

Various variant renderings of the name can be found in literature. For example, Julia M. Asher-Greve renders it as Pisaĝ-Unug. and Walther Sallaberger as Messaĝĝa’unu(g). Paul-Alain Beaulieu due to the uncertain reading of the name refers to the god as "Pi/Mesangunuk."

== Character ==
Mes-sanga-Unug was primarily associated with the city of Uruk, and especially with one of its districts, Kullaba. A god list from the Middle Assyrian period refers to him as the "herald of Kullaba" (nímgir kul.aba_{4}^{ki}.ke_{4}). This epithet is also attested in the incantation series Udug Hul and in a liturgic text which also provides the Akkadian explanation na-gi-ri kul-la-bi. A so-called "list of divine mayors" from the Nippur Compendium refers to him as "the Bēl-āliya of Kullaba." Multiple deities bearing the title of Bēl-āliya (conventionally translated as "mayor") of a specific city are known. According to Andrew R. George, in Mes-sanga-Unug's case this role is analogous to that of the "herald" of the same location.

An Early Dynastic riddle from Lagash refers to him as the "great ensi of Inanna." However, it is possible that in the Seleucid period he was viewed as a servant of Anu, which might indicate that a shift in his affiliation occurred over time. He might have functioned as a divine guardian of the temple complex Bīt Rēš.

It is presumed that Mes-sanga-Unug was a warrior god. In some cases, he might have functioned as a local manifestation of Nergal or Ninurta. Paul-Alain Beaulieu proposed in 1993 that he is listed among Ninurta's alternate names in a syncretistic section in the Standard Babylonian edition of the Anzû myth, though at the time most translators, for example Stephanie Dalley and Benjamin R. Foster, favored restoring the damaged passage as an epithet, "warrior of Uruk" (UR.SAG UNUG^{ki}), rather than a theonym. In a more recent publication Julia Krul notes that this proposal subsequently found a degree of support, and Foster in 2005 retranslated the Anzû passage in accordance with it. Mes-sanga-Unug's association with Nergal is attested in two compositions treating him as a hypostasis of this god.

According to Manfred Krebernik, Mes-sanga-Unug's placement in the Nippur god list might indicate he could be understood as a divine judge as well.

== Worship ==
=== Uruk ===
Mes-sanga-Unug was one of the members of the earliest form of the pantheon of Uruk, which also included Inanna (in various manifestations), her attendant Ninshubur, the deified hero Gilgamesh and his parents Ninsun and Lugalbanda, the goddesses Ninirigal and Ningirima, as well as Anu, at the time a deity of limited importance. Lugalzagesi, an Early Dynastic king of this city, used the title "man (lu_{2}) of Mes-sanga-Unug." A cylinder seal from the Old Akkadian period mentions an en priestess in Mes-sanga-Unug's service. She bore the name Ninessa, and the inscription specifies she was a daughter of a certain Lugal-TAR. Despite this reference to the existence of clergy of Mes-sanga-Unug, no known texts from Uruk from any period mention any houses of worship dedicated to him.

According to Walther Sallaberger, Mes-sanga-Unug already ceased to be worshiped in Uruk in the Ur III period. However, Paul-Alain Beaulieu tentatively suggests that his absence from the Neo-Babylonian corpus of texts from this city might simply indicate that he was venerated in a temple unrelated to the Eanna complex. He also proposes the deity Bēl-āliya attested in a handful of documents might correspond to him. Regardless of these theories, as of 2018 it remained the consensus that no attestations of him from this period are known.

Mes-sanga-Unug was reintroduced to the pantheon of Uruk in the Seleucid period alongside Ninirigal, according to Julia Krul presumably due to the antiquity of the local tradition pertaining to them. He became one of the deities of the Bīt Rēš, "head temple," a new temple complex dedicated to Anu and Antu built in this period. In ritual texts he commonly appears among deities worshiped inside the complex as Anu's servants, such as Papsukkal, Isimud, Nuska and Kusu. For example, references to a procession around the Bīt Rēš involving a deified torch, Mes-sanga-Unug, Papsukkal, Isimud and Nuska are known. In a text dealing with the akitu festival, he is listed alongside various other deities, including Ninsun and Lugalbanda. Despite his presence in ritual texts, no theophoric names invoking him are known.

=== Other attestations ===
Early Dynastic attestations of Mes-sanga-Unug from outside Uruk include the god lists from Shuruppak and Abu Salabikh. He is also mentioned in the Zame Hymns, according to which he was the resident of a location referred to as ki-en-gi, according to Walther Sallaberger in this context to be understood as Uruk, rather than Sumer as a whole, in contrast with later texts.

Mes-sanga-Unug is also attested in the Weidner god list, where he follows Ningirsu and Saĝkud and precedes Bau. In the trilingual version from Ugarit, he corresponds to Milkunni in the Hurrian column and Gaṯaru in the Ugaritic one, though it has been called into question if this text accurately reflects the religious traditions of the latter two cultures. In the Old Babylonian Nippur god list he is placed before Idlurugu. In An = Anum he appears alongside a goddess glossed as his wife, Ningu'esiraka ("lady of the roadside").

In the first millennium BCE, Mes-sanga-Unug was worshiped in Babylon. He was associated with the district of Kullaba, presumably named after that located in Uruk. In one case, one of his temples is paired with that of Lugalbanda, located in the same part of the city also due to this figure's origin in Uruk. On an exercise tablet from Babylon he appears alongside Nanaya, Gazbaba, Kanisurra and other deities associated with the city of Uruk to varying degrees. Two houses of worship dedicated to him are known from textual sources, the E-esir-kalamma and the E-ur-gubba. The ceremonial Sumerian name of the former, which was located in the west of the city, means "house of the street of the land," while that of the latter, located in the east - "house, established foundation".
