= Tadmuštum =

Mesopotamian goddess

- Goddess associated with the underworld
- Major cult center: Kutha

Genealogy
- Parents: Nergal (father)
- Spouse: Šubula

Tadmuštum or Dadamušda was a Mesopotamian goddess associated with the underworld. She was regarded as the daughter of Nergal, and in known texts often appears in association with his main cult center, Kutha.

== Name ==
Attested spellings of Tadmuštum's name in cuneiform include ^{d}Tá-ad-muš-tum (in an offering list from the Ur III period), ^{d}Tá-ad-mu-uš-tum (in the god list An = Anum), ^{d}Tá-da-muš-da (in a late list of dyads of goddesses), ^{d}Ta-ad-muš-tum (in the text Silbenvokabular A), and according to Manfred Krebernik possibly ^{d}Taš-mu-uš-tum (in the Nippur god list). However, according to Jeremiah Peterson the last writing, which he renders as ^{d}UR-mu-uš-(t)um, stands for the deity ^{d}UR-ma-šum (or ^{d}UR-maš), the sukkal of Gula known from the Weidner god list and An = Anum. He notes only in a single exemplar the name ends in the Akkadian feminine suffix, -tum.

It is presumed that the theonym Tadmuštum originates in a Semitic language, though its precise etymology is uncertain, with possible cognates including Akkadian dāmasu ("to humble") and dāmašu (interrogative form of "cover up"), as well as Geʽez damasu ("to abolish," "to destroy" or "to hide").

== Associations with other deities ==
According to the god list An = Anum (tablet VI, line 15), Tadmuštum was the daughter of Nergal, the god of the underworld. Another deity of similar character, Šubula, was regarded as her husband according to the same source. Like both of these deities, she was also associated with the underworld herself.

Manfred Krebernik proposes an etymological connection existed between the names of Tadmuštum and the Ugaritic goddess Dadmiš, who occurs in offering lists from this city alongside Resheph.

== Attestations ==
The oldest available attestations of Tadmuštum come from the Ur III period. She was already regarded as one of the deities of Kutha in this period. In one of the published offering lists, she appears alongside deities such as Laṣ and Šubula.

The so-called Silbenvokabular A explains the signs [AŠ].NI-[AŠ].UR first as the primordial par Enki-Ninki, and then as Zarriqum (an underworld god from the circle of Nergal, possibly deification of an official bearing the same name) and Tadmuštum.

A late late school text from Babylon, which lists dyads of goddesses, labels Tadmuštum ("Dadamušda") and Belet-ili as the "daughters of E-Meslam," the main temple of Nergal located in Kutha. The other pairs listed in include the daughters of Esagil from Babylon (Ṣilluš-ṭāb and Katunna), the daughters of Ezida from Borsippa (Gazbaba and Kanisurra), daughters of Edubba from Kish (Iqbi-damiq and Ḫussinni), daughters of Ebabbar from Sippar (Mami and Ninegina), daughters of E-ibbi-Ani from Dilbat (Ipte-bīta and Bēlet-Eanni), and daughters of E-Ningublaga (Mannu-šāninšu and Larsam-iti according to Joan Goodnick Westenholz, Mannu-šāninšu and Urkitum according to Manfred Krebernik). Collectively, these deities are referred to as "Divine Daughters" in Assyriology. In addition to these known from the list, further pairs are attested in texts from Uruk, Nippur, Eridu and Arbela. Based on the well attested roles of the daughters of Esagil and Ezida as hairdressers of corresponding major goddesses, respectively Zarpanitum and Nanaya, Andrew R. George suggests that the other Divine Daughters were also believed to function as members of the households of major deities who were responsible for various menial tasks.
