= Iqbi-damiq =

Mesopotamian goddess

- Sukkal of Niĝgina
- Major cult center: Kish, Assur

Genealogy
- Parents: possibly Zababa and Šarrat-Kiš
- Siblings: possibly Ḫussinni

Iqbi-damiq was a Mesopotamian goddess who was regarded as one of the "Daughters of Edubba", and was worshiped in Kish for this role. According to the god list An = Anum she also functioned as the sukkal (attendant deity) of Niĝgina. She is mentioned in texts of Assur and Babylon. An illness named after her, the "hand of Iqbi-damiq," is known from texts focused on medicine and omens.

== Name ==
Wilfred G. Lambert assumed Iqbi-damiq was a male deity, and accordingly translated the name as "He spoke: it was pleasant", but in a more recent publication Andrew R. George translates it as "She said 'it is fine!'" and notes that she was regarded as a member of a duo referred to as the Daughters of Edubba.

Manfred Krebernik notes the name is structurally similar to that of Qibî-dumqī ("Speak my hail"). John MacGinnis suggests the two were simply variant names of the same deity. Krebernik only assumes that the writing ^{d}DUG4-bi-SIG_{5} might be read as either of these names. Qibî-dumqī is attested in texts dealing with deities worshiped in Assur and Arbela, while in a late Babylonian hymn she is treated as a name of Ishtar.

== Associations with other deities ==
As one of the Daughters of Edubba, Iqbi-damiq was paired with Ḫussinni, whose name can be translated as "Remember me!" Other similar pairs of goddesses referred to as the "daughters" of a specific temple are listed alongside them on a late tablet found in the temple of Nabu in Babylon, and include the Daughters of Esagil (Ṣilluš-ṭāb and Katunna), Daughters of Ezida (Gazbaba and Kanisurra), Daughters of Emeslam (Dadamušda and Bēlet-ilī), Daughters of Ebabbar (Mami and Ninegina), Daughters of E-ibbi-Ani (Ipte-bīta and Bēlet-Eanni), and Daughters of E-Ningublaga (Mannu-šāninšu and Larsam-iti). According to Andrew R. George, goddesses belonging to this category most likely fulfilled menial roles in the households of corresponding major deities, as indicated by the fact that the pairs from Esagil and Ezida were the hairdressers of Zarpanit and Nanaya respectively. Edubba (Sumerian: "storage house") was ta temple of the god Zababa located in Kish. Frans Wiggermann suggests that Iqbi-damiq and Ḫussinni might have been viewed as the daughters of this god and Šarrat-Kiš ("Queen of Kish"). The latter deity might be identical to Bau, though evidence is ambiguous.

Iqbi-damiq also functioned as the sukkal (divine "vizier") of Niĝgina (Kittum), a daughter and sukkal of the sun god Utu who was regarded as the personification of truth. However, in his commentary of the line of the god list An = Anum attesting this connection, Richard L. Litke states that a sukkal having a sukkal of their own should be considered an anomaly.

== Worship ==
Multiple Assyrian sources indicate that a chapel of Iqbi-damiq, Ešagaerra, "house which weeps for the wronged", existed in the temple of Belet-ekalli in Assur. The latter bore the name Ekinam, "house, place of destinies". In a lipšur litany Iqbi-damiq is listed as a denizen of Egalmaḫ, the temple of Gula in Babylon. In a late ritual text, she is listed as one of the fifteen deities worshiped in Edubba in Kish.

Iqbi-damiq is also attested in the incantation series Šurpu. However, in some of the known copies Qibî-dumqī appears in the same passage instead.

== Hand of Iqbi-damiq ==
A disease known as the "hand of Iqbi-damiq" is also attested in ancient Mesopotamian sources. An Assyrian text, SAA IV 190, states that through extispicy, Shamash revealed that an illness Naqi'a, the mother of Esarhaddon, was suffering from was the hand of Iqbi-damiq. While an alternate translation of the hand of Iqbi-damiq refers to the involvement of this deity in divination in this context has also been suggested, it is regarded as less plausible. A subsequent passage states further divination rituals were performed to learn if offering of sheep and oxen would result in recovery.

In a medical text, the hand of Iqbi-damiq is listed next to other similarly named afflictions: the "hand of Nanaya from Uruk", "hand of Kanisurra" and "hand of Qibi-dumqi". Many further examples of "hands" of specific deities are known from medical treatises and omen texts, with as many as thirty-five individual ones known as of 2018. While the majority of them are causes of diseases, injuries or accidents, a few are listed as good omens, for example "hand of Ishtar".
