= Išartu =

Mesopotamian goddess personifying righteousness

- Divine personification of righteousness
- Major cult center: Mari

Genealogy
- Spouse: Mīšaru

Išartu was a Mesopotamian goddess regarded as the divine hypostasis of righteousness. She was closely associated with a deity of similar character, Mīšaru, and in the god list An = Anum they are described as a couple. Evidence of the worship of Išartu includes early Akkadian theophoric names, offering lists from Mari and late religious texts from Uruk.

== Character ==
Išartu functioned as the divine hypostasis of righteousness. Julia Krul describes her as the feminine equivalent of Mīšaru. Volkert Haas assumed that in Mariote tradition they were regarded as twins. In the god list An = Anum (tablet III, line 247) she is described as his spouse. Manfred Krebernik argues that the pair represented the concept of law and order.

Like Mīšaru, Išartu belonged to the circle of deities associated with Adad. Paul-Alain Beaulieu notes that both of them show affinity with another deity from this group, Uṣur-amāssu, and presumes the latter's own association with justice was influenced by this. Two known instances of the word išartu being used as an epithet of Shala, a balag composition and an eršaḫunga prayer, are presumed to be related to Išartu's presence in Adad s circle too.

Išartu should not be confused with the theonym ^{d}I-šìr-tu_{4} known from a single late god list, which is instead assumed to mean "the ten gods."

== Worship ==
The deity Išar, presumed to be identical with Išartu, first appears in Old Akkadian theophoric names. She was worshiped in Bad-tibira during the reign of Shu-Sin of the Third Dynasty of Ur and appears in an offering list from Mari (ARM 24 263) alongside Mišaru. In the latter city both forms of the name were used, with the longer one attested in the offering list ARM 23 264, between Dagan and Yakrub-El. A possible reference to her is also present in the Old Babylonian god list from Isin, but the signs are damaged and the name cannot be restored with certainty.

According to Daniel Schwemer, the only source of evidence regarding the worship of Išartu in later periods are documents from Uruk. She was a member of the local pantheon in the Seleucid period, but she is not attested in earlier sources from this city. She is one of the deities mentioned in a description of a parade accompanying Ishtar during the akitu celebrations; among other participants are chiefly figures typically associated with this goddess or the city of Uruk, such as Nanaya, Ninsianna, Ninigizibara or Ninmeurur. Despite her presence in religious texts, Išartu is not attested in legal formulas or theophoric names from the late Uruk text corpus.
