= Kanisurra =

Mesopotamian goddess

- Goddess associated with love
- Member of the court of Nanaya
- Major cult center: Uruk

Kanisurra (also Gansurra, Ganisurra) was a Mesopotamian goddess who belonged to the entourage of Nanaya. Much about her character remains poorly understood, though it is known she was associated with love. Her name might be derived from the word ganzer, referring to the underworld or to its entrance. In addition to Nanaya, she could be associated with deities such as Gazbaba, Išḫara and Uṣur-amāssu. She is first attested in sources from Uruk from the Ur III period, and continued to be worshiped in this city as late as in the Seleucid period.

== Name and character ==
The character and functions of Kanisurra are unclear. Her best attested characteristic is her association with Nanaya. Both of them belonged to a group of female deities invoked in love and potency incantations, which also included Ishtar, Išḫara and Gazbaba. Some of these texts use formulas such as "at the command of Kanisurra and Išḫara, patron goddess of love" or "at the command of Kanisurra and Išḫara, patroness of sex."

Paul-Alain Beaulieu proposes that Kanisurra's name might represent an Akkadian or otherwise non-standard pronunciation of the Sumerian ganzer, a name of the underworld or specifically of its entrance, as a lexical text from Old Babylonian Nippur attests that kanisurra was one of the readings of the logogram IGI.KUR.ZA, which corresponded to this term. According to Beaulieu, early forms of Kanisurra's name, Gansura and Ganisurra, could be explained as intermediate stages between ganzer and the standard spelling of the theonym in the Old Babylonian period and later. The etymology of ganzer is uncertain, though it has been proposed that it can be explained as the phrase "let me destroy him." Dina Katz considers this proposal unlikely, and suggests it might have originated in a substrate language instead. She also notes ganzer occurs rarely in literary texts, and is best known from lexical lists. Based on the possible etymology of the name, Beaulieu proposes that Kanisurra was a deified part of the underworld in origin. A different proposal is that she was originally a hypostasis of Inanna, and represented the time when Venus is not visible on the sky.

Kanisurra could be referred with the epithet bēlet kaššāpāti, "lady of the sorceresses." This title appears in one Maqlû incantation, and in another similar text from outside this corpus.

An illness called the "hand of Kanisurra" is attested in a medical text alongside "hand of Nanaya," "hand of Iqbi-damiq" and "hand of Qibi-dumqi."

== Associations with other deities ==
Two late texts, a theological explanatory tablet and a liturgic calendar, address Kanisurra and Gazbaba as "Daughters of Ezida," the temple of Nabu in Borsippa, and additionally identifies them as Nanaya's hairdressers. Most pairs of deities referred to this way are known from northern Babylonia. In addition to Daughters of Ezida, known pairs were associated with Esagil in Babylon (Katunna and Silluš-tab), Emeslam in Kutha (Tadmushtum, labeled as a daughter of Nergal in the god list An = Anum, and Belet-ili), Edubba in Kish (Iqbi-damiq, whose name means "she said 'it is fine!'," and Ḫussinni, "Remember me!"), Ebabbar in Sippar (Mami and Ninegina), E-ibbi-Anum in Dilbat (Ipte-bita and Belet-eanni), and with an unnamed temple of Ningublaga (Mannu-šanišu and Larsam-iti). Further nameless examples of pairs of such "daughters" are known from Uruk, Nippur and Eridu, as well as Arbela in Assyria. Based on the fact that daughters of Esagil and of Ezida are identified as members of courts of Zarpanit and Nanaya respectively, specifically as their hairdressers, Andrew R. George proposes that these pairs of goddesses were imagined as maidservants in the household of the major deity or deities of the temple they were associated with.

It is commonly assumed Kanisurra was a daughter of Nanaya. However, as remarked by Gioele Zisa in a recent publication, as of 2021 there is no direct evidence in favor of this view. In known copies of an explanatory version of the Weidner god list, the line explaining whose daughter Kanisurra was regarded as is not fully preserved.

Another deity associated with Kanisurra was Uṣur-amāssu, who appears alongside her in an account of a cultic journey of Nanaya to Kish, and like her was associated with the latter goddess as well as Ishtar. Walther Sallaberger suggests that Uṣur-amāssu functioned as an alternate name of Kanisurra in the first millennium BCE, while Jeremy Black and Anthony Green assume she was her Akkadian counterpart.

In a trilingual edition of the Weidner god list from Ugarit, Kanisurra is explained as Kanizuran in Hurrian and Lēlu in Ugaritic. However, the value of this document as a source of information about religious beliefs of inhabitants of Ugarit, both Ugaritic and Hurrian, has been questioned, as many entries are simply phonetic renderings of Mesopotamian theonyms which do not occur elsewhere.

== Worship ==
Oldest attestations of Kanisurra come from Uruk from the Ur III period. Walther Sallaberger argues that in the light of presently available evidence it can be assumed that similarly to Inanna and Nanaya she belonged to the trio of central goddesses celebrated during various festivals held in this city. He argues that the presence of many goddesses connected to Inanna in the local pantheon might have been related to the presence of the queens of the Third Dynasty of Ur in Uruk. She received offerings during the funerary rites of Shu-Sin, which might be tied to her proposed role as a deity with underworld connections. In an offering list from the reign of the same king, she appears alongside Geshtinanna.

In the Old Babylonian period, during the reign of Sîn-gāmil, An-am built a temple of Kanisurra, most likely in Uruk. While it is known that he reigned as a king of Uruk himself, the inscription mentioning this construction project comes from before his ascent to the throne. Kanisurra is addressed as Nin-Iturungal, "lady of the Iturungal canal," in it. In the late Old Babylonian period, many of the functionaries of the cults of Inanna of Uruk, Nanaya and Kanisurra moved to Kish. In the same period, Kanisurra was also worshiped in the territories controlled by the First Sealand dynasty. However, only a single offering list from the latter area mentions her. Based on its context it is likely that it was connected to Uruk, perhaps because it was also the result of displacement of the cults native to that city. Kanisurra and Nanaya were also worshiped in Eturkalamma, a temple of Ishtar in Babylon.

In the first millennium BCE Kanisurra is attested on a kudurru (boundary stone) from the reign of Marduk-zakir-shumi I which mentions a certain Ibni-Ishtar, who held various positions among the clergy of Ishtar, Nanaya and Uṣur-amāssu. A gate, a street and a city quarter named after her existed in Uruk. She might be one of the deities collectively referred to as "the ladies" (^{d}GAŠAN.MEŠ) who often appear alongside the five lead deities of this city (Ishtar, Nanaya, Uṣur-amāssu, Urkayītu and Bēltu-ša-Rēš) in Neo-Babylonian inscriptions, though this theory is presently impossible to prove conclusively. She continued to be associated with Uruk as late as in the Seleucid period. The late sources indicate that she was among the deities worshiped during the akitu festival of Ishtar.
