= Shullat and Hanish =

Pair of Mesopotamian gods

- Twin gods of destruction

Shullat (Šûllat) and Hanish (Ḫaniš) were a pair of Mesopotamian gods. They were usually treated as inseparable, and appear together in various works of literature. Their character was regarded as warlike and destructive, and they were associated with the weather.

== Names ==
Multiple syllabic spellings of the name Shullat are attested in cuneiform texts, including ^{d}śu-ul-la-at, ^{d}šu-il-la-at, ^{d}šu-ul-la-at and ^{d}su-ul-ut. The spelling of Hanish's name was consistently ^{d}ḫa-ni-iš. Shullat's name was sometimes written logographically as ^{d}PA and Hanish's as ^{d}LUGAL.

Ignace Gelb proposed that their names were derived from the Akkadian words šullatum, "despoilment," and ḫanīšum, "submission," but Dietz Otto Edzard and Wilfred G. Lambert note that while it is certain that both were derived from a Semitic language, their precise meaning is unknown, and it cannot be ruled out that speculative etymologies were already present in ancient scholarship. Daniel Schwemer in a more recent study concludes that no fully plausible etymology has yet been proposed for either name.

== Character ==
In most known sources, Shullat and Hanish appear as a pair. Douglas Frayne goes as far as proposing they should be understood as a single deity with a compound name, similar to Ugaritic Kothar-wa-Khasis. However, while references to them in an inscription of Shulgi are grammatically singular, the view that they were a single deity, rather than a pair, is otherwise not accepted by researchers. The god list An = Anum refers to them as šena-ilān(a), "two gods" or "twin gods." Paul-Alain Beaulieu considers them to be two of the deities who entered the Mesopotamian pantheon in the early period of interaction between speakers of Sumerian and Akkadian. He notes that unlike some of the other deities of the latter group, for example Shamash, they were not identified with any Sumerian deities, but nonetheless entered the common pantheon as minor deities.

Shullat and Hanish are assumed to be minor weather deities. Andrew R. George proposes identifying them as personifications of gale. However, as noted by Daniel Schwemer, while it has been proposed in the past that Hanish was in origin an independent Ishkur-like weather deity, no known sources support this conclusion. Both of them were described as warlike and destructive. An omen text mentions the pair marching alongside troops on campaign. Andrew R. George describes them as "twin agents of destruction." It is possible that both of them were associated with Ishkur/Adad, but the extent of this connection is uncertain. In a Šurpu passage, they occur near Adad and alongside his children Misharu and Uṣur-amāssu. In astrological texts and in the god list An = Anum, Shullat could be identified with Shamash, and Hanish with Adad. However, elsewhere, for example in the Epic of Gilgamesh, they are treated as separate deities.

"Twin stars" associated with Shullat and Hanish in various works of Mesopotamian astronomy might correspond to Mu Centauri and Nu Centauri.

== Worship ==
The cult center of Shullat and Hanish is presently unknown. The oldest attestations of worship of this pair are theophoric names from the Sargonic period. For example, one name invoking Hanish is known from Adab. It has been proposed that they were worshiped in the role of personal or family gods.

In the Ur III period, king Shulgi of Ur built a temple of Shullat and Hanish, but neither its name nor location are presently known. Offerings to both of them are also attested in documents from Umma and Puzrish-Dagan from the same period.

An individual bearing the name Nūr-ilišu built a shrine (É) dedicated to Shullat and Hanish in Sippar. It is also known that they had a priest (šangûm) in that city in the Old Babylonian period. An oath formula from Sippar, based in part of Sargonic forerunners, mentions Shullat and Hanish: "I swear by Umu (deified day), by Shamash, by Ishtar, by Ilaba and Annunitum, by the warriors Shullat and Hanish, this is not lies, it is true." They also often appear together in Old Babylonian cylinder seal inscriptions.

A taboo of Shullat and Hanish is mentioned in an inscription of the Kassite ruler Agum Kakrime: "The one who knows shall show (only) the one who knows, the one who does not know shall not see. The taboo of Shullat and Hanish: Shamash and Adad, the lords of divination." Another taboo is recorded in an oracular text from the Library of Ashurbanipal: "The blind, the gap-toothed or the finger amputee shall not approach the place of divinatory decision - this is the taboo Šullat and Ḫaniš."

A late syncretic hymn to Ninurta, which describes his various body parts as analogous to other deities, his upper back is compared Hanish, characterized as a deity "who establishes plenty, who rains down abundance," and his chest to Shullat, whose description is not preserved.

== Literature ==
Both Shullat and Hanish are mentioned in the Epic of Gilgamesh (tablet XI, line 99) during the description of the flood. It is possible that they can be identified with the throne bearers (guzalû) of Adad mentioned in the same passage, but Daniel Schwemer argues that due to lack of other evidence this is uncertain. Andrew R. George assumes that both passages refer to this pair and suggests that as Adad's vanguard they might be the personification of the gale. They are mentioned in Atrahasis as well, where they similarly partake in destruction leading to the flood, alongside Errakal and Ninurta.

An Old Babylonian copy of the myth of Adapa from Tell Haddad mentions Shullat and Hanish. The passage is broken, but Sara J. Milstein notes that the tablet appears to contain an account of multiplication of mankind after a flood and presumably Adapa's introduction.

In the so-called "Cuthean Legend of Naram-Sin," Shullat and Hanish are mentioned alongside Ishtar, Zababa, Ilaba, Annunitum and Shamash as the deities the eponymous king asks for advice by performing extispicy. In another legend, it is stated that Sargon at one point swore an oath of brotherhood between himself and Kish by a similar group of deities.

In the Epic of Erra, an area of destroyed vegetation is compared to "woodland over which Hanish had passed."
