= Sarpanit =

Mesopotamian goddess regarded as the spouse of Marduk

Zarpanitu
- Queen of the gods, goddess of pregnancy
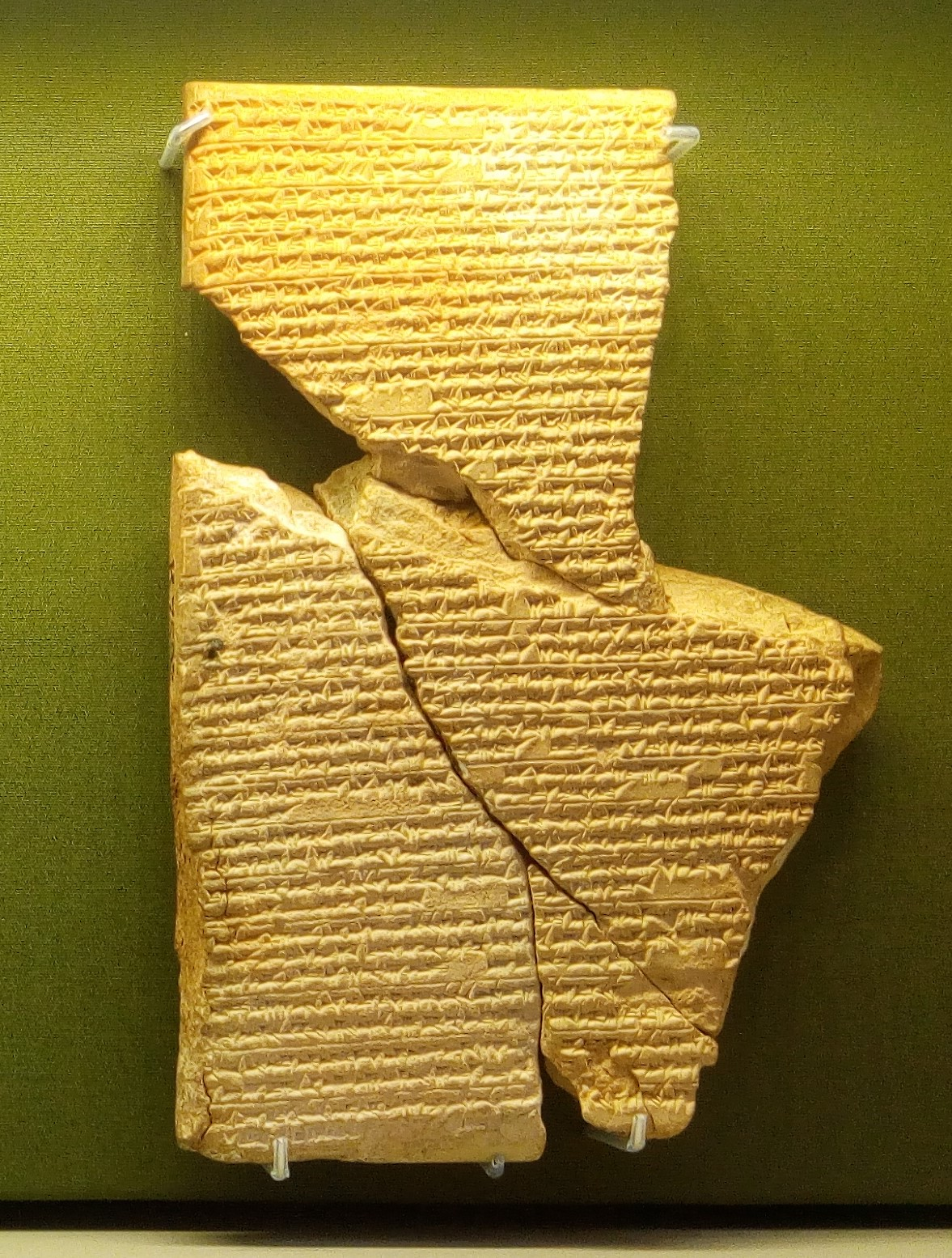
- Tablet with a hymn to Marduk and Zarpanitu attributed to Ashurbanipal. British Museum.
- Other names: Erua, Papnunanki, Elagu, Laḫamun
- Major cult center: Zarpan, Babylon

Genealogy
- Spouse: Marduk
- Children: Nabu, Ṣilluš-ṭāb, Katunna

Zarpanitu (also romanized as Ṣarpānītu) was a Mesopotamian goddess regarded as the spouse of Marduk. Not much is known about her character, though late sources indicate that she was associated with pregnancy and that she could be assigned similar roles as her husband, including that of queen of the gods. She was originally worshiped in Zarpan, a village near Babylon, though the latter city itself also served as her cult center.

== Name ==
The most common spelling of Zarpanitu's name in cuneiform was ^{d}zar-pa-ni-tum. It is romanized as Ṣarpānītu instead by Jeremy Black and Anthony Green, but this choice has been criticized by Wilfred G. Lambert, who points out that while cuneiform does not differentiate between the sounds z and ṣ, supplementary evidence for the former option is provided both by various scholarly etymologies of the name and by texts written in the Aramaic alphabet, which does differentiate between z and ṣ. The Aramaic spelling zrpnt is known from the Sefire inscriptions. Authors such as Paul-Alain Beaulieu, Andrew R. George, Joan Goodnick Westenholz and Takayoshi Oshima (who was responsible for the relevant entry in the Reallexikon der Assyriologie) also favor romanizing the name with a z. However, romanizations starting with ṣ also continue to be used in Assyriological literature.

Zarpanitu's name has Akkadian origin. Two different possible etymologies are well documented in primary sources, "the lady of the city of Zarpan" and "creatress of seed" (from zēr-bānītu). Today it is assumed the name was most likely derived from the toponym Zarpan, a settlement located near Babylon, though seemingly according to a folk etymology it was named after the goddess instead, as attested in a myth known only from a fragmentary tablet from the library of Ashurbanipal. While attempts have been made to etymologize the name as "silvery" instead, this view is now regarded as unsubstantiated.

=== Additional names ===
Two names which originally designated the spouse of Asalluhi, Erua and Papnunanki, came to be used as names of Zarpanitu after her husband Marduk was equated with that god in the eighteenth century BCE. However, this tradition is not yet documented in the Old Babylonian forerunner to the later god list An = Anum, where both of these names are stated to refer to the same goddess, but without identification with Zarpanitu. The theonym Erua could be used either as a sumerogram meant to be read as Zarpanitu or as an epithet, while Papnunanki typically appears in place of her standard name. An early case has been identified in a text from the reign of Samsu-Ditana, who in a formula written in Sumerian refers to Zarpanitu as Papnunanki, in contrast with his predecessors Sumu-la-El, Hammurabi and Samsu-iluna, who all used her primary name in texts written in this language.

According to a god list, secondary names of Zarpanitu were Elagu and Laḫamun, glossed as used in Elam and Dilmun, respectively. However, it has already been pointed out by Friedrich Wilhelm König in the 1930s that Elagu appears exclusively in Mesopotamian, as opposed to Elamite, texts. The second name, while sometimes quoted among Dilmunite theonyms in Assyriological literature as recently as in the 1990s, is similarly known only from sources from Mesopotamia.

== Character ==
Not much is known about Zarpanitu's character. Joan Goodnick Westenholz has suggested that she and Tashmetum were simply "prototypical divine wives". In late sources she could be characterized as a motherly figure connected to birth. She was worshiped under the byname Erua as a goddess associated with pregnancy.

In the first millennium BCE, Zarpanitu's role as the wife of Marduk made her a high ranking deity, which was reflected in the epithets applied to her, such as bēlet ("lady"), bēltīya ("my lady"), šarratu ("queen"), bēlet Bābili ("lady of Babylon"), šarrat Bābili ("queen of Babylon"), bēlet Esagil ("lady of Esagil") or šarrat Esagil ("queen of Esagil"). In some cases, she was effectively portrayed as Marduk's feminine counterpart, with similar characteristics, including a connection to divination, and analogous position in the pantheon, that of queen of the gods. The so-called Archive of Mystic Heptads calls her the "mistress-of-the-goddesses" (^{d}be-let-i-la-a-ti), which presumably reflects her status as the foremost female deity in late Babylonian theology. At the same time, she was not included in royal statements of rulers acknowledging their dependence on Marduk.

== Associations with other deities ==
=== Family and court ===
Zarpanitu's status as the spouse Marduk is seemingly already indicated by a reference to these two deities in a year name of Samsuiluna. The tradition of pairing them with each other might have originated as early as in the third millennium BCE, and they already appear next to each other in the Weidner god list. Other texts belonging to this genre also pair them together, with the exception of Old Babylonian god lists from Nippur, which do not allude to any relationship between them. Zarpanit is instead placed in the section which otherwise lists deities related to Inanna in this case, which according to Joan Goodnick Westenholz is unusual for her. It was believed that Zarpanitu could intercede with Marduk on behalf of petitioners, though Céline Debourse remarks that texts documenting this function could portray her in an ambivalent light, as she could both slander and praise these who asked her to mediate on their behalf, which can be considered a parallel to Marduk being portrayed both as a forgiving and punishing figure himself. Due to being regarded as the wife of Marduk, Zarpanit was also considered the daughter-in-law of Ea.

Nabu was regarded as the son of Zarpanitu and Marduk. This god was initially regarded as the divine "vizier" (sukkal) of the latter, as documented for example in Middle Assyrian An = Anum, but in a late tradition became a member of this god's family instead.

Two minor goddesses, Ṣilluš-ṭāb and Katunna, were considered the hairdressers of Zarpanitu, and could be referred to as the "daughters of Esagil", which presumably reflected their status as daughters of the main deities worshiped in this temple. They were venerated in the Eḫilisigga ("house of beautiful allure"), a shrine located in the temple Erabriri, presumably in Babylon. Similar duos of so-called "divine daughters" are known from other cities too: Borsippa (Kazbaba and Kanisurra, "daughters of the Ezida"), Kutha (Dadamušda and Bēlet-ilī, "daughters of the Emeslam"), Kish (Iqbi-damiq and Ḫussinni, "daughters of the Eduba"), Sippar (Mami and Ninegina, "daughters of the Ebabbar"), Dilbat (Ipte-bīta and Bēlet-Eanni, "daughters of the E-ibbi-Ani") and Larsa (Mannu-šāninšu and Larsam-iti, "daughters of the E-Ningubla").

The mythical creature uridimmu (from Sumerian ur-idim, "mad lion") could be described as the door keeper of both Zarpanitu and Marduk, and in a late incantation is implored to intercede with both of these deities on behalf of the petitioner. The same being is also mentioned in a hymn to these two deities attributed to Ashurbanipal, but in this case it appears in a context seemingly indicating influence from its portrayal in Enūma Eliš instead.

=== Syncretism ===
In Assyria, Zarpanitu could be identified with Šerua, which reflected the syncretism between their respective spouses, Marduk and Ashur, first documented under Sennacherib, and was further facilitated by the phonetic similarity between the name of the Assyrian goddess and the secondary name Erua.

Through the eighth and seventh centuries BCE, attempts have been made to subordinate the local theology of Uruk to Babylon, with Babylonian rulers aiming to assimilate both Ishtar of Babylon and Ishtar of Uruk with Zarpanitu. Paul-Alain Beaulieu notes that in the Eanna archive from Uruk in texts from between the reigns of Marduk-apla-iddina II and Nabopolassar the title bēltīya, which typically designated Zarpanitu, is instead used in contexts which indicate Ishtar was meant. He suggests the attempts to syncretize the two to reassert the supremacy of Babylon over Uruk might have originally started in the eighth century BCE, as some accounts of Nabu-shuma-ishkun's reign indicate that the image of Ishtar was removed from Eanna and replaced by a different goddess, deemed "improper" by the chroniclers, with the original only restored in the sixth century BCE by Nebuchadnezzar II. It is possible that some of the syncretic efforts relied on confusion which could be caused by the use of Ishtar's name as a generic term for goddesses, known for example from tablet XI of the Epic of Gilgamesh, as well as the use of the logogram referring to the Sumerian form of the name, Inanna, to spell the generic title bēltu. In later sources from Babylon Zarpanitu and Ishtar of Babylon appear as two separate deities in distinct roles, for example in a text dealing with the relationship between Marduk and Zarpanitu referred to as Love Lyrics, Ishtar of Babylon plays the role of a paramour. However, there is no evidence that the relationship between Zarpanitu, Marduk and Ishtar of Uruk was imagined similarly in Neo-Babylonian Uruk.

== Worship ==
Zarpanitu presumably was originally venerated in Zarpan, a town located in the immediate proximity of Babylon, though she is much better attested than this settlement itself. It is known from a Neo-Babylonian (or later) fragment of a topographical text from Sippar (BM 66534), which mentions its city gates, as well as from a fragmentary myth confirming its association with Zarpanitu. Babylon also served as her cult center, and she worshiped in this city in the Esagil temple complex dedicated to Marduk in a cella known under the ceremonial names E-dara-anna ("house of the ibex of heaven") or E-ḫili-ĝar ("house endowed with luxuriance"). Her seat inside it was known as the Eḫalanki ("house of the secrets of heaven and the netherworld").

The oldest reference to Zarpanitu which can be dated with certainty occurs in the twenty-fourth year name of Sumu-la-El. It commemorated the fashioning of a statue representing her. Another early reference to her can be found in the nineteenth year name of Samsu-iluna, which mentions the construction of thrones for her and Marduk. An inscription dealing with the preparation of a cultic object dated to the reign of either Samsu-iluna or Hammurabi which mentions Zarpanitu, Marduk and Esagil is also known from a copy discovered in Nippur, and according to Douglas Frayne it can be assumed that it pertains to the same event. Many additional references to Zarpanitu occur in letters from the Old Babylonian period, where she is one of the most commonly referenced goddesses, next to Ishtar, Annunitum, Ninsianna, Gula and Aya.

In a New Year (akitu) ritual from Babylon presumed to precede the rise of Marduk to the position of the head of the pantheon under Nebuchadnezzar I, Zarpanitu is listed as one of the deities present during the celebrations, alongside Marduk, Nabu, Nanaya, Sutītu, Zababa, Bau, Nergal, Laṣ and Mammitum. One of the inscriptions of Sargon II (722–705 BCE) commemorating his participation in the akitu festival in the same location mentions Zarpanitu among the recipients of gifts provided by him.

A list of deities worshiped in Assur indicates that Zarpanitu was one of the nineteen deities who were believed to reside in the temple of Gula in this city, with a variant which instead places Annunitum in her position being considered an ancient scribal error as the sequence of deities also contains Ea, his wife Damkina and Marduk.

Theophoric names invoking Zarpanitu are known from sources from the Neo-Babylonian period, though for the most part only women bore them, in contrast with names invoking many other goddesses, for example Bau, Gula, Ishtar, Nanaya or Ningal, which are attested for men too. Only two exceptions are known, Ardi-Ṣarpanitu and Ardi-Erua, both of which are masculine theophoric names invoking her under respectively her primary name and an epithet. They are regarded as atypical.

=== Outside Mesopotamia ===
In the corpus of Ugaritic texts Zarpanitu is mentioned in an incantation against Lamashtu which pairs her with Marduk and invokes them in parallel with Anu and Antu, Enlil and Ninlil, Ea and Damkina and Papsukkal and Amasagnudi. It is one of the twelve examples of texts from this site written in standard cuneiform which are assumed to be patterned after similar Mesopotamian compositions. Direct parallels to individual passages have been identified in the corpus of Mesopotamian incantations against Lamashtu.

In Emar Zarpanitu is attested exclusively in colophons.

== Mythology ==
In literary texts Zarpanitu typically appears alongside Marduk.

A short myth focused on Zarpanitu describes how the town Zarpan was named after her and then gifted to her by Enlil, here identified as her father. Afterwards Ea praises her virtues and suggests to his son Marduk that she would be suitable for him and that they should rule over the sea together. It has been suggested that the name Ninabdubur, "lady of the sea foundation", which is attributed to her in god lists, might reflect this section of the myth.

Zarpanitu is also referenced in Ludlul bēl nēmeqi, where the protagonist prays to her at the Kaḫilisu ("gate sprinkled with luxuriance"), presumably the gate of her cella in Esagil. Andrew R. George points out that it is also attested in inscriptions of Ashurbanipal and Nebuchadnezzar II.

Takayoshi Oshima suggests that in a Neo-Assyrian myth focused on Marduk the name Damkianna, normally considered to be a variant form of Damkina, the wife of Ea, is instead used to refer to Zarpanitu, in parallel with a late prayer attesting a similar situation. A different interpretation has been suggested by Wilfred G. Lambert, who assumed that she is to be understood as Damkina in this context, and based on the unusual character of the text proposed that it originated in Malgium, where this goddess was commonly acknowledged in royal inscriptions, in the Kassite period. The narrative deals with a conflict between Marduk and his allies and the gods of Nippur, led by Enlil, which is ultimately decided in favor of the former by the intervention of Damkianna, though it is not certain what it entailed.
