= Uṣur-amāssu =

Mesopotamian deity

- Deity of justice
- Member of pentad of Uruk
- Major cult center: Uruk
- Gender: originally male, later female

Genealogy
- Parents: Adad and Shala
- Siblings: Šubanuna, Namašmaš, Minunesi, Mīšaru

Uṣur-amāssu (also spelled Uṣur-awāssu or Uṣur-amāssa) was a Mesopotamian deity. While originally viewed as male, she later came to be regarded as a goddess. Regardless of gender, Uṣur-amāssu was considered as a child of Adad and Shala and like other members of their entourage was considered a deity of justice. The earliest attestations of veneration of Uṣur-amāssu are theophoric names from cities such as Kish, but the female version of this deity is best attested in sources from Uruk from the Neo-Babylonian period. She belonged to the pentad of goddesses who stood on top of the local pantheon, which also included Ishtar, Nanaya, Bēltu-ša-Rēš and Urkayītu. She is still attested in texts from the Seleucid period, and continued to be celebrated during an akitu festival.

== Name and gender ==
Uṣur-amāssu's name was derived from an ordinary masculine given name known from Old Babylonian and Old Assyrian sources, Uṣur-awāssu, whose historically notable bearers include a king of Eshnunna and an official from Mari. It can be translated as "heed his word." It was already understood as the name of a minor god in the so-called Genouillac god list, also dated to the Old Babylonian period. According to Paul-Alain Beaulieu it can be assumed that Uṣur-amāssu was already a member of a court of another deity at the time, though the god list An = Anum is presently the oldest source to explicitly identify him as a son and courtier of another deity, namely Adad.

At some point, Uṣur-amāssu started to be viewed as a goddess instead. The female version of this deity is first attested in an inscription of Kaššu-bēl-zēri, a governor of the Sealand, known only from a Neo-Babylonian copy, but originally written in the tenth or eleventh century BCE. According to Rocío Da Riva and Gianluca Galetti, the change most likely occurred when the deity was introduced to the pantheon of Uruk and came to be regarded as a member of the circle of Ishtar. Paul-Alain Beaulieu suggests that while originally Uṣur-amāssu's name implicitly referred to the words of Adad, after the change Ishtar took this role. On occasion, the variant spelling Uṣur-amāssa could be used to indicate that the deity is female, for example in Neo-Assyrian inscriptions, but archives of the Eanna temple in Uruk consistently used the primary name, Uṣur-amāssu, to refer to the female deity, sometimes adding the feminine determinative INNIN to designate gender, resulting in the writing ^{d.innin}Ú-ṣur-a-mat-su. However, there is no evidence that the hypothetical grammatically feminine equivalent, Uṣrī-amāssu or Uṣrī-amāssa, was ever in use.

== Associations with other deities ==
Regardless of gender, Uṣur-amāssu was regarded as a child of Adad, with the female version being explicitly called bu-uk-rat ^{d}IŠKUR, "daughter of Adad." The other children of Adad and his wife Shala and thus siblings of Uṣur-amāssu were the goddesses Šubanuna ("princely šuba stone"), Namašmaš and Minunesi and the god Mīšaru ("justice"). In various religious texts, Uṣur-amāssu frequently occurs in the company of Adad, Shala and various deities from their circle: Mīšaru, his spouse Išartu ("righteousness"), as well as the twin gods Shullat and Hanish.

In Uruk, Uṣur-amāssu belonged to the circle of Ishtar. Paul-Alain Beaulieu considers her one of the members of a pentad of major goddesses of that city in the Neo-Babylonian period, the other four being Inanna/Ishtar, Nanaya, Bēltu-ša-Rēš and Urkayītu. She was commonly paired with the last of these deities, who always appears with her in offering lists. They are also mentioned together in a prescription for the cleaning of a blanket (taḫapšu) which belonged to both of them. A bīt ḫilṣi, "house of pressing," a structure assumed to be a pharmacy accompanied by a garden where the ingredients for various medicines were grown, which was located in the Eanna complex, was described as their joint possession.

Andrew R. George notes that seemingly a close relationship also existed between Uṣur-amāssu and yet another deity from Uruk, Kanisurra, and relates it to both of these goddesses being associated with Nanaya and Ishtar. The view that she functioned as a name of Kanisurra in the first millennium BCE or that she was understood as her Akkadian counterpart can also be found in scholarship.

== Character and iconography ==
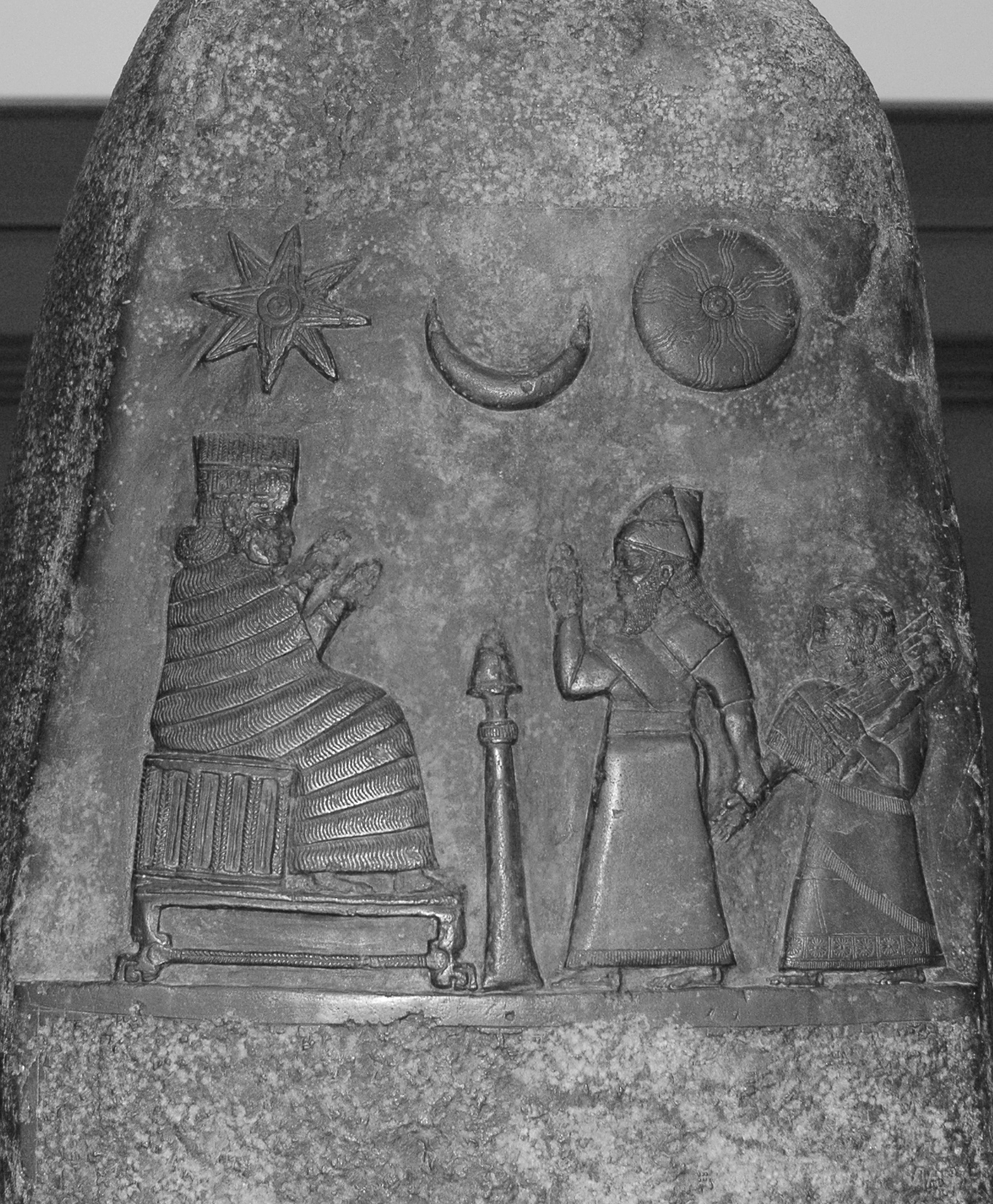
Seated Nanaya on the kudurru of Meli-Shipak II. It is presumed the iconography of Uṣur-amāssu was similar.

Uṣur-amāssu was associated with justice. Theological information about her character is provided in an inscription from the reign of Nabonassar, in which she is called "the august lady, who provides judgment for the land and renders decision for heaven and the netherworld, (...) the one whose command cannot be changed." Most likely, her apparent character as a judiciary deity described in this text was related to her connection to Mīšaru and Išartu.

A text from the reign of Shamash-shum-ukin indicates that Uṣur-amāssu was depicted in a type of tiara analogous to these worn by Nanaya and Ishtar. Its appearance is presumed to resemble that which the former of these two goddesses wears on the kudurru (decorated boundary stone) of Meli-Shipak. It was made out of 47 minas and 16,5 shekels of red gold. While the text also describes all of its individual elements, the terms used are uncommon or entirely unknown otherwise, which makes interpretation difficult. A statue of Uṣur-amāssu clad in a type of robe known as lamaḫuššû is mentioned in a letter from the scholar Mār-Ištar to Esarhaddon describing the repairs taking place in Uruk. Various Neo-Babylonian texts from Uruk also mention a variety of cultic paraphernalia of Uṣur-amāssu, including a standard, a ceremonial wagon (attaru), an unidentified golden weapon (dēpu) and a blanket (taḫapšu; shared with Urkayītu). There are also attestations of figures of scorpion men (girtablilu) belonging to her, which might have been apotropaic, though it is also possible that they were simply decorations sewn to her garments.

Known epithets of Uṣur-amāssu include "denizen of Uruk" (ašibāt Uruk), attested in the inscription of Kaššu-bēl-zēri, and "provider of counsel" (mālikat milki) and "intercessor" (ṣābitat abbūti) from a text attributed to Esarhaddon.

== Worship ==
The oldest attestations of the worship of Uṣur-amāssu come from the Old Babylonian period, and include theophoric names such as Uṣur-awāssu-gāmil and Uṣur-awāssu-nīšu. According to Andrew R. George, the former occurs in a text from Kish, and indicates the deity was worshiped in that city.

The oldest reference to the cult of Uṣur-amāssu in Uruk other than the inscription of Kaššu-bēl-zēri is a building inscription from the reign of Nabonassar. She was seemingly venerated in the Eanna complex, where she had her own sanctuary, bīt Uṣur-amāssu. In an inscription from the Neo-Assyrian period, Ashurbanipal asserts that he brought Uṣur-amāssu, Nanaya and Urkayītu back to Eanna from Elam. It also known that at one point the first two of these goddesses were temporarily removed from Uruk to partake in the enthronement of this ruler. It is also possible that a restoration of their cult occurred during the reign of Esarhaddon, as a text from this period mentions the preparation of new statues of both of them.

In the Neo-Babylonian period, Uṣur-amāssu came to be seen as one of the major deities of Uruk. A kinūnu festival ("brazier," "fire ceremony") was held in the month Kislīmu in honor of Uṣur-amāssu, Urkayītu and Ishtar according to the only known calendar listing religious ceremonies celebrated in this city at the time. A text from the reign of Nabonidus mentions that in the month Dûzu, a number of necklaces of Uṣur-amāssu were placed on a statue of Dumuzi, possibly in connection with a clothing ceremony dedicated to the latter deity. Attested members of clergy of Uṣur-amāssu include a šangû priest (sometimes translated as "pontiff") and prebendaries referred to as ērib-bīti. Offerings made to her included beer, dates, grains (barley, emmer) and bread made from them, sesame, salt and meat of sacrificial animals, for example lambs. A watercourse in the proximity of Uruk, Ḫarru-ša-Uṣur-amāssu, was named after the goddess.

According to Joan Goodnick Westenholz, in the Seleucid period Uṣur-amāssu and Urkayītu were replaced by Belet-seri and Šarrāḫītu in the local pantheon of Uruk. However, Paul-Alain Beaulieu and Julia Krul in more recent studies conclude that she continued to be worshiped. She appears in an akitu ritual alongside Ninimma, Šilamkurra (a daughter of Ninsun) and an otherwise entirely unknown goddess, Ninurbu. A late reference to her is also known from a text describing the ritual journey of Nanaya to Kish, in which she appears alongside Kanisurra.
