= Gazbaba =

Mesopotamian goddess

- Goddess of love
- Major cult center: Uruk (possibly)

Equivalents
- Hittite: Ḫuwaššanna

Gazbaba, also known as Kazbaba or Kazba, was a Mesopotamian goddess closely associated with Inanna, Nanaya and Kanisurra. Like them, she was connected with love and eroticism.

== Name and character ==
Gazbaba's name is most likely derived from the Akkadian word kazbu, which can be translated as "sexual attraction." A form ending in the hypocoristic suffix -īya/-āya/-ūya, ^{d}Ka-az-ba-a-a, is also attested, possibly representing an attempt at making the name more similar to Nanaya's, or resulting from confusion with a similar personal name.

Little is known about Gazbaba's character, but she was associated with love and sex. Šurpu describes her as ṣayyaḫatu, "the smiling one," which is likely a reference to the frequent mention of smiles in Akkadian erotic literature. She belonged to a group of deities invoked in love incantations, which also included Inanna/Ishtar, Nanaya, Kanisurra and Išḫara. For example, one such text contains the formula "Ishtar, Nanaya, Gazbaba help it!"

== Associations with other deities ==
Two late texts, a theological explanatory tablet and a cultic calendar, address Gazbaba and Kanisurra as "Daughters of Ezida," the temple of Nabu in Borsippa, and additionally identify them as Nanaya's hairdressers. Most pairs of deities referred to this way are known from northern Mesopotamia. In addition to Daughters of Ezida, known pairs include the daughters of Esagil in Babylon (Katunna and Sillush-tab), the daughters of Emeslam in Kutha (Tadmushtum, a daughter of Nergal in the god list An = Anum, and Belet-ili), daughters of Edubba in Kish (Iqbi-damiq, "she said 'it is fine!'," and Hussinni, "Remember me!"), daughters of Ebabbar in Sippar (Mami and Ninegina), daughters of E-ibbi-Anum in Dilbat (Ipte-bita and Belet-eanni), and a further similar dyad associated with a temple of Ningublaga in an unknown location, possibly Larsa (Mannu-shanishu and Larsam-iti). Nameless pairs of such "Divine Daughters" are also known from Uruk, Nippur and Eridu in Babylonia and Arbela in Assyria. Additionally, some researchers, like Julia M. Asher-Greve and Joan Goodnick Westenholz, place the Ningublaga temple in the south, in Larsa, though according to Andrew R. George its location should be considered unknown. It has been suggested that these pairs of goddesses were imagined as maidservants in the household of the major deity or deities venerated in the corresponding temple. In the case of Gazbaba and Kanisurra, as well as the daughters of Esagil, there is direct evidence that they were viewed as the hairdressers of, respectively, Nanaya and Sarpanit.

It is commonly presumed in modern scholarship that Gazbaba might have additionally been regarded as a daughter of Nanaya, but as pointed out by Gioele Zisa in a recent study, direct evidence in favor of this view is lacking. While both Gazbaba and Kanisurra were connected with Nanaya, Gazbaba's link with this goddess appears to be stronger in known texts. Most notably, she never appears alone in love incantations, but rather always alongside Nanaya.

== Worship ==
Gazbaba was most likely worshiped in Uruk, and appears among other deities associated with this city, such as Kanisurra, Nanaya and Mes-sanga-Unug, in an exercise text from Babylon. She is also present in the Old Babylonian god lists from Nippur and Isin. A further attestation is known from Mari, though the text appears to simply list deities belonging to the southern Mesopotamian pantheon.

It is possible that a temple of Gazbaba was mentioned in a destroyed passage of the so-called Canonical Temple List, but this assumption is presently purely speculative and relies entirely on the assumption that as a deity closely linked with Nanaya she would likely be mentioned shortly after her.

=== In Hittite sources ===
In Hittite texts, the logogram GAZ.BA.BA or GAZ.BA.YA represented Ḫuwaššanna, the tutelary goddess of Ḫupišna. Little is known about her character, but rites dedicated to her seemingly involved a bed. It has been proposed that she belonged to the sphere of household worship of the royal family. There is however no direct indication in known texts that she was a love goddess like Gazbaba.
