= Mīšaru =

Mesopotamian god personifying justice

- Divine personification of justice
- Major cult center: Dūr-Rīmuš
- Symbol: possibly scales

Genealogy
- Parents: Adad and Shala
- Siblings: Uṣur-amāssu, Šubanuna, Menunesi, Namašmaš
- Spouse: Išartu

Equivalents
- Ugaritic: Mêšaru
- Phoenician: Misor

Mīšaru (Misharu), possibly also known as Ili-mīšar, was a Mesopotamian god regarded as the personification of justice, sometimes portrayed as a divine judge. He was regarded as a son of the weather god Adad and his wife Shala. He was often associated with other similar deities, such as Išartu or Kittu. He is first attested in sources from the Ur III period. In the Old Babylonian period, he was regarded as the tutelary deity of Dūr-Rīmuš, a city in the kingdom of Eshnunna. He was also worshiped in other parts of Mesopotamia, for example in Mari, Assur, Babylon, Sippar and in the land of Suhum. In the Seleucid period he was introduced to the pantheon of Uruk.

A deity with a cognate name, Mêšaru, also belonged to the Ugaritic pantheon. It is assumed that like his Mesopotamian counterpart, he was regarded as a divine judge. A further possibly analogous deity, Misor, is also attested in the writings of Philo of Byblos.

== Name and character ==
Mīšaru's name means "justice," and he functioned as the divine hypostasis of this concept. The theonym was derived from Akkadian ešēru, "to straighten up." As a common noun, the term mīšaru can be explained as the notion of "the performance of royal justice and correcting iniquitous situations." It also referred to a type of edicts issued by rulers in the Old Babylonian period.

It has been proposed that the deity Ili-mīšar, attested in the god list An = Anum (tablet V, line 29) as the sukkal (attendant deity) of Imzuanna (^{d}Ni-zu-an-na) might be a variant of Mīšaru. Daniel Schwemer notes that the addition to the same prefix to various theonyms is well attested, and cites Ilumēr and Ilulāya as two other examples.

It has been proposed that on cylinder seals Mīšaru was depicted as a figure holding scales, though this theory has yet to be proved.

== Associations with other deities ==
Mīšaru was regarded as a son of the weather god Adad, and in the god list An = Anum appears in the same section as his other children: Uṣur-amāssu, Šubanuna, Menunesi and Namašmaš. Their mother was Shala. Manfred Krebernik suggests that the association between Mīšaru and Adad might have been the result of the development of a folk etymology connecting the name of the former with the word šarum, "wind." Daniel Schwemer assumes that it instead reflected Adad's connection with law. In Šurpu and in Lipšur litanies Mišaru is grouped with Adad, Uṣur-amāssu and the pair Shullat and Hanish. In the so-called Extispicy Ritual I, a manual for diviners, he is mentioned alongside Adad, Shamash, Aya and Kittu among deities who could receive offerings while an oracle was performed. He also appears as a member of the circle of deities associated with his father both in the Weidner god list and in An = Anum. While the connection is also affirmed by inscriptions from many cities, Mīšaru is nonetheless also attested in contexts where no relation to the weather god is indicated in texts from Sippar and [Assur, where he was seemingly treated as a divine judge associated with Kittu.

The goddess Išartu formed a pair with Mīšaru, and together they represented the idea of law and order. Julia Krul notes she seemed to be his feminine counterpart. An = Anum refers to her as his spouse.

== Worship ==
The oldest evidence of the worship of Mīšaru comes from the Ur III period. He received offerings in Bad-tibira during the reign of king Shu-Sin. He is also attested in Akkadian theophoric names, such as Puzur-Mīšar.

Old Babylonian sources mention a single temple of Mīšaru, located close to the city of Dūr-Rīmuš in the Diyala area. It is assumed that he was the tutelary deity of this settlement. One of the inhabitants of Dūr-Rīmuš apparently dedicated a seal to him for the health of the Eshnunnean king Ipiq-Adad II after it was incorporated into his kingdom. He is also attested in an offering list from Mari (ARM 24 263), in which he appears alongside the deity Išar, presumed to correspond to Išartu.

In a copy of an Old Assyrian inscription of Erishum I found in Kültepe, Mīšaru (^{d}Me-ša-ru-um) appears as a member of a group of seven divine judges alongside deities such as Ishmekarab. He is also attested in the same role in another, later list of similar deities worshiped in Assyria. In the version of the Tākultu ritual from the reign of Ashurbanipal, he is listed alongside Ea and Kittu. In the Ešara temple complex in Assur he was worshiped alongside Latarak in the lobby of the structure.

In Babylon, Mīšaru was worshiped alongside his father Adad in the Esagil temple complex. A temple dedicated to him is also mentioned in documents from Dūr-Abī-ešuḫ, though no ceremonial name is given.

Attestations of veneration of Mīšaru are known from Suhum as well. An akitu temple dedicated to him and Adad existed in Udada. It was rebuilt by Ninurta-kudurri-usur, a local ruler from the eighth century BCE.

On one of the cylinders of Nabonidus, in an inscription pertaining to the Ebabbar temple in Sippar, Mīšaru is mentioned alongside Kittu and Dayyānu as the deities "seated in front of Shamash."

While Mīšaru was not yet worshiped in Uruk in the Neo-Babylonian period, he is attested in religious text from this city dated to the reign of the Seleucids. He was worshiped in Eḫenunna, "house of abundance," a temple of Adad. The text TU 39 mentions that on the fifth day of the month Araḫsamna, Mīšaru had to leave the temple to partake in rites taking place elsewhere. It has been pointed out that in addition to him and Shala spouses, children or courtiers of many other deities were also introduced to Uruk at the same time.

== Ugaritic Mêšaru ==
A deity whose name is a cognate of Mīšaru's is attested in Ugarit as well. The theonym was rendered as mšr in the local alphabetic script, and can be vocalized as Mêšaru ("rectitude," "uprightness"). It is presumed that he was regarded as a divine judge. He was paired with Ṣidqu ("righteousness"). They appear together in a single religious text (RS 24.271, line 14), which is presently the only certain attestation of Mêšaru. A possible theophoric name, written as mšrn in the alphabetic script and as Me-ša-ra-nu or Me-ši-ra-nu in standard syllabic cuneiform, has also been identified. Elsewhere in the Ugaritic texts the word mšr is attested as a common noun.

=== Further possible cognates ===
Wilfred G. E. Watson proposes that the Ugaritic Mêšaru and Ṣidqu correspond to Misor and Suduk, who according to Philo of Byblos were Phoenician gods of justice. He also credits them with discovering the use of salt, and presents the god Taautos, derived from Egyptian Thoth, as the son of Misor. It also has been suggested that passages in the Hebrew Bible using the term mîšôr("equity"), such as Psalm 9:9, Psalm 45:7 and Isaiah 45:19 are echoes of the worship of a further deity with a cognate name, who was originally regarded as a subordinate of Yahweh but later came to be demythologized, but this is less certain and no passage directly supports this view.
