= Bēltu-ša-Rēš =

Mesopotamian goddess

- Protective goddess of the Rēš temple
- Member of the pentad of Uruk
- Major cult center: Uruk

Bēltu-ša-Rēš was a Mesopotamian goddess associated with a temple, or temples, bearing the name Rēš. She is only attested in sources from Uruk from the Neo-Babylonian and Seleucid periods. In the former, she belonged to the pentad of main deities of the city alongside Ishtar, Nanaya, Uṣur-amāssu and Urkayītu. In the latter, she served as the protective deity of a new temple complex dedicated to Anu and Antu.

== Name and character ==
The theonym Bēltu-ša-Rēš can be translated as "Lady-of-the-Rēš" or "Mistress of the Rēš Temple." Her identity remains uncertain, though according to Paul-Alain Beaulieu, her name might be related to the ceremonial name of a temple of Lugalbanda located in Kullab, É.SAG, "foremost temple." However, whether the É.SAG is related to a temple of Anu and Antu attested in documents from the Seleucid period, known as either as É.SAG, Rēš or Bīt Rēš, remains uncertain. Julia Krul in a recent study concludes that the origin of the name remains a mystery, as no certain attestation of a temple referred to as Rēš predating first references to Bēltu-ša-Rēš is presently known. She considers it possible that the Rēš in mention might have been the name of a structure built in Uruk in the Neo-Assyrian period which was later abandoned but whose name was preserved until the Seleucid period, when it was assigned to the new complex.

Jeremiah Peterson suggested in a 2009 study of god lists that the theonym ^{d}Lu_{2}-saĝ-ĝa, found in the Nippur god list but otherwise entirely unknown, which according to him might represent a deity representing the divine counterpart of a "court eunuch" (lu_{2}-saĝ), could be related to later Bēltu-ša-Rēš, as the Akkadian translation of the name of the corresponding office is ša reši(m). However, he subsequently retracted this proposal in an errata published in the Assyriological periodical Nouvelles Assyriologiques Brèves et Utilitaires, as Bēltu-ša-Rēš's name is not etymologically related to ša reši(m).

The most common spelling of the name in Neo-Babylonian sources is ^{d}GAŠAN šá SAG, though ^{d}GAŠAN šá re-e-šú and ^{d}GAŠAN šá reš-šú are also attested. A further variant occurs in later Seleucid sources, ^{d}GAŠAN šá ^{é}SAG.

== Worship ==
The only known references to Bēltu-ša-Rēš come from texts from Neo-Babylonian and Seleucid Uruk. However, it has been proposed that she might have already been worshiped there in the preceding Neo-Assyrian period.

According to Paul-Alain Beaulieu, Bēltu-ša-Rēš belonged to a pentad of main goddesses of Neo-Babylonian Uruk, with the other four members of this group being Ishtar, Nanaya, Uṣur-amāssu and Urkayītu. Joan Goodnick Westenholz instead concluded that she, Ishtar and Nanaya formed a triad, though she considered the pentad proposal a possibility as well. Like other members of Ishtar's entourage, Bēltu-ša-Rēš was worshiped in the Eanna temple complex. Commodities offered to her included salt, dates, barley, emmer, flour, mersu (a type of cake), as well as meat of various animals, including oxen, sheep, geese, ducks and turtledoves. Jewelry described as her property, including a crescent-shaped chest ornament, is also mentioned in the Eanna archive.

In the Seleucid period, Bēltu-ša-Rēš occurs both in ritual and legal texts. Like other deities from the entourage of Ishtar, she was relocated into a new temple, Irigal. It is also presumed that she functioned as a protective goddess of the Rēš temple complex, a new structure dedicated to Anu and Antu. However, it cannot be presently established with certainty whether a separate shrine dedicated to her existed in its inner sanctum, as sometimes proposed.

No theophoric names invoking Bēltu-ša-Rēš are known. According to Julia Krul, her absence from them might be tied to her role as a protective deity of the Rēš, as the structure itself could be invoked in names instead, with the name Arad-Rēš appearing over a hundred times in Seleucid documents.
