= Muati =

Mesopotamian god

Genealogy
- Spouse: Nanaya

Muati was a Mesopotamian god. His character is poorly known. He was regarded as the spouse of Nanaya in Old Babylonian sources. He was later syncretised with Nabu, who likely came to be associated with Nanaya for this reason. Muati is attested in a poem from the reign of Abi-Eshuh, in which he is implored to mediate with his wife on behalf on this ruler. Additionally, he is mentioned in a single text from Isin, possibly in a document from Larsa, and in a god list counting him among the deities of Uruk.

== Character ==
Muati's character is poorly understood, though it is known that he was regarded as the spouse of Nanaya. According to Giole Zisa, it is possible that her nameless partner in love incantations, where they are listed in parallel with couples Inanna and Dumuzi and Išḫara and Almānu, might be Muati. From the reign of Marduk-apla-iddina I onward, Nanaya could instead be associated with Nabu. Since Nabu and Muati came to be equated at some point, it is possible that the spousal connection with Nanaya was transferred between them. In the first millennium BCE, Muati was effectively an alternate name of Nabu. Marten Stol treats Muati and Nabu interchangeably in his discussion of deities associated with Nanaya in the Old Babylonian period already, but Francesco Pomponio and Wilfred G. Lambert stress that they were most likely fully separate at first. They appear in separate sections of the god list An = Anum, with no indication of conflation, but they are equated in the later An = Anu ša amēli. Takayoshi M. Oshima argues that in the early second millennium BCE Muati might have been viewed as a son of Marduk, with Nabu only functioning as his vizier; he assumes their roles were later swapped around, with Nabu becoming Marduk's son and Muati his vizier, before the two were eventually conflated.

An = Anu ša amēli refers to Muati as "Nabu of Dilmun". Ebbe Egede Knudsen on this basis suggested a connection between him and the personal name of an inhabitant of Dilmun, me-a-ti-a-nu-um. However, Khaled Nashef concluded that the god list entry linking Muati with Dilmun is most likely an ancient error, and points out the existence of multiple other lists designating the Dilmunite deity Enzag as the "Nabu of Dilmun". He also stated that due to lack of evidence me-a-ti-a-nu-um cannot be considered an example of a theophoric name invoking Muati. Daniel T. Potts also considers the connection to be doubtful. Ryan D. Winters similarly concludes the association between Muati and Dilmun in An = Anu ša amēli is likely to be an ancient error.

== Worship ==
A poem focused on the relationship between Muati and Nanaya known from only one copy implores him to intercede with her on behalf of Abi-Eshuh, the king of Babylon between 1711 and 1684 BCE. Presumably it was composed during his reign. According to Aage Westenholz and Joan Goodnick Westenholz, Muati is additionally attested in a single text from Old Babylonian Larsa which might indicate a statue representing him stood in the local temple of Nanaya. However, Dominique Charpin has expressed doubts about the restoration of the theonym, and thus about the worship of Muati in Larsa. A single reference to him has also been identified in a hitherto unpublished text from Isin. In a fragmentary Old Babylonian god list (VAT 6563) he appears among deities linked with Uruk alongside Nanaya.
