= Urkayītu =

Mesopotamian goddess

- Goddess of Uruk
- Member of the pentad of Uruk
- Major cult center: Uruk

Urkayītu, also known as Urkītum, was a Mesopotamian goddess who likely functioned as the divine representation of the city of Uruk. Her name was initially an epithet of Inanna, but later she came to be viewed as a separate goddess. She was closely associated with Uṣur-amāssu, and like her belonged to the pentad of main goddesses of Uruk in the Neo-Babylonian period. She also continued to be worshiped in this city under Achaemenid and Seleucid rule.

== Name ==
The theonym Urkayītu is an Akkadian nisba and can be translated as "the Urukean." Names of Mesopotamian goddesses which were etymologically adjectives derived from the names of corresponding cities are common, and the earliest examples are known from the third millennium BCE. The earliest attested form of Urkayītu's name is Urkītum. According to Manfred Krebernik, a late school text from Babylon still lists this version of the name as one of the two "Daughters of E-Ningublaga" alongside Mannu-šāninšu, but according to Andrew R. George and Joan Goodnick Westenholz the second theonym in this passage should be restored as Larsam-iti, ^{d}Larsam(UD.UNU.KI)-i-ti.

The spelling of Urkayītu's name in cuneiform shows a degree of variety in known sources. While in texts from the first millennium BCE the name of the city of Uruk is typically written with logograms (UNUG^{ki}, ^{uru}UNUG^{ki}, TIR.AN.NA^{ki}), and syllabic spellings are rare, the opposite is true for the theonym derived from it. Examples of partially logographic spellings are nonetheless known, for example ^{d}UNUG^{ki}-i-tú or ^{d}UNUG^{ki}-a-ti. In Neo-Assyrian sources, the attested syllabic spellings are ^{d}Ur-kit and ^{d}Ur-kit-tú. Neo-Babylonian variants include, among others, ^{d}Uš-ka-a-a-i-tu_{4} and ^{d}Áš-ka-a-a-i-tu_{4}. It has been proposed that an earlier logographic theonym, AN.^{d}INANNA(-Unu^{ki}), was read as Urkītum in Akkadian, though there is no agreement regarding this problem in scholarship and which deity or deities it refers to remains uncertain.

== Character ==
It has been proposed that Urkayītu can be understood as a theos eponymos of Uruk, a divine representation of the city. It is presumed that originally the theonym Urkayītu functioned as an epithet of Inanna, and only developed into a distinct goddess later on. An analogous process is attested for Annunitum. Inanna's association with the city of Uruk is well documented, and she appears as the goddess of this city in sources from between the fourth millennium BCE and the Parthian period. The god list An = Anum explains Urkayītu as a name of Inanna of Uruk in line 117 on tablet IV: dInanna-Unu7ki = Aš-ka-i-tu. In a Neo-Assyrian hymn to Nanaya, Urkayītu instead appears to function as her epithet. However, in sources from Uruk from the Neo-Babylonian period she functions as an independent goddess. A lament for Dumuzi from the same period nonetheless still treats this theonym as an epithet of Inanna.

== Worship ==
The oldest attestations of the theonym Urkayītu (Urkītum) come from the Old Babylonian period, though it is impossible to tell if it was already understood as the name of a distinct goddess at this time. A text from Kish mentions a SANGA priest of Urkayītu whose presence in this city was most likely an effect of transfer of cults from Uruk to the north during the reign of Samsu-iluna. Theophoric names such as Urkītum-ummī ("Urkayītu is my mother") or Ṣillī-Urkītum ("Urkayītu is my protection") are also known.

References to Urkayītu occur in a number of Neo-Assyrian texts. She is listed among deities Shamshi-Adad V took away from Der. Ashurbanipal in one of his inscriptions states that he brought her back to Eanna in Uruk from Elam alongside Nanaya and Uṣur-amāssu.

Urkayītu is well represented in texts from Neo-Babylonian Uruk. According to Paul-Alain Beaulieu, she belonged to a group he refers to as the "companions of Ištar," a pentad of goddesses whose other four members were Ishtar/Inanna herself, Nanaya, Bēltu-ša-Rēš and Uṣur-amāssu. She was particularly closely connected with the last of these deities. In sources from Neo-Babylonian Uruk, they are always paired with each other in offering lists. It also presumed Urkayītu was worshiped in the temple of Uṣur-amāssu. A bīt ḫilṣi ("house of pressing," likely a pharmacy with a medicinal plant garden) which was a part of the Eanna complex was described as their joint possession. They also appear together in text about the cleaning of a blanket (taḫapšu) which belonged to both of them. The only surviving cultic calendar from Neo-Babylonian Uruk indicates that in the month Kislīmu, a festival referred to as kinūnu ("brazier" or "fire ceremony") was held in honor of Urkayītu, Uṣur-amāssu and Ishtar. She was also celebrated during a ceremony involving a procession (tebû). According to offering lists, she received salt, dates, bread, grain, sesame oil and meat. Additionally, references to a tiara decorated with plant motifs, a diadem decorated with carnelian beads, and various pieces of jewelry regarded as her possessions are known. Two names of watercourses invoking Urkayītu are attested in Neo-Babylonian texts from Uruk, Ḫarru-ša-Urkayītu and Nāru-ša-Urkayītu, though they might refer to the same topographic feature. She is also attested in theophoric names from this city, such as Urkayītu-ṭābat ("Urkayītu is benevolent") and Ina-ṣilli-Urkayītu ("Under the protection of Urkayītu"), and from outside it, for example Urkayītu-ēreš.

A document from the reign of Darius I indicates Urkayītu was still worshiped under Achaemenid rule. Joan Goodnick Westenholz assumed that in the subsequent Seleucid period she and Uṣur-amāssu were replaced by Belet-Seri and Šarrāḫītu in the local pantheon of Uruk. However, more recently Julia Krul pointed out she is still listed attested in Seleucid sources, and appears among the deities partaking in the Akitu festival of Ishtar in this period. However, despite still being actively worshiped, she no longer appears in theophoric names in the late texts.
