= An = Anum =

Babylonian scholarly list of Mesopotamian deities

An = Anum, also known as the Great God List, is the longest preserved Mesopotamian god list, a type of lexical list cataloging the deities worshiped in the Ancient Near East, chiefly in modern Iraq. While god lists are already known from the Early Dynastic period, An = Anum most likely was composed in the later Kassite period.

While often mistakenly described as a list of Sumerian deities and their Akkadian equivalents, An = Anum is focused on presenting the familial relationships between deities, as well as their courts and spheres of influence. The first four tablets list the major gods and goddesses (Anu, Enlil, Ninhursag, Enki, Sin, Shamash, Adad and Ishtar) and their courts, arranged according to theological principles, but tablets V and VI do not appear to follow a clear system, and tablet VII is a late appendix listing the names of Marduk and one of his courtiers.

Many other works of ancient scholarship were influenced by An = Anum, including a similar list of temples and various theological commentaries. It has also been proposed that it was the basis for the remodeling of the pantheon of Uruk in the Seleucid period.

== History of god lists in ancient Mesopotamia ==
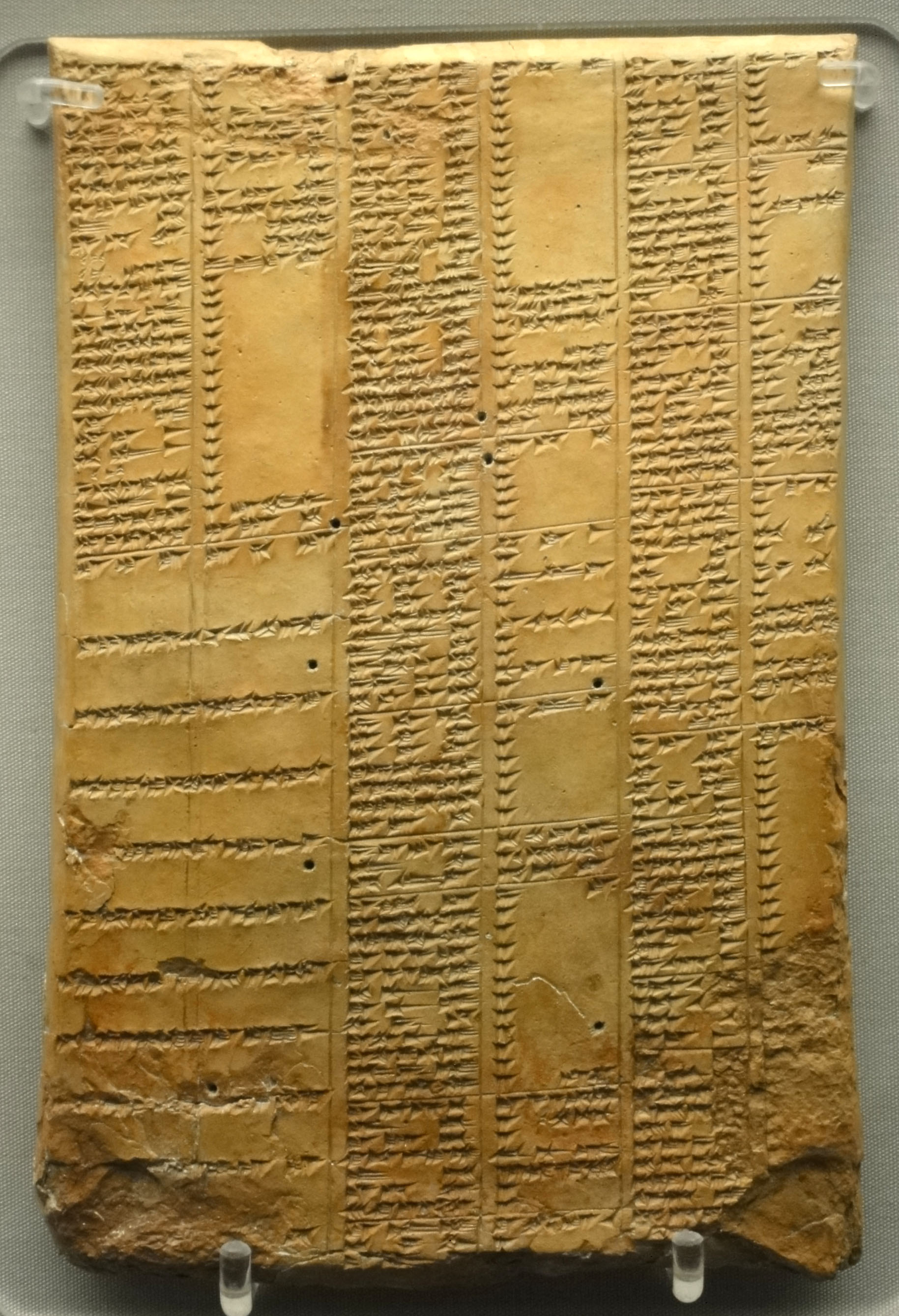
Example of a Mesopotamian lexical list

God lists were a type of cuneiform lexical lists, the oldest genre of texts next to administrative documents. However, the first god lists emerged only around 600 years after the emergence of writing, in the Early Dynastic period. Like other lexical lists, they were presumably copied by scribes as exercises. Due to their original purpose as a learning aid, they were also important for the gradual modern decipherment of cuneiform. The oldest known god list is usually called the Fara god list, though it is also known from copies from Abu Salabikh and Uruk. 466 theonyms can be read from the surviving fragments, though it is estimated that it originally contained 560. While it begins with the head of the pantheon, Enlil (or, in some of the copies, Anu and Enlil), the gods are otherwise arranged based on lexical, rather than theological criteria, for example deities whose names start with the sign NIN are grouped together. Due to many of the names from it being otherwise unknown, little can be said about its contents otherwise. It has been argued that despite cases of theological and lexical subgroups being possible to discern, no principle guided the list as a whole, and it was meant to compile theonyms without necessarily providing additional information and the nature of the individual deities or relationships between them.

No god lists are known from between the end of the Early Dynastic period and the late third or early second millennium BCE, when the so-called "Weidner list" was compiled, though it is assumed that they were still being created through the second half of the third millennium BCE and examples simply have yet to be discovered. The arrangement of deities in the Weidner list does not appear to follow any specific principles, and it has been proposed that it was the result of compiling various shorter lists together. Copies are known from many locations in historical Babylonia and Assyria, as well as from Emar, Ugarit and Amarna. The list was still in circulation in the late first millennium BCE.

While the earliest god lists only had a single column, over the course of the second millennium BCE a two column format became the norm, possibly due to decrease in familiarity with Sumerian, which after the Ur III period survived only as a liturgical and scholarly language, necessitating the addition of explanations in Akkadian. For example, later copies of the Weidner god list at times contain additional columns with explanations of the names. A copy from Ugarit adds columns listing Ugaritic and Hurrian deities.

In the Old Babylonian period, god lists were often the product of strictly local scribal traditions, and distinct ones are known from Nippur, Isin, Uruk, Susa, Mari and possibly Ur. These local lists show a growing tendency to organize deities based on theological, rather than lexical, considerations. Each of them most likely documented the hierarchy of deities recognized in the respective localities. Fragments of many further god lists are known, chiefly from Assyrian copies, but their origin and scope are not fully understood. Some of them focus on geographical distribution on deities, and mention many foreign gods as a result.

While it was common to arrange the names of gods in lists, no analogous scholarly practice is attested for demons, and the incantation series Utukku Lemnutu outright states they were not counted in the "census of Heaven and Earth", indicating the reasons behind this might have been theological.

== An = Anum, its forerunner and other related texts ==
A list regarded as the forerunner of An = Anum has been dated to the Old Babylonian period. It is sometimes called the "Genouillac god list" after its original publisher, Henri de Genouillac. It is only known from one copy of unknown provenance (tablet AO 5376, presently in the Louvre) and from a small fragment from Nippur, but it is presumed it had wider circulation in the Old Babylonian period. It is usually assumed that An = Anum itself was composed in the Kassite period, The most probable date of composition is assumed to be the period between 1300 and 1100 BCE. The name of the list used in modern literature is based on its first line, explaining that the Sumerian name An corresponds to Akkadian Anum. Wilfred G. Lambert proposed that it originated in the city of Babylon. However, according to Jeremiah Peterson documents from Old Babylonian Nippur indicate that both the An = Anum forerunner and other texts showing the beginning of the development of new lists fleshing out the relations between deities were also in circulation among the theologians of that city.

While the forerunner has only 473 entries, over 2000 names are listed in An = Anum (2123 in the most complete known copy). However, this should not be understood as analogous to the presence of 2000 individual deities, as many of the names are instead epithets or alternate names. It is nonetheless the most extensive known god list.

Copies from the second millennium BCE are known from Nippur, Babylon, Nineveh, Assur and Hattusa. YBC 2401, the most complete exemplar, was copied by the Assyrian scribe Kidin-Sin during the reign of Tiglath-Pileser I according to its colophon. This indicates that while Babylonian in origin, An = Anum already reached Assyria by the final decades of the second millennium BCE. Kidin-Sin wrote that he relied on "old tablets" containing the list.

An = Anum continued to be copied in the first millennium BCE. Neo-Assyrian fragments are known almost exclusively from Nineveh. 23 fragments dated to either the Neo-Babylonian or Late Babylonian period are known, but their provenance and precise dating are often uncertain. Both the list itself and various references to it are known from an archive from Seleucid Uruk.

Some of the discovered copies of An = Anum slightly differ from each other. However, the differences are generally limited to spelling of individual names or to inclusion or exclusion of single lines, and there are no major cases of entire passages differing between copies.

Early restorations sometimes confused fragments of An = Anum and An = Anu ša amēli, but the latter list is now considered to be a distinct work of Mesopotamian scholarship and differs from An = Anum due to having three columns, with the third providing an explanation of the first two. There is no indication it depended on material from An = Anum, as very few alternate names of deities listed overlap, and when they do, the sequence differs. An = Anum ša amēli is also more syncretic than An = Anum. (Note: For example Enki is equated with numerous craftsmanship deities, Ninurta with Tishpak and Inshushinak, Shala with Shalash, Nergal with Lā-qīpu, Hendursaga and Dunga, Nisaba with Haya, Nabu with Muati, and Šakkan with Amurru and Samanur.) An = Anum should also be differentiated from a list referred to as "shorter An = Anum" or "smaller An = Anum", which begins with the same first line, but it only documents alternate names of major deities, rather than their families and courts. However, it is assumed that it was at least partially derived from its more extensive namesake.

== Modern research and publication ==
The first modern publication of fragments of An = Anum occurred in 1866 and 1870 in volumes II and III of Henry Rawlinson's Cuneiform Inscriptions of Western Asia, though the transcription contained many errors, and are considered too outdated to use. Fragments continued to be published in the first half of the twentieth century, but a transcription of the most complete copy, presently in the collection of the Yale University, has only been compiled by Richard L. Litke in 1958, and remained unpublished for a long time. In 1976 permission to use Litke's translation was granted to Dietz Otto Edzard, who was the editor of Reallexikon der Assyriologie und Vorderasiatischen Archäologie at the time. Many entries in subsequently compiled volumes of this encyclopedia rely on it. Litke's reconstruction was later published as a book in 1998 in the series Texts from Yale Babylonian Collection.

While a second edition of An = Anum was being prepared by Wilfred G. Lambert for a time, according to William W. Hallo only three first tablets were finished by 1998. Subsequently Lambert also compiled his edition of tablet V. Lambert died in 2011 without ever publishing his edition, but Andrew R. George inherited his notes, and subsequently cataloged them with Junko Taniguchi. However, due to their age Lambert's commentaries on the tablets were partially outdated and thus no longer suitable for publication without alterations. Preparations of a new edition partially relying on them started in 2018, culminating in publication of an annotated An = Anum by Ryan D. Winters, with George and Manfred Krebernik as editors, in 2023. In addition to Lambert's research, it also utilized additional materials provided by Miguel Civil, Anmar Fadhil, Enrique Jiménez, Zsombor Földi, Tonio Mitto and Jeremiah Peterson.

== Contents ==
An = Anum is commonly understood as a list documenting Akkadian equivalents of Sumerian gods in a manner similar to the process of interpretatio graeca, but according to Richard L. Litke this view is mistaken. The primary goal of the compilers of An = Anum was to clarify the familial relationships between deities, briefly describe their functions and characterize each god's household, rather than to provide Sumerian deities with Akkadian equivalents. The commentary, when present, is in Sumerian, rather than Akkadian, which is different from most lexical lists. The gods do not appear to be separated into strictly Sumerian and Akkadian columns. Furthermore, some gods are listed with no equivalents at all, for example Zababa, who was a well established deity. Some deities listed are not Sumerian or Akkadian, but Elamite, "Subarian" (Hurrian), or Gutian. The list documents many associations between deities and aspects of their character which are otherwise unknown. Explanations frequently use the sign MIN in a role analogous to the modern ditto mark. It can be used to refer to both pronunciation of different writings of a name and to theological identification between names. ŠU is used to mark entries as distinct from each other, for example when a list of servants of children of a deity begins after a list of titles explained as MIN.

The entry of each deity is followed by their epithets and alternate names, the name of their spouse, children, and finally servants, if any were known. In some cases the chief attendant deity, so-called sukkal, is listed before the children. Seemingly only the best established deities had a sukkal. The number and precise designation of various divine servants varies, and there seemingly was no standard composition of a divine court, though some titles, such as "doorkeeper" (NI.GAB) or "counselor" (gu_{4}.DÚB), recur more often than others.

An = Anum consists of seven tablets. The initial four tablets list the deities in order of seniority, alongside their courts, but the rest of the list does not appear to follow similar principles. It is possible that it was a result of adding groups of deities from originally distinct texts to An = Anum without rearranging them. Jeremiah Peterson remarks that the reliance on theological factors is nonetheless more evident in An = Anum than in any other known god list. Some of the copies preserve all the material on a single tablet, with a brief summary marked by pairs of horizontal lines indicating the end of each originally separate section. Copies of long works such as god lists or literary composition inscribed on a single tablet are known as dubgallu or tupkallu, or as "monster tablets". (Note: Ryan Winters proposed referring to them as "elephant tablets" instead as a nod of the modern library convention of referring to particularly sizable books as "elephant folios".) YBC 2401 is one such example, and measures 30.5 × 39.5 centimeters (roughly 12 × 15 inches), which makes it one of the biggest clay tablets known.

=== Tablet I ===
Tablet I starts with Anu, Antu and their ancestors. It includes their various servants as well. A sub-section is dedicated to Papsukkal and his circle, including his wife Amasagnudi. Saĝkud appears among Anu's servants as well.

The Enlil section, which follows the Anu one, begins with his ancestors, the so-called Enki-Ninki deities, and includes his wife Ninlil, primordial deities Lugaldukuga (explained as Enlil's father) and Enmesharra, as well as various courtiers, among them the goddess of writing, Nisaba, and her husband Haia, Enlil's sukkal Nuska and his wife Sadarnunna, the scribe goddess Ninimma, the exorcist goddess Ningirima, defined as Enlil's sister, and the beer goddess Ninkasi. A separate sub-section is dedicated to Ninurta, his wife Nin-Nibru, and his own courtiers. The Syrian god Dagan also appears in the Enlil section alongside his wife Shalash, as well as Išḫara. Iabnu is defined as the Elamite counterpart of Enlil. It is additionally possible that a deity whose name is not preserved, identified as "Enlil of Subartu", might be Hurrian Kumarbi.

=== Tablet II ===
Ninhursag (Digirmah, Belet-ili) occupies the beginning of tablet II. Deities listed in her section include her husband Šulpae, her sons Panigingarra and Ashgi, the couple Lisin and Ninsikila, and various courtiers.

The same tablet also contains the section focused on Enki (Ea), accompanied by his wife Damkina. The order of the sections focused on him and Ninhursag is reversed compared to the An = Anum forerunner, which according to Ryan D. Winters might indicate the compilers of An = Anum followed the tradition making the latter the older sister of Enlil, and thus a deity of higher status. A sub-section is dedicated to Enki's son Marduk. It includes his wife Zarpanit. Nabu appears in it as Marduk's sukkal alongside his wife Tashmetum, but he is not yet identified as his son, in contrast with late sources. Other deities present on tablet II include courtiers of Enki, the river god Id, the fire god Gibil, and various minor deities associated with craftsmen and other professions, such as Ninagal. Part of this subsection was likely incorporated from an independent source arranged based on a lexical principle.

=== Tablet III ===
Tablet III describes the moon god Sin (unusually not identified directly as a son of Enlil), the sun god Shamash (Utu) and the weather god Adad (Ishkur). The circle of Sin includes his wife Ningal and various deities associated with cattle herding. Nanshe and deities associated with her, including her husband Nindara, who precedes her, separate his section from that of Shamash. While An = Anum appears to equate Nindara with Sin, there is no evidence for close association between Nanshe and the moon god otherwise. Nin-MAR.KI is placed in the same section as well, but in contrast with earlier sources she is not identified as Nanshe's daughter, which might mean her placement reflected her link to cattle herding instead. The circle of the sun god includes his wife Aya, as well as two distinct groups of courtiers, deities of justice and deities of dreams. The cattle god Sakkan is included in this section too. He is followed by Lahar, though the nature of the connection between them is not specified.

While Sin and Shamash occur in the proximity of each other because they were viewed as father and son, Adad is most likely included on this tablet because of the well established connection between him and Shamash. The section dedicated to him includes his wife Shala, their children (such as Uṣur-amāssu), as well as another weather god, Wer, though other foreign weather gods are absent, in contrast with a later god list, K 2100, whose Adad section contains "Subarian" (Hurrian) Teshub and Kassite Buriyash. The tablet ends with a group of various gods mostly associated with Adad or Shamash, such as Shullat and Hanish, though with some exceptions which were instead linked with Ea, Nisaba or Ishtar. It has been proposed that what unified these deities was their possible Syrian origin, but this view is not universally accepted. Another possibility is that this subsection was incorporated from a list arranged based on lexical principles.

=== Tablet IV ===
Tablet IV documents the circle of Ishtar (Inanna). Due to its contents, it has been nicknamed "the Ištar tablet" by Richard L. Litke. It is less well preserved than other tablets, and full restoration is presently impossible. However, it can be estimated that it originally contained three to four times as many entries as her section in the An = Anum forerunner, which already listed more titles than the section of any other deity. Among the deities listed are Ninegal and various astral deities, such as Ninsianna and Kabta. Tablet IV also most likely originally included Dumuzi and Nanaya sub-sections, which are not preserved. A fragment which presumably originally contained the Nanaya section, which mentions Muati and Kanisurra, has been identified, in addition to a line listing Bizilla, who was closely associated with Nanaya. A major lacuna in which they were presumably originally located is followed by a list of figures associated with the steppe and by a short section dedicated to Gazbaba. A short section is dedicated to Išḫara (who also appears in the Enlil section and in the end of tablet III.) It is followed by one focused on Manzat. The final entry is the deity ^{d}giš-su_{13}-ga, whose character is undefined, but who might be related to Nergal rather than Inanna.

=== Tablet V ===
Tablet V begins with warrior deities associated with specific cities. They include the deified hero Lugalbanda and his wife Ninsun, Lugal-Marada, the tutelary god of Marad, the mongoose deity Ninkilim, the agricultural god Urash (his court includes Lagamal, in other lists present among underworld deities), Nitaḫ, the war god Zababa (whose section also includes Nergal's sukkal Ugur, explicitly identified as such), Abu, and a number of names which seem to be grouped together only because they belong to gods originating in Lagash, among them Ningirsu. This god was usually syncretised with Ninurta and as such regarded as a son of Enlil, but in this case appears separately on a different tablet. Other deities of Lagash listed there include Bau, Gatumdug, as well as Igalim, Shulshaga and a number of children and courtiers of Ningirsu whose names are poorly preserved or lost. Juxtaposition of various deities originating in this area is not exclusive to An = Anum, as attested in a small fragment of an otherwise unknown god list found in Nippur. The next sub-section is centered on medicine goddesses (Ninisina, Ninkarrak, Nintinugga, Gula) and their families (including Pabilsag, Damu and Gunura). They are in turn followed by sections dedicated to the prison goddess Manungal, the underworld goddess Ereshkigal, a group of gods associated with snakes and the underworld (Ninazu, Ningishzida, Tishpak, Inshushinak and Ištaran), the pair Lugal-irra and Meslamta-ea, who were also underworld deities, but have no apparent connection with the preceding gods, and a number of minor figures of similar character, such as Lugala'abba ("lord of the sea").

=== Tablet VI ===
Tablet VI starts with Nergal, his titles, family and court (including Laṣ, Mammitum, Ishum and Ninmug). The rest of the tablet is not arranged according to any discernible principles, and most likely originated as a compilation of material showing some connection to the underworld. Included are various figures explained as ilu lemnu ("evil god"), such as Kingaludda, the weaver goddess Uttu, a group of deities possibly originating in Dilmun, the Sebitti and other groups of seven (as well as the closely connected Elamite goddess Narundi), Amurru, the divine representation of Amorite nomads, and his wife Ashratum, the deified hero Gilgamesh and his companion Enkidu, (Note: The restoration of the name is uncertain, and Enkidu is not attested in other god lists, though Ryan D. Winters notes that the focus on associates of each makes an exception from this rule plausible.) and a number of names belonging to deities of uncertain identity, assumed to be of very minor importance, and a list of collective terms for deities.

=== Tablet VII ===
Tablet VII lists various names of Marduk and of his throne bearer Mandanu. Most of the names are not attested in any other sources, and are likely to be esoteric scholarly inventions. Richard L. Litke considered it a late addition. However, Ryan D. Winters notes that despite focusing on Marduk, it is so far known only from Assyrian copies, which is likely to reflect an early date of incorporation into the canon of An = Anum. According to Wilfred G. Lambert, it should be considered an appendix loosely connected with the rest of the composition, similar to the case of the final tablet of the standard edition of Epic of Gilgamesh.

It has been suggested that further additional tablets might have followed VII. However, this proposal relies entirely on a single damaged colophon, and surviving examples of tablet VII indicate it was treated as the end of An = Anum. Kidin-Sin's copy does contain an appendix, but it consists of unrelated short lists according to the scribe himself included only to fill leftover space on the tablet. The arrangement of some of them follows esoteric and mystical principles, in contrast with An = Anum itself.

== Influence in antiquity ==
An = Anum was itself most likely used as a model for other similar scholarly compositions, for example the so-called Canonical Temple List, which documents temple names rather than god names, though the deities venerated in them are arranged according to similar theological principles. In some cases, the order of deities in An = Anum has been used to support proposed restoration of passages in the Canonical Temple List, for example Andrew R. George notes that the order in which temples of Enlil's courtiers are listed in the latter matches the order of these deities in the former, making it plausible that three missing lines referred to Ninkasi, Ninmada and Ugelamma.

Paul-Alain Beaulieu proposed in 1992 that the changes in the religion of Seleucid Uruk were inspired by adherence to An = Anum. The entire pantheon of the city was restructured, with Ishtar, Nanaya and their court, encompassing deities such as Uṣur-amāssu, surpassed in prominence by Anu and Antu. While Anu was not completely absent from Uruk at any point in time between the third and first millennium BCE, his position was that of a "figurehead" and "otiose deity", in contrast with An = Anum, where he is the foremost god. Beaulieu considers the position of Marduk to be the main difference between An = Anum and the Seleucid pantheon of Uruk, as the position of this god was much lower in the latter case, possibly due to theological conflict between Uruk and Babylon. Today it is agreed that both the elevation of Anu and Antu and the introduction of many new deities, such as Amasagnudi, relied on the study of this god list conducted by priests.
