= Nanaya =

Ancient Mesopotamian goddess of love

- Goddess of love
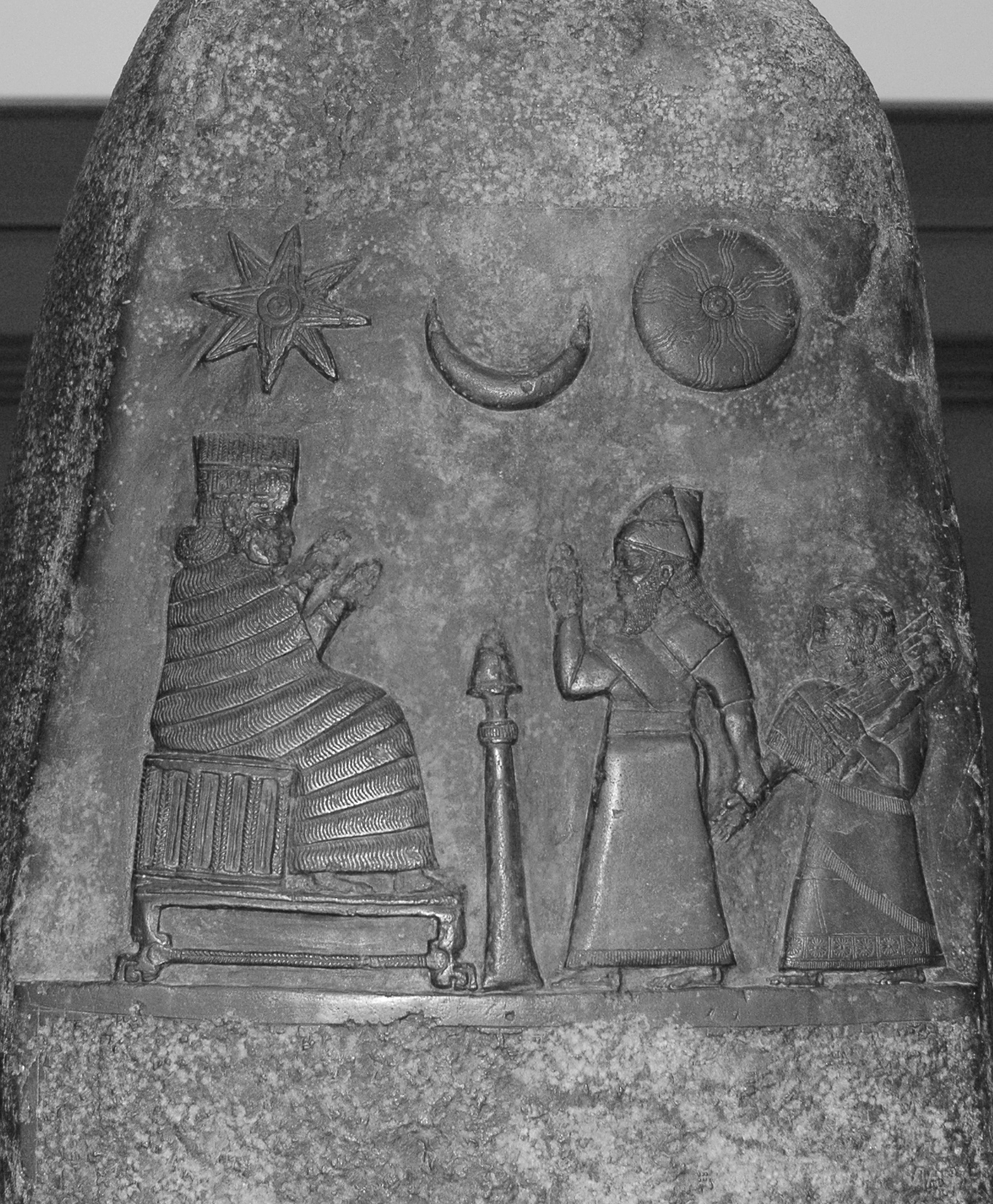
- The Land grant to Ḫunnubat-Nanaya kudurru, a stele of King Meli-Shipak II (1186–1172 BCE). Nanaya, seated on a throne, is being presented the daughter of the king, Ḫunnubat-Nanaya. Kassite period limestone stele, Louvre.
- Major cult center: Uruk, Larsa, Borsippa
- Abode: Eanna

Genealogy
- Parents: Urash (father); Anu (father); sporadically Inanna (mother); sporadically Sin (father, due to syncretism with Ishtar)
- Consort: sometimes Nabu or Muati
- Children: possibly Kanisurra and Gazbaba

Equivalents
- Amorite: Pidray
- Assyrian: Tashmetum (as Nabu's spouse)

Nanaya (Sumerian 𒀭𒈾𒈾𒀀, ^{D}NA.NA.A; also transcribed as "Nanāy", "Nanaja", "Nanāja", '"Nanāya", or "Nanai"; antiquated transcription: "Nanâ"; in Greek: Ναναια or Νανα; Imperial Aramaic: נני, Classical Syriac: ܢܢܝ) was a Mesopotamian goddess of love closely associated with Inanna.

While she is well attested in Mesopotamian textual sources from many periods, from the times of the Third Dynasty of Ur to the Fall of Babylon and beyond, and was among the most commonly-worshipped goddesses through much of Mesopotamian history, both her origin and the meaning of her name are unknown. It has been proposed that she originated either as a minor Akkadian goddess or as a hypostasis of Sumerian Inanna, but the evidence is inconclusive.

Her primary role was that of a goddess of love, and she was associated with eroticism and sensuality, though she was also a patron of lovers, including rejected or betrayed ones. Especially in early scholarship, she was often assumed to be a goddess of the planet Venus like Inanna, but this view is no longer supported by most Assyriologists.

In addition to Inanna, she could be associated with other deities connected either to love or to the city of Uruk, such as Išḫara, Kanisurra or Uṣur-amāssu.

== Name and origin ==
It is accepted in modern literature that "Nanaya" is more likely to be the correct form of the goddess' name than "Nana," sometimes used in past scholarship. The meaning of the name is unknown. Joan Goodnick Westenholz notes that based on the suffix it is most likely Akkadian in origin. She also considers the only possible forerunner of Nanaya to be a goddess whose name was written Na-na, without a divine determinative, known from a few personal names from the earliest records from the Gasur and Diyala areas. The land later known as Namri might be located particularly close to the metaphorical birthplace of Nanaya. However, she notes the evidence is contradictory, as Nanaya herself is not common in later records from the same area, and her cult was centered in Uruk, rather than in the periphery.

Two theories which are now regarded as discredited but which gained some support in past scholarship include the view that Nanaya was in origin an Aramean deity, implausible in the light of Nanaya being attested before the Arameans and their language, and an attempt to explain her name as derived from Elamite, which is unlikely due to her absence from oldest Elamite sources. Occasionally Indo-European etymologies are proposed too, but the notion that there was an Indo-European substrate in Mesopotamia is generally considered to be the product of faulty methodology and words to which such an origin had been attributed in past studies tend to have plausible Sumerian, Semitic or Hurrian origin.

Frans Wiggermann proposes that Nanaya was originally an epithet of Inanna connected to her role as a goddess of love, and that the original form of the name had the meaning "My Inanna!" but eventually developed into a separate, though similar, deity. Olga Drewnowska-Rymarz considers it a possibility that Nanaya was initially a hypostasis of "Inanna as quintessence of womanhood," similar to how Annunitum represented her as a warrior. However, Joan Goodnick Westenholz argued that the view that Nanaya was a manifestation of Inanna in origin should be considered a misconception.

An artificial Sumerian etymology was created for the name in late Babylonian texts, deriving it from NA, "to call," with a feminine suffix, A. A possible translation of this ancient scholarly explanation is "the one who keeps calling" or "the calling one". Invented etymologies were a common topic of late cuneiform commentaries.

== Functions and iconography ==
Nanaya's primary function was that of a goddess of love, and she was referred to as bēlet ruʾāmi, "lady of love". The physical aspect of love was particularly strongly associated with her, and texts dedicated to her could be explicit. For example, a cultic song describes her in the following terms: "When you lean the side against the wall, your nakedness is sweet, when [you] bow down, the hips are sweet," and indicates that the goddess was believed to charge fees for sexual services. She was also viewed as a guardian of lovers, according to a text from Sippar (Si 57) titled "The Faithful Lover" and to some spells especially the disillusioned or rejected ones. Joan Goodnick Westenholz describes her character as seen through the Sumerian texts as that of a "sweet erotic lover" and "perpetual lover and beloved".

A characteristic frequently attributed to Nanaya as a goddess of love, present in the majority of royal inscriptions about her and in many other documents, was described with the Sumerian word ḫili and its Akkadian equivalent kubzu, which can be translated as charm, luxuriance, voluptuousness or sensuality. Joan Goodnick Westenholz favors "sensuality" in translations of epithets involving this term, while Paul-Alain Beaulieu - "voluptuousness." Such titles include bēlet kubzi, "lady of voluptuousness/sensuality," and nin ḫili šerkandi, "the lady adorned with voluptuousness/sensuality." An inscription of Esarhaddon describes her as "adorned with voluptuousness and joy." However, it was not an attribute exclusively associated with her, and in other sources it is described as a quality of both male and female deities, for example Shamash, Aya, Ishtar and Nisaba.

Nanaya was also associated with kingship, especially in the Isin-Larsa period, when a relationship with her, possibly some type of hieros gamos, was "an aspect of true kingship". Joan Goodnick Westenholz rules out any association between Nanaya and nursing in the context of royal ideology.

Nanaya was also one of the deities believed to protect from the influence of a lamashtu demon, in this role often acting alongside Ishtar.

Nanaya eventually developed a distinctly warlike aspect, mostly present in relation to the so-called "Nanaya Eurshaba", worshipped in Borsippa independently from Nabu. She was instead associated with the god Mār-bīti, described as warlike and as a "terrifying hero", and, like in Uruk, with Uṣur-amāssu. Like Inanna, she could also be identified with Irnina, the deified victory.

According to Joan Goodnick Westenholz, a further aspect of Nanaya that presently cannot be determined may be alluded to in an incantation from Isin, according to which she was the denizen of a location usually regarded as profane rather than sacred, the šutummu, understood as treasury, storehouse or granary. The text contrasts her dwelling place with the dais on which Ishtar sits.

Neo-Babylonian archives from Uruk contain extensive lists of cultic paraphernalia dedicated to Nanaya, including a feathered tiara (presumably similar to that depicted on the kudurru (boundary stone) of Meli-Shipak II), a crown, multiple breast ornaments (including breastplates decorated with depictions of snakes and fantastic animals), assorted jewelry and other small valuables like mirrors and cosmetic jars, and a large variety of garments, some of them decorated with golden rosette-shaped sequins).

In a single late text Nanaya is associated with an unidentified spice, ziqqu.

=== Astral associations ===
One of the most recurring questions in scholarship about Nanaya through history was her potential association with classical planet Venus, or lack thereof. Many early Assyriologists assumed that Nanaya was fully interchangeable with Inanna and, by extension, a Venus goddess, but in the 1990s Joan Goodnick Westenholz challenged this view, and most subsequent studies accepted her conclusions. Westenholz argues that the evidence for an association between Nanaya and the planet Venus is scarce and that she was more often associated with the moon. Olga Drewnowska-Rymarz, following her research, concluded in her monograph Mesopotamian Goddess Nanajā that Nanaya was not herself a Venus goddess, and at most could acquire some such characteristics due to association or conflation with Inanna/Ishtar. Michael P. Streck and Nathan Wassermann in an article from 2013 also follow the conclusions of Westenholz and do not suggest an association with Venus in discussion of Nanaya as a luminous deity. Piotr Steinkeller nonetheless asserted as recently as 2013 that Nanaya was simply a Venus goddess fully analogous to Inanna, and interchangeable both with her and with Ninsianna, without discussing the current state of research. Ninsianna is well attested as a Venus deity and was associated with Ishtar and the Hurrian form of Pinikir who had similar character, but Nanaya was regarded as a figure distinct from Ninsianna in Uruk and in Larsa.

Corona Borealis was associated with Nanaya in astronomical texts.

=== Nanaya in art ===
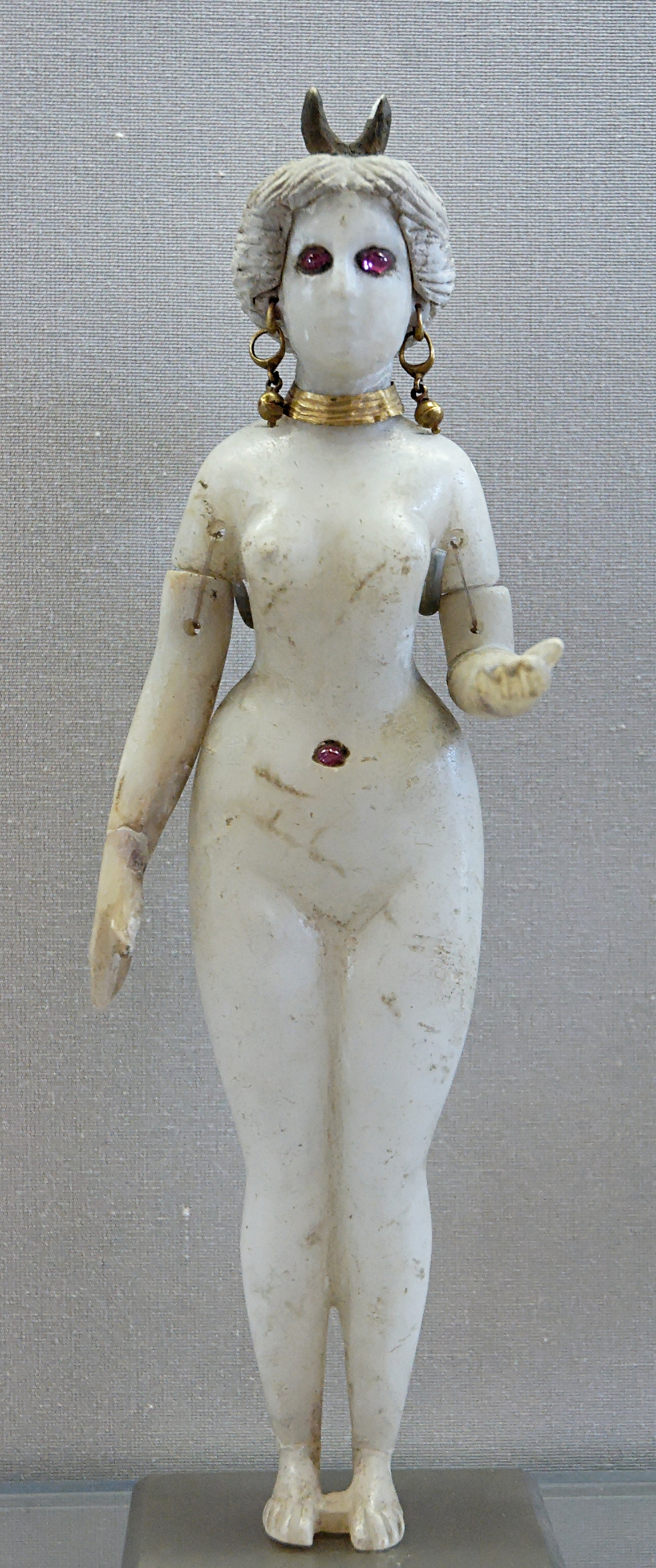
A possible late Hellenized depiction of Nanaya.

While references to statues of Nanaya are known from earlier periods, with no less than six mentions already present in documents from the Ur III period, the oldest presently known depiction of her is the kudurru of Kassite king Meli-Shipak II, which shows her in a flounced robe and a crown decorated with feathers. This work of art is regarded as unusual, as the inscription and the deity depicted on the monument are integrated with each other. The other figures depicted on it are the king in mention, Meli-Shipak II, and his daughter Ḫunnubat-Nanaya, who he leads to the enthroned goddess. Above them the symbols of Ishtar, Shamash and Sin are placed, most likely in order to make these deities serve as a guarantee of the land grant described in the accompanying text.

Another possible depiction of Nanaya is present on a kudurru from Borsippa from the reign of Nabu-shuma-ishkun.

On an Aramean pithos from Assur Nanaya is depicted in robes with a pattern of stars and crescents.

A number of Hellenized depictions of Nanaya are known from the Parthian period, one possible example being the figure of a naked goddess discovered as a tomb deposit, wearing a crescent-shaped diadem. Late depictions also often show her with a bow, but it is uncertain if it was a part of her iconography before the Hellenistic period.

== Associations with other deities ==
=== Deities from the circle of Inanna ===
God lists consistently associated Nanaya with Inanna and her circle, starting with the so-called Weidner god list from the Ur III period. In the standard arrangement she is placed third in her entourage, after Dumuzi, Inanna's husband, and Ninshubur, her sukkal. Another text enumerates Ninshubur, Nanaya, Bizilla and Kanisurra as Inanna's attendants, preserving Nanaya's place right after the sukkal. In later times Ishtar and Nanaya were considered the main deities of Uruk, with the situation being comparable to Marduk's and Nabu's status in Babylon. While Ishtar was the "Lady of Uruk" (Bēltu-ša-Uruk), Nanaya was the "Queen of Uruk" (Šarrat Uruk).

Many sources present Nanaya as a protégée of Inanna, but only three known texts (a song, a votive formula and an oath) also describe them as mother and daughter, and they might only be epithets implying a close connection between the functions of the two rather than an account of a theological speculation. Olga Drewnowska-Rymarz assumes that the evidence only makes it plausible that king Lipit-Ishtar regarded Nanaya as a daughter of Inanna. Joan Goodnick Westenholz describes the relationship between the two goddesses as "definite if unspecified". Only in very late sources from the first millennium BCE they could be fully conflated with each other. Laura Cousin and Yoko Watai argue that their character was not necessarily perceived as identical even in late periods, and attribute the predominance of Nanaya over Ishtar in Neo-Babylonian theophoric names to her nature being perceived as less capricious.

A variety of epithets associate Nanaya both with Inanna and the Eanna temple, for example "ornament of Eanna", "pride of the Eanna", "the deity who occupies the high throne of the land of Uruk".

As early as in the Ur III period, Nanaya came to be associated with the goddess Bizilla. Her name might mean "she who is pleasing" in Sumerian. God lists could equate them with each other. It is assumed that Bizilla occurs among deities from the court of the prison goddess Nungal in some sources too, though Jeremiah Peterson considers it possible that there might have been two deities with similar names, one associated with Nungal and the other with Nanaya. It is possible that Bizilla was regarded as the sukkal of Enlil's wife Ninlil in Ḫursaĝkalama.

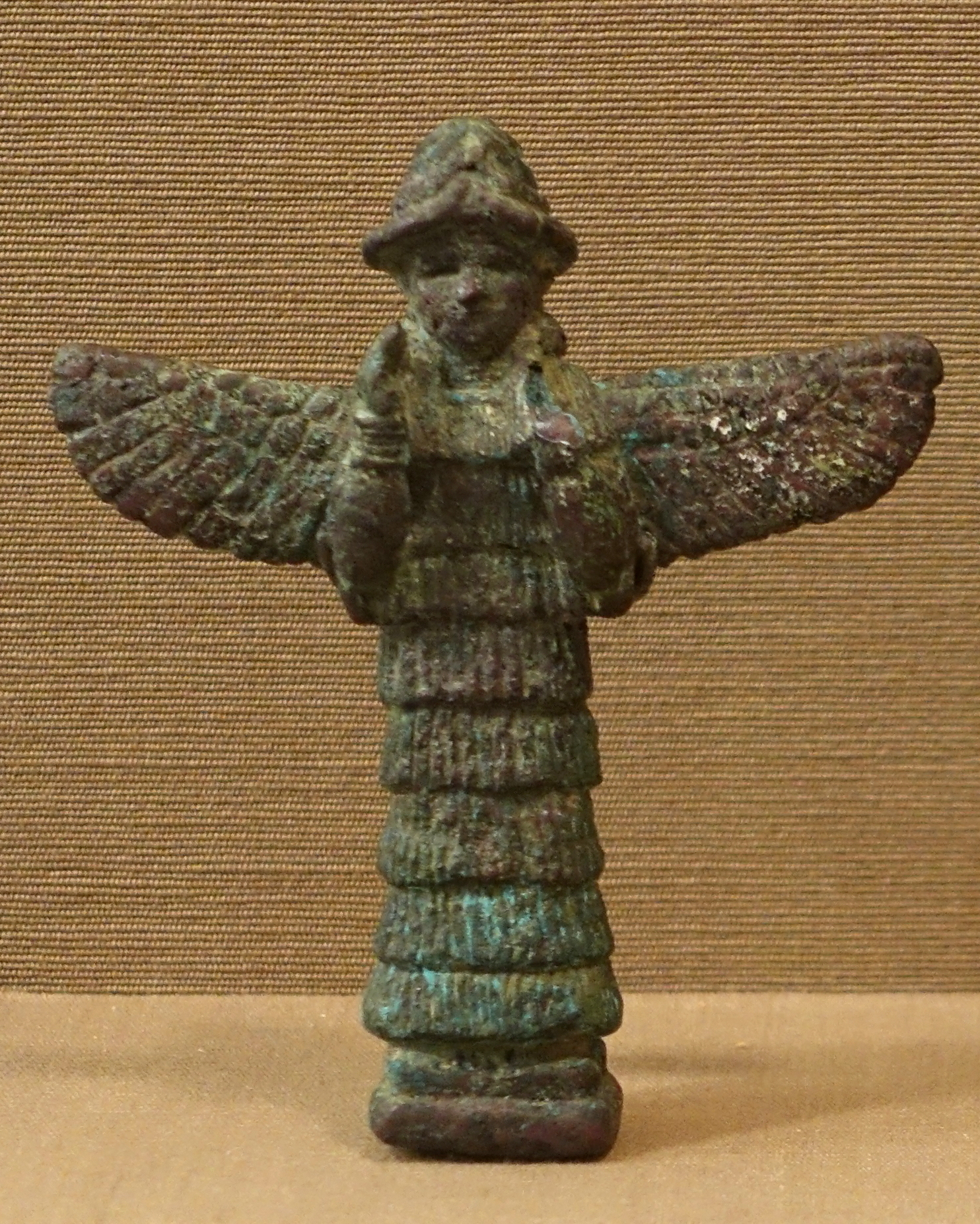
Statuette of a winged lamma from the Isin-Larsa period. Oriental Insistute Museum, Chicago.

Much like Ninshubur, Nanaya was frequently associated with the lamma goddesses, a class of minor deities believed to intercede between humans and major gods, and in some texts she is called the "lady of lamma." One example comes from inscriptions of Kudur-Mabuk and Rim-Sîn I, who apparently regarded Nanaya as capable of mediating on their behalf with An and Inanna, and of assigning lamma deities to them.

Uṣur-amāssu is another deity who is well attested in connection with Nanaya. Olga Drewnowska-Rymarz notes that some publications regard Uṣur-amāssu to be a cognomen of Nanaya rather than an independent deity. However, they were two distinct deities in Neo-Babylonian Uruk, and Uṣur-amāssu's origin as an originally male deity from the circle of Adad is well attested.

The Elamite goddess Narundi, in Mesopotamia best known for her connection to the Sebitti, was possibly associated with Nanaya or Ishtar.

=== Kanisurra and Gazbaba ===
The minor goddess Kanisurra and Gazbaba were regarded as attendants and hairdressers of Nanaya. The latter was associated with the sexual sphere, and her name might be derived from the term kubzu, frequently attested in association with Nanaya. In Šurpu she is described as the "smiling one," which might also point at a connection to eroticism, as smiles are commonly highlighted in Akkadian erotic poetry. Paul-Alain Bealieu notes that association with Nanaya is the best attested characteristic of the otherwise enigmatic Kanisurra, and that her name might therefore simply be an Akkadian or otherwise non-standard pronunciation of ganzer, a Sumerian term for the underworld or its entrance.

It is commonly assumed that both Kanisurra and Gazbaba were daughters of Nanaya. However, as remarked by Gioele Zisa there is however no direct evidence in favor of this interpretation. In the Weidner god list, the line explaining whose daughter Kanisurra is, is not preserved.

In one text from the Maqlû corpus Ishtar, Dumuzi, Nanaya identified as "lady of love") and Kanisurra (identified as "mistress of the witches", bēlet kaššāpāti) were asked to counter the influence of a malevolent spell. In some love incantations, Ishtar, Nanaya, Kanisurra and Gazbaba are invoked together. Another goddess sometimes associated with combinations of them in such texts was Išḫara.

In late texts Kanisurra and Gazbaba are collectively labeled as "Daughters of Ezida". Most groups of such "divine daughters" are known from northern Mesopotamia: Ezida in Borsippa, Esagil in Babylon, Emeslam in Kutha, Edubba in Kish, Ebabbar in Sippar, Eibbi-Anum in Dilbat, and from an unidentified temple of Ningublaga, though examples are also known from Uruk, Nippur, Eridu and even Arbela in Assyria. Based on the fact that daughters of Esagil and of Ezida are identified as members of courts of Sarpanit and of Nanaya respectively, specifically as their hairdressers, it has been proposed by Andrew R. George that these pairs of goddesses were imagined as maidservants in the household of the major deity or deities of a given temple.

=== Marital status ===
In love incantations, Nanaya occurs with an anonymous lover in parallel with Ishtar/Inanna with Dumuzi and Išḫara with almanu, a common noun of uncertain meaning whose proposed translations include "widower," "man without family obligations," or perhaps simply "lover."

In some early sources Nanaya's spouse was the sparsely attested god Muati, though from the Kassite period onward she started to be associated with Nabu instead. She sometimes appeared as part of a trinity in which Nabu's original spouse Tashmetum was also included. In the role of Nabu's spouse Nanaya could be referred to as kalat Esagil, "daughter in law of Esagil", which reflected a connection to Nabu's father Marduk. Both Nanaya and Tashmetum could be called the "queen of Borsippa", though the former eventually overshadowed the latter in that city. Tashmetum however retains the role of spouse of Nabu in most Neo-Assyrian sources, and was worshipped in this role in Kalhu and Nineveh. The evidence of worship of Nanaya in the same areas is inconclusive.

In the first millennium BCE pairing Nabu with Nanaya in some cases, for example in Uruk, represented efforts to subordinate the pantheons of various areas of Mesopotamia to the dominant state ideology of the Babylonian empire, which elevated Marduk and Nabu above other deities.

One late Babylonian litany assigns the epithets of Tashmetum, but also Ninlil and Sarpanit, to Nanaya.

=== Parentage ===
Urash, the city god of Dilbat, could be identified as Nanaya's father. She was sometimes specifically called his firstborn daughter, and she had a connection to his main temple, Eibbi-Anum. This parentage is especially commonly mentioned in emesal texts, where "firstborn of the god Urash" is the most commonly recurring phrase describing her. Another of Urash's children was the underworld deity Lagamal, while his wife was Ninegal. In one neo-Babylonian ritual text, Nanaya and Urash, paired with Ninegal, appear in a single formula.

Texts from the reign of Rim-Sin I and Samsu-Iluna are the oldest sources to identify her as a daughter of Anu, a view later also present in an inscription of Esarhaddon. Paul-Alain Beaulieu speculates that Nanaya developed in a milieu in which An and Inanna were viewed as a couple, and that she was initially envisioned as their daughter. However, as noted by Olga Drewnowska-Rymarz, direct references to Nanaya being regarded as the daughter of Inanna are not common, and it is possible that an epithet indicating closeness between the deities rather than a statement about actual parentage is meant. References to Nanaya as a daughter of Sin, likely a result of syncretism between her and Ishtar are also known, for example from a hymn from the reign of the neo-Assyrian king Sargon II.

=== Other attested connections ===
It is possible that the goddess Ninḫilisu (Sumerian: "graceful lady"), who was worshipped in Ur III Umma where she was served by a gudu_{4} priest, was related to Nanaya, as elsewhere nin-ḫi-li-sù is attested as her epithet.

In a bilingual Akkadian-Amorite lexical list dated to the Old Babylonian period, Nanaya's Amorite counterpart is Pidray, a goddess otherwise only known from later texts from Ugarit, in which she is treated as analogous to the Hurrian goddess Ḫepat instead.

== Worship ==
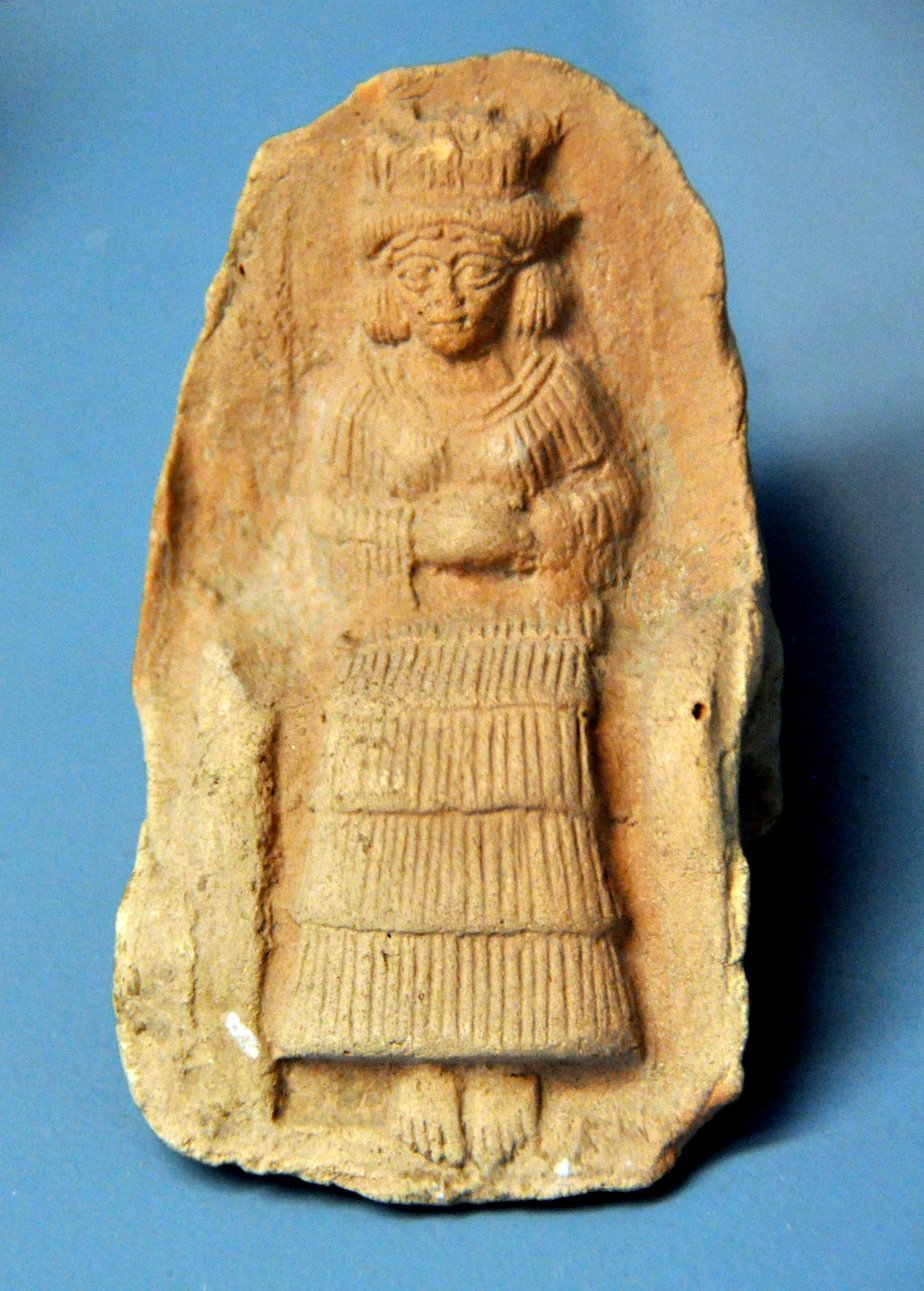
Terracotta plaque of a seated goddess, possibly Nanaya, from Girsu. Kassite period. Ancient Orient Museum, Istanbul

First texts mentioning Nanaya come from the period of Shulgi's reign. She is attested in the administrative texts from Puzrish-Dagan, where she is among the 12 deities who received offerings the most frequently. Records also show that queen Shulgi-simti, one of the wives of Shulgi, made offerings to many foreign or minor deities, among them Nanaya, as well as "Allatum" (the Hurrian goddess Allani), Išḫara, Belet Nagar, Belet-Šuḫnir and Belet-Terraban.

Her principal cult center was Uruk, where she is already mentioned in year names of kings Irdanene and Sin-Eribam from the Old Babylonian period. Her main temple in that city was Emeurur, "the temple which gathers the me." She was also worshipped in a sanctuary within Eanna, the main temple of Inanna, which was called Ehilianna, "house of luxuriance of heaven." It is possible that it was originally built by the Kassite king Nazi-Maruttash. According to an inscription of Esarhaddon, Eriba-Marduk expanded it. It still functioned in the Seleucid period. Another of her temples located in Uruk was Eshahulla, "house of the joyful heart," built by king Sin-kashid. In neo-Babylonian Uruk, Nanaya was second in rank only to Ishtar in the local pantheon. Paul-Alain Bealieu considers them to be the main pair among the city's quintet of major local goddesses, the other three being Bēltu-ša-Rēš (later replaced by Sharrahitu, a goddess identified with Ashratum, the spouse of Amurru), Uṣur-amāssu and Urkayītu (a theos eponymos of Uruk,) As early as in the Middle Babylonian period, Nanaya was called the "queen of Uruk and Eanna," as attested on a kudurru from Larsa. In Neo-Babylonian sources from Uruk, she is called the "queen of Uruk," while Ishtar was the "lady of Uruk."

Nanaya was among the deities taken away from Uruk when Sennacherib sacked the city, though she was subsequently returned to it by Esarhaddon. Ashurbanipal also claimed that he brought her statue back to Uruk, though he instead states that she spent 1635 years in Elam. It is presently unknown what event his inscriptions refer to, and it might merely be a rhetorical figure. If it refers to a historical event, it is possible that it occurred during the reign of Ebi-Eshuh, during which Elamites raided Sippar and perhaps Kish, though due to lack of any sources other than the aforementioned late annals this cannot be conclusively proven.

Offerings made to Nanaya in neo-Babylonian Uruk included dates, barley, emmer, flour, beer, sweets, cakes, fish and meat of oxen, sheep, lambs, ducks, geese and turtle doves.

After the reorganization of the pantheon of Uruk around Anu and Antu in the Achaemenid and Seleucid periods, Nanaya continued to be worshipped and she is attested as one of the deities whose statues were paraded in Uruk in a ritual procession accompanying Ishtar (rather than Antu) during a New Year celebration. The scale of her popular cult in Uruk grew considerably through Seleucid times.

The name Eshahulla, known from Uruk, was applied to a temple in Larsa built by Kudur-Mabuk and his son Rim-Sin I, which seemingly was also a temple of Inanna, unless two temples with the same name existed in the same city. In Larsa, Nanaya was one of the foremost deities, next to Utu (the city's tutelary god), Inanna, Ishkur and Nergal. Joint offerings to Inanna and Nanaya of Larsa are known from a number of documents. She is also attested as one member of a trinity whose other two members were Innanna and Ninsianna, in which Inanna's functions were seemingly split between the three goddesses, with Nanaya being allotted the role of the love goddess.

In offering lists from the archives of the First Dynasty of Sealand Nanaya appears alongside various hypostases of Inanna, including Inanna of Larsa, though the latter could also be associated with the rainbow goddess Manzat instead. In a single case, Nanaya is also accompanied by Kanisurra in an offering list.

A temple of Nanaya built by Lipit-Ishtar existed in Isin. The oldest recorded hymn dedicated to her also comes from this city. However, there is overall less evidence for the worship of Nanaya in Isin than in Larsa, as the kings of Isin apparently favored the goddesses Ninisina and Ninsianna instead.

In Babylon Nanaya is attested for the first time during the reign of Sumulael, who ordered statues of her and of Inanna to be fashioned in his twenty sixth year on the throne. Later she was worshipped in the Eturkalamma, "house, cattle pen of the land," built by Hammurabi for deities of Uruk - Inanna, Nanaya, Anu and Kanisurra, and later on in the temples Emeurur and Eurshaba, "house, oracle of the heart." A temple named Eurshaba existed in Borsippa too, though Nanaya was worshipped in a chapel in Ezida, the temple of Nabu as well. A late ritual text describes the procession undertaken by Nanaya, her court and various other deities from Borsippa to Kish. A festival celebrating the marriage of Nanaya and Nabu is still attested from Borsippa from Seleucid times. A unique writing of Nanaya's name, ^{d}NIN.KA.LI, is known from documents related to it.

In the late Old Babylonian period the cult of Nanaya was also introduced to Kish, where the clergy of Uruk found refuge after abandoning the temporarily destroyed city.

Temples of Nanaya are also attested from Kazallu (Eshahulla, "house of the happy heart"), and from Nerebtum, though the name of the latter is not known, and it is simply called e ^{d}Na-na-a-a in known texts.

In Nippur Nanaya had no temple of her own, though offerings to her are attested from a temple of Ninurta located there.

It is possible that Nanaya was worshipped in Der, though the evidence is limited to a list of deities of that city taken away by Shamshi-Adad V during his fifth campaign against Babylonia. Some evidence also exists for offerings made to her in Sippar and in Dur-Kurigalzu.

In Assur, there was a gate named in honor of Nanaya and Uṣur-amāssu. However, it is uncertain if her cult had much presence in northern Mesopotamia.

There is a lot of evidence for private worship of Nanaya, including seals with the phrase "servant of Nanaya" seemingly owned by many women. In incantations related to love (for example asking for feelings to be returned) she is attested as early as in the Ur III and Old Babylonian periods. Numerous theophoric names are attested as well. However, none of them come from the Ur III period, and in the Old Babylonian period they are limited to only a few cities, including Dilbat, Kish, Sippar, Larsa, Ur and most likely Uruk. Over two thirds of the known Old Babylonian names come from the first two of these settlements alone. Both men and women with such names are listed in records. In the neo-Babylonian period, Nanaya was the deity most commonly present in theophoric names of women, with 106 individual women and 52 different names attested. Examples include: Qis-Nanaya ("Gift of Nanaya), Nanaja-šamhat ("Nanaya is the most beautiful"), Nanaya-ilu ("my deity Nanaya"). One historically notable individual bearing such a name was Ḫunnubat-Nanaya, daughter of Babylonian king Melišipak (ca. 1186-1172 BCE), depicted alongside her father and the goddess on a famous kudurru. Another was Iddin-Nanaya, a sanga priest of this goddess active during the reign of king Irdanene of Uruk, apparently responsible for various misdeeds, including the removal of a star symbol from the doors of the Nanaya temple.

=== Outside Mesopotamia ===
In offering lists from Ur III period Mari, a goddess named ^{d}Nin-Na-na-a, seemingly Nanaya with the determinative "lady" (nin) added to her name, appears in among gods introduced from Uruk, alongside Ninshubur, Dumuzi and (Nin-)Bizila. Additionally, a deity of uncertain identity known from Mari and Ḫana, Nanni, is more likely to be connected to Nanaya than Nanna, as the name is grammatically feminine. In the west Nanaya is also attested in Emar, though only in a god list.

The only known reference to worship of Nanaya among the Hittites comes from a single document mentioning her as the goddess of the town Malidaskuriya in the district of Durmitta, located in the proximity of the middle of the river Kızılırmak. It has been proposed that her worship in that location was a relic of Old Assyrian practices. Possible theophoric names are known from Hittite sources too.

Nanaya was also worshipped in Susa in Elam, where she is particularly well attested in Seleucid times. It is uncertain at which point was she introduced to this city, though it has been proposed her arrival in the local pantheon was connected with the theft of her statue during a raid. Greek authors regarded her as the main goddess of Susa.

== Literature ==
A bilingual Sumero-Akkadian hymn to Nanaya from the first millennium BCE, written in the first person as a self-laudation, describes many other goddesses as manifestations of her, in line with the syncretic tendencies typical for the literature of this time period. Each of them is listed alongside a specific location. Among the goddesses mentioned are Damkina (Eridu and Kullaba), Ninlil (Nippur), Išḫara, Bau (both in Kish), Sarpanit (in Babylon), Shala (in Karkar), Annunitum (in Agade), Mammitum (in Kutha), Manzat (in Der), a number of goddesses whose names are not preserved, as well as various forms of Ishtar, including Ishtar of Babylon (described as bearded), Ishtar of Daduni and Ishtar of Uruk. Nanaya herself is assigned two cities, Borsippa and Sippar. No mention is made of Tashmetum. The purpose of this composition was most likely elevation of Nanaya above the other goddesses.

In a mythical explanation of the rites of Egashankalamma (the temple of the Assyrian Ishtar of Arbela) pertaining to the mourning of Ishtaran's death, Nanaya is described as a goddess who provides Bel with an iron arrows.

In the Hurrian tale of Appu six deities are listed alongside the cities where they were worshipped, among them Marduk, Shaushka and Nanaya, whose cult center in this text is Kiššina. Joan Goodnick Westenholz considers it to be an unidentified location, but Volkert Haas assumes the name might be derived from Kish.

== Later relevance ==
In a papyrus from Achaemenid Egypt the formula "Nanaya of Eanna will bless you" occurs. In the following Hellenic period, her cult spread to various distant locations, including Armenia, Sogdia and Bactria, though it has been pointed out that the goddess in mention was the result of a process of Hellenistic syncretism and it is difficult to tell which of her features had their origin in the Mesopotamian image of Nanaya. It has been proposed that Parthian coinage was in part responsible for her spread, though no known coins explicitly identify any figures depicted on them as her. The first attested reference to Nanaya in Bactria is a coin of Yuezhi ruler Sapadbizes. Later she occurs in an inscription of Kushan emperor Kanishka, who proclaimed that he received kingship from her. She also appears on Kushan coins. Her name is always spelled as "Nanaia" in Greek, but as "Nana" in Bactrian. The iconography associated with her is entirely Hellenic in origin, rather than Mesopotamian, though her position as a giver of kingship might be derived from Mesopotamian tradition.

Nanaya is mentioned in the Second Book of Maccabees. She also appears in Acts of Mar Mu'ain, according to which Sasanian king Shapur II ordered the eponymous Syriac saint to make offerings to various deities, including her. Dedications to Nanaya, written in Pahlavi scripts, appear on some jewelry from the Sasanian period. However, there is no evidence that the rulers from this dynasty were involved in her cult, similar evidence is also lacking for the Achaemenid emperors from the earlier period of Persian history.

The last Mesopotamian reference to Nanaya appears in a Mandean spell from Nippur dated to the fifth or sixth century in which she appears alongside Shamash, Sin, Bel and Nergal, though all of these deities, including her, appear to be treated as male in this case, indicating that the precise identity of the figures invoked was already forgotten.

Some late references to a goddess partially derived from Nanaya are known from Sogdia, where a Greek and Kushan-influenced version of her was worshipped in Panjakent as late as in the eighth century. Her depictions in Sogdian art have no clear forerunners in earlier tradition, and appear to be based on four-armed Mahayana Buddhist figures.

Syriac scholar Bar Bahlul, active around the year 1000, in his Syriac-Arabic dictionary defined Nanaya as a name which Arabs purportedly applied to the planet Venus. This is the last known pre-modern reference to Nanaya.
