= Paul-Alain Beaulieu =

Canadian Assyriologist

Paul-Alain Beaulieu is a Canadian Assyriologist, a Professor of Near and Middle Eastern Civilizations at the University of Toronto.

Beaulieu earned a master's degree from the Université de Montréal in 1980 under the supervision of Marcel Leibovici, and a Ph.D. from Yale University in 1985. He was an assistant and subsequently associate professor at Harvard University before joining the faculty at Toronto.

== Books ==
Beaulieu is the author of:

- L'introduction du cheval et du char de guerre au Proche-Orient au IIe millénaire av. J.C. (Masters thesis, Université de Montréal, 1980).
- The Reign of Nabonidus, King of Babylon, 556–539 B.C. (Ph.D. thesis, Yale University, 1989, and Yale Near Eastern researches 10, Yale University Press, 1989, ISBN 978-0-300-04314-3). This was the first book in 60 years about Nabonidus, who was himself something of an archaeologist. In contrast to the previous book by Raymond P. Dougherty, Beaulieu's book downplays the role of Nabonidus' heterodox religious beliefs in causing his split rule with his son Belshazzar, instead highlighting political and economic factors. Beaulieu also compares the historical documents on Nabonidus' rule with the accounts of the same time in the Book of Daniel.
- Late Babylonian Texts in the Nies Babylonian Collection, Vol. 1 (CDL Press, 1994, ISBN 978-1-883053-04-8).
- Legal and Administrative Texts from the Reign of Nabonidus (Yale oriental series: Babylonian texts 19, Yale University Press, 2000, ISBN 978-0-300-05770-6). This book describes some 313 tablets from Uruk, in the collections of Yale University. They include letters on religious matters, land transfers, sales contracts, and legal documents.
- The Pantheon of Uruk During the Neo-Babylonian Period (Cuneiform Monographs 23, Leiden & Boston: Brill/Styx, 2003, ISBN 978-90-04-13024-1). Reviewer Robert D. Biggs writes that "this is a major contribution to the study of ancient Mesopotamia" while M. A. Dandamayev calls it "an enormous step in the study of Babylonian religion". It includes chapters on the clothing ceremony, offering lists, and individual gods and their companions, and focuses particular attention on Ishtar, the "lady of Uruk".
- A History of Babylon (John Wiley & Sons, 2011, ISBN 978-1-4051-8898-2).
- The Cuneiform Uranology Texts (Paul-Alain Beaulieu, Eckart Frahm, Wayne Horowitz and John Steele). Transactions of the American Philosophical Society. Published By: American Philosophical Society 2018

== See also ==
- Cylinder of Nabonidus
