= Andrew R. George =

British academic (born 1955)

- Born: 1955 (age 70–71)
- Occupation: Academic
- Known for: Edition and translation of the Epic of Gilgamesh

Academic background
- Education: University of Birmingham; University of London
- Thesis: Babylonian Topographic Texts (1992)
- Doctoral advisor: Wilfred G. Lambert

Academic work
- Discipline: Babylonian
- Institutions: School of Oriental and African Studies, University of London

Andrew R. George (born 1955) is a British Assyriologist and academic best known for his edition and translation of the Epic of Gilgamesh. Andrew George is Professor of Babylonian, Department of the Languages and Cultures of Near and Middle East at the School of Oriental and African Studies, University of London.

== Biography ==
Andrew George studied Assyriology at the University of Birmingham (1973–79). In 1985 he presented his doctoral thesis, Babylonian Topographic Texts, at the University of London under the direction of Professor Wilfred G. Lambert. Since 1983 he has been a Lecturer in Akkadian and Sumerian Language and Literature at the School of Oriental and African Studies (SOAS), University of London. Afterwards he started teaching Babylonian Language and Literature at that University.

His best-known book is a translation of The Epic of Gilgamesh for Penguin Classics (2000).

He has been elected Honorary Member of the American Oriental Society (2012). He is a former Visiting Professor at the Heidelberg University (2000), Member of the prestigious Institute for Advanced Study in Princeton (2004-2005) and Research Associate at Rikkyo University, Tokyo (2009).

== Books ==
- House Most High: The Temples of Ancient Mesopotamia (Mesopotamian Civilizations, Vol 5), Eisenbrauns, 1993, ISBN 0-931464-80-3
- The Epic of Gilgamesh: The Babylonian Epic Poem and Other Texts in Akkadian and Sumerian, 228pp, London: Allen Lane The Penguin Press 1999, London: Penguin Books 2000 ISBN 0-14-044721-0.
- The Babylonian Gilgamesh Epic: Critical Edition and Cuneiform Texts, 996pp, Oxford University Press (England) (2003) ISBN 0-19-814922-0.
- Babylonian Literary Texts (2009), Cuneiform Royal Inscriptions (2011), Babylonian Divinatory Texts (2013) and Assyrian Archival Documents in the Schøyen Collection (2017), Capital Decisions Ltd.

== Co-Editor of Journal ==
From 1994 to 2011 Andrew R. George was co-editor of the archaeological journal Iraq.
