= Ama-arḫuš =

Mesopotamian deity, or title of Gula

- Healing goddess or epithet highlighting compassion
- Major cult center: Uruk

Ama-arḫuš(𒂼𒃣 or 𒂼𒉦) was a Mesopotamian goddess associated with compassion and healing or epithet of goddesses designating them as compassionate.

== Name and character ==
Ama-arḫuš can be translated from Sumerian as "compassionate mother". The variant Nin-ama-arḫuššu, "lady compassionate mother", is also attested. Sporadic addition of the sign NIN to preexisting names of deities as a prefix is a well attested phenomenon in Mesopotamian sources, with other examples including Nin-Aya, Nin-Aruru and Nin-Azimua. An Akkadian phrase analogous to Ama-arḫuš is also known, ummu rēmi or rēmēnītu. Dina Katz notes that the term arḫuš had a broad meaning, referring to emotions such as pity, empathy, and mercy, but that at the same time it occurs primarily in texts involving deities. In addition to its literal meaning, the name Ama-arḫuš was also meant to highlight a connection to healing and midwifery, Since arḫuš also had meaning "uterus", Irene Sibbing-Plantholt argues that it can be interpreted as an indication of "knowledge of the female body". Katz argues that the signs used to render it logographically, GA_{2}✕SAL(𒂷 𒊩) , respectively "house" and "vulva", might indicate that the meaning "uterus" (or perhaps "placenta") was primary, and using it to designate an emotion was a secondary development.

== As an epithet ==
Ama-arḫuš is attested as an epithet of Ninisina in the hymn Ninisina D from the second millennium BCE, and continued to be used to describe her in the first millennium BCE. In addition to her, Bau and in the first millennium BCE Gula and Ninkarrak as well, could be addressed with the same title. In the so-called Great Star List, an astronomical compendium known from a number of Neo-Assyrian and Neo-Babylonian fragments, Ama-arḫuš is one of the "seven Gulas" alongside Bau, Ninšudda, Dukurgal, Gunura, Ninasag and Nin-umma-siga, and she is addressed as "Gula of the temple E-ešbar". In the god list An = Anum, the poorly attested minor deity Enanun is described as the ama-arḫuš of Gula. The word arḫuš itself was used as an epithet or component of epithets of numerous other deities, both male and female, for example Azimua, Ninmah or Nanna, while the galla demons were characterized as lacking it.

== Worship ==
Ama-arḫuš was worshiped in Uruk, where she is attested in texts from the Seleucid period as one of the newly introduced deities, alongside Amasagnudi, Šarrāḫītu and others. She is attested in the theophoric names Arad-Ama-arḫuš (masculine) and Amat-Ama-arḫuš (masculine), which occur in texts from between 211 and 149 BCE; four of the six known individuals bearing each of them belonged to local conservative aristocratic families. The name otherwise does not occur in the Mesopotamian onomasticon. Julia Krul suggests that since Gula is absent from late theophoric names from this city, despite being actively worshiped in it, it is possible that Ama-arḫuš was viewed as her manifestation or synonym, as she is not otherwise attested in Uruk. Identification with Gula is also considered a possibility by Irene Sibbing-Plantholt.
