= Sukkal =

Mesopotamian administrative office and type of deity

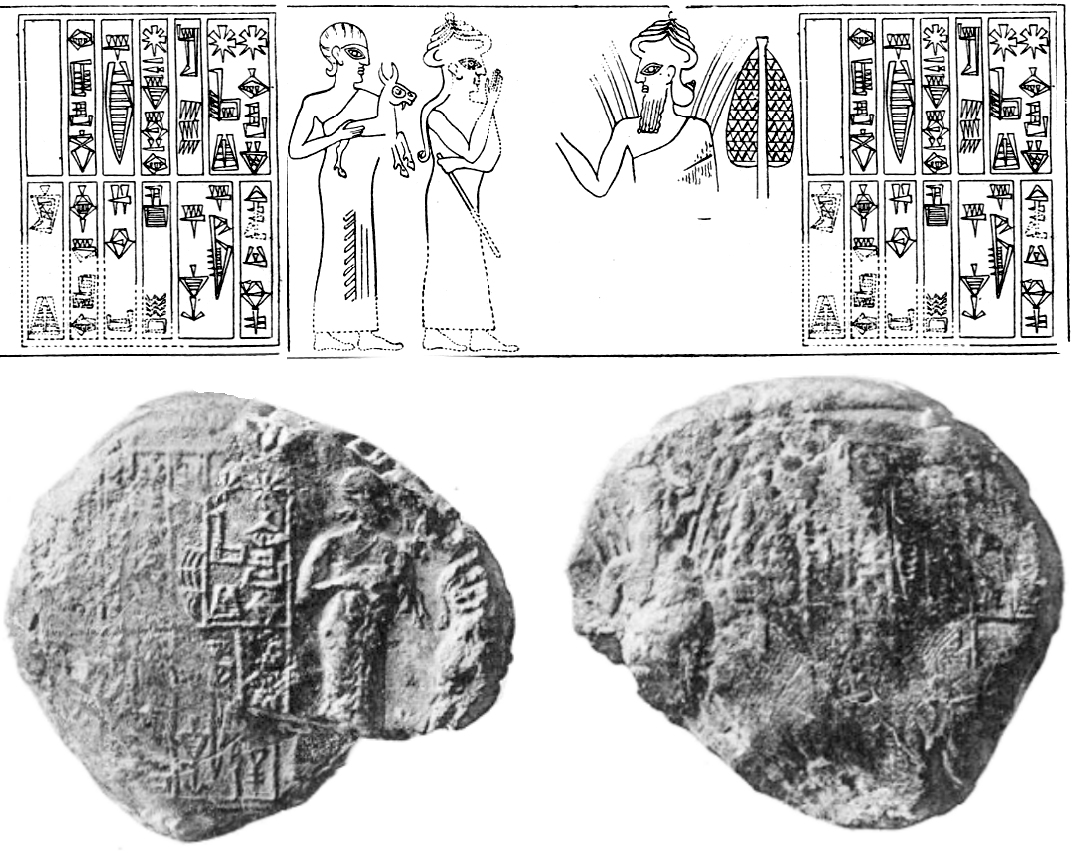
A seal of Lugal-ushumgal as servant of Naram-Sin, possibly depicting Ninshubur, the archetypal sukkal, carrying a staff, the attribute of this class of deities

Sukkal (conventionally translated from Sumerian as "vizier") was a term which could denote both a type of official and a class of deities in ancient Mesopotamia. The historical sukkals were responsible for overseeing the execution of various commands of the kings and acted as diplomatic envoys and translators for foreign dignitaries. The deities referred to as sukkals fulfilled a similar role in mythology, acting as servants, advisors and envoys of the main gods of the Mesopotamian pantheon, such as Enlil or Inanna. The best known sukkal is the goddess Ninshubur. In art, they were depicted carrying staves, most likely understood as their attribute. They could function as intercessory deities, believed to mediate between worshipers and the major gods.

The office sukkal is also known from various areas to the west and east of Mesopotamia, including the Hurrian kingdom Arrapḫa, Syrian Alalakh and Mari and Elam under the rule of the Sukkalmah Dynasty, while the concept of divine sukkals was incorporated into Hurrian religion, in which major gods such as Kumarbi or Hebat commonly appear in company of their sukkals, similar to their Mesopotamian counterparts.

== The office of sukkal ==
The word sukkal (Akkadian: sukkallu) has Sumerian origin and at first denoted a class of human officials, responsible for the implementation of the commands of the king. Translations found in literature include "vizier", "secretary", and "chancellor." Tonia Sharlach notes that "vizier" is considered to be the standard translation today. The same word is also conventionally employed as a translation of the name of another, unrelated, office, badalum, used in northern Syrian cities, such as Harran and Abarsal, in the third millennium BCE. It is also the conventional term for the head of the Eblaite administration, most likely referred to as lugal sa-za. The word sukkal is attested in Eblaite documents, but seemingly designates a type of clergyman instead.

This office of sukkal is also known from outside southern Mesopotamia, for example from Mari from Alalakh in western Syria, from the Hurrian kingdom of Arrapḫa in northeastern Mesopotamia, and from Elam. At least in southern Mesopotamia and Mari, a sukkal served as an intermediary between the royal administration and foreign envoys. There is evidence that they often knew more than one language and acted as translators, and some were likely foreigners or children of foreigners who settled in Mesopotamia. In some cases, a specific foreign dignitary was always mentioned alongside the same local sukkal accompanying him.

A related office, known from Early Dynastic Girsu and from the administrative texts of the Third Dynasty of Ur, was that of the sukkalmah (GAL.SUKKAL, sukkalmaḫḫu). Tonia Sharlach proposes this term should be understood as the equivalent of a modern secretary of state. A sukkalmah was in charge of a number of sukkals. In Elam, this term was adopted as a royal title, possibly because the sukkalmahs of the Ur III state, who resides in Lagash, close to Elamite territory, were in charge of the territories surrounding Susa when the state they served reached its maximal extent. The so-called Sukkalmah Dynasty ruled over Elam in the early second millennium BCE.

Some lexical texts explain sukkal as pašišu, "salve priest", though the reason behind the equation of these two terms is not known.

== Sukkal as a type of deities ==
In Mesopotamian religion, some deities were designated as sukkals and functioned as a divine counterpart of the human officials. Due to more direct evidence present in myths compared to economic and administrative texts, their functions are better known than these of their human namesakes. A sukkal was the highest-ranked member of a deity's court, and in some cases in god lists could appear even before their children. At the same time, not every servant deity was a sukkal. Three distinct classes of divine servants can be found in various documents: advisers and representatives (including the sukkal), deities dealing with the personal needs of a god, and finally those tasked with upkeep of their household, such as divine cooks or gardeners. In myths, sukkals act both as traveling envoys of their masters, and as their advisors at home. Wisdom was frequently regarded as a trait of this class of deities. While most deities had courtiers, usually only these whose position in the pantheon was well established had sukkals, and sukkals of the major city gods were likely the oldest deities of this type. Instances of a sukkal having a sukkal of their own, while known, should be regarded as an anomaly according to Richard L. Litke. For example, Niĝgina, a sukkal of the sun god Utu, had her own sukkal, as did Alammuš, the sukkal of the moon god Nanna.

The goddess Ninshubur is regarded by Assyriologists as "the earliest and most important" sukkal, the "archetypal vizier of the gods."

The attribute associated with all sukkals was a staff. Papsukkal could be called bēl ḫaṭṭi, "lord of the staff." Similarly, Nuska bore the Sumerian epithet en-ĝidri, "lord of the scepter." Alla, Isimud and Ninshubur were depicted holding staffs too. One possible depiction of Ninshubur carrying a staff is present on the seal of Lugal-ushumgal, governor of Lagash during the reigns of Naram-Sin of Akkad and his son Shar-Kali-Sharri. A sukkal was expected to walk in front of their master, leading the way with their staff. Sukkals could be associated with doors as well. In literary texts, they could be tasked with screening visitors who wanted to see their master.

The title of sukkalmaḫ could be applied to divine sukkals, though there is no evidence that a divine sukkalmaḫ was in charge of regular sukkals, and in some cases a deity had multiple sukkals but none of them was referred as a sukkalmaḫ, while in other a sukkalmaḫ was the only sukkal of their master. Most likely addressing a deity as a sukkalmaḫ was only meant to highlight the high position of their master in the pantheon. Deities addressed as sukkalmaḫs include Nuska (the sukkal of Enlil), Ara (one of the two sukkals of Enki), Ninpirig (one of the sukkals of Utu), Ninshubur (the sukkal of Inanna) and Alammuš (the sukkal of Nanna). A further title used to describe some of the divine sukkals was SAL.ḪÚB_{2}. In most of the texts where this word is attested, it occurs in parallel with "sukkal." It only ever designates gods, not human officials, and only a handful of attestations are known. It is assumed that it referred to a sukkal particularly emotionally close to their master. Deities referred to this way include Ninshubur (both male and female), Bunene, Ninpirig, Nabu and Muduggasa'a (in a bilingual text where he occurs as the equivalent of the former), and Innimanizi. The number of references to each of them is not equal, and only Ninshubur is referred to as SAL.ḪÚB_{2} more than once or twice, with seven recorded instances currently known. In one case, she was labeled as the "beloved SAL.ḪÚB_{2} of Inanna," and appears right after Dumuzi in an enumeration of deities associated with her mistress, before some of her family members, for example her sister in law Geshtinanna. In some cases, terms such as MUNUS.SUKKAL (for example in the case of Sililitum) or nin-sukkal (in the case of Ninshubur and Amasagnudi) was used to indicate a sukkal was female.

It has been argued that many sukkals simply represented the effect of their masters' actions: the fire god Gibil was served by a deified flame, Nablum, while the weather god Ishkur by a deified lightning, Nimgir. Other seem to be personifications of specific commands, for example Eturammi ("do not slacken"), Nēr-ē-tagmil ("kill, spare not") or Ugur ("destroy"). However, Frans Wiggermann points out that neither explanation is suitable for the sukkals of particularly well established deities: Ninshubur, Nuska, Bunene, Isimud and Alammuš, whose character was independent from that of their masters.

It is sometimes argued that a sukkal had to match the gender for their master. However, Namtar, Ereshkigal's sukkal, was male. The sukkal of the medicine goddess Gula, Urmašum, was a male deity too. Amasagnudi, regarded as a goddess, appears as the sukkal of Anu in a single lexical text.

Sukkals could act as intercessory deities, leading to comparisons between them and another class of minor deities, lamma, in modern scholarship. Both of them could be depicted in similar scenes on cylinder seals, leading a human visitor to their divine master. The goddess Lammašaga was identified both as a sukkal and a lamma. A third class of deities involved in intercession were wives of major gods, and on occasion comparisons are made between them and sukkals too, for example the role of a mediator between a major deity and worshipers played by Ninshubur in the cult of Inanna has been compared to that played by the spouses of other major gods, Aya in the cult of Shamash or Shala in Adad's.

Sukkals have also been compared to angels in comparative scholarship, and some researchers, for example Jan van Dijk and Frans Wiggermann, tentatively label study of sukkals as "Sumerian angelology." Similarly, it has been argued that the nature of Lamma deities can be compared to modern idea of guardian angels.

== List of sukkals ==
Name	Corresponding major deity	Details
Alla Alla-Gula	Ningishzida	Alla has been described as a "little known deity with underworld connections." He could be referred to with the epithet Lugal-sapar, "lord of the net." Nets are well attested as a weapon of gods in Mesopotamian literature. He could be equated with Dumuzi. He is also attested in lists of so-called "seven conquered Enlils," deities associated with Enmesharra. He was depicted as a bald, beardless man, without the horned crown associated with divinity. Alla should not be confused with Allatum, the Mesopotamian name of Hurrian goddess Allani.
Alammuš	Sin/Nanna	Alammuš was closely associated with the cattle god Ningublaga and the two of them could be referred to as twins. They corresponded to the constellation called "Little Twins" in Mesopotamian astronomy. In addition to acting as Nanna's sukkal, Alammuš had a sukkal of his own. Two writings of the latter deity's name are known, ^{d}Uru_{3}.gal and ^{d}Uru_{x}(EN).gal.
Amasagnudi	Anu	Amasagnudi was a goddess who was the sukkal of Anu according to a single lexical text from the Old Babylonian period. Her name means "mother who cannot be pushed aside." She was the wife of Papsukkal according to the god list An = Anum and sources from Seleucid Uruk, but very few attestations of her come from before the Seleucid period.
Ara	Enki	Ara (^{d}ŠA) is attested as the sukkalmaḫ of Enki in the god list An = Anum. According to sources from the Old Babylonian period, she was a female deity, but later she was conflated with Isimud, who was male.
Bašmu	Tishpak	Bašmu shared his name with a type of serpentine mythical creature. However, on cylinder seals a god who might be Tishpak is accompanied by a fully anthropomorphic attendant deity, possibly indicating that the name Bašmu in this case was only meant to point at the connection between this god and snakes.
Belet-Seri	Ereshkigal	Julia Krul proposes that in Hellenistic Uruk Belet-Seri came to be seen as the vizier of Ereshkigal and perhaps Anu, as she received offerings alongside Papsukkal, well attested in such a role.
Bizilla	Ninlil	The tradition in which Bizilla was a sukkal of Ninlil, the wife of Enlil, is known from texts dealing with Ḫursaĝkalama. In other sources, she was associated with Nanaya and Kanisurra. It is also assumed that she occurs in the court of Manungal in some sources, though Jeremiah Peterson considers it possible that there might have been two deities with similar names, one associated with Manungal and the other with Nanaya.
Bunene Papnunna	Utu/Shamash	In Sippar, Bunene was regarded as the husband of Shamash's and Aya's daughter, the dream goddess Mamu (also spelled Mamud). According to the so-called Canonical Temple List, under the name Papnunna he was worshiped in his own temple, the E-kašbarsummu, "house which gives decisions."
Dikum	Ninegal	The name Dikum, while Akkadian, is derived from Sumerian diku, "judge," and on this basis it has been argued that the deity was likely regarded as responsible for administration of justice on behalf of Ninegal.
Edinmugi	Šumugan	Edinmugi (Sumerian: "he secured the plains") is attested as the sukkal of Šumugan in a seal inscription from Lagash. Šumugan is himself addressed as a sukkal in an inscription of Gudea and as a sukkalmaḫ in a bilingual hymn to Utu known from a copy from Hattusa.
Eturammi Eturame	Birtum	Eturammi's name means "do not slacken." His master Birtum was a deification of fetters and the husband of the Manungal, the goddess of prisons.
Ili-mīšar Mišaru?	Imzuanna	Ili-mīšar, the sukkal of Imzuanna, is known from the god list An = Anum. It has been proposed that he can be identified with Mišaru, a son of Adad. His mistress was the wife of Lugal-Marada, the city god of Marad. Marten Stol argues that Ili-mīšar was instead one of the two sukkals of the latter, the other being Lugal-mea.
Ilabrat	Anu	Ilabrat was a god who either came to be associated with masculine Ninshubur, or whose name was written with Ninshubur's, treated as a logogram. He was the sukkal of Anu, and appears in this role in the myth of Adapa.
Inimmanizi	Ninurta	Inimmanizi means "his word is true" in Sumerian and initially was a common given name, but from the Old Babylonian period onward it is attested as the name of the sukkal of Ninurta. He was worshiped in Ninurta's temple Ešmueša in Nippur. According to the god list An = Anum he had a brother, Ninkarnunna, and a wife, Lamma, but according to Wilfred G. Lambert it seems that in some copies Ninkarnunna is a female deity and Inimmanizi's wife, rather than brother.
Ipahum Ippu	Ningishzida, possibly originally Ninazu	Iphaum was a viper god. While Ninazu had no sukkal of his own in any major god lists, Frans Wiggermann proposes that Ipahum was initially associated with him, rather than with his son Ningishzida.
Ipte-bit Ipte-bitam	Urash	Ipte-bit means "he opened the temple." He was worshiped in Dilbat. An incantation from Der lists him alongside Urash's son Lagamal. A neo-Babylonian text refers to Ipte-bit as a female deity, one of the two "daughters of E-ibbi-Anni," the temple of Urash.
Iqbi-damiq	Kittum	Iqbi-damiq's name means "she said 'it is fine!'" Wilfred G. Lambert's earlier translation, "he spoke, it is pleasant," presumed Iqbi-damiq was male. However, a text referring to her as a "daughter" is now known. She is also attested in the god list An = Anum and in Šurpu. An illness called "hand of Iqbi-damiq" is mentioned in one medical text alongside "hand of Nanaya" and "hand of Kanisurra."
Ishum	Nergal	Ishum replaced Ugur, the original sukkal of Nergal, after the Old Babylonian period. He was regarded as a divine night watchman.
Isimud Usmu	Enki/Ea	The form Isimu(d) was Sumerian, while Usmu - Akkadian. He was depicted with two faces. The Akkadian word usumia meant "two-faced," and was likely connected with the name of this god at least through a folk etymology.
Kakka	Anu, Anshar	Kakka acts as the sukkal of Anu in the myth Nergal and Ereshkigal, but as the sukkal of Anshar in Enūma Eliš. A female deity also named Kakka was also worshiped in Mari as a healing goddess associated with Ninkarrak and Ninshubur.
Kittum Niĝgina	Utu/Shamash	The position of Kittum in the court of Shamash varies between that of the oldest daughter and a sukkal between individual copies of the god list An = Anum. Her Sumerian counterpart was Niĝgina, whose name has the same meaning, "truth." In An = Anum Kittum is instead male and a brother of Niĝgina. She had a sukkal of her own, Iqbi-damiq.
Lammašaga	Bau	Lammašaga's name means "good lamma," lamma being a type of minor protective deity compared to a guardian angel. Hymns dedicated to her are known.
Lugal-ḫegalla	Lugalbanda	Lugal-ḫegalla means "lord of abundance," and in addition to being the name of Lugalbanda's sukkal is also attested as a title of Adad and as an ordinary given name.
Lugal-mea	Lugal-Marada	Wilfred G. Lambert proposed identifying Lugal-mea with Lugal-me, a disease demon representing the bennu disease, though he notes that both names were also ordinary given names in the third millennium BCE.
Lugal-namtarra	Shamash	Lugal-namtarra was a sparsely attested deity possibly analogous to Namtar. In documents from the archives of the First Dynasty of Sealand, he appears alongside the deity ^{d}SUKKAL. Odette Boivin proposes that he functioned as a sukkal of Shamash during his nightly journey through the underworld, while ^{d}SUKKAL fulfilled the same role during the day. None of Shamash's sukkals known from other sources are present in the Sealand texts.
Mār-bīti	Nabu	Mār-bīti, a god originally associated with the cities of Der and Malgium, is described as the ^{lú}SUKKAL GAL-u ša ^{d}MUATI, "great vizier of Nabu", in a single text from Kalhu.
ME-ḫursag Išib-ḫursag?	Nin-Muru	Manfred Krebernik proposes that the reading išib for the first sign of the name of the sukkal of Nin-Muru, the wife of Ninkilim. Both Nin-Muru and her husband were worshiped in Muru, originally associated with Ningirima.
Meme	Ningal	Meme, written ^{d}ME^{kà-kà}ME, occurs as the sukkal of Ningal in the god list An = Anum. Richard L. Litke points out that the gloss is unlikely to indicate an otherwise unknown pronunciation of the sign ME, and proposes that an alternate version of the list had Kakka in the role of Ningal's sukkal. He assumes the deity meant is the same one who the list equates with Ninkarrak, distinct from the male messenger god. A medicine goddess named Kakka is attested in theophoric names from Mari.
Muduggasa'a	Asalluhi	Muduggasa'a means "called with good name." Late texts attest that similar to how Asalluhi was conflated with Marduk, his sukkal was conflated with Nabu. Wilfred G. Lambert goes as far as proposing that Nabu was selected by ancient theologians for the role of Marduk's sukkal because his name had similar meaning to Muduggasa'a's, as it is derived from nabi'um, "called one."
Mummu	Apsu	The name Mummu is most likely derived from the Akkadian word mummu, a loanword from Sumerian ùmun, meaning "skill" or "wisdom," which could function as an epithet of many deities. The tradition presenting Mummu as a sukkal might have originated from the Enūma Eliš, and it is also known from scholarly lists of defeated mythical beings. In this myth, his origin is not explained.
Nablum	Gibil	Nablum was the deification of flames. He is attested as the sukkal of the fire god Gibil in the god list An = Anum.
Nabu	Marduk	The tradition according to which Nabu was Marduk's sukkal is older than that presenting them as son and father. In the earliest available sources, dating to the Old Babylonian period, he was not yet addressed as a sukkal, but instead as a scribe (dubsar), but he is already directly called a sukkal in the god list An = Anum.
Namtar	Ereshkigal, sporadically Nergal	Namtar's name means "fate." He is first attested as a personified deity in the Old Babylonian period, and in literary texts often appears alongside Ereshkigal as a god of the underworld. His mother was usually the goddess Mardula'anki, but in a single incantation he is instead a son of Ereshkigal and Enlil. He could also function as a disease demon.
Nēr-ē-tagmil	Id	Nēr-ē-tagmil means "kill, spare not." His master, Id, was a river god associated with judgment. He is known from the god list An = Anum, from a single fragment of an incantation, and from an inscription of Shamshi-Adad V, which identifies him as one of the gods worshiped in Der. A single text identifies the name Nēr-ē-tagmil as a title of Nergal rather than a distinct deity.
Nigzida and Nigsisa	Utu/Shamash	The names Nigzida and Nigsisa mean "law" and "order," respectively. They are identified as the "vizier of the left" and "vizier of the right" in the god list An = Anum. Nigzida could be equated with Niggina, another goddess regarded as the sun god's sukkal.
Nimgir	Ishkur/Adad	Nimgir was the deification of lightning. A single text (KAV 64) equates him with Martu. An Old Babylonian eršemma song mentions a nameless sukkal of Ishkur in passing.
Nindimgul	Nungal	The name Nindimgul means "lady/lord mooring pole." This deity was likely female. She appears to play the role of a prosecutor in the Hymn to Nungal.
Ninĝidru inĝešduru	Sud	Ninĝidru fulfills the role of a sukkal in a hymn to Sud, the tutelary goddess of Shuruppak, where her task is said to be receiving the visitors arriving in the temple of her mistress. She is mentioned alongside Sud in a fragment of an inscription from Shuruppak from the Sargonic period as well. Christopher Metcalf refers to Ninĝidru as a male deity, but other authors consider her to be a goddess. It is possible she was the deification of the sceptre, and in known text she appears in association with Ninmena, the deification of the crown.
Ninpirig	Utu/Shamash	While Utu had multiple sukkals, only Ninpirig was referred to as his sukkalmaḫ. It has been proposed that his name might hint at a connection with light. He is attested in multiple theophoric names, chiefly from Sippar. Some researchers, including Antoine Cavigneaux and Manfred Krebernik, consider the reading of the second element of his name to be uncertain due to variable orthography, and transcribe it as Nin-PIRIG.
Ninshubur	Inanna, later also Anu	Ninshubur's role as the sukkal of Inanna is regarded as primary, while her association with Anu as a secondary development. The former is already attested in one of the Early Dynastic Zame Hymns. Additionally, either Ninshubur or Ilabrat appears as the sukkal of Pinikir in a single source from a Hurrian corpus written in Akkadian. In Girsu, Ninshubur was the spouse of Meslamtaea, a name used to refer to Nergal in early sources from southern Mesopotamian cities. Frans Wiggermann notes that the pairing of Nergal with Ninshubur is unusual, as she was the only goddess sometimes regarded as his wife who had a well defined role other than that of his spouse, the other exception being Ereshkigal. He assumes that since many of Nergal's occasional spouses, such as Mammitum or Admu, were possibly associated with the earth, this role of Ninshubur was tied to her function as "lady of the earth." No other examples of Ninshubur being regarded as another deity's wife are known. A single source refers to Ninshubur as Nergal's sukkal rather than wife. In Isin, Ninshubur was seemingly incorporated into the entourage of the medicine goddess Ninisina.
Nusku Nuska	Enlil	Nuska was either a son of Enlil, or instead of his ancestors Enul and Ninul. In Harran in the first millennium BCE he came to be viewed as a son of the moon god Sin instead. Through syncretism with Gibil, he could be regarded as a son or sukkal of Anu. He also had a wife, Sadarnunna. In myths he commonly appears as the sukkal and helper of Enlil, for example in Enlil and Sud he is responsible for preparing his marriage to the eponymous goddess. In addition to his role as a sukkal, he was also a god of fire and light.
Papsukkal	Zababa, Anu and Antu	The name Papsukkal is a combination of the words pap, "older brother," and sukkal. Papsukkal was originally the sukkal of Zababa, the tutelary god of Kish, but later acquired the role of the sukkal of Anu by assimilating Ninshubur. In Seleucid Uruk he was the sukkal of Anu and Antu. His symbol was a walking bird. A prayer refers to him as "offspring of Enmesharra," and they appear next to each other in a list of various vanquished mythical figures.
Qudma	Ištaran	It is uncertain if Quadma and Qadma are two spellings of the name of a single god or two closely related gods. Both names belong to divine judges. It is uncertain if the god Zīzānu was a son of Qudma or of Ištaran. While the god Nirah was frequently associated with Ištaran, he was his šipru ("messenger"), rather than sukkal.
Sililitum	Manzat	Sililitum is only known from a single copy of the god list An = Anum, similar to the rest of the circle of Manzat. Her name is likely Semitic in origin. She shared her name with the tenth month in the local calendar of Susa and according to Wilfred G. Lambert with a type of bird (šinūnūtu). The possibility that Sililitum was related to Silili, a deity known exclusively from a single passage in the Epic of Gilgamesh, has been deemed unlikely by Andrew R. George.
Šumaḫ	Ninisina	Šumaḫ was one of the three children of Ninisina and her husband Pabilsag, the other two being Gunura and Damu. His name means "the one with the mighty hand." In the god list An = Anum, he is one of the five udug (protective spirits) of Egalmah, his mother's temple. A ritual text states that his duty was cleaning and purifying the streets of Isin for his mother. A goddess with a similar name, Ama-šumaḫ, was the housekeeper (abarakkat) of Ekur according to the incantation series Muššu'u, and seemingly was associated both with Ninisina and with another medicine goddess, Nintinugga.
^{d}SUKKAL	Shamash	^{d}SUKKAL is known from documents from the archives of the First Dynasty of Sealand, and was possibly analogous to the male version of Ninshubur. Odette Boivin proposes that he functioned as a sukkal of Shamash during his daily journey through the sky, while Lugal-namtarra fulfilled the same role during the night in the underworld. None of Shamash's sukkals known from other sources are present in the Sealand texts.
Tašme-zikru	Išḫara	Tašme-zikru means "She answered my word" or "She answered the word". She is attested in the Isin and An = Anum god lists.
Ugur	Nergal	Ugur was originally the sukkal of Nergal, though he was replaced in this role by Ishum after the Old Babylonian period. In Mesopotamian sources his name was used to logographically represent the name of Nergal at least from the Middle Babylonian period onward. However, he continued to be worshiped as a war god by the Hurrians. In Hurrian sources he formed a triad with Nupatik and Aštabi. In Emar he was worshiped alongside Shuwala, a Hurrian goddess connected with the underworld.
Ungasaga and Hamun-ana	Nisaba	According to the god list An = Anum, Ungasaga and Hamun-ana were the two sukkals of Nisaba.
Urmašum, ^{d}UR and Uršbidga	Gula	According to the god list An = Anum, Urmašum, ^{d}UR (explained as analogous to Urmašum) and Uršabiduga were the three sukkals of Gula. In one case Urmašum was associated with the "Lamma star" (^{mul}lam-ma), usually the astral symbol of Bau's sukkal Lammašaga. It is possible he was envisioned as a canine being, as his name starts with ur, a sign present in the words urgi (dog), urmah (lion) and urbarra (wolf). The sign maš means "twin", which lead Manfred Krebernik to propose that he was derived from a pair of dog figures guarding a gate. In a single source, Urmašum's name contains a morpheme indicating the deity was seen as female, and in one further case it is unclear, though not impossible, that the name ends in the feminine -tum. A god with the same name appears among underworld deities in the Weidner god list, but his relationship with Gula's sukkal is unclear. Uršabiduga's name can be translated as "dog whose flesh is good (for an illness)".
Ushumgal	Ninkilim	The name Ushumgal could, depending on the determinative used, refer either to the sukkal of Ninkilim or to a mythical snake associated with the legendary sage Lu-Nanna. It is also attested as an epithet of Marduk, Dumuzi, Ninurta and Shamash.
Uznu and Ḫasīsu	Damgalnuna	According to the god list An = Anum, Uznu ("ear") and Ḫasīsu ("wisdom") were the sukkals of Damgalnuna, wife of Enki. They also occur together in a single incantation.
Zigarra	Meslamta-ea	Meslamt-ee in mention is one of the gods forming the pair Lugal-Irra and Meslamta-ea, associated with the cities Kisiga and Durum. Zigarra and Zimu, the sukkal of Lugal-irra, functioned as a pair, and in a single source they are equated with their masters.
Zimu Ziminigi	Lugalirra	Zimu and Ziggara, the sukkal of Meslamta-ea, functioned as a pair, and in a single source they are equated with their masters.

In addition to the sukkals listed above, according to the god list An = Anum the following deities had sukkals whose names are either not preserved or only partially preserved in known copies: Dingirmah, a goddess from Adab conflated with Ninhursag, Gishhuranki, the wife of Ashgi, Šulpae, Panigingarra, and Ninsun. An offering list from Umma from the Ur III period mentions a nameless sukkal of the artisan goddess Ninmug. Frans Wiggermann argues that based on iconographic evidence it can be assumed that sukkals associated with Nanshe and Ningirsu also existed, though their names are unknown.

== List of sukkals from outside Mesopotamia ==
The concept of sukkal was also incorporated into Hurrian religion. The Hurrian spelling of this word was šukkalli. All of the major Hurrian gods were believed to have their own sukkals.

Name	Corresponding major deity	Culture	Details
Ḫupuštukar	Ḫešui	Hurrian	Ḫupuštukar was the sukkal of Ḫešui, a Hurrian war god. His name is derived from the Hurrian verb ḫub-, "to break." In one ritual text, he appears alongside the sukkals of other deities: Immanzizi, Undurumma, Tenu, Lipparuma and Mukišanu.
Impaluri	The sea (Kiaše)	Hurrian	Impaluri was the sukkal of the Hurrian sea god. Volkert Haas notes that the suffix -luri appears not only in his name, but also in these of other Hurrian deities, such as the mountain goddess Lelluri and the primordial giant Upelluri, as well some mountain and stone names.
Izzummi	Ea	Hurrian	Izzummi is the Hurrian name of Isimud or Ushmu, the sukkal of Ea, who was incorporated into the Hurrian pantheon alongside his master.
Lipparuma	Šimige	Hurrian	Lipparuma or Lipparu was the sukkal of the Hurrian sun god, Šimige. In a bilingual Sumero-Hurrian version of the Weidner god list from Emar Šimige's sukkal is instead the Mesopotamian Bunene (transcribed in Hurrian as ^{d}Wu-u-un-ni-nu-wa-an). Lipparuma and Bunene could be treated as equivalents.
Mukišānu	Kumarbi	Hurrian	Mukišānu was the sukkal of Kumarbi. His name was derived from Mukiš, a geographic name designating the area around the city of Alalakh, where a large percentage of the population spoke Hurrian.
Takitu	Hebat	Hurrian/Syrian	Takitu (dqt in the Ugaritic alphabetic script; multiple spellings alternating between ta and tu and da and du are attested from Hurro-Hittite sources) was the sukkal of Hebat. In the Yazılıkaya sanctuary she appears right behind her. It has been proposed that her name might be derived from the Semitic root dqq, "small." In a myth preserved on the tablet CTH 346.12 she is described as traveling through the lands of Mitanni to distant Šimurrum on behalf of her mistress. She also appears in the Song of Ullikummi, where Hebat tasks her with finding out the fate of her husband after his initial confrontation with the eponymous monster.
Tapšuwari	possibly Kušuḫ	Hurrian	According to Meindert Dijkstra Tapšuwari was the sukkal of the Hurrian moon god, Kušuḫ, but Volkert Haas instead identifies him as a member of the circle of Kumarbi. He appears in a fragment of the Hurrian version of Song of Ullikummi, and in a further literary fragment also involving the sun and moon gods.
Tašmišu	Teshub	Hurrian	Tašmišu was the sukkal and brother of Teshub, the Hurrian weather god. His wife was the goddess Nabarbi. The etymology of his name is uncertain, though it has been proposed that tašmi meant "strong" in Hurrian. While he was associated with the Hittite god Šuwaliyat, he never acquired the latter's association with vegetation.
Tenu	Teshub	Hurrian or Syrian	Tenu was a god who appears as the sukkal of Teshub in ritual texts in place of Tašmišu. Daniel Schwemer proposes that this situation might indicate he belonged to the pantheon of Aleppo (Halab). Gary Beckman also attributes Syrian origin to him. However, Alfonso Archi assumes that he had Hurrian origin.
Tiyabenti	Hebat	Hurrian	Tiyabenti was a deity of unclear gender from the circle of Hebat, regarded as her sukkal. The name means "he who speaks favorably" or "she who speaks favorably." In myths, the role of Hebat's sukkal instead belongs to Takitu, whose name might have Semitic, rather than Hurrian, origin. However, the two of them coexist in ritual texts, where both can accompany Hebat, which means that theories according to which one of them was merely an epithet of the other are unsubstantiated.
Undurumma	Šauška	Hurrian	Undurumma was, according to the single source attesting the existence of this deity, the sukkal of Šauška. It is uncertain if Unudurupa/Unduruwa, associated with the underworld goddess Allani in another document, was the same deity. In most rituals and in myths, Šauška was instead accompanied by the musician goddesses Ninatta and Kulitta.

== See also ==
- Angels in Judaism
- Uthra (in Mandaeism)
