= Martu =

Martu may refer to:

- Martu people, Australian Aboriginal people
- Amorites, ancient Middle Eastern people, known as MAR.TU in the Sumerian language
- Amurru (god), the deity worshiped by the Amorite, also known as Martu
