= Enkimdu =

Mesopotamian god

- God of agriculture and irrigation
- Major cult center: possibly Umma

Enkimdu (𒀭𒂗𒆠𒅎𒁺) was a Mesopotamian god associated with agriculture and irrigation. He is best known from the poem Dumuzi and Enkimdu, but in laments he was instead connected with the god Martu, who like Dumuzi could be described and depicted as a shepherd.

== Character ==
Enkimdu was an agricultural god. He was called the "lord of embankments and ditches". The theonym Lugal-epara, "lord of ditch and dyke", attested in the god list An = Anum without an explanation provided, might be another name of Enkimdu due to analogous meaning to said epithet. An Akkadian form of the title is also attested, bēl iki u palgi. In the same god list, Enkimdu appears as one of the "cultivators" (ab-ším) of Nabu. However, in the Old Babylonian forerunner of this text he is instead placed among deities representing various professions in a section focused on Enki and his entourage. His character has been compared to Enbilulu's. It has been proposed that he was worshiped in Umma as the personification of the irrigation system, though the evidence is scarce.

In laments, Enkimdu could be associated with Amurru. One bilingual text of this genre which enumerates exactly a hundred deities places him near the end of the list alongside the likes of Šumugan, Mesanga-Unug, Martu (Amurru), Gubarra (Ašratum) and Latarak. Another, dated to the [Old Babylonian period, lists Enkimdu, Martu, Šumugan, Numušda and Ištaran.

== Mythology ==
=== Enkimdu and Dumuzi ===
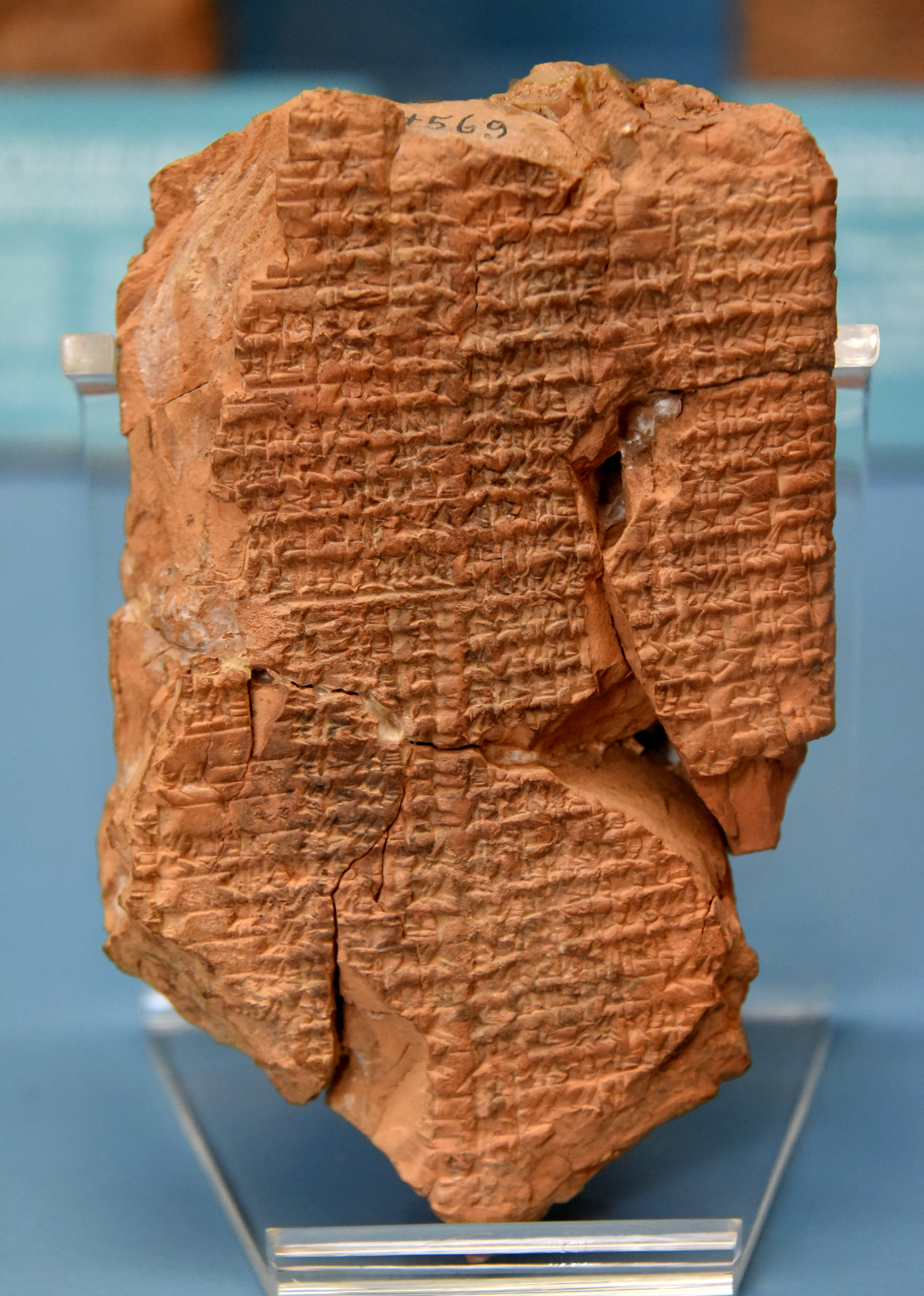
A copy of the tale of Dumuzi and Enkimdu from Nippur (Nuffar), Iraq. First half of the second millennium BCE. Ancient Orient Museum, Istanbul.

Enkimdu appears in the myth Enkimdu and Dumuzi. The text has originally been published under the title Inanna prefers the farmer by Samuel Noah Kramer in 1944. Initially it was assumed that it would end with Inanna choosing Enkimdu, but this interpretation was abandoned after more editions were compiled. In the beginning Inanna's brother Utu urges her to choose Dumuzi, but she is not convinced. Enkimdu mentions many gifts he can give her connected with his sphere of influence, but Dumuzi counters each offer with one of his own. Eventually their argument ends, and they become friends. Enkimdu's role has been described as largely passive. It has been pointed out that the conclusion of this narrative, a brief praise of Inanna, bears a similarity to the genre of disputation poems common in Sumerian literature, in which the deity tasked with choosing the winner is similarly praised in the closing lines of each text. However, incipits of known copies indicate it was regarded as balbale, a type of song.

It has been pointed out that Dumuzi does not appear in any of the texts where Enkimdu occurs alongside Martu, which might indicate that in this case the latter was meant to serve as a shepherd god contrasted with Enkimdu in a similar way. Jacob Klein also notes that similarities exist between Dumuzi's successful appeal to Inanna and Martu's victory in the myth Marriage of Martu, in which he wants to win the hand of the daughter of Numušda.

=== Other texts ===
In the myth Enki and the World Order, Enkimdu is entrusted with preparing various agricultural constructions. He is also addressed as the "farmer of Enlil."

A hymn dedicated to the king Ur-Nammu compares him to Enkimdu. In Death of Ur-Nammu, the god stops fulfilling his tasks after learning of the eponymous king's death.

The text The Song of the Plowing Oxen includes a dialogue between Enkimdu and a second party, according to Miguel Civil possibly Ninurta or a king, in which the former explains to the latter how he irrigates the fields.

== Modern relevance ==
A simulation engine developed as part of Oriental Institute of the University of Chicago's MASS (Modeling Ancient Settlement Systems) project is named ENKIMDU. It was based on technologies developed by Argonne National Laboratory. It is meant to provide models of development of societies in the Ancient Near East between the late fourth and third millennium BCE, with a particular focus on staple crop production. The project's case study was Tell Beydar in Syria.
