= Šarrāḫītu =

Šarrāḫītu (Akkadian: "The glorified one") was a Mesopotamian goddess worshiped chiefly in Uruk from the Achaemenid period onward.

Oldest attestations of Šarrāḫītu come from Babylon, where she was identified with Ašratum, the wife of Amurru. She is mentioned among the deities worshiped in Esagil during Esarhaddon's reign. A late esoteric text explains her name as Ašrat aḫītu, "Ashratum, the foreigner." Ašratum's name was a cognate of that of the Ugaritic goddess Athirat, but they developed separately from each other.

Šarrāḫītu was among the goddesses who were introduced to the pantheon of Uruk in the final centuries of history of ancient Mesopotamia, alongside the likes of Amasagnudi and Ama-arhus. She was associated with Belet-Seri. However, not much is presently known about her significance and the circumstances of her introduction. It has been pointed out that her rise to prominence in Uruk occurred at the same time as relative decline of Uṣur-amāssu and Urkayītu.

She is not attested in any known personal names.
