= Antu (goddess) =

Mesopotamian goddess

- Sky goddess, feminine counterpart of Anu
- Venerated in: Ancient Mesopotamian religion, Hurrian religion
- Major cult center: Uruk
- Temple: Bīt Rēš

Genealogy
- Spouse: Anu
- Children: Lamashtu

Antu (𒀭𒌈) or Antum is a Mesopotamian goddess regarded as the feminine counterpart and spouse of the sky god, Anu. She was sometimes identified with the earth rather than the sky, though such references are not common. While already attested in the third millennium BCE, she was only a minor goddess, and only came to be worshiped commonly in Uruk in the Achaemenid and Seleucid periods, due to religious reforms which elevated her and Anu to the position of tutelary deities of the city. At some point Antu was also incorporated into Hurrian religion, in which she was understood as a primeval deity. In the so-called "Standard Babylonian" edition of the Epic of Gilgamesh Antu is addressed as the mother of Ishtar, but this tradition was not commonly adhered to.

== Name and character ==
Antu's name is etymologically an Akkadian feminine derivative of the theonym Anu. The cuneiform sign representing the latter name, AN, in addition to designating the sky god could also function as an ordinary noun, read as either /an/, "heaven", or /dingir/, "deity". Antu accordingly functioned as the feminine counterpart of Anu. She was also regarded as his spouse. Cases of Anu and Antu being equated with each other are attested too. Paul-Alain Beaulieu interprets this as an indication the cuneiform sign AN could be used as a logogram (sumerogram) to represent the name of Antu. However, as noted by Manfred Krebernik it is also possible that the sky was at some point envisioned as an androgynous being in Mesopotamian tradition.

A small number of sources, including the god list An = Anum, treat Antu as deified earth (ki/erṣetum). An Old Babylonian lexical list, Diri, equates her with Urash, an earth goddess also associated with Anu. It has also been suggested that the phrase AN URAŠ occurring on seals from the Kassite period, agreed to represent a compound of two theonyms, might also have been understood as "Anu-Antu". Antu might have also played the role of earth in formulaic references to Anu, representing the sky, inseminating the ground with his rains. Thorkild Jacobsen in the 1970s asserted that as an extension of this belief rain was believed to come out of Antu’s breasts, which according to his assumption were envisioned as clouds. This conclusion is also supported by Karen Rhea Nemet-Nejat.

In the Seleucid period, Antu’s name and her epithets became a subject of both theological and philological speculation. A text focused on this topic is preserved on the tablet MLC 1890 (presently in the Morgan Library Collection, part of the Yale Babylonian Collection), dated to the reign of Seleucus III Ceraunus (most likely 225 BCE) and according to its colophon copied by a scribe named Illut-Anu. As already attested in earlier god lists, she could be equated with various primordial deities, same as Anu. For example, an equation between Antu and Anu and, respectively, Kishar and Anshar is preserved in An = Anum. The link between her and Kishar recurs in a later composition from Uruk. An Assyrian expository text (KAR 307), presumably dependent on Babylonian Enūma Eliš, in a paragraph discussing Tiamat states that she can be understood as "Antum who makes offerings for the dead to Anu" alongside other esoteric speculations about her identity. Wilfred G. Lambert suggested that this identification might be derived from the frequent references to Anu being a father of various demons, which would by extension make Antu their mother and thus a suitable figure to identify with Tiamat. Examples of demons directly identified as children of Anu include Asakku (in Lugal-e), Utukku (in Udug-Hul) and Sebitti (in the Epic of Erra). Additionally, Lamashtu was explicitly identified as a daughter of both Antu and Anu.

Antu's association with the underworld attested in KAR 307 is also mentioned in a number of texts compiled by Seleucid kalû clergy, but it remains unknown if this belief was shared by other social groups. In a single case, "great Antu" is attested as a title of Ereshkigal in a funerary ritual prescribing the offering of beer and wine to her, Gilgamesh and a group of figures described as sailors, presumably the crew of a ferry carrying the dead.

Sources from the Seleucid period indicate that in Mesopotamian astronomy Antu and Anu were identified with a pair of circumpolar stars referred to as "Great Anu and Antu of Heaven". However, attestations of the latter astral body are limited to texts from Uruk, and no sources from earlier periods or other cities ever linked any stars to Antu. According to Erica Reiner, it can be assumed that the "Great Antu" was one of the stars of the constellation Ursa Major.

== Worship ==
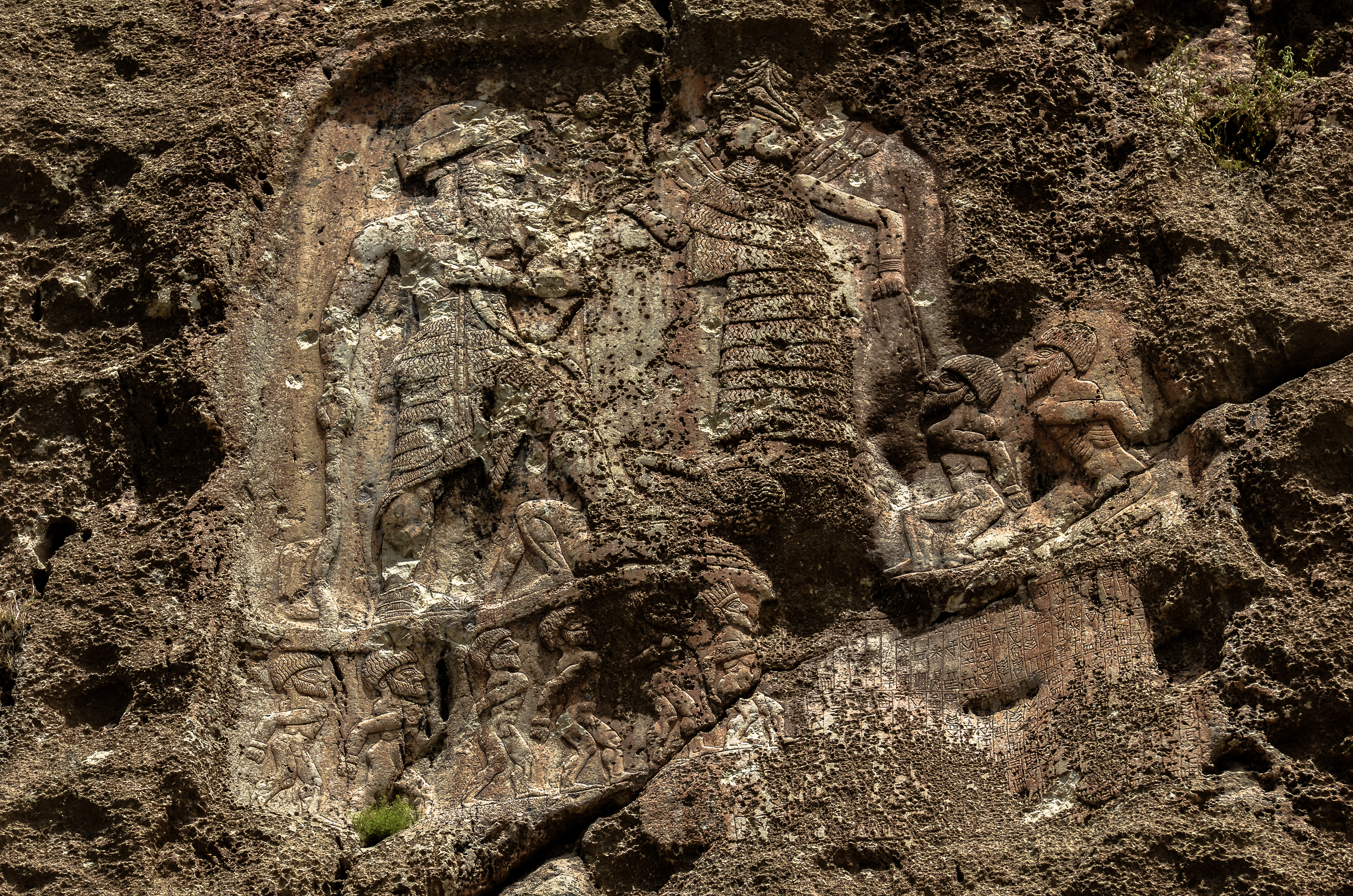
The Anubanini rock relief. Inscription mentioning Antu is visible in the bottom right corner.

Antu is already attested in the third millennium BCE, with the oldest possible reference tentatively identified in an Early Dynastic god list from Abu Salabikh. However, prior to the fifth century BCE she was not a commonly worshiped deity, and her position in the Mesopotamian pantheon has been described as “unimportant and elusive” by Paul-Alain Beaulieu. She is attested next to Anu among the deities mentioned in the inscription of Anubanini on the so-called Anubanini rock relief. This king's reign has been dated to the early Isin-Larsa period, and his kingdom, Lullubum, was centered in the area in the proximity of modern Sulaymaniyah. References to Antu also occur in letters from the Old Babylonian period, but they are not common. She also appears alongside Anu in the Agum-Kakrime inscription. In incantations, she is attested in formulas against illness and demons, for example Lamashtu. In Maqlû, she is invoked against witches alongside Anu and Belet-Seri.

In later periods, Antu was worshiped in Uruk. However, no references to her are present in any texts from this city predating the first millennium BCE, and in the Neo-Babylonian period she is only mentioned in a single letter. It mentions that a garment (kusītu) was borrowed for an occasion connected to her from the Eanna temple. Additionally, it describes offerings to her, Bēl-āliya and Mār-bīti. Paul-Alaian Beaulieu points out that the letter was sent from a temple partially subordinate to Eanna, which alongside the fact that its sender bore the name invoking Larsa's tutelary god Shamash, Šamaš-aḫ-iddin, lead him to suggest it might deal with worship of Antu in this city rather than Uruk. A second possibility is that Kullab is meant, as while it is not known if Larsa had its own Bēl-āliya, a “divine mayor”, this title is well attested for Pisangunug in the case of the other settlement.

A change in Antu's status in Uruk occurred over the course of the Achaemenid and Seleucid periods, when she was elevated to the position of one of the lead deities of the city alongside Anu. She came to be worshiped alongside him in a newly built temple, Bīt Rēš. Its ceremonial name can be translated as "foremost temple". Antu's cella in it was known as Egašananna, "house of the lady of heaven". One of its chambers was also designated as her bedroom, and was referred to with the ceremonial name Enir, possibly to be understood as Eanir (Akkadian bīt tānēḫi), "house of weariness". According to Andrew R. George and Paul-Alain Beaulieu, Bīt Rēš might have developed from the É.SAG, a sanctuary of Lugalbanda attested in earlier periods whose name was written with the same signs, but this remains hypothetical. Its establishment marked the first time in the history of Uruk when Eanna was not its main temple. This development was a result of the rise of new priestly families in the aftermath of failed revolts which took place in 484 BCE and Xerxes I's retaliation against the participants. The status of the city's former tutelary deity, Ishtar, declined, and some of her attributes were absorbed by Antu. For example, in the text MLC 1890 Ninsianna, the personification of the planet Venus, who in earlier periods could be treated as a form of Ishtar, is instead treated as an epithet of Antu. The kalû clergy of Uruk, responsible for Emesal prayers and formerly associated with Ishtar, came to be linked to the cult of Anu and Antu instead in Seleucid times. In some cases, the change makes it possible to date individual texts with no other direct indication of their age than their authors being a kalû in service of one of these deities. It is not certain if Seleucid kings were involved in the worship of Antu and other deities of Uruk, though it has been argued that the attested building and renovation projects required royal support.

In texts from Seleucid Uruk, Antu almost always appears alongside Anu. As argued by Joan Goodnick Westenholz, the local theologians effectively treated the pair as "one single divine manifestation". She argues that the process of their elevation can therefore be seen as part of a broader phenomenon focused on predominance of city gods (rather than city goddesses) in the late period of Mesopotamian antiquity, which was linked to henotheist tendencies. However, according to Julia Krul speculative henotheist theology, while well attested, never enjoyed much popularity outside of small intellectual circles. It is also known that Antu was celebrated with a procession during the new year festival, during which she was accompanied by a number of deities normally not associated with her and seemingly grouped only for the sake of newly established celebrations: Bēlet-ilī, Shala, Mārāt-Ani ("Daughters of Anu"), Aya, Gula, Ninešgal ("Mistress of the Ešgal temple", a manifestation of Ishtar), Amasagnudi, Sadarnunna, Ašratu and Šarrat-šamê ("Queen of the Heavens", possibly another manifestation of Ishtar). The formula "may it be preserved by the command of Anu and Antu" is attested in scholarly compositions, as well as legal and administrative documents, especially marriage agreements. In addition to direct references to Antu in ritual and economic texts, she is also attested in theophoric names.

=== Hurrian reception ===
Antu was at some point incorporated into Hurrian religion, and in this context came to be regarded as one of the primeval deities alongside other figures originating in Mesopotamia, such as Anu, Enlil, Ninlil or Alalu. Most likely this classification reflected their perception in areas located on the periphery of the Mesopotamian cultural sphere. In Hurrian context Antu formed a triad alongside Anu and Apantu. The latter deity's name according to Alfonso Archi was formed in assonance with her own.

In a trilingual edition of the Weidner god list from Ugarit, Antu corresponds to the entries Ašte Anive (in the Hurrian column) and Tahāmatu (in the Ugaritic column). The first of these names does not represent an actual deity, and instead is a neologism invented by the text's compilers, who provided Anu, under a Hurrian variant of his name, with a wife whose Hurrian name would be similarly derived from his own, literally "the wife of Ani". The second can be translated as "the deep waters" and presumably represented the freshwater springs in the proximity of Ugarit. Due to multiple entries considered to be either similar scholarly inventions or scribal word plays, the list is not considered to be an accurate source of information about either Hurrian or Ugaritic religion.

== Mythology ==
Antu is mentioned in the so-called "Standard Babylonian" edition of the Epic of Gilgamesh when Ishtar demands Anu to give her the permission to use the Bull of Heaven to punish Gilgamesh (tablet VI, line 83). While she and Anu are addressed as Ishtar's parents in this passage, as pointed out by Paul-Alain Beaulieu the tradition according to which she was a daughter of Nanna and Ningal was more widespread. Walter Burkert has suggested that the passage might have influenced the reference to Aphrodite's mother Dione in the Iliad, with the name Dione being a calque of Antu, as it is a feminine form of Zeus. However, as stressed by Andrew R. George in his discussion of the work of Burkert and other authors who assume Homer was directly influenced by the Epic of Gilgamesh, it cannot be established with certainty that any possible similarities arose from direct contact with the Mesopotamian composition. He notes it might be more plausible to assume similar motifs reflect a shared tradition rather than necessarily direct derivation.

According to incantations against Lamashtu, Antu and Anu cast this demon down from heaven and denied her the right to have a sanctuary (parakku) on earth.

While Antu is not attested in Enūma Eliš, and Anu is addressed as the sole parent of Ea in this composition, according to Spencer L. Allen based on supplementary evidence from an esoteric Assyrian commentary it is nonetheless possible that she was implicitly understood as his mother and thus as the grandmother of Marduk in derived tradition.

In a Seleucid astronomical text, Papsukkal is described as the vizier of both Anu and Antu.
