= Amurru =

Amurru may refer to:

- Amurru kingdom, roughly current day western Syria and northern Lebanon
- Amorites, ancient Syrian people
- Amurru (god), the Amorite deity
