= Sadarnunna =

Mesopotamian goddess

- Major cult center: Nippur, Harran

Genealogy
- Parents: Anu (father)
- Spouse: Nuska

Sadarnunna was a Mesopotamian goddess regarded as the wife of Nuska. Very little is known about her individual character. She was worshiped in Nippur, and appears alongside other deities of this city in texts from the Ur III period already. In later times she is also attested in sources from other locations, for example Harran and Uruk.

== Character ==
The meaning of Sadarnunna's name remains uncertain. In the earliest texts she appears in, it is consistently written in cuneiform as ^{d}Sa-dir(i)-nun-na, but in the Old Babylonian period ^{d}Sa-dàr(a)-nun-na (𒀭𒊓𒁰𒉣𒈾) became the default spelling. According to the Old Babylonian forerunner to the later god list An = Anum and to an emesal vocabulary, she could also be called Ninka'ašbaranki, "mistress who makes decisions for heaven and earth." Further attested alternate names include Ninkiaĝnuna, "mistress loved by the prince," Ninmešudu, "mistress who perfects the me," and Dumu-abzu, "child of the Abzu."

Very little is known about Sadarnunna's individual character. A late explanatory text describes her as the "advisor of god and king." A hymn dedicated to her refers to her multiple times as the "virtuous woman" (munus-zi).

== Associations with other deities ==
Sadarnunna was regarded as the spouse of Nuska. She is already paired with him in the earliest available sources mentioning her. They appear together in various god lists, including the Weidner god list, the Mari god list and an Old Babylonian forerunner of An = Anum. However, in the Nippur god list she instead appears alongside Ninkarnunna, and in the poorly preserved Isin god list after Gatumdug and before Gazbaba. According to Old Babylonian sources, a room in a temple of Nuska in Nippur was regarded as a bedchamber which belonged both to him and to Sadarnunna.

Anu was regarded as Sadarnunna's father. This tradition is attested in a hymn dedicated to her, and in sources from Uruk.

Hanspeter Schaudig suggests that in Assyria Sadarnunna might have been conflated with the goddess Kippat-māti, as in a Neo-Assyrian hymn both of them are paired with Nuska in parallel. Furthermore, in the same text Kippat-māti is seemingly assigned Sadarnunna's status as a daughter of Anu.

Under the dialectical emesal form of the name Ninmešudu, Gašanmešudu, Sadarnunna appears alongside Umunmuduru (Ninĝidru) in lamentations. In the incantation series Šurpu (tablet VIII, lines 31-33) she appears between Šulpae and Belet-ili in a sequence of deities implored to release a patient from a curse.

The god list An = Anum states that the deity Ad-ḪI-nun (reading of the second sign remains uncertain) served as Sadarnunna's counselor.

== Worship ==
Sadarnunna is first attested in offering lists from the Ur III period from Puzrish-Dagan which deal with the deities worshiped in Nippur. For example, one mentions her alongside Nuska between the pairs Ninurta and Ninnibru and Lugalgusisu and Memešaga.

Nippur was the cult center of Sadarnunna. The Epaddanunus, "chosen house of the women" or chosen house of the woman," is listed as her temple in the Canonical Temple List and possibly elsewhere, and it is presumed that it was located there. Since it is absent from an administrative document listing the city's temples which received provisions in the Kassite period, it has been proposed that it was a part of a sanctuary of Nuska in the Ekur complex, rather than a fully independent house of worship. Both Sadarnunna and Nuska were also worshiped in the Ešmaḫ, a shrine in the Ekur whose name means "exalted house." It is also possible that the Eš u-Enlille, "house (created) by the hand of Enlil," was dedicated to one or both of them.

Sadarnunna appears alongside Nuska in an inscription on a kudurru (boundary stone) from the Kassite period which according to Wilfred G. Lambert represents "the religious outlook of Der."

Documents from the reign of Nabonidus indicate Sadarnunna was worshiped in Harran. An inscription of this king states that he restored the local temple Eḫulḫul, the "house which gives joy," for "the gods Sin, Ningal, Nusku and Sadarnunna," who he refers to as his "lords." An inscription of his mother Adad-guppi states that he led the same deities there from Babylon in procession, and that he "performed (...) all the forgotten rites" dedicated to them. Adad-Guppi also considered herself to be a devotee of these four deities.

In the Seleucid period, Sadarnunna also came to be worshiped in Uruk, though she is absent from earlier Neo-Babylonian texts from this city. According to Julia Krul, she was introduced to the local pantheon because of her connection to Nuska. She might have been worshiped alongside him in a cella in the Bīt Rēš, "head temple," a newly built complex dedicated to Anu and Antu. During the akitu festival, she was one of the deities parading alongside the latter of these two deities, alongside the likes of Shala, Aya, Gula, Amasagnudi and Ašratum. She also appears in an inscription of a certain Anu-uballiṭ, which contains an oracular inquiry pertaining to the creation of a new statue of Ishtar, which he directed at her, Shamash, Adad and Zababa.

Lexical texts attest that the worship of Sadarnunna involved cultic boats.
