= Belet-Seri =

Mesopotamian goddess

Belet-Seri was a Mesopotamian goddess who served as a scribe in the court of the underworld goddess Ereshkigal. She could be regarded as the Akkadian counterpart of Sumerian Geshtinanna, but the name could also function as a title of Ašratum, the wife of Amurru, or as a fully independent deity.

== Character ==
The name Belet-Seri means "mistress of the steppe." The Akkadian word ṣēru, in addition to its literal meaning, could also refer to the underworld. Old Babylonian incantations, such as Udug-hul, attest that Belet-Seri was envisioned as a scribe of the underworld (ṭupšarrat arallê). It has been proposed that she was meant to server as a mirror of the royal scribe (ṭupšar ekalli) in the underworld court of Ereshkigal. She was most likely believed to hold a list containing the names of the dead, on the basis of which they were admitted to the underworld. Her role is described in the Epic of Gilgamesh when Enkidu has a vision of the underworld in a dream. In the incantation series Maqlû, Šurpu, and Bīt Mēseri she is asked to bind demons and witches and prevent them from leaving the underworld.

At an undetermined point in the second millennium BCE, Belet-Seri developed an association with the goddess Gula and by extension with medicine.

Julia Krul proposes that in Hellenistic Uruk Belet-Seri came to be seen as the vizier (sukkal) of Ereshkigal and perhaps Anu, as she received offerings alongside Papsukkal, well attested in such a role. She also proposes that she could be associated with Ningishzida, whose cult was still present in this city in late sources.

== Identification with other goddesses ==
Belet-Seri commonly functioned as an Akkadian name of Geshtinanna, though it could also be applied to Ašratum, the wife of Amurru, and to her Sumerian counterpart Gubarra. It has however been proposed that in the later case the term can be understood as a reference to an ordinary steppe, rather than a euphemism for the land of the dead. Belet-Seri could also function as an independent deity, for example in the neo-Assyrian pantheon. Furthermore, Ningishzida's wife Azimua, syncretised with Geshtinanna, could be described as a scribe of the underworld too.

== Worship ==
Belet-seri was worshiped in Nippur and in Assur in temples of Gula. She was also associated with Dunnu-sa'idi, a town located between Babylon and Sippar. In Assur, she was worshiped in the temple of Gula.

In oath formulas accompanying some neo-Assyrian contracts, Belet-Seri appears with a deity named Adad-milki, who seemingly served as her consort.

She was among the most celebrated deities in late sources from Uruk. After the year 484 BCE, the pantheon of this city was restructured due to collapse of the Eanna temple in the aftermath of the failed Babylonian rebellion against the rule of Persian king Xerxes. Her cult was only introduced there in this period. Joan Goodnick Westenholz proposed that she and Šarrāḫītu, also not attested in earlier sources from Uruk, replaced Urkayītu and Uṣur-amāssu in the local pantheon. Belet-Seri had her own temple, which was apparently surrounded by an orchard. According to documents from the Seleucid period, it bore the name é.gal edin, "palace of the steppe."

A text dealing with the types of meat various gods should receive states that fowl was viewed as unsuitable offering for Belet-Seri.

Theophoric names invoking Belet-Seri are known from documents from Hellenistic Uruk. Most individuals bearing them were people of low social standing, including slaves, former slaves and free menial workers.
