= Amasagnudi =

Mesopotamian goddess

- Courtier of Anu
- Major cult center: Uruk

Genealogy
- Spouse: Papsukkal

Amasagnudi was a Mesopotamian goddess regarded as a servant of Anu and as the wife of Papsukkal. She is only known from a handful of sources, including the god list An = Anum and documents from Seleucid Uruk.

== Name ==
The name Amasagnudi can be translated as "the indestructible mother," "the unmovable mother," "the mother who does not go away," or "the mother who cannot be pushed aside." The resurgence of deities with names starting with the sign ama, "mother," in the theology of Seleucid Uruk, including both her and Ama-arḫuš, is considered to be unusual.

Readings of the name proposed in the past, now regarded as erroneous, include Amasagsilsirsir and Amapanul. Both were based on the forms ^{d}AMA.SAG.QA.NU.NU and ^{d}AMA.PA.NU.UL from Seleucid documents from Uruk. It has been argued that the spelling varied due to Amasagnudi's obscurity prior to her rise of prominence in this period making her name difficult to render even for the literati of the city. Most likely its original meaning was no longer understood due to trouble with structure and grammar of Sumerian common in late texts.

Amasagnudi was also known by the name Ninkagal, "lady of the great gate," also read Nin-abula or Nin-abul.

== Character ==
The oldest reference to Amasagnudi, a lexical text which lists her as an equivalent of Ninshubur, explains that she was a female deity (nin-sukkal, "vizieress") and the sukkal (divine vizier) of Anu.

Three possibilities have been proposed for the origin of Amasagnudi: that she was the original sukkal of Anu, replaced in this role by Inanna's sukkal Ninshubur; that she was an epithet of Ninshubur; or that she was the wife of the male form of Ninshubur.

In the god list An = Anum and in sources from Seleucid Uruk, she appears as the wife of Papsukkal.

== Worship ==
References to Amasagnudi from before the Seleucid period are incredibly rare, and according to Paul-Alain Beaulieu as of 1992 known examples were limited to the god list An = Anum and a single lexical text. More recent research revealed a further occurrence of Amasagnudi in the second millennium BCE in an Akkadian incantation against Lamashtu known from a copy from Ugarit, in which she appears alongside Papsukkal. Furthermore, her alternate name, Nin-abul, is present in an Old Babylonian exercise text.

Amasagnudi was introduced to Uruk alongside Papsukkal. The entire pantheon of the city was restructured in the Seleucid period, with Ishtar, Nanaya and their court, encompassing deities such as Uṣur-amāssu, surpassed in prominence by Anu and Antu. While Anu was not completely absent from Uruk at any point in time between the third and first millennium BCE, his position was that of a "figurehead" and "otiose deity" according to Paul-Alain Beaulieu. He proposes that Anu's rise was the result of Babylon losing its influence after Persian conquest, which resulted in the development of a new local theology relying on the god list An = Anum (which starts the divine hierarchy with Anu) to enhance local pride. A side effect of the process was the rise of deities connected with Anu, such as Papsukkal and Amasagnudi.

In theological texts, Papsukkal and Amasagnudi are jointly listed on the ninth place in lists arranging the gods of Seleucid Uruk according to perceived theological importance. However, Amasagnudi does not occur in any theophoric names from Uruk. Julia Krul proposes that it should be understood as an indication that her presence in the religion of Seleucid Uruk was largely limited to theological speculation of high-ranking members of the clergy.

During the new year festival held in Uruk in the Seleucid period, Amasagnudi was among the deities listed as participants of the parade led by Antu (rather than Ishtar), alongside the likes of Shala, Aya, Gula, Sadarnunna (the wife of Nuska) and Ašratum.
