= Azimua =

Azimua, also known as Ninazimua, was a Mesopotamian goddess regarded as the wife of Ningishzida.

== Name ==
Ninazimua is the original spelling of the name of this goddess, attested in sources from the Ur III period. Later the NIN sign was usually omitted. The form Ninazimua is attested in at least one theophoric name, Geme-Ninazimua.

Wilfred G. Lambert proposed that the element a-zi in her name can be interpreted as "water of life."

== Position in the pantheon ==
Azimua was regarded as the wife of Ningishzida. However, multiple traditions regarding this god's marital status existed. The god list An = Anum identifies not only Azimua, but also Ekurritum (not attested in such a role anywhere else) as his wives, while other sources favor Geshtinanna, identified with Belet-Seri. In some cases, Azimua and Geshtinanna/Belet-Seri were conflated, for example in inscriptions of king Gudea of Lagash. A god list from Susa treats them as two names of the same deity, identified both as the wife of Ningishzida and sister of Dumuzi. According to Wilfred G. Lambert, Azimua's name could simply function as a title of Geshtinanna in contexts where the latter was identified as Ningishzida's wife.

Belet-Seri could also function as an epithet of Ashratum, the wife of Amurru, or of her Sumerian counterpart Gubarra, in at least one case leading to conflation of Amurru and Ningishzida and to an association between the former and Azimua.

Azimua could serve as the scribe of the underworld, a role also assigned to Geshtinanna.

== Worship ==
It is likely that Azimua appears for the first time in a text from Early Dynastic Tell Fara, though the full name of the deity in mention is not preserved. A further early uncertain attestation comes from a Zame Hymn from Abu Salabikh, though Dina Katz notes that in absence of Ningishzida from this text corpus the restoration the presence of Azimua would be unusual.

She was worshiped in Ur, where a temple dedicated to her existed, and in Umma.

== Mythology ==
Ninazimua appears in the myth Ningishzida and Ninazumua, which describes an exchange of messages between her and her temporarily deceased husband. It is regarded as similar to other myths dealing with temporary death of deities: Damu and his sister, Dumuzi and his sisters, Dumuzi and Geshtinanna, Dumuzi's dream and Inanna's descent. However, due to small number of known copies, possible scribal mistakes and other issues it is presently impossible to fully reconstruct its plot.
