= Ašratum =

Mesopotamian goddess of Amorite origin

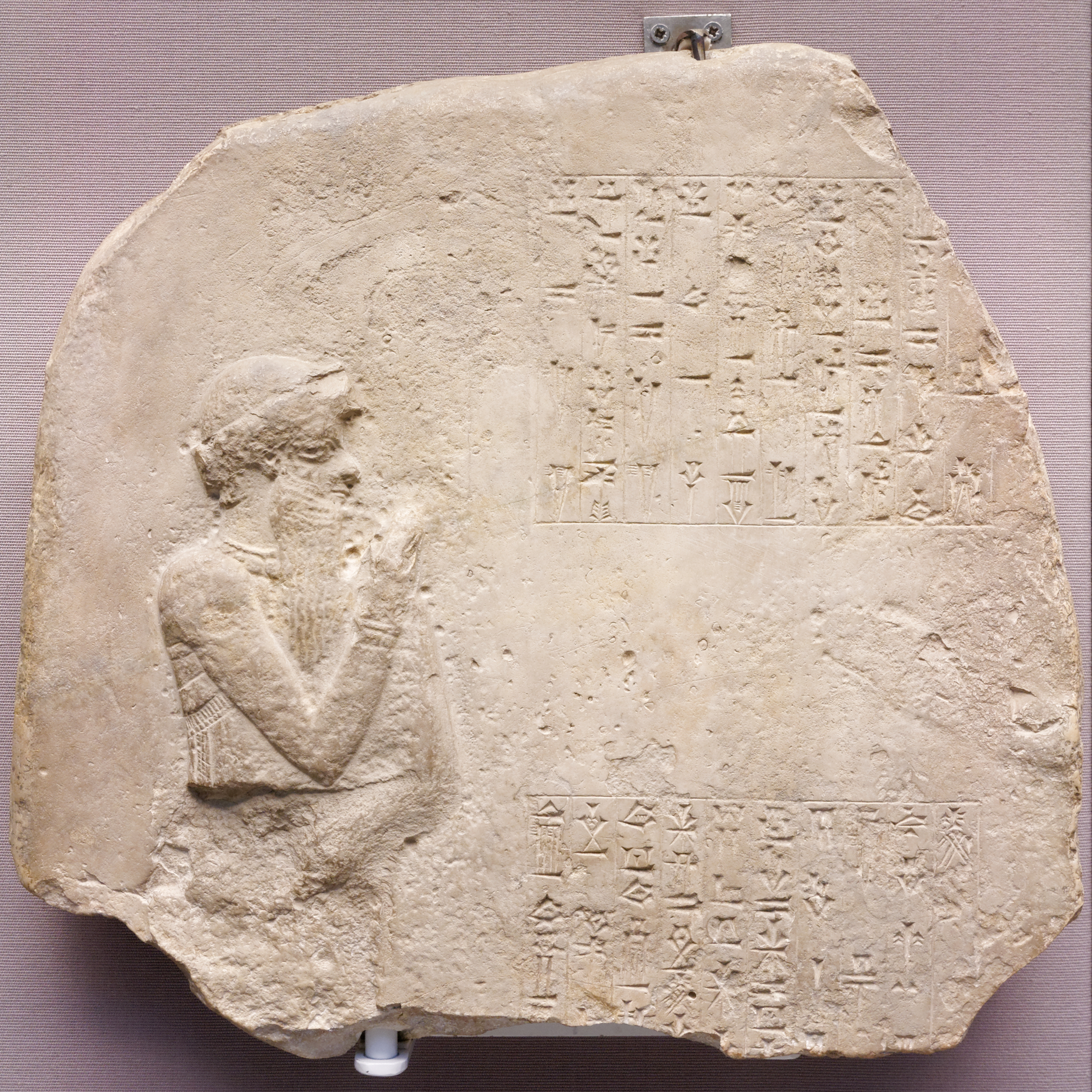
- A votive inscription of Itur-ašdum invoking Ašratum
- Other names: Gubarra
- Major cult center: Larsa, Babylon
- Ethnic group: Amorite

Genealogy
- Spouse: Amurru

Ašratum (𒀭𒀸𒊏𒌈 ^{d}Aš-ra-tum, in Larsa ^{d}A-ši-ra-tum) was a Mesopotamian goddess of Amorite origin. She was regarded as the wife of the god Amurru. Her name is a cognate of Ugaritic Athirat, but despite likely sharing the same origin these two goddesses occupied different positions in the respective pantheons.

== Character ==
Ašratum was a deity of Amorite origin. Her name is a cognate of Ugaritic Athirat, and it is likely they developed from a common source. Multiple etymologies have been proposed for the name, including "holy place" or "sanctuary" (based on the root ʾṯr, "place," attested in both Akkadian and Ugaritic, as well as other Semitic languages) and "wife". However, due to Ašratum's position in the Mesopotamian pantheon and distinct circumstances of her development, information pertaining to her character cannot be necessarily assumed to apply to Athirat, and vice versa. For example, while it is possible Ašratum was associated with eroticism and voluptuousness, no analogous evidence exists for Athirat. In a bilingual Akkadian-Amorite lexical list from the Old Babylonian period which presumably originated in southern Mesopotamia, an Amorite deity named ʾAṯeratum (a-še-ra-tum) is equated with DIĜIR.MAḪ (Bēlet-ilī), but according to Andrew R. George and Manfred Krebernik in this context the name designates the goddess also known from Ugarit.

An Old Babylonian votive inscription of a man bearing the name Itur-ašdum preserved on a limestone slab (BM 22454) is considered to be the most significant source for the study of Ašratum's character. It refers to her as "mistress of voluptuousness and joy" (Sumerian: nin ḫi-li ma-az-bi) and "mistress with patient mercy" (nin ša_{3}-la_{2}-su_{3}). The former epithet might possibly point at erotic connotations. The term ḫili (and its Akkadian equivalent kubzu) denoted a quality of both male and female deities, for example Shamash, Aya, Nanaya and Nisaba. Joan Goodnick Westenholz favors "sensuality" in translations of epithets including it, while Paul-Alain Beaulieu - "voluptuousness." Steve A. Wiggins additionally lists "luxury" as a possible translation. While in past scholarship the latter epithet was used to argue that Ašratum was confused or conflated with Ishtar, more recent research shows that many deities, both male and female (the word nin is grammatically neutral), could be described as nin ša_{3}-la_{2}-su_{3}. It is attested as an epithet not only Ašratum and Ishtar, but also Marduk, Nergal, Ninurta and Sin. It is therefore insufficient evidence for assuming that its use reflected a case of syncretism. Epithets were commonly shared by multiple deities in Mesopotamian religion, and it was not necessarily the result of confusion or conflation. The only evidence for association between Ašratum and Ishtar is an esoteric text from the second century BCE, meant to explain the relationship between the names Ašratum and Gubarra. It has been pointed out that due to its late date and character the text is unlikely to provide information relevant to earlier references to Ašratum.

Ašratum was also one of the goddesses who could be described with the epithet Belet-Seri, most commonly associated with Geshtinanna. It has been argued that it might point at an association with the underworld, though it is also possible the term can be understood as a reference to an ordinary steppe, rather than a euphemism for the land of the dead. In the Nippur god list from the Old Babylonian period, Ašratum nonetheless occurs among underworld deities. Jeremiah Peterson proposes that this might have been the result of her husband Amurru/Martu sometimes being grouped with underworld deities such as Ningishzida, Nergal and Ninazu. Further evidence for Ašratum's possible association with the underworld include the mention of a "corpse star" (^{múl}ADDA) in connection with her in a late mystical text and the use of the epithet ekurrītum, which might have such connotations, to refer to her in the god list An = Anum. Ekurritum was also the name of a goddess in one case listed as a wife of Ningishzida.

Another of Ašratum's epithets, "tenderly cared for by a mountain", is likely connected to her status as wife of Amurru, who was called bēl šadī, "lord of the mountain".

== Worship ==
Oldest attestations of Ašratum are Amorite personal names from the first half of the second millennium BCE, such as Ašratum-ummi, "Ašratum is my mother." Four administrative documents from the reign of Rim-Sîn I of Larsa were signed with seals inscribed with the name Aširatum (^{d}A-ši-ra-tum), a spelling of this goddess' name apparently exclusive to this city. Another early piece of evidence for her worship is a limestone slab which a certain Itur-ašdum, apparently a devotee of this goddess and an official in charge of the Silakku canal district, dedicated for the life of Hammurabi of Babylon. The accompanying text is written in Sumerian. While the provenance of this artifact is not known, it has been proposed that it originated in Sippar. As the inscription mentions the dedication of a protective deity (^{d}lamma), it has been proposed that it was originally a fragment of a figure depicting a lamma goddess. A gudu priest of Ašratum is mentioned in a document from the reign of Samsu-iluna.

Ašratum continued to be worshiped in Babylon in the first millennium BCE. Her temple from that city, Eḫilikalama (Sumerian: "house of the luxuriance of the land") has been dated to the neo-Babylonian period. It has been proposed that it can be identified with a building designated as temple D II during excavations. Ašratum was also still worshiped in Uruk in the Hellenistic period, as indicated by a text enumerating deities partaking in a New Year parade alongside Antu, which also features Amasagnudi, Sadarnunna (the wife of Nuska), Gula, Aya and Shala. It has been pointed out that these deities were not otherwise associated with Antu, and therefore it is assumed the formation of this group was most likely a late, synthetic development.

== Associations with other deities ==
Ašratum was commonly regarded as the wife of Amurru, also known as Martu. However, there are also instances where he was described as married to goddesses usually associated with Ningishzida, such as Azimua, possibly due to conflation or confusion between him and this god. No children of Ašratum and Amurru are known.

The Itur-ašdum inscription calls her the "daughter in law of An." Some early translations referred to her as the "bride of An", but this is now considered to be a mistake. The Sumerian term used in this text, é-gi_{4}-a, equivalent of Akkadian kallatum, meant both "daughter in law" and "bride", but the latter meaning relied on the social practice of fathers picking the brides of their sons. As an epithet of goddesses, it denotes their status as a daughter in law of a specific deity. For example, Aya was often called kallatum in relation to her position as the daughter in law of Sin and wife of his son Shamash.

Ašratum could be referred to with the Sumerian name Gubarra. In some bilingual texts, Ašratum and Amurru appear in the Akkadian version, side by side with Gubarra and Martu in the Sumerian passages. Steve A. Wiggins assumes that Gubarra was a distinct goddess in origin, but came to be identified with Ašratum. In the so-called Canonical Temple List (CTL) known from the Library of Ashurbanipal, there is a reference to a temple of Gubarra, but neither its name nor location are presently known. A similar theonym, Nin-gubara (Sumerian: "mistress with loose hair"), is explained as an epithet of Inanna in the god list An = Anum, but it is uncertain if she corresponds to the deity identified with Ašratum.

Ašratum could also be identified with Šarrāḫītu (Akkadian: "the glorified one"), a goddess only attested in late sources from the first millennium BCE. An esoteric text from the second century BCE explains her name as Ašrat aḫītu, "Ašratum the foreigner" or "the other Ašratum."

It has been proposed Ašratum could be associated with the Sebitti due to their placement next to each other in the Nippur god list and a possible reference to such a connection in a lexical text. However, Andrew R. George and Manfred Krebernik tentatively suggest that since the former of these two texts is difficult to reconcile with other attestations of her, a different similarly named deity might be meant in this case instead.
