= Gula (goddess) =

Mesopotamian goddess

- Divine physician
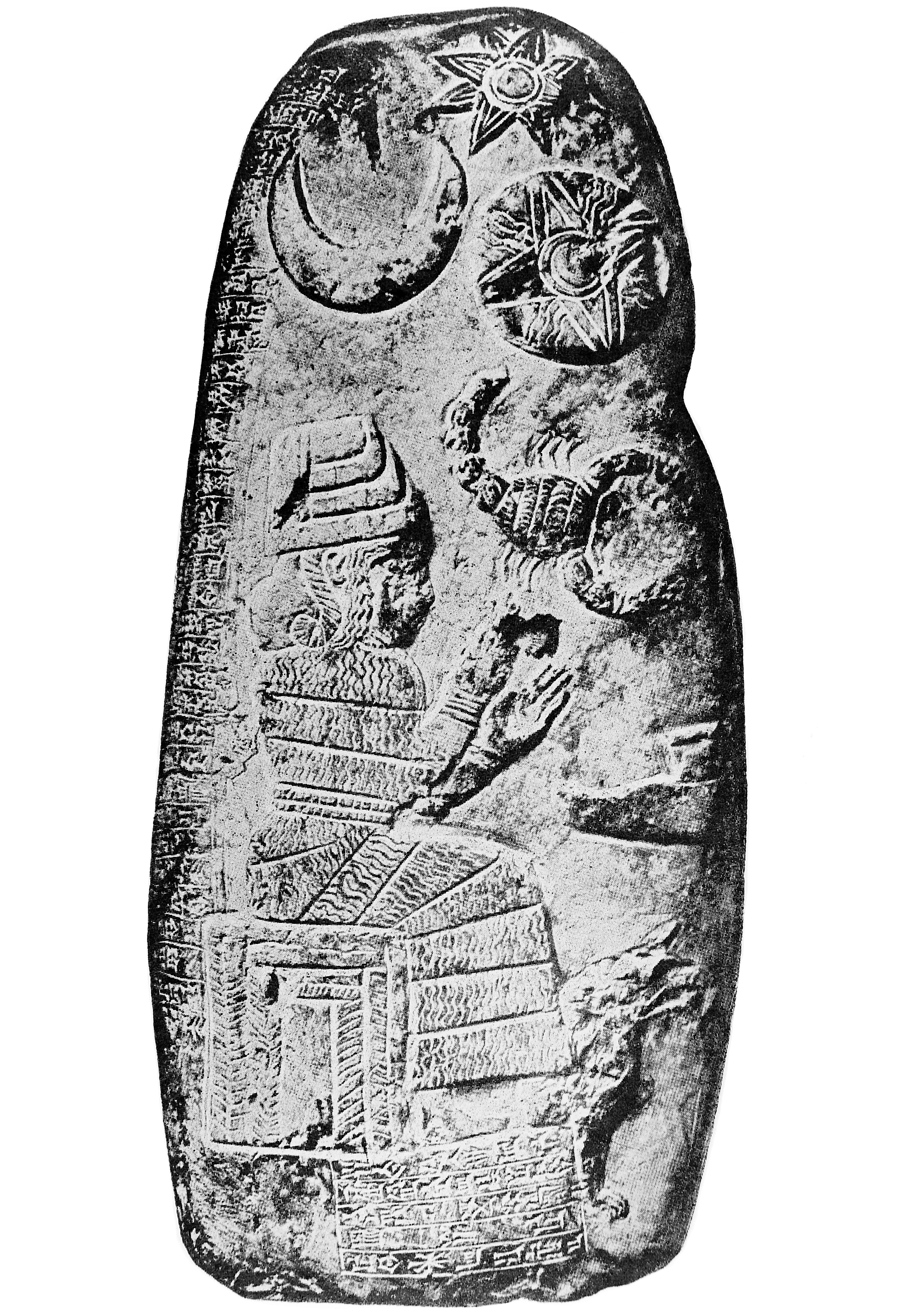
- A healing goddess with a dog on a kudurru
- Major cult center: Umma, later Nippur
- Symbol: dog, scalpel

Genealogy
- Spouse: Ninurta; Mandanu; Abu
- Children: Damu and Gunura

Equivalents
- Isin: Ninisina
- Sippar and Terqa: Ninkarrak
- Nippur: Nintinugga
- Luwian: Kamrušepa

Gula (Sumerian: "the great") was a Mesopotamian goddess of medicine, portrayed as a divine physician and midwife. Over the course of the second and first millennia BCE, she became one of the main deities of the Mesopotamian pantheon, and eventually started to be viewed as the second highest ranked goddess after Ishtar. She was associated with dogs, and could be depicted alongside these animals, for example on kudurru (inscribed boundary stones), and receive figurines representing them as votive offerings.

While Gula was initially regarded as unmarried, in the Kassite period she came to be associated with Ninurta. In Babylon his role could also be fulfilled by Mandanu, while the god list An = Anum links Gula with Pabilsag and Abu. The circle of deities closely associated with her also included Damu and Gunura, who eventually started to be regarded as her children, as well as her sukkal (divine attendant) Urmašum, who might have been imagined as a dog-like being. Through various syncretic processes she could be equated with other goddesses of similar character, including Ninisina, Ninkarrak, Nintinugga, Bau and Meme, though all of them were originally separate, and with the exception of the last of them did not entirely cease to be worshiped separately, even though their individual cults did decline. A well known composition dedicated to describing Gula's syncretic associations is the Gula Hymn of Bulluṭsa-rabi, which seemingly was copied by Mesopotamian practitioners of medicine during their formal training.

It is conventionally assumed that Gula originated in Umma, where she is well attested in the Ur III period, though possible older references are present in texts from Adab. In the following centuries, her cult spread to other cities, including Nippur, which eventually came to be regarded as her primary cult center, as well as Uruk, Babylon, Ur and Lagash. After the conquests of Hammurabi, she was also introduced to Larsa, Sippar and Isin. In the Kassite period she started to be worshiped in the newly established royal city of Dur-Kurigalzu. In Assyria Gula only appears for the first time in the Middle Babylonian period. She had temples in Assur, Kalhu, Tabetu and Mardaman. Attestations from outside Mesopotamia, for example from Emar and Ugarit, are largely limited to scholarly texts.

== Name ==
Gula's name has Sumerian origin and is usually understood as "the great." Based on context the common word gula could also mean "greater," "greatest," "former," "capital" or "main." In sources from the Ur III period, the word "gula" was sometimes used simply as an epithet added to names of various deities: references to "Inanna-gula," "Ninhursag-gula" or even "Alla-gula" are known. It was also applied to the medicine goddess Ninisina, for example in an offering list from Lagash and in a hymn from the reign of Ishbi-Erra. It has been proposed that the goddess Gula was herself initially an epithet, but gradually morphed into a separate deity. A well known comparable example of a Mesopotamian deity who developed this way is Annunitum, who was initially an epithet of Ishtar.

=== Gu_{2}-la_{2} ===
Jeremiah Peterson states that Gula (𒀭𒄖𒆷) and Gu_{2}-la_{2} (𒀭𒄘𒇲), who frequently appears in god lists in association with Abu, were most likely understood as two orthographies of a single theonym, though he accepts the possibility that they were originally separate deities, and notes they might have continued to be recognized as such as late as in the Old Babylonian period. Researchers who support this proposal include Marcos Such-Gutiérrez, Joan Goodnick Westenholz and Irene Sibbing-Plantholt. Evidence in favor of this possibility includes the location of the respective cult centers of Gula and Gu_{2}-la_{2} in different parts of Mesopotamia in the Ur III period, lack of any indications that the writing gu_{2}-la_{2} ever corresponded to the term gula, and separate placement in god lists, though it is not unambiguous. It is also possible that the name of Gu_{2}-la_{2} had a different etymology, with the verb gu_{2}-la_{2}, "to lean over" or "to embrace," being suggested by Sibbing-Plantholt.

Gu_{2}-la_{2} is first attested in the Early Dynastic period in the Fara and Abu Salabikh god lists, as well as in theophoric names. However, she is absent from literary texts, and evidence of her cult is not present in any texts postdating the Old Babylonian period. There is no indication that she was a healing goddess in known sources, and her character is unknown. In the later god list An = Anum Gula, rather than Gu_{2}-la_{2}, appears as the spouse of Abu.

A third goddess who due to her name being homophonous could be connected to or confused with Gula and Gu_{2}-la_{2} was Ukulla, the spouse of Tishpak. Furthermore, Wilfred G. Lambert has identified examples of confusion between the name of Gula and that of the male bricklayer deity Kulla.

=== Ninnibru ===
Ninnibru, also known under the Akkadian form the name, Bēlet-Nippuri, "the lady of Nippur," was a goddess regarded as the wife of Ninurta who first appears in offering lists from the Ur III period. She eventually came to be understood as a form of Gula, and as such ceased to be regarded as a distinct goddess. It is presently uncertain if she was still worshiped as a distinct deity in the Kassite period, when Ninurta was paired with Gula. As Ninnibru, Gula was worshiped in the Ešumeša, a well attested temple of Ninurta in Nippur.

The epithet Ninnibru was sometimes applied to Ninimma, who was usually not the wife of Ninurta, though an exception can be found in the recently published Hymn to Ninimma for Nanne, Nanne being a little known king mentioned also in the Tummal Inscription. Ninnibru is not to be confused with the similarly named Ungal-Nibru/Šarrat-Nippuri, "the queen of Nippur," as both of these names could be used in the same texts to designate distinct goddesses, with the latter understood as a form of Ishtar, rather than Gula.

=== ^{d}ME.ME ===
While Meme was initially a separate goddess, she came to be eventually absorbed by Gula, and her name started to be used as an alternate writing of the latter theonym. As a result, ^{d}ME.ME is attested as a logographic representation of Gula's name for example in the Neo-Babylonian Eanna archive from Uruk and other sources from the first millenjnium BCE, though the association might go further back, to Old Babylonian lexical list.

=== Bēlet-balāṭi ===
Bēlet-balāṭi is attested both as a theonym, written with the dingir sign which served as a determinative designating names of deities in cuneiform, and as an epithet of Gula. In the latter capacity, it can be found in incantations. Irene Sibbing-Plantholt argues that she should be understood either as a deity syncretised with Gula or as her epithet which came to be treated as a separate manifestation of her. Paul-Alain Beaulieu proposes that she might correspond to Manungal, though he also notes she could be considered a form of Gula or a member of the circle of deities associated with her.

=== Amaʾarḫuššu ===
The names Nin-amaʾarḫuššu ("lady merciful mother") and Amaʾarḫuššu ("merciful mother") are applied to Gula in two copies of an explanatory text. According to Julia Krul, it is possible that the latter also served as a stand-in for Gula's name in theophoric names from Uruk from the Hellenistic period. However, Joan Goodnick Westenholz assumed she was a separate goddess only introduced to the local pantheon in late times, similarly as Amasagnudi or Šarrāḫītu.

== Character and iconography ==
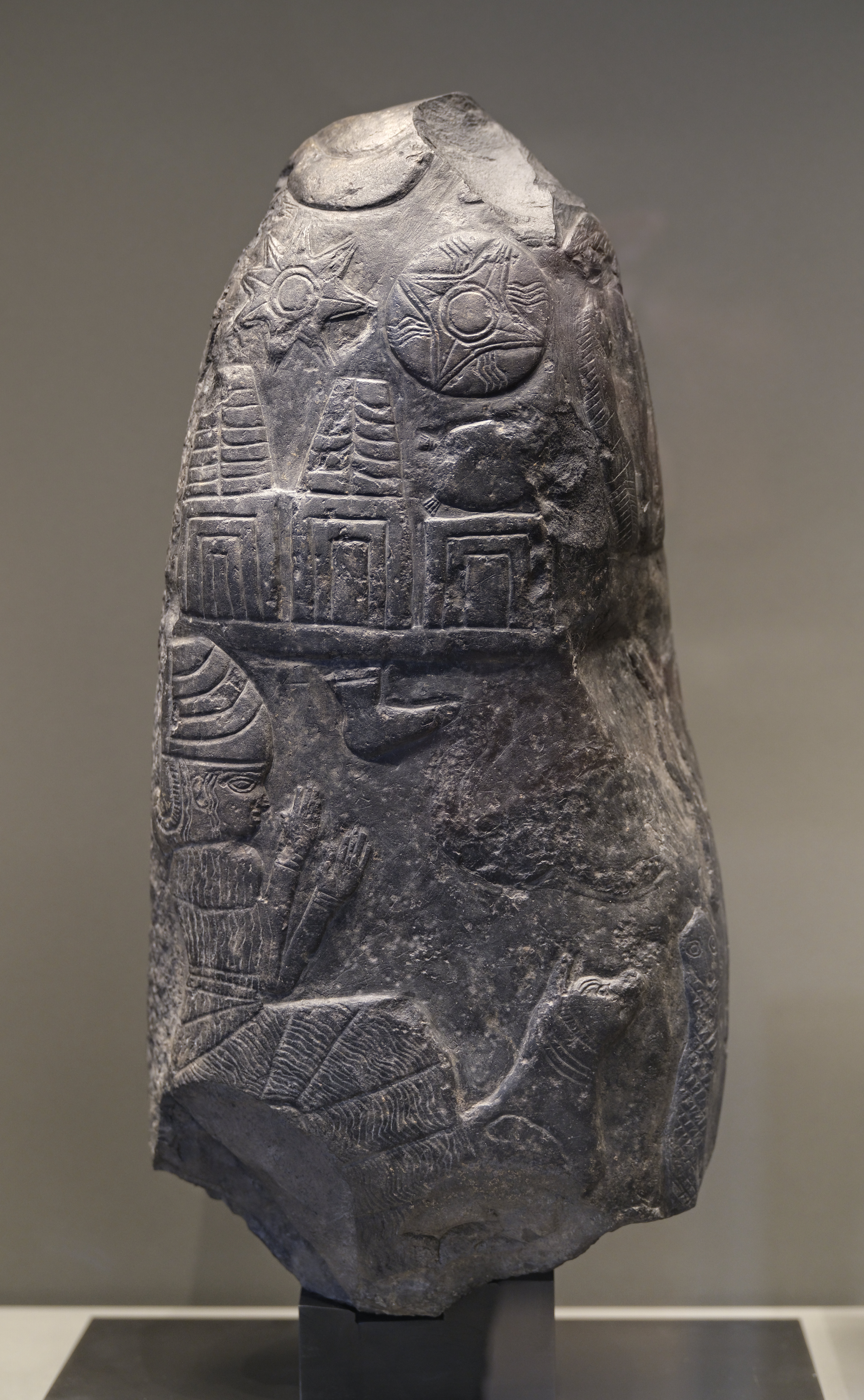
Kudurru of Gula, displayed in the Louvre

Like other Mesopotamian medicine goddesses, Gula was regarded as a divine physician. While the earliest sources do not directly mention that she was perceived as such, an association with healing is implied for example by the fact that offers to her were made by Nawir-ilum, Šu-kabta and Ubartum, well attested high ranking individuals from the Ur III period who worked as asû (physicians). Lack of early references to her character might indicate that she was chiefly worshiped as a healing deity in domestic environments at first. A later hymn calls her "the great doctoress." She could be described as equipped with a variety of tools employed by physicians in ancient Mesopotamia, including various herbal remedies, a razor, a scalpel and a number of other knives or lancets. Like other medicine goddesses, Gula was believed to be able to use illnesses as punishment in addition to healing them. However, in contrast with Ninkarrak, she was not specifically invoked to such ends in curses.

Gula already appears in an incantation from the Ur III period dealing with complication from birth, which states that she was responsible for cutting the umbilical cord. She could also be invoked to determine a favorable destiny for the newborn. As an extension of such roles she was regarded as capable of treating diseases of infants, and functioned as an enemy of the demon Lamashtu. Barbara Böck characterizes the latter as the "counter image" of Gula, based on their contrasting roles as respectively a demon killing infants and a divine midwife. Other protective functions could be assigned to Gula too, for example a Namburbi incantation invokes her in domestic context against the evil influence of a fungus (katarru). She was also sometimes associated with the underworld to a degree. The Gula Hymn of Bulluṭsa-rabi goes as far as having the goddess declare "I bring up the dead from the netherworld." In one incantation she is invoked to counter the harmful influence of Allatum (here a name of Ereshkigal, rather than a distinct deity) on a patient.

Gula's prominence in the Mesopotamian pantheon grew over the course of the second half of the second millennium BCE, and she came to be viewed as one of its main goddesses alongside Ishtar, surpassing Ninhursag in the process. She also eventually eclipsed all the other medicine goddesses.

On kudurru (decorated boundary stones) Gula was depicted in an anthropomorphic form, sitting on a throne, rather than in a symbolic way like most other deities. Nanaya (a goddess of love) and Lamma (minor tutelary goddesses) were the only other female deities depicted similarly, though Gula was represented on kudurru more commonly then them. Many figurative depictions of her are also known from Neo-Assyrian seals, on which she is the most commonly appearing goddess.

The nineteenth day of the month was associated with Gula.

=== Gula and dogs ===
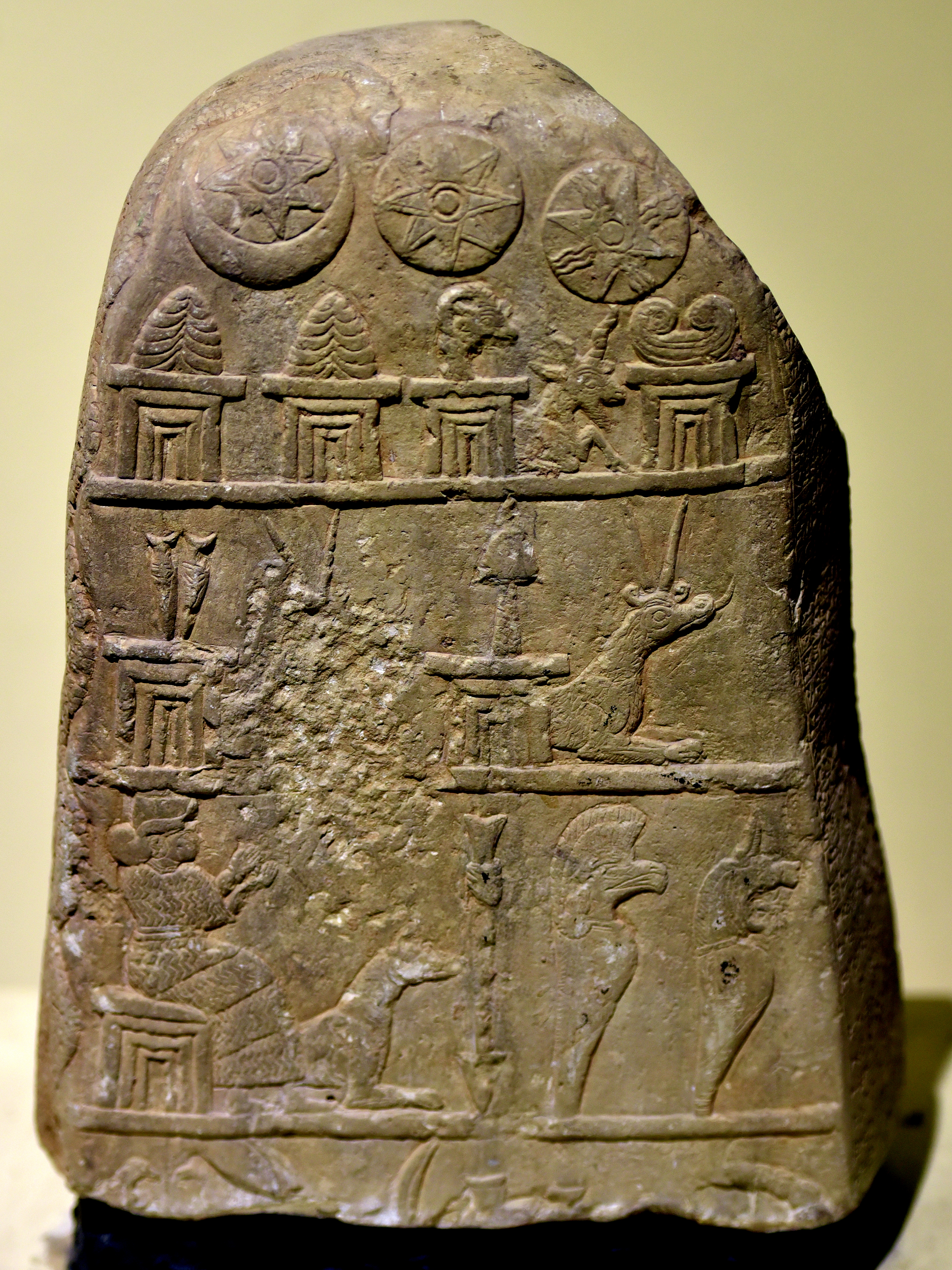
Gula seated upon a shrine, with a dog beside her on a kudurru. Kassite period, 15th-11th century BCE. Iraq Museum, Baghdad

Gula was associated with dogs, and in art could be accompanied by these animals, though their depictions are relatively uncommon. The origin of the link between dogs and Mesopotamian healing goddesses is uncertain, but it has been proposed that it was either the result of observing that saliva of dogs has healing properties, or an extension of a belief that disease can be transferred magically to an animal if it licks the patient. The connection is already attested in the Ur III period, though the oldest evidence is limited to documents which mention meat meant for dogs alongside offerings to Gula, and she only started to receive votive offerings shaped like these animals in the Old Babylonian period. Depictions of the dogs of Gula Textual sources indicate that they could be invoked in oaths, and that they were believed to assist her in combat against Lamashtu. One of the incantations against this demon contains the formula "We are not just any dog, we are dogs of Gula, poised to flay your face, tear your back to pieces, and lacerate your ankles." One Neo-Assyrian text dealing with Babylonian customs states that a dog which crossed the Esabad (one of Gula's temples) was believed to be a messenger sent by her. Both a text referring to Gula being surrounded by "puppies huddled together" and archeological finds indicate she could be associated with young dogs as well, rather than just with adult animals. This connection is also confirmed by the theophoric name Mūrānu-Gula (from mīrānu, "young dog"), attested in the Neo-Babylonian period.

=== Other animal associations ===
In one ritual formula a worm, most likely a leech, is called "the daughter of Gula." It is unclear if this was meant to elevate it to the rank of a demonic creature (similar to how Lamashtu was usually called the "daughter of Anu" and Namtar was occasionally the "son of Enlil") or if it perhaps hints at an otherwise not directly attested medicinal use of leeches in ancient Mesopotamia. There is however no direct evidence of bloodletting being practiced, and the references to it in the Babylonian Talmud are assumed to reflect influence of Greek medicine in the Levant rather than a Mesopotamian tradition. A single incantation (YOS 11, 5:9-14) appears to refer to unspecified worms as "dogs of Gula." Describing other animals as "dogs" is not unparalleled in other Mesopotamian magical texts, as various field pests (including locusts, small birds and caterpillars) were called "dogs of Ninkilim," but no other uses of this figure of speech in relation to Gula are known. Based on these scattered references Nathan Wasserman suggests that a type of worm, possibly a leech, was regarded as Gula's attribute, in addition to the better known association with dogs. This proposal is also supported by Barbara Böck.

The text LKA 20, referred to in scholarship as an "incantation of burnt material," mentions that transgressions not only against dogs, but also cats, such as refusing to break a fight between the animals or not burying their corpses, could be a taboo (ikkibu) of Gula. As of 2014 this reference remains unique, and no other sources mentioning the connection between Gula and cats are known to researchers.

== Associations with other deities ==
In the earliest sources Gula did not have a spouse, and she continued to be regarded as an unmarried goddess through the Old Babylonian period. In documents from the Kassite period, she is addressed as the wife of Ninurta. However, she does not occur in association with him in texts from the archive of the First Sealand dynasty. The god list An = Anum designates Pabilsag as her husband. In Neo-Babylonian Uruk, she could be paired with Ninurta, but also with otherwise unknown deity Bēl-SA-naṣru and with ^{d}IGI.DU, whose identity is a matter of debate in scholarship. While ^{d}IGI.DU could function as a logographic writing of Nergal's name or apparently as an alternate name of Ninurta (the god list CT 25 explains ^{d}IGI.DU as ^{d}nin-urta ina NIM, "Ninurta in Elam"), neither explanation is plausible in the context of the Uruk archives, as all three of them could appear side by side as distinct deities. In Babylon in the same period Mandanu apparently fulfilled Ninurta's role in association with Gula.

Damu, and Gunura, whose mother was initially Ninisina, were sometimes regarded as Gula's children. In sources from Ur from the Ur III period, Gula appears alongside both of them, though in the same period these two deities were associated with Ninisina in Isin and with Nintinugga in Nippur. According to Irene Sibbing-Plantholt evidence for a familial relation between Damu and Gula is not yet present in any Old Babylonian texts. The proposal that Ninazu was viewed as a son of Gula, while repeated in Assyriological publications as recently as in the 1990s, is now regarded as unsubstantiated.

According to the god list An = Anum, Gula's sukkals (divine attendants) were Urmašum (Urmaš in the Old Babylonian forerunner), ^{d}UR (equated with the former) and Uršabiduga. Urmašum is also attested in this role in a late astrological text, where he is equated with the star ^{mul}Lam-mu, representing the divine attendant of Bau. The latter role in earlier sources belonged to the goddess Lammašaga. This astral body was also known as Lamma, and most likely corresponds to Vega. A further attestation of Urmašum has been identified on an Old Babylonian seal. Andrew R. George additionally argues that a temple dedicated to him might have been mentioned in a missing section of the Canonical Temple List dedicated to Gula and her court. It has been proposed that Urmašum was a canine being, as his name starts with the cuneiform sign ur, also present in the words urgi (dog), urmaḫ (lion) and urbarra (wolf). Manfred Krebernik suggests that since his name also contains the element maš, "twin," it is possible that Gula's sukkals were envisioned as a pair of dogs, perhaps represented by a pair of figures guarding a gate. Jeremiah Peterson notes that a handful of possible instances of Urmašum being regarded as female are known. A deity named Urmašum, presumably associated with the underworld, appears in the Weidner god list alongside Malik and Laṣ, but his relation to Gula's sukkal is uncertain. Latarak was regarded as Gula's doorkeeper, possibly due to his ability to ward off illness attributed to him.

Gula was also seemingly believed to be able to mediate with Marduk, the city god of Babylon, on behalf of human supplicants. Odette Bovin tentatively suggests that she was also counted among the deities belonging to the circle of Marduk and his wife Zarpanit in the local tradition from the Sealand. An association between Gula and Adad is also attested. An inscription of Nebuchadnezzar I refers to him as the ummatu of these two deities, though the meaning of this term remains uncertain. Proposed translations include "offspring" or "member of a group of cultic personnel." As late as during the Achaemenid period, Gula received offerings alongside Adad and his wife Shala in Sippar.

The goddess Ninĝagia, "mistress of the cloister," is equated with Gula in an emesal lexical list. Ninĝagia is mentioned in offering lists from the Ur III period, and it has been proposed she had her own sanctuary in Nippur in this period. However, a deity also named Ninĝagia who is described as the "chief housekeeper" (agrig-maḫ) in a temple hymn is instead likely to be Nin-MAR.KI, the daughter of Nanshe. Occasionally Ninazu's spouse Ningirida could be seen as an aspect of Gula, as did Imzuanna, the spouse of Lugal-Marada. A similar association between Gula and Ninsun is also attested, and might have also been the reason behind equating Ninurta with Lugalbanda, though according to Alhena Gadotti the latter development was secondary, and it is implausible to assume that Gilgamesh, the son of Ninsun and Lugalbanda, was ever regarded as a child of Gula and Ninurta.

Two bilingual Akkadian-Kassite lexical lists explain the Kassite goddess Ḫala, otherwise only known from theophoric names from Nippur, Nuzi and possibly Assur, as analogous to Gula, which might indicate she was understood as a healing deity. Luwians seemingly regarded the Anatolian goddess of magic, Kamrušepa, as analogous to Gula, and sometimes magical formulas attributed to the former were direct translations of Mesopotamian ones.

=== Gula and other Mesopotamian healing goddesses ===
While Mesopotamian medicine goddesses (Gula, Ninisina, Ninkarrak, Nintinugga, Bau and Meme) formed an interconnected network, they were initially fully separate from each other, as evidenced by the fact that in the so-called Weidner god list Gula, Ninisina and Ninkarrak occur in separate places. Furthermore, references to medicine goddesses traveling to meet each other are known from various texts. All of them initially had separate cult centers. While Gula was worshiped in Umma, Nintinugga was associated with Nippur, Ninisina with Isin, and Ninkarrak with Sippar and Terqa.

The association between Gula and Ninisina is considered particularly close. Opinions of experts regarding the time at which the process of partial syncretism between these two goddesses started vary. It is agreed that the Old Babylonian period, the worship of Ninisina declined, and that at this point she was already syncretised with Gula. Earlier the medicine goddess of Umma, Gula, was sometimes referred to as "Ninisina of Umma," though likely mostly because scribes in Puzrish-Dagan were more familiar with the goddess of Isin and as a result preferred applying her name to other healing deities. Ninisina herself never occurs in texts from Umma. Barbara Böck argues she was eventually fully absorbed by Gula, but Irene Sibbing-Plantholt instead concludes that the only goddess who met such a fate was Meme, and lists a number of texts from the first millennium BCE which still present Ninisina as a distinct deity, among them a Neo-Babylonian inscription in which she and Gula are mentioned separately from each other.

Documents from Sippar mention individuals serving as sanga priests of Ninkarrak and Gula, Ninisina or Gula, or just Gula alone. The merging of their respective cults in that location was likely caused by an influx of immigrants from Isin in Hammurabi's times. The identification between the goddesses was so close in some cases that an individual called Puzur-Ninkarrak in one document but Puzur-Gula in another, though it is not certain which writing reflects how the name was pronounced. Since the worship of Ninkarrak was well established locally, Irene Sibbing-Plantholt suggests Gula was only understood as her cognomen. No similar phenomenon is attested from any other cities. Additionally, in later sources from Sippar Gula and Ninkarrak were seemingly kept apart from each other.

Two further goddesses associated with medicine, Bau and Nintinugga, were not yet associated with Gula in the second millennium BCE. Irene Sibbing-Plantholt proposes that when syncretised with Gula, Nintinugga functioned as an embodiment of her ability to revive the dead. Her name was used as late as during the reign of Cyrus the Great, though at that time it was most likely just an epithet of Gula according to Paul-Alain Beaulieu. Bau might have functioned as an alternate name of Gula in the Middle Assyrian period, for example in colophons and in a local version of the Weidner god list, but they were not always equated, and the former maintained a distinct role as the wife of Zababa. It has been proposed that the phrase Bau ša qēreb Aššur was used to differentiate between Bau as a name of Gula from Bau as a separate goddess. An incantation explicitly refers to them as two separate deities, and states that Gula owed her status to Bau, credited with elevating her to her position. Separation between Bau and Gula is also attested in sources from Hellenistic Uruk.

There is some evidence that Gula and Ninkarrak could both be treated as analogous to Ninisina in bilingual Sumero-Akkadian texts. Bilingual texts where Nintinugga appears in Sumerian and Gula in Akkadian are attested too. Other deities who could serve as the Sumerian translation of Gula include Damu and Meme, though she could also appear under her own name in both versions of a bilingual text.

=== Gula Hymn of Bulluṭsa-rabi ===
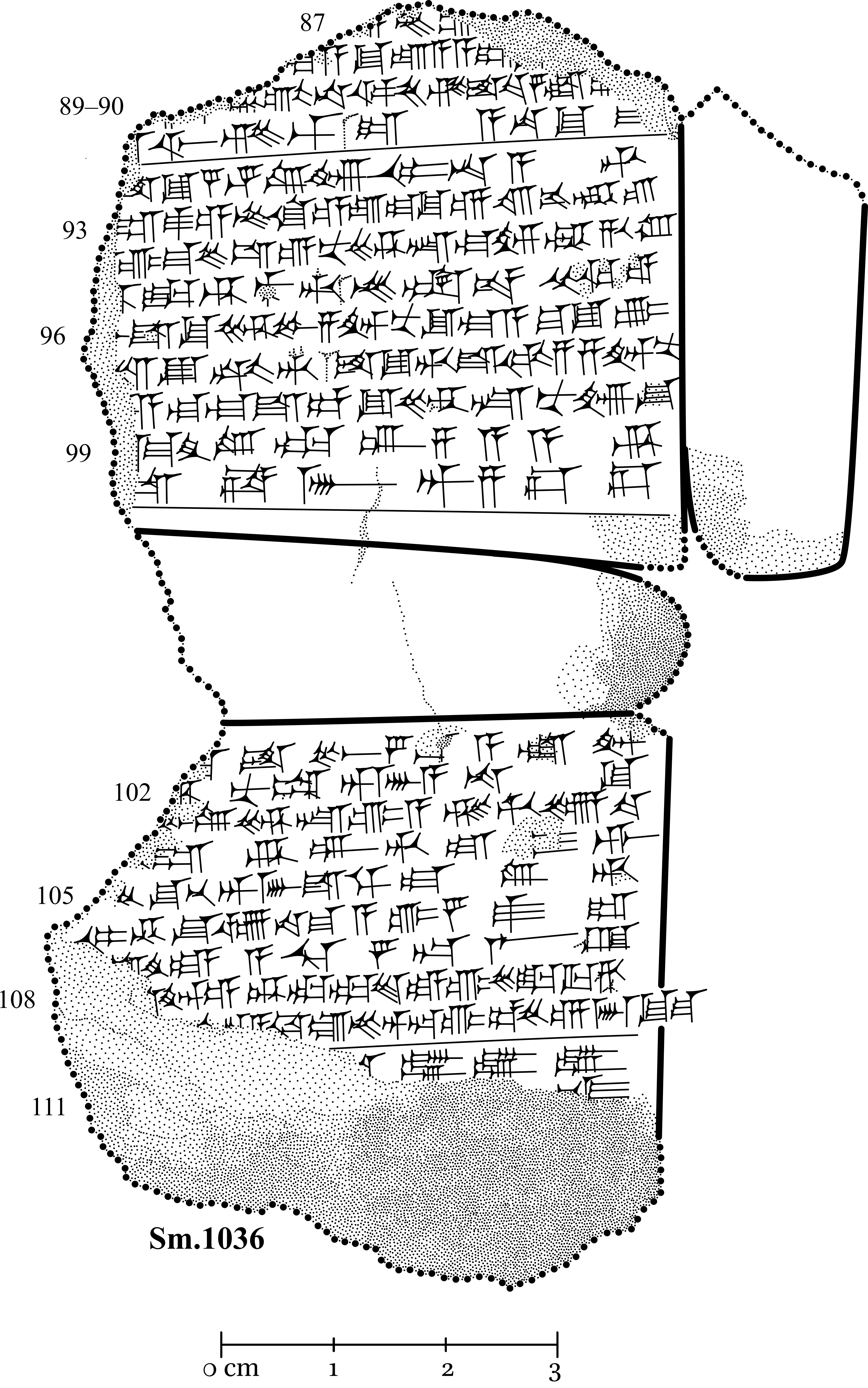
A fragment of a tablet inscribed with the hymn attributed to Bulluṭsa-rabi.

The phenomenon of syncretising other deities with Gula is documented in a hymn describing various identities assigned to her which has been composed by Bulluṭsa-rabi (also spelled Bullussa-rabi) at some point between 1400 BCE and 700 BCE. Based on the initial study of the text undertaken by Wilfred G. Lambert it is assumed it cannot be older, as no similar syncretic hymns are known from the Old Babylonian period, and Ningirsu's description as an agricultural deity included in one of the passages is similarly typical only for later times. Known fragments come chiefly from between the Neo-Assyrian and Seleucid periods, though some might date to Arsacid times. It is considered the best known example of an aretalogy in Mesopotamian literature.

The text consists of 200 lines of cuneiform text, divided into 20 strophes, and it is written in first person, with Gula praising herself and identifying herself with other goddesses. They include Nintinugga, Nanshe, Bau, Ninsun, Ninkarrak, Ungal-Nibru, Ninmadiriga, Ninigizibara, and Ninlil. However, Ninisina is not included among them. The presence of Nanshe and Ninsun has been described as "unexpected" by Joan Goodnick Westenholz, though she also noted both of them are described as fulfilling their distinct roles known from other sources, rather than as medicine goddesses. Irene Sibbing-Plantholt states that the reasons behind presenting Ninlil and Ningizibara as healing goddesses are difficult to explain, as neither is otherwise attested in a healing role, while according to Westenholz the former might be treated as such due to the association between Gula and Sud, and the latter, while chiefly associated with Inanna and described as a harpist rather than a healer, was also connected with Gula in Umma. Furthermore, the strophe focused on the theonym Ungal-Nibru appears to describe temples associated with Ninnibru instead. The goddess' spouse, Ninurta, is identified with various gods too. They include Ningirsu, Zababa, Utulu, Lugalbanda, Pabilsag, as well as Ninazu, whose inclusion might depend on the identification between Gula and Ukulla rather than between him and Ninurta. The number of male theonyms is smaller than that of female ones, since Ninurta and Lugalbanda appear in more than one strophe. Both the names of the goddesses and the spouses were all originally individual theonyms, rather than epithets.

The author's identity is not confirmed by the text itself, where the name is only mentioned in the final lines, which implore Gula for a blessing, but the Catalogue of Texts and Authors from Nineveh attributes not only this hymn but also further, presently unidentified, compositions to this person. The name Bulluṭsa-rabi means "her curing is good," implicitly referring to Gula. Wilfred G. Lambert assumed that the author of the hymn was male, but Zsombor J. Földi notes that subsequent discoveries indicate that while Bulluṭsa-rabi was presumed to be a man in sources from the first millennium BCE, in earlier sources from the Kassite period this name was seemingly only used by women, which depending on the exact date on composition might also mean this specific individual was a woman.

It is assumed that copying the Gula Hymn of Bulluṭsa-rabi was a part of formal training of professional healers in the first millennium BCE. The fact that Gula attributes her medical knowledge to Ea according to Irene Sibbing-Plantholt might reflect the fact that in royal courts, the position of asû (physicians) was lower than that of the āšipu, who were associated with this god.

== Worship ==
=== Earliest attestations ===
It is conventionally assumed that Gula appears for the first time in sources from the reign of the Third Dynasty of Ur, and that the initial center of her cult was Umma. In early documents she is often designated as "Gula of Umma" or "Gula of KI.AN," a nearby settlement. However, according to Irene Sibbing-Plantholt the fact she was not one of the tutelary deities of the city of Umma, unlike Shara and his wife Ninura, might indicate that she originated elsewhere. Gula's cult in Umma in the Ur III period has nonetheless been characterized as "thriving." A festival which took place there was centered on her mourning the temporary death of Damu.

Marcos Such-Gutiérrez suggests that an older reference to Gula might be present in a text from Adab from the Old Akkadian period. Her presence in this source is also accepted a possibility by Joan Goodnick Westenholz and Irene Sibbing-Plantholt in more recent publications, though the latter author concludes that "the evidence (...) does not allow for clear conclusions."

=== Uruk ===
Gula is already attested in Uruk in sources from the Ur III period. However, she is absent from texts from the Old Babylonian period, possibly because kings from the dynasty of Isin introduced Ninisina into the local pantheon, leading to the disappearance of Gula, though she was later reintroduced. A temple dedicated to Ninisina, the Egalmaḫ, is mentioned in an inscription of the local king Sîn-kāšid. According to Andrew R. George it is possible that it was later understood as dedicated to a manifestation of Gula, as according to him it instead belongs to Bēlet-balāṭi in a document from the late first millennium BCE. He also notes that the fact in the Epic of Gilgamesh it is the name of the temple of Ninsun might have been influenced by a version of the Weidner god list which equates this goddess with Gula. However, Paul-Alain Beaulieu has questioned George's assumption that the temple name É.GAL.EDIN is simply a scribal mistake for Egalmaḫ, and pointed out that Bēlet-balāṭi was apparently understood as a separate goddess from Gula in Uruk. The assumption that the Egalmaḫ was a temple of Gula is accepted by Julia Krul.

In the Neo-Babylonian period, three manifestations of Gula were worshiped in Uruk: Gula, Gula ša kisalli ("of the courtyard") and Gula of Bīt-Gula, apparently associated with a small settlement located nearby. Her temple was apparently a part of the Eanna complex. Among the offerings she received according to administrative texts were salt, dates, barley (in some cases meant for brewers or bakers in her service), beer and various sacrificial animals (oxen, sheep, ducks, geese and turtledoves).

In Seleucid Uruk Gula was one of the divine participants in a parade held during a New Year festival as a member of entourage of Antu, alongside deities such as Shala, Aya, Amasagnudi, Sadarnunna and Ashratum. However, for uncertain reasons she is entirely absent from theophoric names from the same period. Julia Krul points out that while some deities, for example Nabu, ceased to be invoked in them due to change in political relations between individual cities, it is unlikely that Gula is an example of this phenomenon, as the connection between Uruk and Nippur, her primary cult center in this period, remained close.

=== Nippur ===
Gula was introduced to Nippur in the Old Babylonian period, though not much evidence of her early cult in this city exists. She only became a major deity in the local pantheon the Kassite period. At this time, she came to be the second most commonly invoked goddess in theophoric names from this city, which indicates she enjoyed popularity in the sphere of personal religion. In late sources, Nippur was the city she was most strongly associated with, though through much of her history she was not tied to a single specific cult center. She most likely occurs alongside the deities of Nippur, namely Enlil, Ninlil and Ninurta, in an inscription of Marduk-balassu-iqbi. It is possible that a temple bearing the name Egalmaḫ which formed a part of the Ekur complex was dedicated to Gula in the role of the wife of Ninurta. In 1990 Oriental Institute excavators identified a building in area WA as the Temple of Gula, a goddess of healing and consort of Ninurta. The earliest identified construction of the temple was in the Isin-Larsa period, with major rebuilds in the Kassite, Neo-Assyrian, and Neo-Babylonian periods. It is thought that the missing temple of Ninurta is nearby.

Textual sources indicate that in later periods, the temple of Gula in Nippur housed many other deities, including Ninurta, Damu, Kurunnam, Kusu, Urmaḫ, Nuska, Ninimma, Shuzianna, Belet-Seri, the Sebitti, Bēl-āliya, Sirash and Ninĝirzida. Kurunnam or Kurunnitu (^{d}KAŠ.DIN.NAM) was a goddess associated with beer, named after kurunnu, a type of this beverage regarded as high quality, and presented as analogous to Ninkasi in lamentations. Kusu was a purification goddess, the personification of a type of ritual censer, already attested in texts from Lagash. Urmaḫ, the deified lion, was also worshiped in Assur, in this case alongside Sumuqan. Nuska was the divine attendant (sukkal) of Enlil. Ninimma was a goddess associated with writing, though also attested in a Gula-like healing role. Shuzianna was regarded as a secondary wife of Enlil. Belet-Seri was the Akkadian counterpart of Geshtinanna, and also appears in Gula's entourage elsewhere in the first millennium BCE. Sebitti were a group of seven warlike gods usually associated with Nergal. Bēl-āliya has been characterized by Paul-Alain Beaulieu as an "anonymous divine mayor." He remarks that this theonym was most likely a generic title and could designate many deities in various locations, for example Pisangunug in Kullaba. Lists of as many as twelve "divine mayors" are known. Sirash was a deity associated with brewing, often paired with Ninkasi, either as her sister or Akkadian equivalent. Ninĝirzida was a minor goddess whose name can be understood as "lady of the right knife," perhaps to be translated as "scalpel" in this context.

=== Babylon and Borsippa ===
In the city of Babylon, Gula was worshiped in a temple initially built by the king Sumu-abum for Ninisina, perhaps to be identified with the Egalmaḫ, "exalted palace," which formed a part of the Esagil complex. She had a second temple there as well, the Esabad, "house of the open ear," which was rebuilt by Ashurbanipal and Nebuchadnezzar II and survived as late as in the Arsacid period. Additionally the name Eḫursagsikila, house, pure mountain, which was usually assigned to a temple of Ninkarrak, is associated with Gula in a few inscriptions instead.

In Borsippa, considered to be interconnected with Babylon in the sphere of religion, Gula is attested at least since the Neo-Assyrian period. Nebuchadnezzar II restored her temple in this city, the Egula, "big house." A secondary manifestation of this goddess worshiped locally, Gula (ša) abbi, most likely to be understood as "Gula of the ancestors," might have been either a remnant of a domestic cult predating Gula's presence in royal inscriptions from Borsippa, or an unidentified local deity who came to be equated with her.

A late cultic calendar presumed to come from either Borsippa or Babylon connects Gula with the mourning rites of Enmesharra: "Gula set up weeping for Enmešarra, who had been defeated."

=== Other southern cities ===
Gula was already present in the local pantheon of Ur in the Ur III period, though there is no indication that she belonged to the circle of the city god, Nanna. It has been proposed that a temple built there by Warad-Sin, which according to an inscription was dedicated to Ninisina, in reality belonged to Gula, as the former of these two goddesses is otherwise entirely absent from sources from this city. According to Joan Goodnick Westenholz, sporadic early attestations of Gula are also available from Lagash as well.

It has been argued that in the Old Babylonian period, Gula was overall one of the most popular goddesses, as in sources such a personal letters she appears with comparable frequency to Annunitum, Aya, Ninsianna and Zarpanit, though less commonly than Ishtar. However, despite presumed popularity in the sphere of personal worship, she is rare in Old Babylonian theophoric names.

In Larsa, Gula was only introduced after the city was conquered by Hammurabi of Babylon. Her cult in this city is poorly documented, though her temple has been identified during excavations, and based on its size it is presumed that she was a major deity in the local pantheon. Furthermore, she also appears in documents from Isin for the first time after its conquest by the same king. While the tutelary goddess of the city, Ninisina, continued to be invoked in royal inscriptions, Gula apparently was worshiped more commonly than her after the city was rebuilt by Kurigalzu I. The Egalmaḫ, "exalted palace," apparently came to be associated with her, despite originally being a temple of Ninisina. During excavations, a dog cemetery which formed a part of its complex has been discovered. Hammurabi also introduced the worship of Gula to Sippar, though her importance there remained minor through the Old Babylonian period and she is similarly scarcely attested there in the Kassite period. Sources dated to the reign of Nabopolassar attest that she had a temple there, the Eulla, "house of rejoicing."

While Gula is the only healing goddess mentioned in the documents of the First Sealand dynasty, her cult only had a marginal importance in its territories.

In the Kassite period, the clergy of Nippur was responsible for establishing the cult of Gula in Dur-Kurigalzu, a new city built by Kurigalzu I to act as his royal residence. She also appears in theophoric names from this site, such as Gula-balāṭa-ēriš and Uballiṭsu-Gula. Furthermore, a possible temple dedicated to her has been discovered during excavations. Temples of Gula also existed in Dūr-Enlilē and Ḫilpu. In the latter city, she was worshiped jointly with Ninurta in the Emupada, "house chosen by name." This city was apparently located between Dur-Kurigalzu and Sippar, on the Euphrates. She was also possibly worshiped in the temple Ezibatila in Marad. Additionally, Egašantina, "house of the lady of life," which is mentioned in an unpublished hymn, might have also been a temple of Gula.

=== Assyria ===
Gula is absent from Old Assyrian sources. She was only introduced to Assyria in the second half of the second millennium BCE, when a temple dedicated to her was built in Assur, possibly by Tukulti-Ninurta I, though the only clear evidence is a later inscription of Adad-nirari II which attributes this construction project to him. It bore the name Esabad. While the temple of Assur is also well attested in sources from the Neo-Assyrian period, a new one was also built in Kalhu by Ashurnasirpal II when he made it the new royal residence. A further Assyrian temple of Gula, possibly bearing the name Egalmaḫ, existed in Ṭābetu.

According to documents from the reign of Tukulti-Ninurta I, Mardaman also had a temple of Gula, but it cannot be presently established if it replaced the one belonging to the earlier city goddess, Shuwala. There is no evidence that the latter was still worshiped after the Assyrian conquest of the city. While earlier Old Babylonian texts from Mari indicate Mardaman was known for the presence of skilled practitioners of medicine, its tutelary goddess was not associated with healing. Irene Sibbing-Plantholt proposes that Gula, who was unknown in Upper Mesopotamia before the Middle Assyrian period, was introduced to the city because of the reputation of its healers.

=== Outside Mesopotamia ===
It is assumed that attestations of Gula from outside Mesopotamia, specifically scholarly texts from Hattusa, Ugarit and Emar, indicate that she "traveled with scholars to all the corners of the cuneiform world." A man bearing the theophoric name Kidin-Gula resided as a scribal school teacher in the last of these three cities, though it is presumed he arrived there from Mesopotamia. With the exception of theophoric names, the worship of Gula is not attested in Emar, and according to Gary Beckman's survey of the local pantheon the attestations come exclusively from colophons. In Ugarit she appears in an incantation written in Akkadian alongside the goddess Bizilla, here referred to as the "lady of relief," be-let tap-ši-iḫ-ti.
