= Amurru (god) =

Mesopotamian god representing the Amorites

- Divine representation of Amorites in the Mesopotamian pantheon
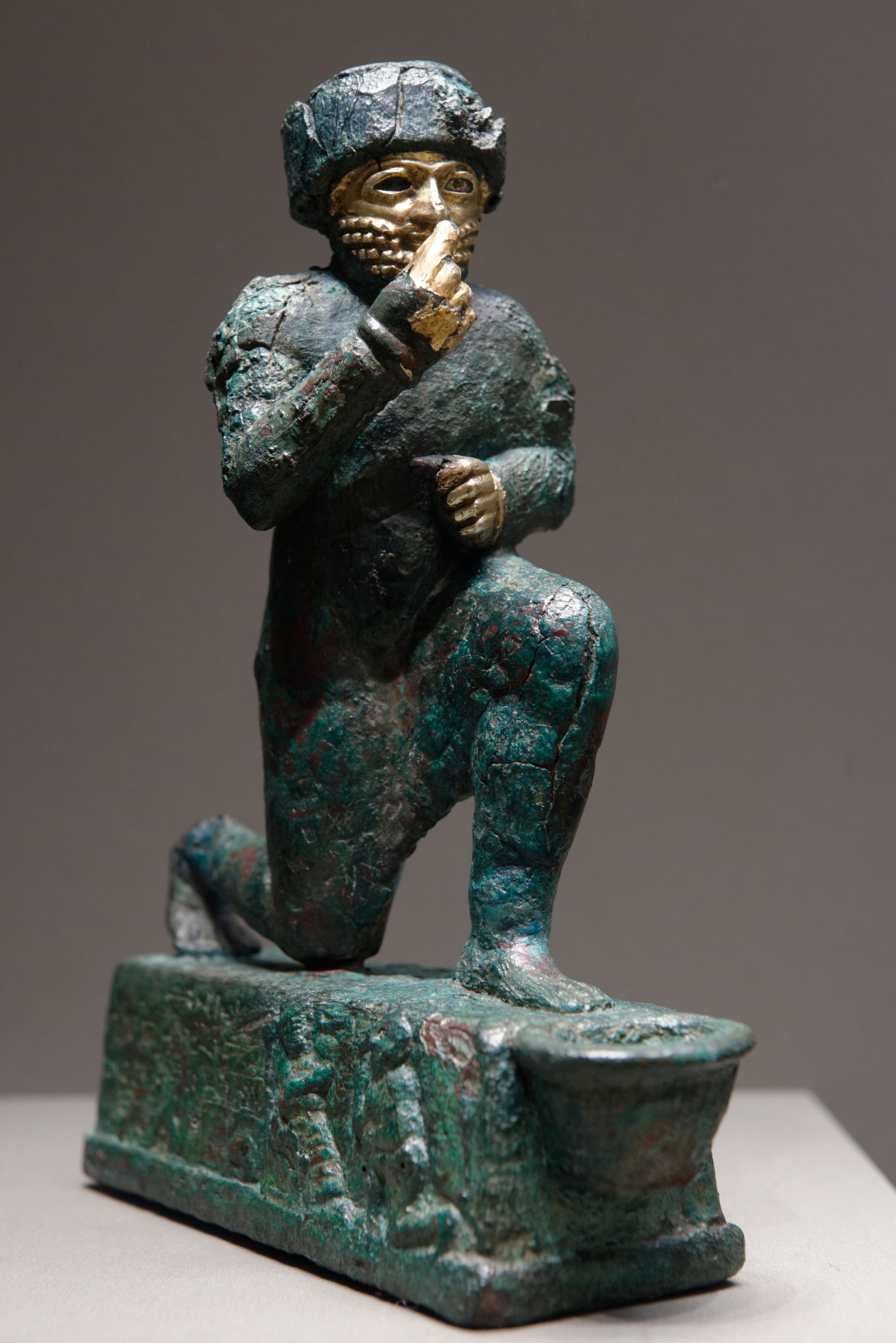
- The "Worshipper of Larsa", a votive statuette dedicated to Amurru for Hammurabi's life, early 2nd millennium BCE, Louvre
- Other names: Martu
- Major cult center: Babylon and an unknown city in the Sealand
- Symbol: gamlu (a type of staff), gazelle
- Parents: Anu and Urash
- Consort: Ashratum; Adgarkidu; Geshtinanna (rarely)

Amurru, also known under the Sumerian name Martu (in Sumerian and Sumerograms: 𒀭𒈥𒌅), was a Mesopotamian god who served as the divine personification of the Amorites. In past scholarship it was often assumed that he originated as an Amorite deity, but today it is generally accepted that he developed as a divine stereotype of them in Mesopotamian religion. As such, he was associated with steppes and pastoralism, as evidenced by his epithets and iconography. While this was initially his only role, he gradually developed other functions, becoming known as a god of the mountains, a warlike weather deity and a divine exorcist.

He is first attested in documents from the Ur III period, chiefly in Sumerian and Akkadian theophoric names. Later he also came to be worshiped in Babylon, Assur and other locations in Assyria and Babylonia. He had his own cult center somewhere in the area known as the Sealand in Mesopotamian texts.

Only a single myth about Amurru is known. It describes the circumstances of his marriage to Adgarkidu, the daughter of Numushda, the city god of Kazallu. Other sources attest different traditions about the identity of his wife. The goddess Ashratum is particularly well attested in this role. His father was the sky god Anu and it is presumed that his mother was usually Urash.

== Origin ==
Amurru was a divine representation of the Amorites, a group living in areas west of Mesopotamia. The names Amurru (Akkadian) or Martu (Sumerian) could refer both to the god and to the people. The origin of both these words is unknown, and according to Paul-Alain Beaulieu neither of them has a plausible Sumerian, Akkadian or West Semitic etymology. There is also no indication that either of them ever served as the endonym of the groups they described.

In older literature, as late as the 1980s, it was commonly assumed that Amurru originally an eponymous deity of the Amorites themselves. However, there is general agreement that he was instead a Mesopotamian god representing the westerners.

Amurru is absent from Amorite names from the Ur III period. The evidence from the Old Babylonian period is similarly lacking: while around seven thousand linguistically Amorite names are known, none of them are theophoric names invoking Amurru. However, he appears within many Sumerian theophoric texts as Martu, especially in texts from Lagash. He is also attested in Akkadian names, though even in this case his popularity appears to be smaller in areas where a higher percentage of population was Amorite, for example in the kingdom of Mari, while in Nippur, where very few, if any, Amorites lived, they are common. Tonia Sharlach notes that the perception of Amorites in Mesopotamia is a complex issue. While literary texts describe them as archetypal barbarians, and walls were built on the borders to prevent their entry, king Shulgi was supposedly proficient in the Amorite language, and people of Amorite origin held various offices in the royal administration, and could serve as priests. Most likely the creation of a god representing them was meant to provide them with a symbolic place in Mesopotamian religion due to their growing political importance.

Other analogous deities are also attested: Kaššû and Kaššītu, a pair of deities, respectively male and female, represented the Kassites, Aḫlamayītu was "the Aramean goddess," while Sutītu - "the Sutean goddess." However, these deities only emerged in the first millennium BCE, and are not attested earlier.

== Character ==
In texts from the Ur III and Old Babylonian periods, Amurru chiefly functioned as a divine stereotype of Amorites. However, he gradually acquired other functions, possibly due to the growing power of Amorite dynasties in the early second millennium BCE and due to assimilation of Amorite groups into Mesopotamian society. In the Kassite period, when Amorites ceased to function as a distinct group in Mesopotamia, Amurru lost his initial function as a representation of them. As early as in the Old Babylonian period, he came to be viewed as a divine exorcist. This became his primary role at least until the reign of Sennacherib.

An association between Amurru and steppes is well attested. He could be called bel seri, "the lord of the steppe." His wife, Ashratum, was referred to with the feminine equivalent of the same title, belet seri. Due to the fact that the logogram KUR could refer to both steppes and mountains, Amurru also came to be associated with the latter environment. While the related phrase ^{d}KUR.GAL (sometimes shortened to ^{d}KUR or simply KUR) usually designated Enlil, there is evidence that from the Kassite period onward it could be employed to represent Amurru. Examples include theophoric names from Kassite Nippur and texts from Neo-Babylonian archive of the Eanna temple in Uruk. Amurru's role as a mountain god is particularly commonly referenced in hymns, where his most frequent epithet is "the man of the mountains," lu hursagga. A mountain range particularly frequently associated both with the god and with the historical Amorites in Mesopotamian texts was Bashar, known today as Jebel Bishri.

Amurru's character has also been sometimes compared to that of a weather god, and in hymns he could be described as a warlike deity armed with lightning. However, he was regarded as separate from Ishkur/Adad, and his other functions did not overlap with those of weather deities.

=== Iconography ===
Amurru's main attribute was the gamlu, a type of crooked staff. Its presence has been used to identify depictions of this god on cylinder seals. It has been proposed that the gamlu was originally a type of ordinary staff used by shepherds, perhaps to be identified with the ^{giš}gamlum gula Martu, "large Amorite crooked staff," mentioned in a text from the Isin-Larsa period. The word gamlu and its Ugaritic equivalent gml has been interpreted as referring to a type of scimitar or sickle in the past, but according to Aicha Rahmouni this translation is incorrect.

In art, Amurru could be accompanied by a horned animal interpreted as either a goat or a gazelle. In some case the animal alone could be used as a symbolic representation of the god. There is also textual evidence for an association between him and mice. It is possible the latter association was initially derogatory and was meant to imply the Amorites bring rodents with them.

Amurru is sometimes described and depicted as a sickle sword (^{giš}zubi/gamlum).

== Worship ==
Earliest indisputable evidence of the worship of Amurru comes from the Ur III period. The only possible older attestation is a name known from a document from the reign of Shar-Kali-Sharri, now considered to be dubious. Evidence for state-sponsored veneration of Amurru in the Ur III period is scarce, with only five documents mentioning offerings to him. Tonia Sharlach assumes that he was initially associated with Eridu and Kuara, as according to one of the known documents he received offerings in a temple of Damkina in the latter of these two cities.

Amurru came to be more commonly worshiped during the reign of the First Dynasty of Babylon. Later texts attest that two temples of Amurru existed in this city: Enamtaggaduha (Sumerian: "house which undoes guilt") located in its eastern part and Emesikil ("house of pure mes") on the opposite side. A statue of the god from the former was renewed by Esarhaddon. A temple bearing the name Emesikil was also rebuilt by Damiq-ilishu, but according to Andrew R. George it is uncertain if it was the same one known from texts about Babylon or if Amurru had a separate temple in Isin. Paul-Alain Beaulieu in a more recent publication favors the former possibility.

As early as in the Old Assyrian period, Amurru was also worshiped in Assyria, as attested in oath formulas. In Assur he was worshiped in the Enindabadua ("house where bread portions are baked"), which was likely a part of the temple complex of Gula. It was rebuilt by Tiglath-Pileser I. Additionally, Sennacherib installed new doors depicting Ashur accompanied by Amurru in the akitu temple of the former god. Paul-Alain Beaulieu proposes that in this case Amurru was reinterpreted as a divine representation of Arameans, who rose to prominence in Assyrian society in the first millennium BCE. He points out that in the same time period, the god started to appear in West Semitic, rather than Akkadian, theophoric names for the first time in history, which might indicate that the Arameans living in Assyria chose him as their tutelary deity.

Amurru's newfound popularity among speakers of West Semitic languages is also attested in the late sources from Babylonia, where he is the fourth most common deity in their theophoric names after Bel (Marduk), Nabu and Nanaya. Much of the evidence for this phenomenon comes from the Sealand, where he likely had a cult center of his own. References to it are known from the Eanna archive from Uruk. For example, one text mentions legal proceedings between two citizens of the Sealand province during which a priest and a scribe from the temple of Amurru acted as witnesses.

== Associations with other deities ==
Anu was regarded as Amurru's father. It has additionally been proposed that a variant writing of Amurru's name, AN.^{d}MARTU (AN.AN.MAR.TU) represents a "conjoined deity" consisting of Amurru and Anu. However, according to Tonia Sharlach and Paul-Alain Beaulieu it most likely should be read as the genitive Akkadian phrase ^{d}Il Amurrim, "the god of Amurru," a reading according to them supported by a Hurrian translation known from a bilingual text from Emar, ^{d}e-ni a-mu-ri-we, which has the same meaning. Beaulieu also points out that a Hurrian ritual text from Ugarit written in the local alphabetic script mentions i[n] amrw, which he assumes to be another reference to the Hurrian translation of Il Amurrim. Daniel Schwemer accepts that AN.AN.MAR.TU is simply a form of Amurru, but argues that the genitive interpretation is incorrect, and the name should instead be read as Ilamurrum, an extended form of the standard name, formed in an analogous way to the also attested Iluwer (Wer) or to the name of the god Ilaba. He also assumes that i[n] amrw is more likely to be a collective term, "gods of the land of Amurru" (in this context referring to the kingdom south of Ugarit), as it appears in sequence with in alḏyg and in ugrtw, terms which according to him are likely to refer collectively to "gods of Alashiya" and "gods of Ugarit" than to singular otherwise unattested deities.

Dietz Otto Edzard argued that the fact Amurru was regarded as a son of Anu and not Enlil might stem from his position in Mesopotamian religion. He was a comparatively minor god. Another possibility is that the comparisons between him and Ishkur contributed to the development of this genealogy. It is possible that Amurru's weather god-like profile was in part based on the fact that Hadad was the most popular god among the Amorites, but no direct evidence in favor of this interpretation is available. They shared the epithet Rammānu, "thunderer." The image of warlike Amurru known from some of the hymns dedicated to him might also be a result of association with the weather god. However, they were not equated, and could appear together on cylinder seals. There is also no indication that the logogram ^{d}IŠKUR could ever serve as a representation of Amurru's name. In a single text, Nimgir, normally the sukkal (attendant deity) of Ishkur, appears in the circle of Amurru instead.

Due to widespread recognition of Anu as Amurru's father, it is agreed that Urash was most likely regarded as his mother in most cases. A single reference to Ninhursag as his mother is most likely based entirely on similarity of the meaning of her name and his epithet lu hursagga. It has been proposed that the deity Suḫanunna, mentioned in the myth Marriage of Martu, was also viewed as his mother but this has been called into question. Suḫanunna might instead be an epithet of Amurru himself, possibly "he of the thriving body."

A single hymn refers to Amurru as the "first born of the gods of Anshan." This was most likely a reference to Amorite settlement in areas east of the Tigris, in the proximity of Elam, or possibly specifically to the background of Kudur-Mabuk of Larsa, known for his Amorite and Elamite connections.

Multiple traditions regarding the identity of Amurru's wife are known. In Marriage of Martu he marries the goddess Adgarkidu, described as the daughter of Numushda and Namrat. However, especially in cylinder seals inscriptions he often appears alongside Ashratum, a goddess of Amorite origin whose name is a cognate of that of the Ugaritic goddess Athirat. Ashratum could also be referred to with the name Gubarra, and in bilingual texts the pair Amurru and Ashratum in Akkadian correspond to Martu and Gubarra in Sumerian. It has been argued that she could be also identified with Amurru's spouse known from the aforementioned myth. Additionally, due to the use of the epithet Belet-Seri to refer to Ashratum, in a few cases Amurru was regarded as the husband of Geshtinanna (or Azimua), also associated with this title, even though she was usually the wife of Ningishzida instead. In Amurru's presently unidentified first millennium BCE cult center in the Sealand his spouse was the goddess Innin-galga-sud.

No references to Amurru having any children are known.

In a single inscription Amurru is paired with Ninegal/Belet Ekallim. According to Wilfred G. Lambert, this pairing is unusual, as unless an otherwise not attested tradition conflated Amurru with her spouse, the farmer god Urash, the two deities have nothing in common.

In laments, Amurru could be associated with Enkimdu. It has been suggested that their juxtaposition was meant to function similar to the pairing of Dumuzi and Enkimdu in a myth in which they compete for Inanna's hand, with Amurru taking the role of a shepherd god meant to contrast with Enkimdu's own functions as a divine farmer.

An etymological connection between Amurru and the Ugaritic god Qudšu-wa-Amrur, known from the Baal Cycle where he is the "fisherman of Athirat," has been proposed. According to this theory, the latter deity's name might be a compound of Amurru and the epithet qdš, "holy." However, Steve A. Wiggins points out that the evidence is not conclusive, as the term Amurru is spelled as amr in the alphabetic Ugaritic texts, while "Amrur" in Qodesh-wa-Amrur's name - as amrr. Additionally, no known epithet of Amurru is analogous to Ugaritic qdš.

== Mythology ==
The number of known literary texts about Amurru is small. The only known composition focused on him identified as a myth is Marriage of Martu.

In the beginning of this composition, Martu (Amurru), portrayed as a leader of a group of nomads, learns from his mother that his relatives receive bigger rations despite their lower rank because they have their own families. Because of that, he decides to get married. One of his allies tells him about a festival taking place in the city of Inab, either an alternate name of Kazallu or a smaller settlement located close to it. The city god of this location, Numushda, as well as his wife Namrat and daughter Adgarkidu, will attend it, and a wrestling or fighting contest will be held as entertainment. Martu's peer urges him to take part in it. The protagonist agrees and emerges victorious from the games, but when Numushda offers him the reward, silver and various precious stones, he asks for Adgarkidu's hand in marriage instead. Numushda agrees, but he expects Martu to bring various marriage gifts, mostly livestock. The next passage is poorly preserved, but apparently a person whose name is not presented distributes various valuable items among the inhabitants of Inab. Most likely either Numushda does so to celebrate the marriage of his daughter, or Amurru to gain the favor of his father-in-law's followers. A friend of Adgarkidu apparently tries to dissuade her by describing Martu's lifestyle unfavorably, highlighting that he does not pay proper respect to Nanna, roams the countryside digging for truffles and lives in a tent, but her words are dismissed by the bride herself.

It has been argued that Marriage of Martu was composed in the Ur III period, and reflected either a political event, perhaps the arrival of Amorites in the province governed by Puzur-Numushda during the reign of Ibbi-Sin, or simply the introduction of a new deity, Amurru, to the Mesopotamian pantheon.

Outside of this myth, Amurru and Numushda almost never appear together, the only exceptions being two laments. One of these two texts also includes the only other known reference to Inab.
