= Ninkarnunna =

Mesopotamian god

Ninkarnunna (^{d}Nin-kar-nun-na, Sumerian: "lord of the exalted quay") was a Mesopotamian god who belonged to the circle of deities associated with Ninurta. He was the bar-šu-gal (possibly "masseur") of this god. A litany refers to him as the "good child" (dumu sagga).

According to the god list An = Anum, Ninkarnunna's brother was Inimmanizi, the sukkal (vizier) of Ninurta. According to Wilfred G. Lambert it is possible that some copies instead regard Ninkarnunna as a female deity and the spouse of Inimmanizi. An association between Ninkarnunna and Inimmanizi is also attested in astronomical texts.

A temple of Ninkarnunna existed in Nippur. In Babylon, he was worshiped in the E-rabriri, the temple of Mandanu, which lead Antoine Cavigneaux and Mandred Krebernik to propose that Mandanu might have been syncretised with Ninurta in this city. His seat in the latter temple was known as E-ushumgal-anna, "house of the dragon (ushumgal) of heaven."

Ninkarnunna is mentioned in Angim.
