= Zakharenko =

Zakharenko Захаренко Захаранка
- Pronunciation: Russian pronunciation: [ˈzaxaˌreŋ̊ko]

Origin
- Languages: Belarusian, Ukrainian and Russian from Hebrew
- Meaning: God Has Remembered
- Region of origin: Russia, Ukraine, Belarus

Other names
- Variant forms: Zakharov, Zakharchenko, Zacharias, Zakaryan

Zakharenko (Belarusian: Захаранка, Ukrainian: Захаренко, Russian: Заха́ренко; from the given names Zakhar (Захар), Zakhary (Захарий/Захарій), or Zakhariya (Захария/Захарія)—all East Slavic variants of the Hebrew name Zechariah—by adding the (primarily Ukrainian) Slavic diminutive suffix -енко (-enko) with the meaning "young", "small", "son of") is a Belarusian, Ukrainian and Russian masculine surname. Notable people with this surname include:

- Andrei Zakharenko (born 1979), Russian association football player
- Sergey Zakharenko (born 1974), Belarusian skier
- Yury Zacharanka (Zakharenko) (1952–1999?), Belarusian military officer and politician
- Natalie Wood (born Natalia Nikolaevna Zacharenko, 1938), American actress

== See also ==
- Zakharenkov
- Zakharchenko
