= Zakar =

Zakar is a Hebrew word meaning "to remember".

It may also refer to:

== Places ==
- Gavrah Zakar, village in Lorestan Province, Iran
- Zakar (crater), a crater on Ganymede

== People ==
- Zakar Zakarian (1849–1923), French-Armenian painter
- Ferenc Polikárp Zakar (1930–2012), Hungarian Cistercian monk

== Other ==
- Zakar-Baal, the king of Byblos
- Zaqar (also known as Dzakar), a god of dreams in Mesopotamian mythology

== See also ==
- Zakaryan, a surname
