= Kittum =

Mesopotamian goddess of truth

- Divine embodiment of truth
- Other names: Niĝgina
- Major cult center: Sippar, Bad-tibira, Raḫabu

Genealogy
- Parents: Utu/Shamash and Aya
- Siblings: Mamu, Sisig

Kittum, also known as Niĝgina, was a Mesopotamian goddess who was regarded as the embodiment of truth. She belonged to the circle of the sun god Utu/Shamash and was associated with law and justice.

== Character ==
Kittum's name means "truth" in Akkadian and she was regarded as a divine hypostasis of this concept. Kittum's Sumerian counterpart, Niĝgina, is not attested before the Old Babylonian period, and it is possible that the Akkadian name was older, which would make Niĝgina an artificial translation. A possible forerunner to the idea of a goddess embodying truth are proverbs or dialogues copied in scribal schools in which truth was personified. Names with the element niĝgina are already attested in sources from the Ur III period, one example being Niĝginaidug ("truth is good"), but there is no indication that they were necessarily theophoric, and the word is written without the dingir sign which preceded divine names. Kittum could alternatively be equated with another of Utu's courtiers, Nigzida, but the meaning of the latter name was not identical, and terms like "fidelity" or "righteousness" are considered more accurate translations.

Kittum was one of the deities associated with law and justice. She could be invoked in legal texts as a divine witness.

== Associations with other deities ==
There are differences regarding the position of Kittum in Utu's court between individual copies of An = Anum. She usually appears as the first of his daughters, but some copies instead refer to her as his sukkal (divine vizier), and one lists Kittum and Niĝgina as two separate deities, with the former referred to as a son and the later as a daughter of Utu. Jacob Klein argues that Kittum was regarded as the sun god's "primary" daughter. He points out a text describing her as the "beloved daughter of Utu" (dumu kiag ^{d}Utu) is known. The deities Mamu and Sisig were regarded as her siblings.

Iqbi-damiq functioned as Kittum's sukkal. Instances of a sukkal having a sukkal of their own, while known, should be regarded as an anomaly according to Richard L. Litke. Iqbi-damiq's name means "she said 'it is fine!'" Wilfred G. Lambert's earlier translation, "he spoke, it is pleasant," presumed Iqbi-damiq was male. However, a text referring to her as a "daughter" is now known. She is also attested in the god list An = Anum and in Šurpu. An illness called "hand of Iqbi-damiq" is mentioned in a medical text alongside "hand of Nanaya" and "hand of Kanisurra."

== Worship ==
Sources from the Old Babylonian period attest the existence of two temples of Kittum, one in Bad-tibira and another in Raḫabu, a settlement located near Larsa. Their ceremonial names are presently unknown, and available documents simply refer to both as É ^{d}Ki-it-tim.

In offering lists from Sippar, Kittum commonly appears alongside Mīšaru, a deity from the circle of Adad who was also associated with justice. In the Neo-Babylonian period both of them were additionally grouped with Ūmu and Dajjānu. It is possible that she was among the deities worshiped in Ebabbar, the temple of Shamash located in this city. Outside Sippar, the pair Kittum and Misharu is also attested in the Tākultu ritual from Assur. References to this pair as the "attendants of Ekur" (mazzāz Ekur) are also known from Neo-Assyrian sources.

Theophoric names invoking Kittum are known from Larsa and Ur, two examples being Kittum-lizziz and Apil-Kittum. She is also attested in women's theophoric names from Old Babylonian Mari. She is one of the seven goddesses appearing in names with the element -šimhī, the other six being Annu, Admu, Ishtar, Išḫara, Aya and Tabubu. The name Kittum-šimhī can be translated as "Kittum is my joy". She is also one of the Mesopotamian deities who appear in Akkadian theophoric names from Susa from the same period.
