= Zakharchenko (disambiguation) =

Zakharchenko (Ukrainian: Захарченко) is a Ukrainian-language surname.

Zakharchenko may also refer to:

- 4244 Zakharchenko, main-belt asteroid
- Zakharchenko, Horlivka Raion, Donetsk Oblast, Ukraine
