= Zakhar =

Zakhar (Russian: Захар) is a given name, the East Slavic form of the biblical name Zechariah or Zachary. Notable people with the name include:

- Zakhar Arzamastsev (born 1992), Russian ice hockey player
- Zakhar Bron (born 1947), Russian violinist and violin pedagogue of Jewish descent
- Zakhar Chernyshyov (1722–1784), Russian field marshal in charge of the College of War from 1763 to 1774
- Zakhar Dubensky (born 1978), association football midfielder from Russia
- Zakhar Kalashov, notorious gangster and thief in law in the Russian-Georgian Mafia
- Zakhar May (born 1969), modern Russian musician, author of many hits
- Zakhar Pashutin (born 1974), Russian professional basketball coach and former player
- Zakhar Petrov (born 2002), Russian Olympic canoeist
- Zakhar Prilepin (born 1975), Russian writer, political dissident, member of Russia's unregistered National Bolshevik Party since 1996

The name gives rise to patronymic surnames: Zakharaw, Zakharenko, Zakharik, Zakharov, Zakharchuk.

== See also ==
- Zakar (disambiguation)
- Zaqar
