= Zakaryan =

Zakaryan (in Armenian: Զաքարյան) or Zakarian (in Western Armenian: Զաքարեան) is an Armenian surname, originating from Zakar, the Armenian equivalent of the name Zechariah, which means "God has remembered". The name may refer to:

- Arlette Zakarian, Austrian lawyer and politician
- Armen Zakaryan (born 1989), Armenian-born Russian amateur boxer
- Avag Zakarian, Armenian noble
- Garbis Zakaryan (1930–2020), Turkish boxer
- Garo Zakarian (1895–1967), Armenian conductor and composer
- Geoffrey Zakarian (born 1959), American chef
- Glakho Zakaryan (1905–1992), Armenian singer
- Khoshak Zakarian, female member of the Zakarid dynasty of Armenia
- Khosrov Zakarian, Armenian and Kurdish landholder
- Lusine Zakaryan (1937–1992), Armenian singer
- Michel Der Zakarian (born 1963), Armenian football player and manager
- Ruth Zakarian (born 1966), American actress and model
- Sargis Zakarian, Georgian politician
- Serop Zakaryan, Armenian politician
- Vanik Zakaryan (1936–2023), Armenian scientist
- Vardan Zakaryan, German boxer
- Zakar Zakarian (1849–1923), Armenian painter

== See also ==
- Zacharias (surname)
- Zakar (disambiguation)
