= Zagar (god) =

Mesopotamian god of dreams

- God of dreams
- Other names: Anzagar

Genealogy
- Parents: Shamash (father); Aya (mother)
- Siblings: Mamu, Sisig

Zagar (also read Anzagar) was a Mesopotamian god associated with dreams. He shared this role with other deities, such as Mamu and Sisig. Like them he was regarded as a son of the sun god Shamash and his wife Aya. He is attested in a number of prayers and in literary texts such as Lugalbanda in the Mountain Cave and Self-Praise of Shulgi.

== Name ==
Zagar's name could be written in cuneiform as AN.ZA.GÀR or ^{d}AN.ZA.GÀR (AN.AN.ZA.GÀR). It is unclear if the first variant should be read as Zagar, with the AN (dingir) sign serving as a determinative, or as Anzagar, with the determinative omitted. The theonym ^{d}lugal-AN.ZA.GÀR despite phonetic similarity is unrelated, and according to Manfred Krebernik the element AN.ZA.GÀR in this case is most likely a toponym derived from the Sumerian word "tower". While written with the same signs, the dream god's name was likely instead an Akkadian loanword in Sumerian, related to the root *ḏkr, "to remember", and the word zakāru, "to speak".

== Character ==
Zagar was considered a minor deity. He was regarded as a god of dreams (Akkadian: ilu ša šutti). According to a prayer to Nuska (preserved on the reverse of KAR 58, lines 1–17) he was responsible for bringing dreams to sleepers. The Mesopotamians considered them to be messages from the gods.

Zagar's role was not exclusive to him, and other sources indicate dreams could also be brought by a major deity, a personal tutelary deity, or another dream deity such as Mamu or Sisig. The frequency at which specialized dream deities were referenced grew with time, which might reflect either the growth of a belief that humans are separated from major members of the pantheon by a network of intermediaries acting as divine messengers, or alternatively the possibility that relevant sources from the first millennium BCE, such as dream books, reflect the beliefs of individuals from lower strata of society, possibly more likely to invoke minor deities, though this remains speculative.

== Associations with other deities ==
Zagar is listed alongside Mamu and Sisig among the children of Shamash and Aya in the god list An = Anum. Anette Zgoll speculates that the placement of dream deities in the circle of the sun god reflected the belief that dreams were equally clear to a dreamer as anything seen in daylight. Manfred Krebernik instead suggests that it depended on Shamash's well attested association with divination.

It is possible that Zagar could be called the "Shamash of Dreams" or "Enlil of Dreams". However, according to Ryan D. Winters the latter title might be a misreading based on a passage from An = Anu ša amēli which equates Enlil with AN.AN.ZA.GAR. This deity is defined as "Enlil of battle" (ša_{2} an-na-ti) in this context and might be unrelated to the dream god.

A prayer to Nuska refers to Zagar as a messenger of Marduk. A prayer to Sin expressing the wish to receive an absolve from past wrongdoings from this god in a dream brought by Zagar on his behalf is also known.

== In literary texts ==
Zagar appears in the text Self-praise of Shulgi (also known as Shulgi the Avenger or Epic of Shulgi), where he informs the eponymous king in a dream that the gods will support him in battle.

In the epic Lugalbanda in the Mountain Cave, Zagar appears to Lugalbanda in a dream to instruct him how to prepare aurochs and goats he hunted for as an offering to the gods.
