= Zakharchenko =

Zakharchenko (Ukrainian: Захарченко) is a Ukrainian-language surname, derived from the given name Zakhar. Notable people with the surname include:

- Alexander Zakharchenko (1976–2018), Ukrainian separatist leader during the war in Donbas
- Andrei Zakharchenko
- Lyubov Zakharchenko (1961–2008), Russian poet and singer-songwriter
- Maria Zakharchenko-Schulz (1893–1927), Russian White Movement activist
- Mariya Zakharchenko
- Mikhail Vaschenko-Zakharchenko (1825–1912), Ukrainian mathematician
- Stanislav Zakharchenko (born 1994), Russian footballer
- Vadim Zakharchenko
- Vitaliy Zakharchenko (born 1963), Ukrainian government minister (suspended from duties by the Ukrainian parliament)
- Yevgeni Zakharchenko (born 1978), Russian footballer
