= Sisig (mythology) =

Mesopotamian dream god

- God of dreams
- Other names: Zaqīqu

Genealogy
- Parents: Shamash (father); Aya (mother)

Sisig, also known under the Akkadian name Zaqīqu, was a Mesopotamian god. He was regarded as a god of dreams, though he was not the only Mesopotamian deity associated with them. The Neo-Assyrian oneiromancy compendium Iškar Zaqīqu was named after him. He’s also attested in the Old Babylonian myth Death of Gilgamesh, in an incantation from the same period, and in the god list An = Anum. The latter two of these sources describe him as a son or messenger of the sun god Shamash.

In the late first millennium BCE in Hatra the Akkadian form of Sisig's name appears in theophoric names, but it might have functioned as a term for deified ancestors, rather than as the proper name of a singular deity like in earlier sources.

== Name and character ==
Sisig's name was written in cuneiform as si-si-ig. Like other theonyms, it was usually prefaced by the determinative dingir, though exceptions where it is omitted are known. He was also known under the Akkadian name Zaqīqu. Ziqīqu is attested as a variant form. In addition to phonetic spellings, in Akkadian AN.ZA.GAR_{3} (usually read as Zagar) could function as a logogram meant to be read as Zaqīqu.

Sisig was regarded as a god of dreams. However, other dream deities are also attested, for example Mamu. Iškar Zaqīqu, an eleven tablet compendium of oneiromancy written in Akkadian known from the library of Ashurbanipal, was named after the Akkadian form of Sisig's name.

The Akkadian form of the name, if written without the dingir sign, could also refer to ghosts, though this meaning is not attested for the Sumerian form. (Note: While the term etemmu is also commonly translated as "ghost", it was not interchangeable with zaqīqu. As noted by Takayoshi M. Oshima, descriptions of etemmu appear to imply the existence in the form of a tangible, physical body rather than just a wind-like spirit like in the case of zaqīqu.) Furthermore, zaqīqu can also be translated as "puff of air" instead depending on context. The translation "emptiness" has also been proposed. However, according to Andrew R. George the word was only used to refer to emptiness or nothingness metaphorically, which parallels similar use of šāru, "wind".

Anette Zgoll suggests that the use of Zaqīqu as a name of a god of dreams might be derived from a possible belief that a person's zaqīqu ghost represented them in dreams, both their own and those of others. However, it has also been argued that Sisig was primarily understood as a ghost-like underworld god, and his association with dreams was a secondary development. George assumes that the use of zaqīqu to refer to ghosts and a dream god reflected the perception of ghosts and entities associated with dreams as equally intangible as a gust of wind.

Enrico Marcato notes that while in Hatra in the late first millennium BCE Zaqīqā, a derivative of zaqīqu, is attested as a theonym, it seemingly functioned as a generic designation for deified ancestors, since in a single case it is used to describe two individuals presumed to be deceased members of a single family, presumably worshiped in a small shrine. In addition to sources from Hatra, this term might occur in similar context in contemporary texts from Dura-Europos, and earlier on in theophoric names from the Neo-Assyrian period, such as Bar-zāqê.

== Associations with other deities ==
In the god list An = Anum, Sisig is listed alongside Mamu, another dream deity, among the children of Shamash (Utu) and his wife Aya. He is also referred to as a son of Utu in the Old Babylonian myth Death of Gilgamesh. In an incantation from the same period, a forerunner of later Bīt rimki, he is described as his messenger or herald.

Despite originally being associated with the sun god, in Neo-Assyrian and Neo-Babylonian sources Sisig is attested as a mediator between Sin, the moon god, and human petitioners. However, this association was new exclusive, and it might reflect a broader belief in his ability to mediate with various deities.

== Mythology ==
Sisig is mentioned in the myth Death of Gilgamesh. In the Me-Turan version he might be responsible for informing Gilgamesh about burial and mourning rites which will be held for him after he dies. He is also attested in the version from Nippur, but his role in it is unclear. He is seemingly described as a source of light in the underworld. However, this ability is not attested for him anywhere else, and he was never associated with any celestial bodies, which according to Dina Katz might indicate the passage is a metaphor, possibly referring to the easing of mind or more generally to positive values.

The term sisig also occurs in Gilgamesh, Enkidu, and the Netherworld, but due to both lack of a "divine determinative" (dingir) before it and the context of the passage it is unlikely that the god is meant in this case; it is possible that like Akkadian zaqīqu it is used to refer to a gust of wind.
