= Zakharenkov =

Zakharenkov, feminine: Zakharenkova is a Russian surname ultimately derived from the given name Zakhar". Notable people with this surname include:

- Aleksandr Zakharenkov (1926-1989), Russian nuclear physicist and statesman
- Andrey Zakharenkov, birth name of Prokhor Chaliapin (born 1983), Russian singer
- Irina Zahharenkova (born 1976), Estonian pianist and harpsichordist
- Maksim Zakharenkov, Russian shogi player
