= Shamash =

Mesopotamian sun god

Shamash 𒀭𒌓
- God of the sun and justice
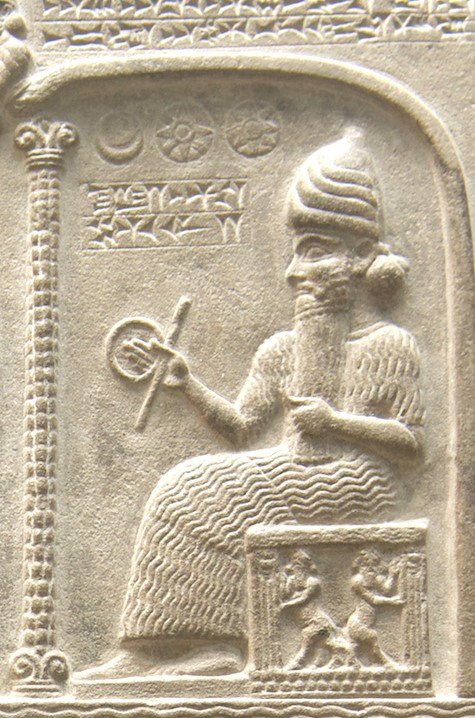
- Representation of Shamash from the Tablet of Shamash (c. 888 – 855 BC), showing him sitting on his throne dispensing justice while clutching a rod-and-ring symbol
- Other names: Utu, Amna
- Major cult center: Sippar, Larsa
- Abode: Heaven
- Planet: Sun
- Symbol: saw, rays of light, solar disc, winged sun
- Number: 20
- Mount: Sun chariot

Genealogy
- Parents: Nanna and Ningal
- Siblings: Inanna/Ishtar (twin sister); Manzat (in a single Maqlû incantation); Pinikir (through syncretism with Ishtar)
- Consort: Aya/Sherida
- Children: Mamu, Kittum, Sisig, Zagar, Šumugan, Ishum

Equivalents
- Hurrian: Šimige
- Ugaritic: Shapash
- Hittite: Sun goddess of Arinna, Sun goddess of the Earth, Sun god of Heaven
- Luwian: Tiwat
- Elamite: Nahhunte

Shamash (Akkadian: šamaš (Note: Akkadian šamaš "Sun" was cognate to Phoenician: 𐤔𐤌𐤔 šmš, Classical Syriac: ܫܡܫܐ šemša, Hebrew: שֶׁמֶשׁ šemeš, Arabic: شَمْس šams, Ashurian Aramaic: 𐣴𐣬𐣴 šəmeš(ā))), also known as Utu (written 𒀭𒌓; Sumerian: ^{d}utu, literally "Sun"), was the ancient Mesopotamian sun god. He was believed to see everything that happened in the world every day, and was therefore responsible for justice and protection of travelers. As a divine judge, he could be associated with the underworld. Additionally, he could serve as the god of divination, typically alongside the weather god Adad. While he was universally regarded as one of the primary gods, he was particularly venerated in Sippar and Larsa. The moon god Nanna (Sin) and his wife Ningal were regarded as his parents, while his twin sister was Inanna (Ishtar). Occasionally other goddesses, such as Manzat and Pinikir, could be regarded as his sisters too. The dawn goddess Aya (Sherida) was his wife, and multiple texts describe their daily reunions taking place on a mountain where the sun was believed to set. Among their children were Kittum, the personification of truth, dream deities such as Mamu, as well as the god Ishum. Utu's name could be used to write the names of many foreign solar deities logographically. The connection between him and the Hurrian solar god Shimige is particularly well attested, and the latter could be associated with Aya as well.

While no myths focusing on Utu are known, he often appears as an ally of other figures in both Sumerian and Akkadian compositions. According to narratives about Dumuzi's death, he helped protect him when the galla demons tried to drag him to the underworld. In various versions of the Epic of Gilgamesh and in earlier Gilgamesh myths, he helps this hero defeat the monstrous Humbaba. In the myth Inanna and An, he helps his sister acquire the temple Eanna. In How Grain Came to Sumer, he is invoked to advise Ninazu and Ninmada.

== Name ==
The two most common names of the sun god used in Mesopotamian texts are Sumerian Utu and Akkadian Shamash. A further relatively commonly attested name is Amna, whose origin is uncertain. The most common writing of the sun god's name was the logogram ^{d}UTU, which could be read as Utu, Shamash, or, as attested in the god list An = Anum, as Amna. Syllabic spellings of all three of these names are also known. A further logographic spelling used the numeral 20, which was associated with him.

=== Etymology ===
The name Shamash is a cognate of Akkadian terms šamšu ("sun") and šamšatu ("solar disc"), as well as the words referring to sun in other Semitic languages, such as Arabic šams and Hebrew šemeš. The linguistic connection between the name of the god and the corresponding celestial body has been compared to that between Adad (and Syrian Hadad) and the word addu, "storm." The Amorite form of the name is Samsu, as attested for example in the theophoric name Samsu-iluna ("Samsu is our god"). The ancient Aramaic form of the name was most likely Śameš, though many variant syllabic spellings are attested. Additionally, the name for the sun in Mandaean cosmology, Shamish (Classical Mandaic: ࡔࡀࡌࡉࡔ), is derived from Akkadian Shamash.

=== Grammatical gender ===
Utu was understood as a masculine deity. According to Manfred Krebernik, this most likely also resulted in his Akkadian counterpart being viewed as such, even though in the majority of Semitic languages both the word referring to the sun itself and names of solar deities are grammatically feminine. Julia M. Asher-Greve considers this the oldest attested example of a Mesopotamian deity's gender being impacted by syncretism. However, not all researchers agree with the assumption that the name Shamash was ever understood as referring to a female deity in Akkadian-speaking areas. Christopher Woods argues that the only available evidence are early ambiguous theophoric names, which according to him do not necessarily point at the existence of female Shamash, and might omit prepositions necessary to identify the gender of the deity invoked in them. Manfred Krebernik notes that a well known example of a female deity in what he deems the "cuneiform cultural sphere" is Shapash. At the same time, both the Amorites and the Arameans viewed the solar deity as male, like Sumerians and Akkadians.

=== Secondary names and epithets ===
According to Manfred Krebernik, the name Amna, attested as a synonym of Utu in the god list An = Anum and used to refer to the sun god in an inscription of Nabonidus, might be either connected to the toponym Sippar-Amnanum or to a root attested in Northwest Semitic languages, '-m-n, which can be translated as "to be reliable" or "to be firm."

Dozens of other variant names, epithets or possibly minor deities who came to be seen as synonymous with Utu are attested in god lists. Examples include Karkara (possibly related to Ninkar, one of the names of his wife Aya), Nimindu (possibly related to the name of the goddess Nimintabba), Si'e ("who shines forth"), Ṣalam (possibly a name referring to a winged sun symbol) and U'e ("sunrise").

== Character ==
=== Relative position in mythology ===
The sun god was one of the principal deities of the Mesopotamian pantheon. In the Early Dynastic god list from Fara, he is the sixth among the deities listed, after Anu, Enlil, Inanna, Enki and Nanna. In later god lists, for example in An = Anum, he and his circle appears between Nanna (Sin) and Ishkur (Adad). The Old Babylonian Nippur god list instead places him between Ishkur and Ninurta. Despite Utu's typical high status, it is agreed that the role of the sun and deities representing it in Mesopotamian religion was not comparable to that known from ancient Egyptian religion. Based on the attestations of theophoric names such as Shamash-bel-ili (Akkadian: "Shamash is the lord of the gods"), Shamash-Enlil-ili ("Shamash is the Enlil of the gods") and Shamash-ashared-ili ("Shamash is the foremost of the gods"), Wilfred G. Lambert proposed that a tradition in which he was the supreme god of the pantheon did exist, but never found official support and its spread was limited to the clergy in Sippar and to a smaller degree Larsa. Common epithets characterize Utu as a "youth" (Sumerian šul, Akkadian eṭlu) and "hero" (Sumerian ursaĝ, Akkadian qarrādu).

=== Transportation ===
As a representation of the sun, he was believed to travel every day through the sky from east to west, and at night in the opposite direction through AN.ŠAG_{4}, a "nether sky" located directly above the underworld, though the notion of a night journey only developed later, and in sources from the third millennium BCE Utu usually rests at night. A reference to the latter tradition is also known from the "Standard Babylonian" version of the Epic of Gilgamesh, where Shamash meets with his wife Aya after sunset. Utu's vehicle was a solar chariot, which was pulled by four animals bearing the Sumerian names Uhegalanna ("the abundant light of heaven"), Uhushgalanna ("the terrifying great light of heaven"), Usurmurgalanna ("the dreadful great light of heaven") and Unirgalanna ("the noble light of heaven"). Their species is not entirely consistent, though in most cases the sun chariot is apparently associated with equids: "choice steeds" (niskum) in an inscription of Gudea, horses in various prayers and incantations, and mules in the Epic of Gilgamesh. Manfred Krebernik argues that in early sources, his chariot was drawn by lions, but this has been questioned by Marco Bonechi. Nathan Wasserman in his translation of a fragment of a hymn to Utu mentioning the animals only refers to them as "beasts." Sunrise and sunset were described as the sun god passing through cosmic gates situated on twin mountains on the opposite ends of the world. It was believed that his daily journey let him see everything happening on earth. He was also responsible for protection of travelers. Formulas common in both prayers and literary compositions indicate that he was likely often invoked outside temples, presumably as an astral body. Early morning was likely regarded as the most appropriate time for imploring him for help.

=== Justice ===
Utu was also the primary god of justice, presumably because due to traveling through the sky every day he was believed to see everything that happened in the world. He could be assisted in this role by his father Nanna, his sister Inanna, and various minor judge deities. At least in the third millennium BCE, Ishtaran was regarded as a divine judge equal in rank to Utu, and a fragment of a myth from Ebla mentions a divine tribunal in which they both partake alongside Idlurugu (^{d}ÍD), a river god also known for his association with justice and judgment who represented ordeal by water. A hymn to Utu states that Idlurugu cannot give judgment without his presence. As an extension of his role as a divine judge, Utu could be associated with the underworld, though this connection is not attested before the Old Babylonian period. In exorcisms, he could be implored to help with bringing restless ghosts to the land of the dead. In this capacity he could be associated with the deified legendary king Gilgamesh, commonly portrayed in a similar role.

=== Divination ===
Shamash and Adad were jointly regarded as gods of divination, especially extispicy. The connection between the sun god and the weather god is well attested in Mesopotamian sources and goes back to the Old Babylonian period. Its origin is uncertain, but since in the earliest Sumerian sources Ishkur, who was analogous to Adad, was not associated with divination, it is possible that it was based on the association between Hadad and the solar deity in Ebla and possibly elsewhere in Syria and Upper Mesopotamia. According to a late ritual text, Shamash and Adad were responsible for teaching divination to the mythical king Enmeduranki. Subsequently, he taught it to the people of Sippar, Nippur and Babylon.

== Iconography ==
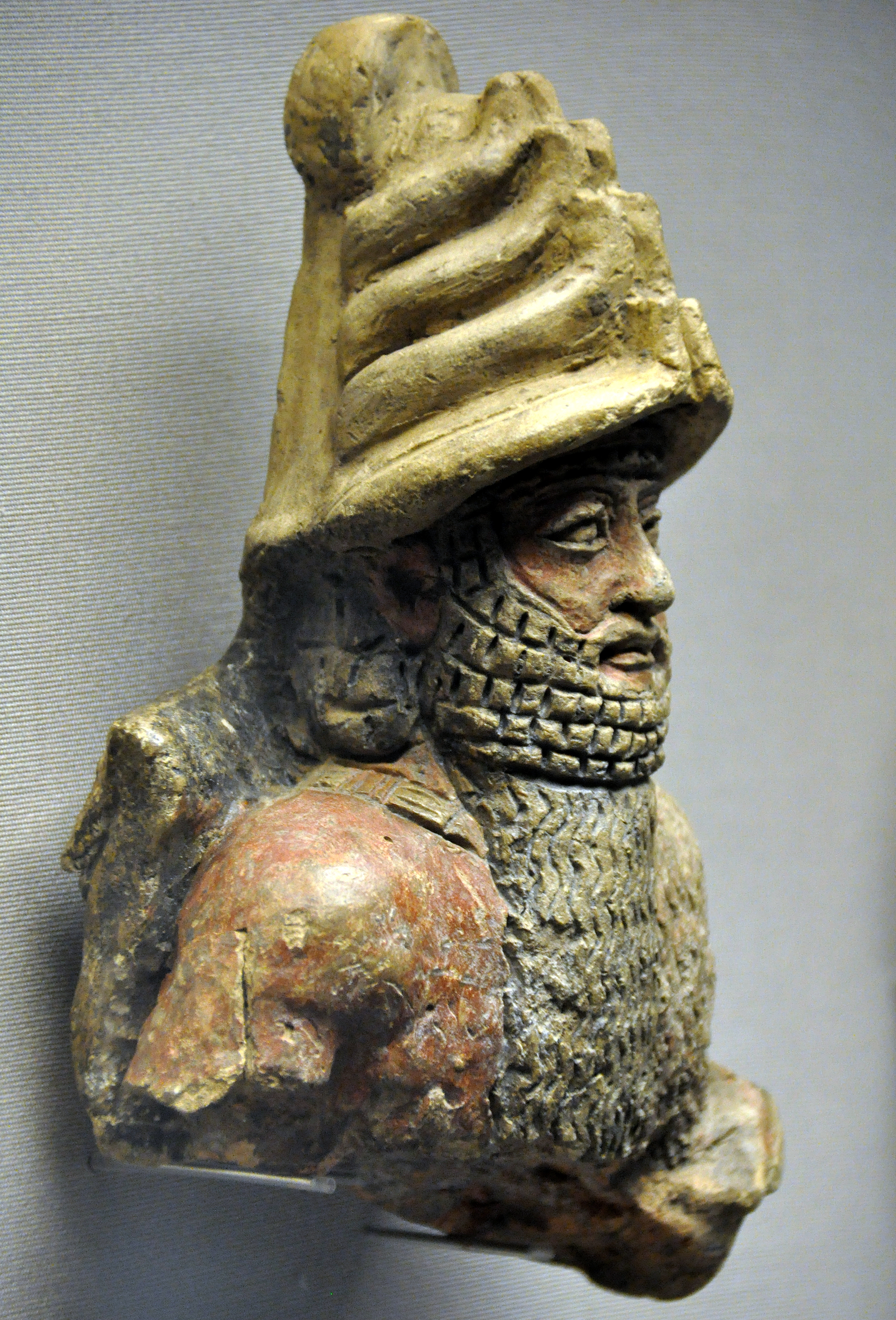
Fired clay statue of a seated god, probably Shamash. From Ur, Iraq. Old-Babylonian period, 2000-1750 BCE. British Museum

Whether referred to as Utu or Shamash, the sun god had identical iconography. Due to distinct attributes, he is considered one of the few Mesopotamian deities who can be identified in art with certainty. Depictions of him are known from many sites, for example Eshnunna, Tell al-Rimah, Sippar, Ur and Susa. His best attested attributes are a large saw (šaššaru) and rays of light emanating from his shoulders. The reasons behind associating him with the former are poorly understood, and various interpretations have been proposed, for example that it was a representation of the first ray of sunshine of the day, that it was associated with judgment, perhaps as a weapon used to behead criminals, or that the sun god used it to break through the mountains during his daily journey. Christopher Woods points out that both in Sumerian and Akkadian, judgments had to be "cut" (kud/parāsum), and therefore considers the association with judgment to be most likely. The saw's presence is often used to identify depictions of gods as Utu. He could also be depicted holding the rod-and-ring symbol, commonly associated with major deities. In some cases he is shown handing them to human rulers.

Utu was commonly depicted on cylinder seals as early as in the third millennium BCE. Multiple motifs recur on them, some not known from textual sources. On seals from the Sargonic period, he could be depicted climbing over two mountains, which has been interpreted as a representation of sunrise. He was also commonly depicted traveling in a boat. This motif is the single best attested type of cylinder seal image from the third millennium BCE, with over fifty examples presently known. Another recurring image is a depiction of Utu, sometimes accompanied by another god, partaking in a battle between deities. The attendant deity is sometimes interpreted as Bunene. In some cases Inanna is shown watching the battle or partaking in it on Utu's side. It has been suggested that it is a symbolic representation of a conflict between day and night, or that the deities confronted by Utu and his allies are rebellious mountain gods. Wilfred G. Lambert suggested that in some cases figures from battle scenes with rays emanating from their shoulders might be representations of Enmesharra rather than the sun god, as in a tradition known from a late myth, Enmesharra's Defeat, he was their original owner.

In the second millennium BCE, Utu was typically portrayed in front of worshipers, either standing or seated on a throne. One well known example of such an image is a stele of Hammurabi of Babylon, inscribed with his legal code.

Anna Kurmangaliev points out that only a single depiction of the sun god in anthropomorphic form has been identified among works of art from Babylonia from the first millennium BCE, the so-called Sun God Tablet. It is commonly discussed in scholarship, and has been described as "one of the masterpieces of ancient Near Eastern art." It was discovered by Hormuzd Rassam in December 1880 during his excavations in Abu Habbah in modern Iraq. Its discovery subsequently made it possible to identify this site with Sippar. It dates to the Neo-Babylonian period, but its style has been described as "archaizing," and most likely was inspired by motifs found in presentation scenes from the Ur III period. It shows three individuals, an intercessory minor goddess (lamma) and two men, possibly the king Nabu-apla-iddina and the priest Nabu-nadin-shumi, facing Shamash. While other anthropomorphic depictions of the sun god are known from Assyria from the same period, in Babylonia he came to be usually portrayed in the form of a symbol instead.

The symbolic representation of Utu was the sun disc, typically represented as a four-pointed star with wavy lines placed between the points. It is attested as early as in the Sargonic period, and continued to be represented in art through the rest of history of ancient Mesopotamia. It is well known from kudurru (boundary stones), where it is typically depicted in the first row of symbols, next to the eight-pointed star representing Inanna (Ishtar) and the crescent representing Nanna (Sin). Additionally the symbol of a winged sun came to be associated with the sun god in Assyria in the first millennium BCE. Some depictions of it add a bird tail as well. It only arrived in Babylonia during the reign of Nabonidus.

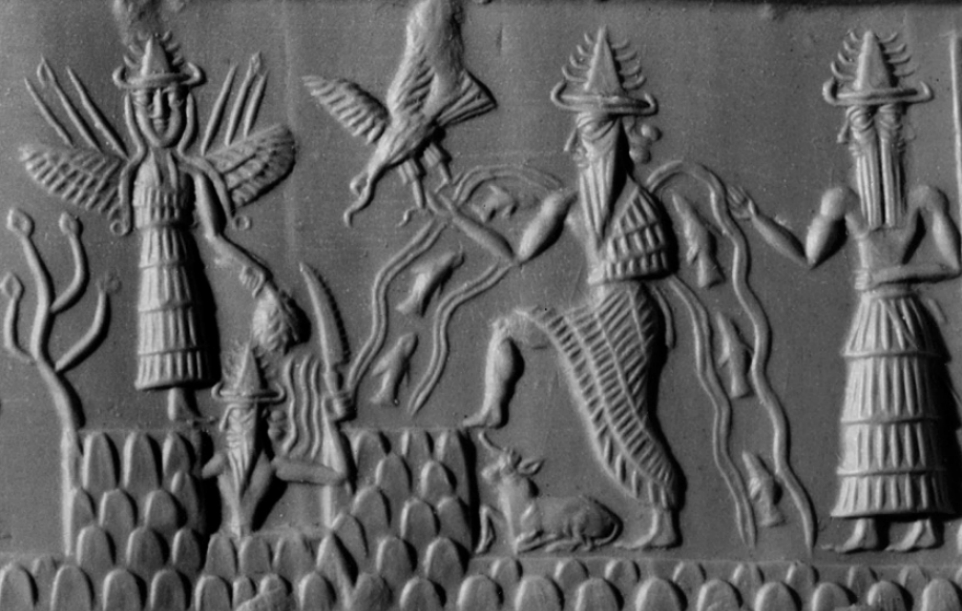
Detail of a cylinder seal from Sippar (2300 BC) depicting Shamash with rays rising from his shoulders and holding a saw-toothed knife with which he cuts his way through the mountains of the east at dawn (British Museum)

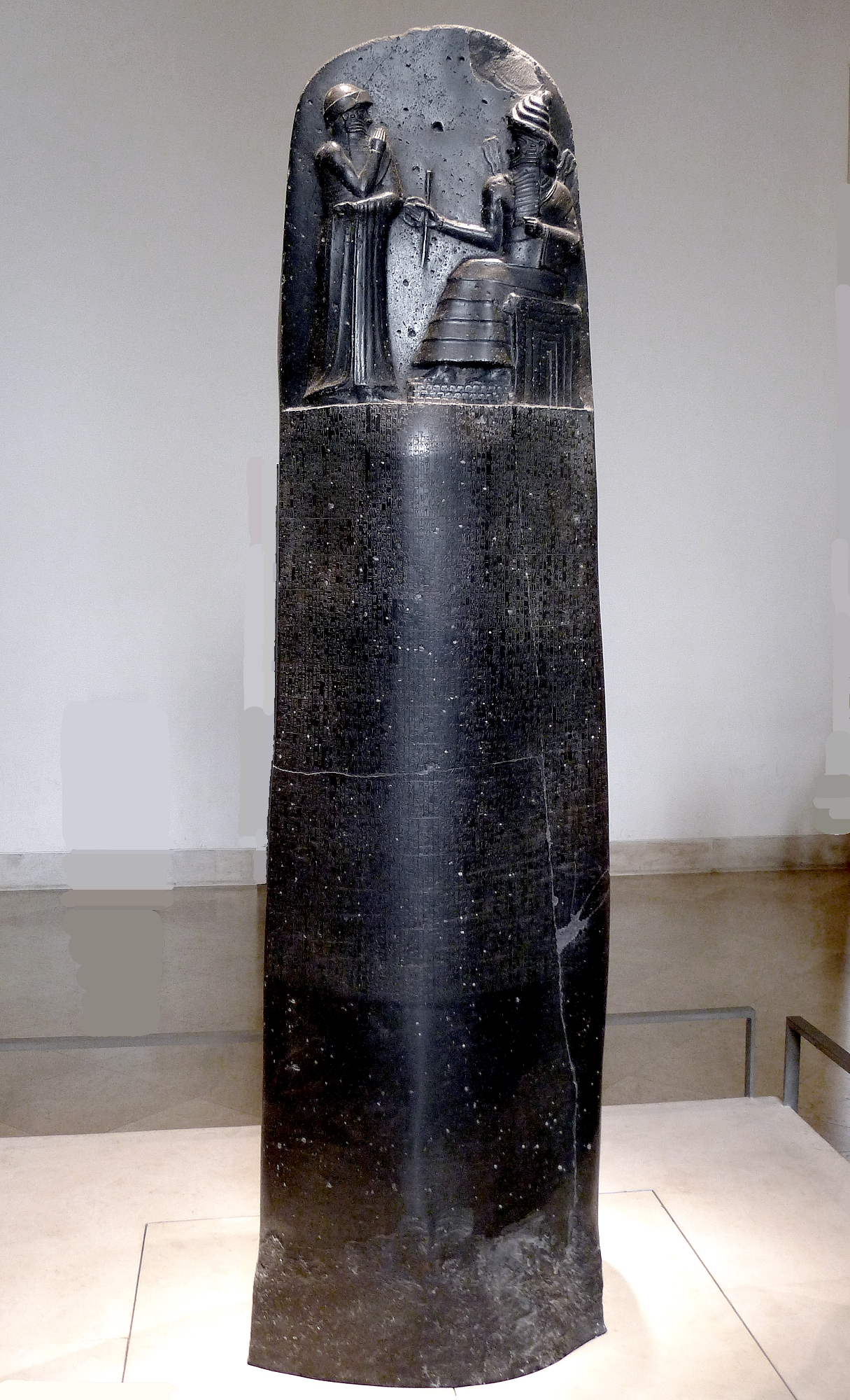
A stele of Hammurabi depicting Shamash (right)

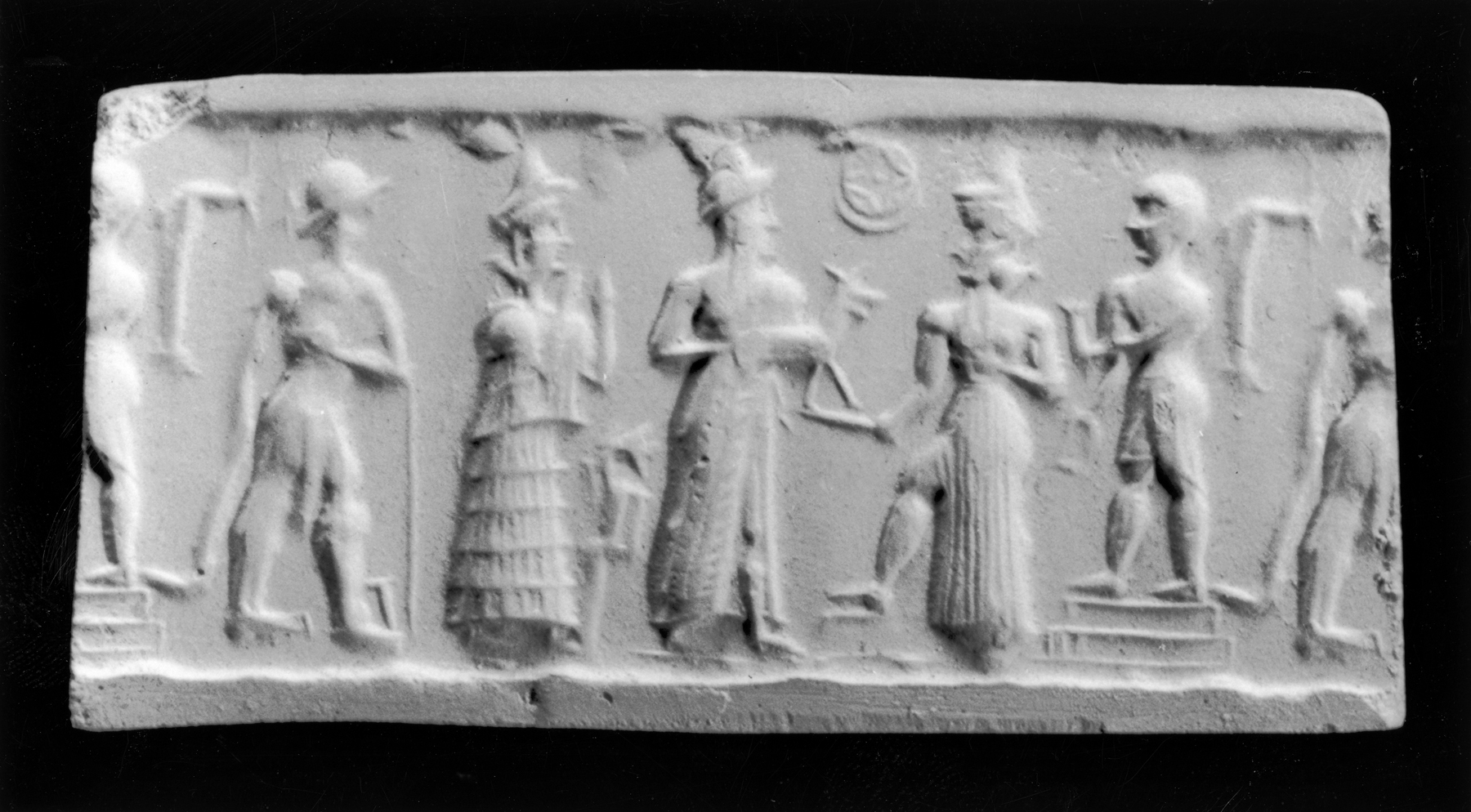
Old Babylonian cylinder seal impression depicting Shamash surrounded by worshippers (c. 1850-1598 BC)

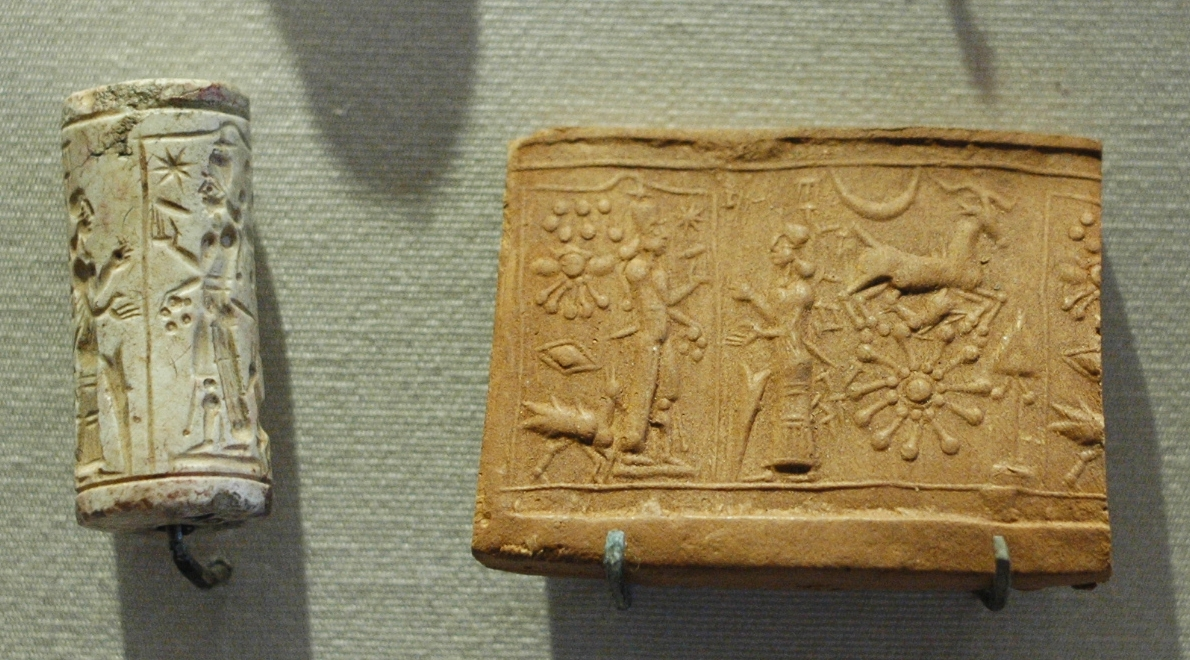
Mesopotamian limestone cylinder seal and impression showing people worshipping Shamash (Louvre)

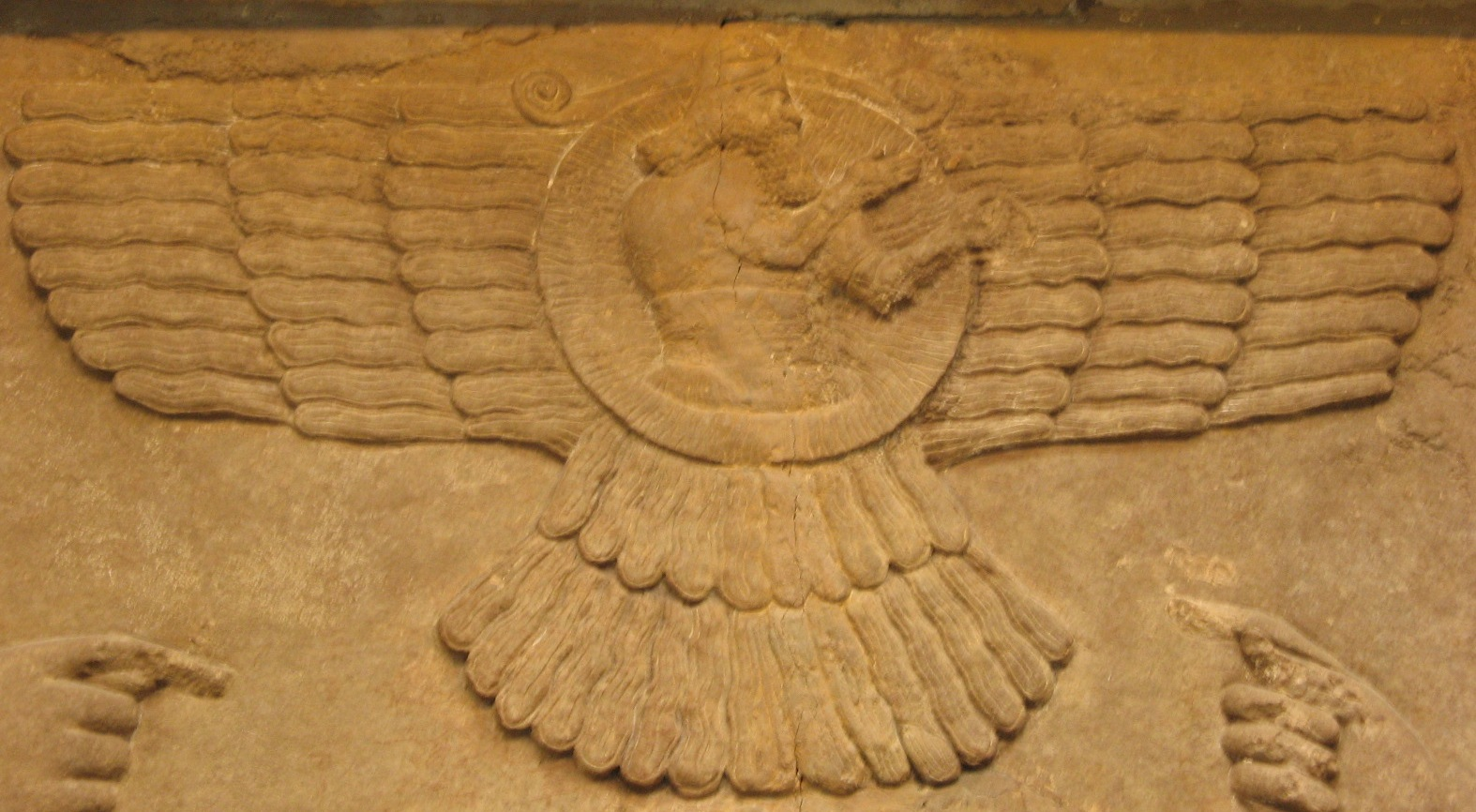
Male figure in an Assyrian winged sun emblem (Northwest Palace of Nimrud, 9th century BC).

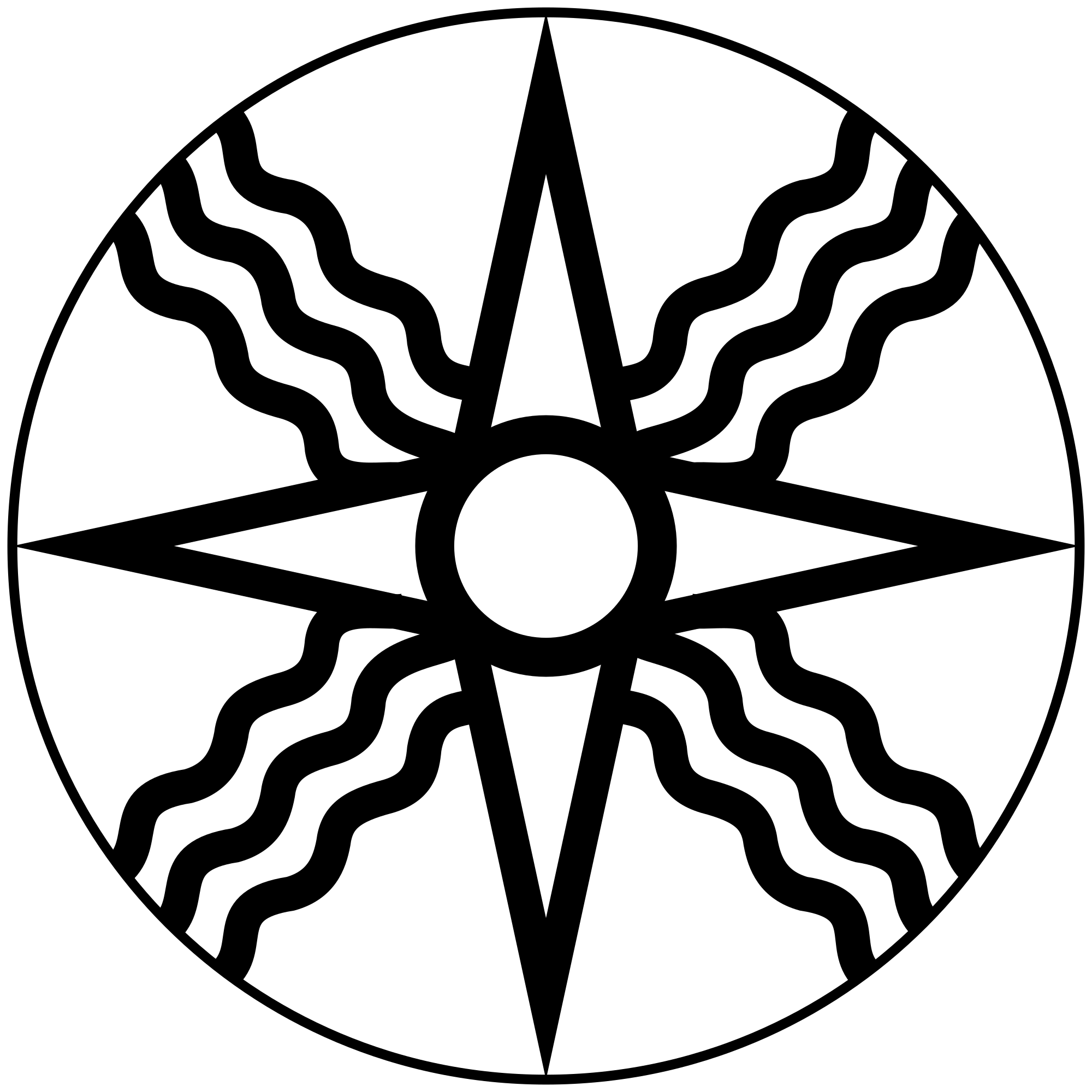
Star of Shamash

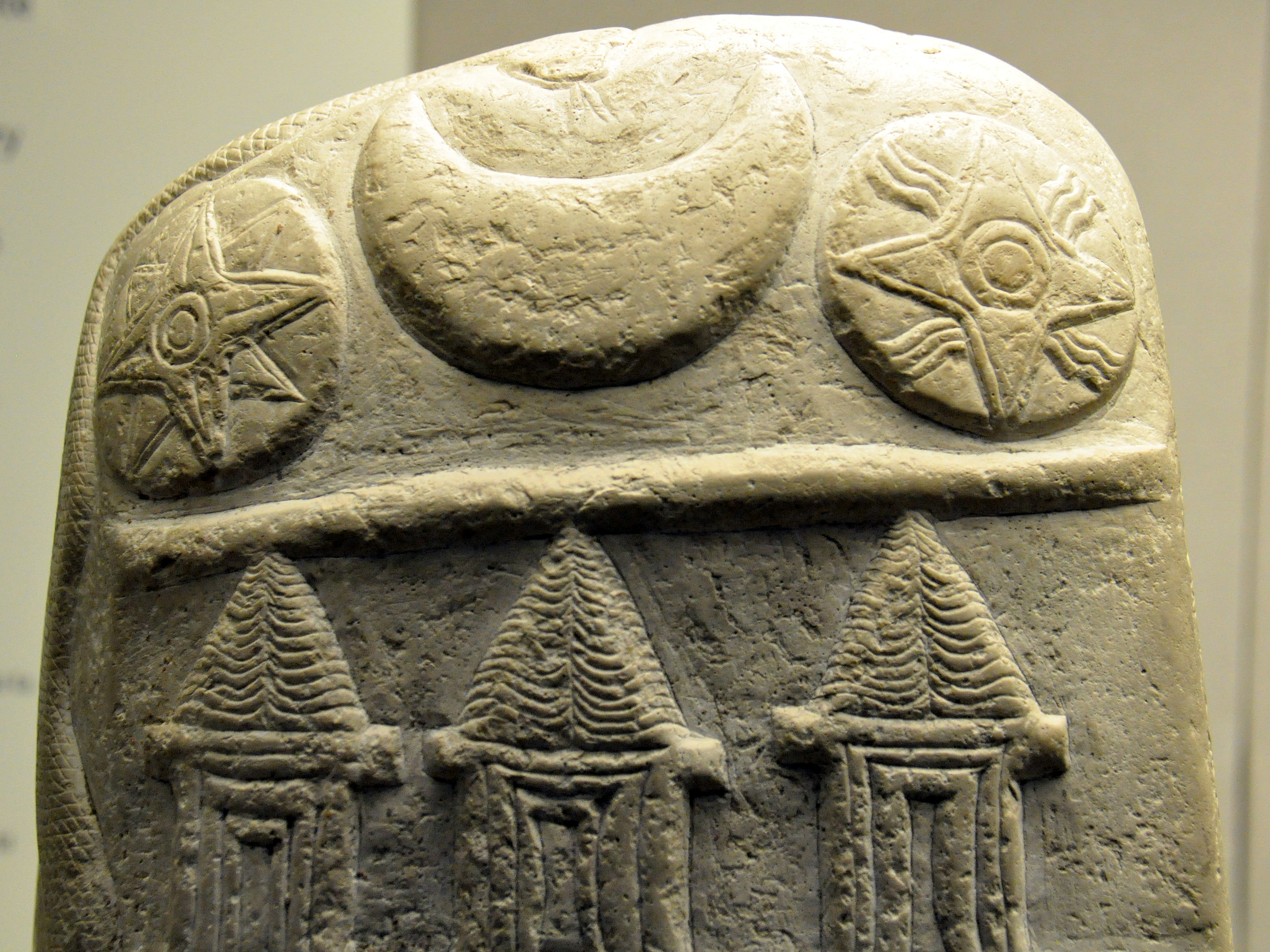
The solar symbol of Shamash (right) on a kudurru, with the star of Ishtar on the left and a crescent of Sin.

The star symbol of Shamash with wavy rays used as a symbol of the Assyrian people in the Assyrian flag.

A modern use in the emblem of Iraq 1959-1965, avoiding pan-Arab symbolism, merging the star of Shamash and the star of Ishtar.

== Associations with other deities ==
=== Family ===
The sun god was traditionally viewed as a son of the moon god in Mesopotamian religion, both in Sumerian and Akkadian texts. They are already attested as father and son in the Early Dynastic god list from Fara. The relation between them could be illustrated by matching epithets, for example in the god list An = Anum Utu is the "small boat of heaven" (Mabanda-anna), while his father Nanna - the "great boat of heaven" (Magula-anna). Ningal was regarded as Utu's mother, and Inanna as his sister. Hymn to the Queen of Nippur refers to them as twins. Due to her identification with Ishtar (Inanna) the Hurrian and Elamite goddess Pinikir is referred to as a twin sister of Shamash and daughter of Sin (Nanna) and Ningal in a text written in Akkadian but found in a corpus of Hurro-Hittite rituals. In a single Maqlû incantation, the rainbow goddess Manzat is referred to as Shamash's sister and as a daughter of Sin and Ningal.

The sun god's wife was invariably the goddess of dawn and light, usually known under the name Aya, though the forms Ninkar, Sudaĝ, Sherida and Sudgan are also well attested. Typically they were worshiped together, though sometimes Shamash shared his temples with other gods instead. Utu/Shamash and Aya are the single most common divine couple in cylinder seal inscriptions from Sippar, with only the number of dedications to Ishkur and Shala being comparably high. Aya was believed to intercede with her husband on behalf of worshipers, which is a function also well attested for other divine spouses, such as Ninmug and Shala. It has also been pointed out that in the case of Inanna, her sukkal Ninshubur fulfilled a similar role. In legal texts from Sippar, the sun god and his wife commonly appear as divine witnesses. The only other divine couple attested in this role in this city are Mamu and Bunene. Buduhudug, a mythical mountain where the sun was believed to set, was regarded as "the entrance of Shamash to Aya" (nēreb ^{d}Šamaš <ana> ^{d}Aya), the place where they were able to reunite each day after he finished his journey through the sky.

The deities counted among Utu's children include the dream goddess Mamu (as well as two other, male, dream deities, Sisig and Zagar), Šumugan, a god associated with animals, Niggina (Kittum), the deified concept of truth, according to Jacob Klein regarded as his principal daughter, and Ishum.

In myths both about himself and about Lugalbanda, the legendary king Enmerkar was referred to as a son of Utu. However, in the Sumerian King List Utu is instead his grandfather, and his father is a human ruler, Meškiağašer. Unlike other legendary kings of Uruk, namely Lugalbanda and Gilgamesh, Enmerkar was not deified, despite the existence of a tradition attributing divine ancestry to him. In various sources, Utu seems to serve as a special protector to several of Uruk's other kings.

^{d}AMAR.UD, an early writing of Marduk's name, can be translated as "bull calf of Utu," as long as it is assumed that the sign UD should be understood as a writing of Utu's name without the divine determinative (a cuneiform sign preceding names of deities), which is also attested in some theophoric names from the Early Dynastic period. However, no evidence exists that Marduk was ever viewed as a member of the family of any sun deity in Sippar, Larsa or any other location in Mesopotamia, which lead Wilfred G. Lambert to suggest this etymology is not plausible on theological grounds.

=== Court ===
Multiple deities who could be regarded as the sukkal (attendant deity) of Utu are known, and more than one could appear in this role at a time. Bunene, also known under the name Papnunna, was considered his chariot driver. Frans Wiggermann notes that his name and character (as well as these of other well attested sukkals of major city gods: Ninshubur, Alammush, Nuska and Isimud) do not appear to show direct connection with these of his master, which means that he cannot be considered the personification of the effect of the corresponding major deity's actions (unlike such deities as Nabium, deified flame and sukkal of the fire god Girra or Nimgir, deified lightning and sukkal of the weather god Ishkur) or a divine personifications of specific commands (unlike such deities as Eturammi, "do not slacken," the sukkal of Birtum). Ninpirig was referred to as Utu's sukkalmah ("great sukkal"). It has been proposed that his name might hint at a connection with light. He is attested in multiple theophoric names, chiefly from Sippar. Some researchers, including Antoine Cavigneaux and Manfred Krebernik, consider the reading of the second element of his name to be uncertain due to variable orthography, and transcribe it as Nin-PIRIG. The pair Nigzida and Nigsisa, whose names mean "law" and "order," respectively, are identified as the "vizier of the left" and "vizier of the right" in the god list An = Anum. Nigsisa alone is mentioned by Ninsun as Shamash's sukkal in the Epic of Gilgamesh. Nigzida could be equated with Niggina, another goddess regarded as the sun god's sukkal, though the latter deity's role varies between that of a servant and oldest daughter in known copies of the god list An = Anum. Her Akkadian counterpart was Kittum, whose name has the same meaning, "truth." In An = Anum Kittum is instead male and a brother of Niggina. She had a sukkal of her own, Iqbi-damiq.

None of Utu's sukkals known from other sources are present in documents from the archive of the First Sealand dynasty. Odette Boivin proposes that in local tradition, this role was instead fulfilled by the deities Lugal-namtarra and ^{d}SUKKAL, who frequently appear alongside the sun god, and that the former functioned as his sukkal during his nightly journey through the underworld, while the latter fulfilled the same role during the day. Lugal-namtarra is otherwise sparsely attested and might be analogous to Namtar. Boivin speculates that ^{d}SUKKAL developed from the male version of Ninshubur, and assumes it is plausible a connection between the latter and the sun god developed during the reign of Rim-Sîn I, a king of Larsa well known for his devotion to Ninshubur.

Many deities belonging to the court of Utu were regarded as divine judges. They could be grouped together, and collective labels such as "Eleven Standing Gods of Ebabbar" or "Six Judges of Shamash" are known from various sources. One well known example of such a deity is Ishmekarab, who could also be associated with Inshushinak and Lagamal.

Kusarikku (bull-men, or, as argued by Frans Wiggermann, bison-men) were frequently associated with Utu, and especially through the second millennium BCE were commonly depicted as members of his court, for example as standard bearers. Similarly, the human-headed bull (alima) could accompany the solar disc in art, and a reference to its head serving as an emblem of Utu is known. It is possible that the association between bison-like mythical beings and the sun god was based on their shared connection to eastern mountains. A further type of apotropaic creature associated with Utu was the girtablullu ("scorpion man"). In the Standard Babylonian Epic of Gilgamesh, a scorpion man and a scorpion woman guard the mountain of sunrise.

According to Christopher Woods, it is possible that in a single case the minor serpentine god Nirah is attested as a member of the court of Shamash. He proposes that it was a result of the well attested association between the sun god and Ishtaran, whose servant Nirah usually was.

=== Foreign deities ===
The name of the Eblaite sun deity was represented with the logogram ^{d}UTU. Manfred Krebernik assumes that it should be read as Shamash, that the deity was male, and that the goddess Ninkar also attested in texts from Ebla was his spouse. Alfonso Archi instead concludes that the deity was primarily female based on lexical evidence, but points out that the Eblaites were definitely aware of the male eastern sun god, and seemingly adopted him into their pantheon as a secondary hypostasis. Occasionally the sun deity's gender had to be indicated directly, and both ^{d}UTU-munus (female) and ^{d}UTU-nita (male) are attested. Joan Goodnick Westenholz proposed that Ninkar in Eblaite texts should be interpreted as Ninkarrak rather than the phonetically similar but more obscure Mesopotamian Ninkar. Occasional shortening of Ninkarrak's name to "Ninkar" is known from Mesopotamian sources as well. This theory is also accepted by Archi, who notes it makes the widespread worship of Ninkar easier to explain.

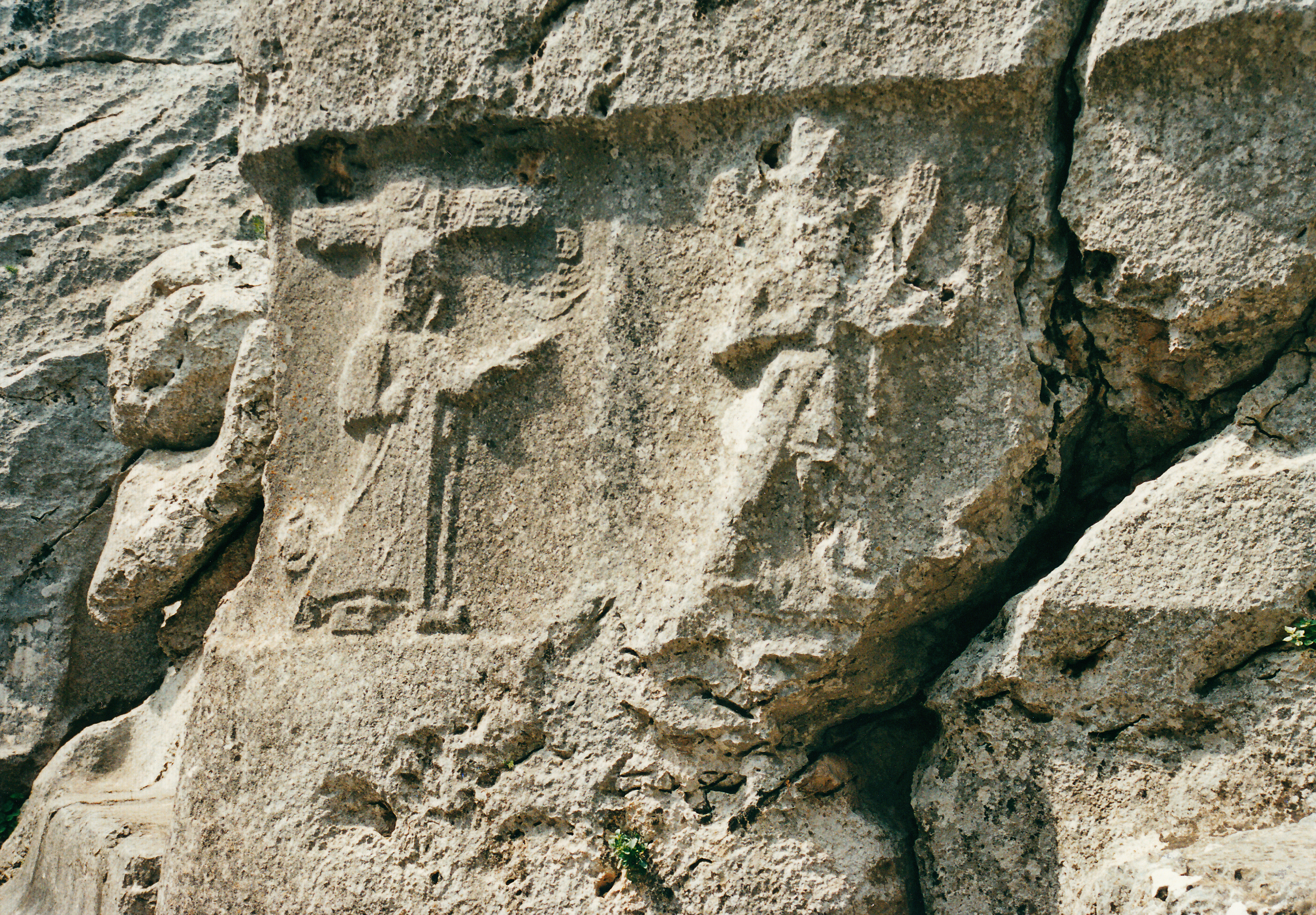
A relief of the Hurrian sun god Shimige (left) in Yazılıkaya.

The Hurrian sun god, Shimige, is already represented by the logogram ^{d}UTU in an inscription of Atalshen, an early king of Urkesh. It is the oldest known reference to him. He is directly equated with Utu in the trilingual Sumero-Hurro-Ugaritic version of the Weidner god list from Ugarit. It has been argued that his character was influenced at least in part by his Mesopotamian counterpart. Gary Beckman goes as far as suggesting that at least in Hittite texts, he "cannot (yet?) be distinguished sufficiently" from the latter. Due to this association, Aya was regarded as his spouse in Hurrian tradition, as attested in sources from Hattusa and Ugarit. In the trilingual god list, Bunene (transcribed as ^{d}wu-u-un-ni-nu-wa-an) appears in association with Shimige. Shimige is additionally equated with Lugalbanda in it, most likely because the Hurrian pantheon was smaller than that enumerated in Mesopotamian lists, creating the need to have a single Hurrian deity correspond to multiple Mesopotamian ones. The same list also attests the equivalence between Utu, Shimige and the Ugaritic sun goddess Šapšu. Apparently to avoid the implications that Shapash had a wife, the scribes interpreted the name of Aya, present in the Sumerian original, as an unconventional writing of Ea. Instead of the Hurrian spelling of Aya, the name Eyan corresponds to him in the Hurrian column and Ugaritic one lists the local craftsman god Kothar-wa-Khasis.

The logogram ^{d}UTU is well attested in Hittite texts. In addition to Utu himself and his Akkadian counterpart, the deities represented by it were the Sun goddess of Arinna (^{d}UTU ^{uru}Arinna), the Sun goddess of the Earth (taknaš ^{d}UTU), the male Sun god of Heaven (nepišaš ^{d}UTU, ^{d}UTU AN^{E}, ^{d}UTU ŠAME), as well as Luwian Tiwat, Palaic Tiyaz and Hurrian Shimige. Gary Beckman notes that the Hittite conception of solar deities does not show any Indo-European influence, and instead was largely similar to that known from Mesopotamia. He points out even the fact that the Sun god of Heaven was believed to travel in a quadriga drawn by horses, similar to Greek Helios, is not necessarily an example of the former, as deities traveling in chariots are already depicted on Mesopotamian seals from the Sargonic period.

The logogram ^{d}UTU also designated the sun deity or deities in Emar in the late Bronze Age. According to Gary Beckman, the Mesopotamian, West Semitic, Hurrian and Hittite sun deities might all be potentially represented by it in texts from this city. Eduardo Torrecilla notes in a more recent publication that the logogram commonly designates Shamash in the middle Euphrates area, and syllabic writings of his name are uncommon there, though he also states that Shimige cannot be ruled out as a possible reading in some cases.

In texts from Susa, Haft Tepe and Malamir in Elam the name of the sun god was usually written logographically as ^{d}UTU and it is uncertain when it refers to the Mesopotamian deity, and when to local Nahhunte. It is possible that in legal texts, when ^{d}UTU occurs next to Elamite deities Inshushinak, Ruhurater or Simut, the latter option is correct. While the god list An=Anum does mention Nahhunte, he is not explicitly labeled as a counterpart of Utu, and only appears as a member of a group called the "Divine Seven of Elam," associated with the goddess Narundi. A Mesopotamian commentary on a birth incantation erroneously identifies him as a moon god and Narundi as a sun deity, explaining their names as, respectively, Sin and Shamash.

== Worship ==
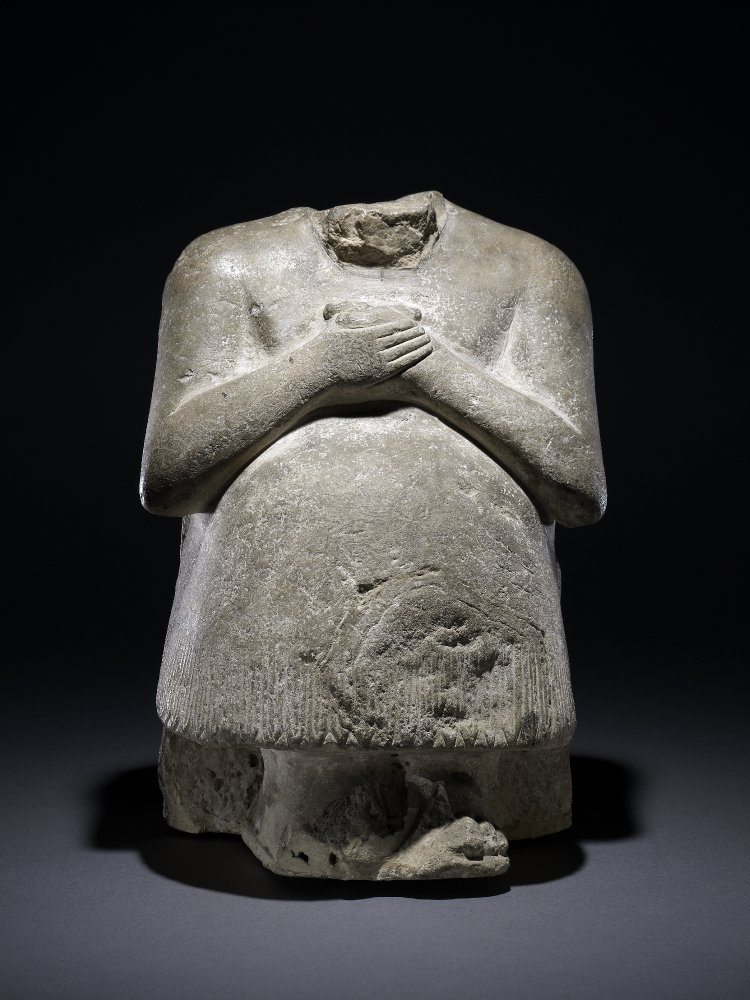
Votive figure of Ikun-Shamash from Sippar. British Museum.

The main cult centers of the sun god were Larsa and Sippar, specifically Sippar-Ahrurum (Abu Habbah). The latter city was regarded as older in Mesopotamian tradition, and in lists of temples tends to be mentioned before Larsa. In both cities, the main temple dedicated to Utu and his spouse Aya was known as Ebabbar. Less important temples dedicated to him, located in Girsu and Assur, bore the same name. It means "shining white house "in Sumerian.

The oldest attested votive objects dedicated to Utu (or Shamash) are a mace head from Ur offered by a king named Anbu or Anunbu, and a statuette from Sippar from the reign of Ikun-Shamash of Mari. Both predate the Sargonic period. Evidence for the worship of Shamash in the third millennium BCE is available from the entire Akkadian-speaking area, from Mari and western Mesopotamian cities like Sippar, through Agade, to the Diyala area.

Celebrations related to the sun god took place on the eighth, fifteenth, twentieth and possibly first day of each month.

=== Sippar ===
In the Early Dynastic period kings of Mari most likely visited the Ebabbar in Sippar to pay homage to its deity. In later periods, it was renovated by multiple rulers, including Naram-Sin of Akkad (who installed his daughter Šumšani as ēntum-priestess), Sabium of Babylon, Samsu-iluna of Babylon, who called himself "beloved of Shamash and Aya," one of the Kassite rulers bearing the name Kurigalzu (Kurigalzu I or Kurigalzu II), Ashurbanipal, Shamash-shum-ukin, Nebuchadnezzar II and Nabonidus. Many other kings are known to have patronized or visited it at some point, including Manishtushu, Apil-Sin, Hammurabi, Abi-Eshuh, Ammi-Ditana, Ammi-Saduqa, Samsu-Ditana, Simbar-shipak and Nabu-apla-iddina. In addition to Ebabbar, a ziggurat dedicated to the city's tutelary god also existed in Sippar. It was known as Ekunankuga (Siumerian: "house, pure stairway to heaven"). It was rebuilt by Samsu-iluna, Ammi-Saduqa, Neriglissar and Nabonidus. The position of Sippar and its tutelary god has been compared to that of Nippur and Enlil - while both of these gods were high-ranking members of the pantheon, and their cities were centers of religious and scholarly activity, they never constituted major political powers in their own right.

It has been suggested that the Ebabbar in Sippar served as a treasury housing particularly rare objects, as excavations of the Neo-Babylonian level of the structure revealed a number of vases from the Early Dynastic and Sargonic periods, some with signs of repair, as well as the votive statue of Ikun-Shamash, a fragment of a monolith of Manishtushu, a macehead of Shar-Kali-Sharri, a whetstone of Tukulti-Mer of Ḫana, and other objects from earlier periods of Mesopotamian history.

A special group connected to Shamash in Sippar were women referred to as nadītu. Their existence is particularly well attested in the Old Babylonian period, and it has been argued that the institution first developed around 1880 BCE, during the reign of Sumu-la-El of Babylon. Nadītu lived in a building referred to as gagûm, conventionally translated as "cloister," and Tonia Sharlach notes they can be compared to medieval Christian nuns. They are sometimes described as "priestesses" in modern literature, but while it is well attested that they were considered to be dedicated to a specific deity, there is little evidence for their involvement in religious activities other than personal prayer. It is not impossible they were understood as a fully separate social class. Family background of individual nadītu varied, though they came predominantly from the higher strata of society. While many came from families of craftsmen, scribes or military officials, a number of them were daughters or sisters of kings. Both Zimri-Lim of Mari and Hammurabi of Babylon had nadītu of Shamash among their female family members.

A ceremony called lubuštu was established in Sippar by Nabu-apla-iddina. It involved providing the statues of Shamash, Aya and Bunene with new garments at specific dates throughout the year. Records indicate it was still celebrated in the Achaemenid period, during the reign of Darius I.

=== Larsa ===
The Ebabbar in Larsa is mentioned for the first time in a text from the reign Eannatum. It was rebuilt, expanded or repaired by Ur-Nammu of Ur, Zabaya, Sin-Iddinam, Hammurabi, one of the two rulers bearing the name Kadashman-Enlil (Kadashman-Enlil I or Kadashman-Enlil II), Burnaburiash I, Nebuchadnezzar II and Nabonidus. Other rulers who have patronized it at some point include Gungunum, Abisare, Sumuel, Nur-Adad, Sin-Iqisham, Kudur-Mabuk, Warad-Sin and Rim-Sîn I.

Odette Boivin notes that the deities of Larsa were apparently well represented in the pantheon of the First Sealand dynasty. She suggests that those kings might have associated their position both with Larsa and with its tutelary god.

The Larsean form of the sun god was also worshiped in Uruk and a close connection between these two cities is well documented. At an unknown point in time after Larsa's loss of status, possibly in the Kassite period, Uruk most likely gained influence over it, and in the Neo-Babylonian period, the Ebabbar was functionally a subordinate temple of Eanna. Multiple letters attest that the latter was responsible for providing commodities required for the performance of various rites in the former, for example sacrificial animals or wool for garments of divine statues of Shamash and Belet Larsa ("Lady of Larsa," most likely a title of Aya). Craftsmen employed by the Eanna were also responsible for repairing the paraphernalia of the deities of Ebabbar. Such a situation is otherwise unknown, as each temple usually maintained its own workshop. A treasury of Shamash and Aya, distinct from that of the Eanna, is nonetheless attested. Ebabbar most likely remained under control of the temple administration from Uruk in the Hellenistic period, though known names of the city's inhabitants from this period are predominantly Greek, rather than Mesopotamian.

=== Other cities ===
Utu was among the deities worshiped in the territory of Lagash in the Early Dynastic period. A dais dedicated to him existed in Namnuda-kigarra. It was originally erected by Eannatum, then destroyed by Ur-Lumma of Umma, and finally rebuilt by Entemena. It is possible that these events took place during a border conflict between Umma and Lagash. Theophoric names invoking Utu are well attested in texts from this area. Examples include Shubur-Utu, Utu-amu and Utu-kiag.

A temple of Utu, Ehili ("house of luxuriance") also existed in Ur. It was rebuilt by Enannatumma, the daughter of Ishme-Dagan, whose inscriptions refer to it as the god's "pure storeroom." A town located near this city, most likely somewhere between it and Larsa, bore the name Kar-Shamash, KAR.^{d}UTU^{ki}. Most likely a temple dedicated to the eponymous god existed there as well.

In Babylon, Shamash was worshiped in the temple Edikukalamma ("house of the judge of the land"), first attested in the Old Babylonian period and still mentioned in inscriptions from the reign of Nebuchadnezzar II. He was also one of the many gods worshiped in the Esagil temple complex, where his seat was the E-ešbaranki ("house of decisions of heaven and the underworld"). A socle dedicated to him called Edikugal ("house of the great judge") was also present in Erabriri, most likely the temple bearing this name located in Babylon which was dedicated to Mandanu.

In Assur, a temple of Shamash was refounded by king Arik-den-ili, though as no name is given in sources mentioning this event it is uncertain if it was identical with Ebabbar of Assur mentioned in a later topographical text. Additionally, Ehulhuldirdirra ("house of surpassing joys"), while primarily dedicated to Sin, was also associated with Shamash, as attested in building inscriptions of Ashur-nirari I, Tukulti-Ninurta I and Ashurnasirpal II.

A sanctuary in Nippur known in Akkadian as bīt dalīli, "house of fame," was jointly dedicated to Nisaba, Kusu, Ningal, Shamash and Bēl-āliya.

In the Old Babylonian period, Shamash was worshiped in Susa in Elam, where the local pantheon consisted out of both Elamite deities, such as Inshushinak and Simut, and Mesopotamian ones. He appears in oath formulas and theophoric names.

In Mari, Shamash was worshiped in a temple named Egirzalanki ("house of the joy of heaven and the underworld"), built by Yahdun-Lim.

An inscription of Nebuchadnezzar II might indicate that the sun god's manifestation from Larsa was also worshiped in Ekarra ("house of the quay"), a temple located in Dilmun, on the Failaka Island, which was dedicated to the local deities Inzak and Meskilak.

The Canonical Temple List, which dates to the Kassite period, mentions further temples, whose location is left unspecified: Eantasurra ("house which twinkles from heaven;" not to be confused with an identically named temple of Ningirsu built by Akurgal somewhere near Girsu), Ekukina ("pure house, bechamber"), Enamtarkalamma ("house of the destinies of the land") and Enugalanna (reading and translation uncertain, possibly "house of the great light of heaven").

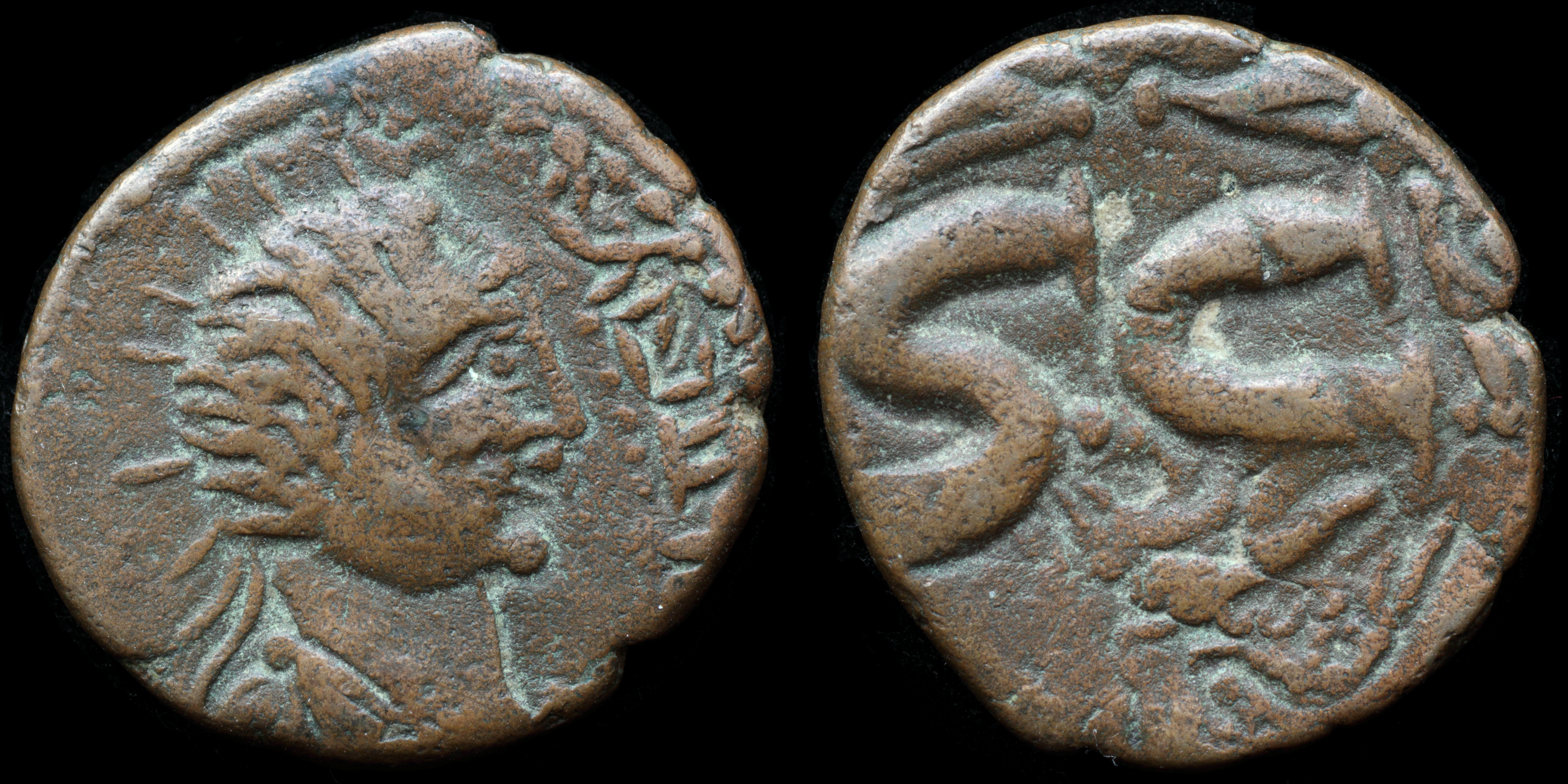
Shamash depicted on bronze coin struck in Hatra (c. 117-138 AD)

In the Parthian period, Hatra came to be seen as a cult center of the sun god, and according to Manfred Krebernik its importance can be compared to Sippar and Larsa in earlier times.

== Mythology ==
Manfred Krebernik notes that while no myths focused primarily on the sun god were known as of 2011, he appears in a supporting role in many well known compositions. Commonly other figures appeal to him, especially when faced with problems connected with locations far away from urban centers, such as steppes or mountains.

In multiple accounts of Dumuzi's death, he pleads with Utu to save him from the galla demons sent after him. This motif is attested in Inanna's Descent, Dumuzi's Death, and other works. In Dumuzi and Geshtinanna, Utu is specifically invoked as a judge. In all cases, the circumstances leading to it are the same: Dumuzi is already pursued, and his life is in danger. In both Dumuzi's Death and Inanna's Descent, he argues Utu should help him because he is his brother-in-law. Some copies of the latter narrative also include a couplet in which he also states that he paid respect to Utu's and Inanna's mother, Ningal. While Utu fulfills Dumuzi's request in all known myths about his death, in none of them this is enough to save him, and the most the sun god can accomplish is a delay of his death.

In the myth How Grain Came to Sumer, Ninmada advises Ninazu to ask Utu for help with bringing barley from a distant land. Since the rest of the narrative is not preserved, it is unknown in which way he helped them accomplish this goal.

In the myth Inanna and An, Utu aids his sister with bringing the Eanna temple down from heaven. It is possible that it served as a mythical explanation of the origin of Mesopotamian temples.

A myth involving the sun god and other deities is known from Ebla. It might have been imported from Kish, and the language it was written in has been described as "an archaic Akkadian dialect." Due to many uncertainties translation and interpretation of this text are considered difficult. It has been argued that it might be a description of a meeting between Enki and Utu during the latter's journey through the Abzu.

Shamash is mentioned in a myth which deals with the origin of the god Ishum, which is only known from a single fragment from the Old Babylonian period. Ishum is described as a son of Ninlil and the sun god who was abandoned in the streets. It is assumed that this story represents a relic of the association between the goddess Sud, who came to be identified with Ninlil, and Sudaĝ, one of the names of the wife of Utu. Ishum was usually regarded as the son of this couple instead. Manfred Krebernik considers the composition to be the result of confusion between the names Sud and Sudaĝ, and thus between Ninlil and Ishum's mother, rather than syncretism.

In the myth Enmesharra's Defeat, which is only known from a single poorly preserved copy from either the Seleucid or Parthian period, Shamash's radiance was bestowed upon him by Marduk after the imprisonment of the eponymous being, who was its original owner. The term used to describe it is zīmû (zi-mu-ú), which can refer to a halo and possibly to the rays of the sun. Wilfred G. Lambert assumed that this scene might be an echo of some of the depictions of fights between gods from Sargonic cylinder seals.

=== Gilgamesh myths ===
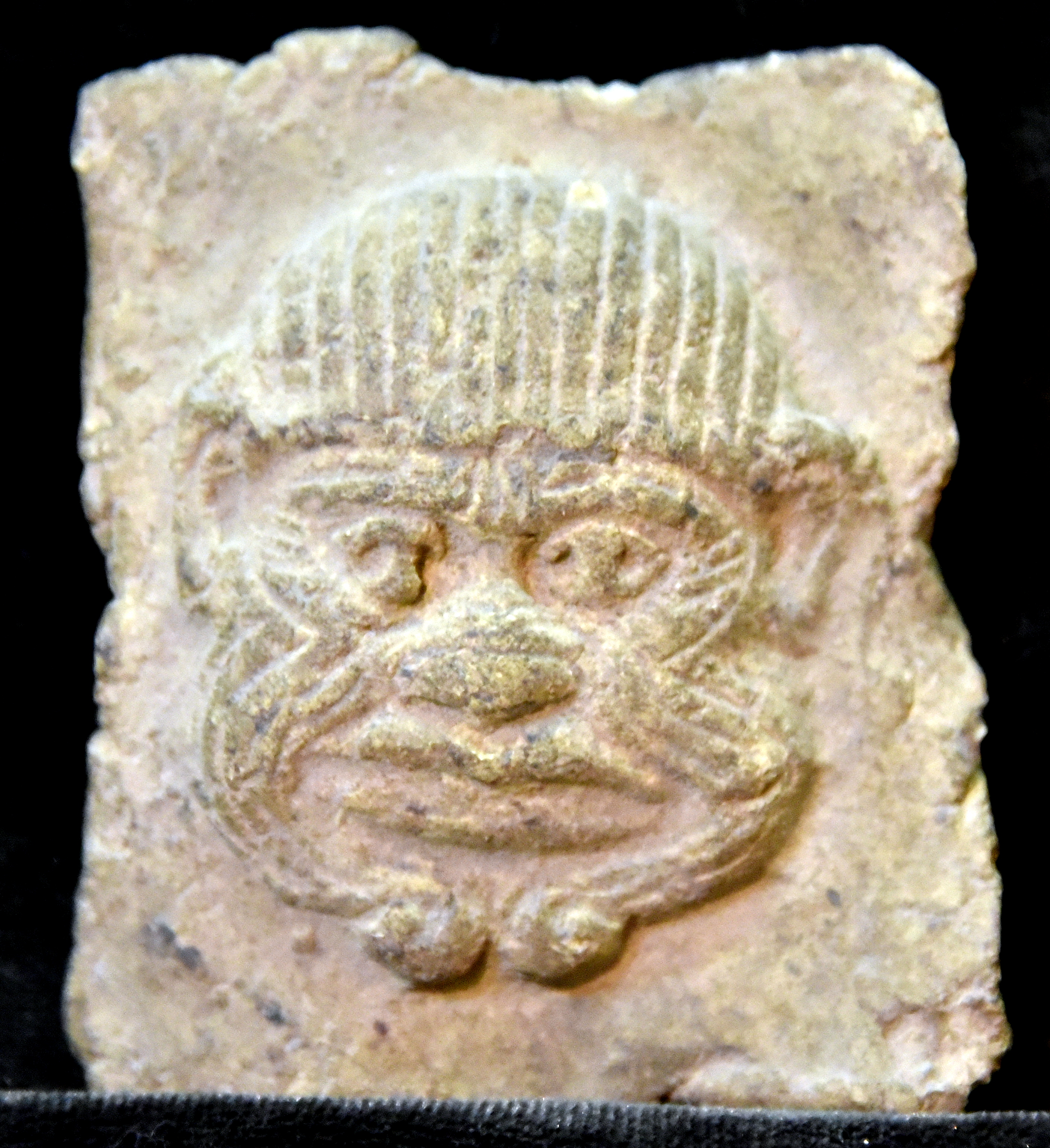
A depiction of Humbaba. Sulaymaniyah Museum.

In the Sumerian myth Gilgamesh and Humbaba, Enkidu tells Gilgamesh that he should ask Utu for permission before they embark on the journey to Humbaba's dwelling. After learning that Gilgamesh wants to acquire fame because he knows he will not live forever, Utu grants him seven constellations (described as zoomorphic creatures) meant to guide him to his destination safely. Humbaba later tries pleading with Utu when he is about to die, but his prayer is unsuccessful. It is possible that in a slightly divergent version of the myth he was spared, though this remains uncertain as its ending is not preserved.

In another early Gilgamesh narrative, Gilgamesh, Enkidu and the Netherworld, Utu is first referenced by Inanna, who asks Gilgamesh to help her with getting rid of creatures infesting a tree she planted on the bank of the Euphrates. She states that Utu refused to intervene. The reasoning behind his decision is not explained. Later, when Enkidu is confined in the underworld, Gilgamesh petitions Enki for help. The latter tells Utu to bring Enkidu's shade with him when he rises, which lets the heroes temporarily reunite. A retelling of this episode is also known from the final tablet of the "Standard Babylonian" Epic of Gilgamesh, which has no direct connection to the rest of this version of the story. An old erroneous view was that the god acting on Ea's (Enki's) command in this version is Nergal rather than Shamash.

In the Old Babylonian version of the Epic of Gilgamesh, Gilgamesh prays to Shamash after deciding to venture to the Cedar Forest to vanquish Humbaba. Later the elders of Uruk tell him to dig wells to be able to make libations to the sun god and Lugalbanda (in this version functioning as his personal god) while traveling westwards. On the way, shortly before reaching the land of Ebla, Gilgamesh has a dream which Enkidu interprets as a sign that Shamash (or, in a variant from Tell Harmal, Shamash and Lugalbanda) views his efforts favorably. It is possible that in one of the variants of the Old Babylonian version, only known from Tell Harmal, Humbaba says that he was informed by Shamash in a dream that he will be vanquished, though the state of preservation of the tablet makes it impossible to determine this with certainty. According to a tablet presumed to originate in Sippar, Gilgamesh later encounters Shamash while wandering in the steppe mourning Enkidu's death. The sun god warns him about the futility of the quest for eternal life. This passage is not present in any later versions, but Shamash's advice closely parallels another unique scene from the same version, namely the advice given by the anonymous alewife who corresponds to Šiduri from the Standard Babylonian version.

In the Standard Babylonian version of the Epic of Gilgamesh Shamash is portrayed as Gilgamesh's divine patron. He is still invoked to protect him on the way to Humbaba's forest, but the hero does not pray to him on his own. Instead his mother, the goddess Ninsun, invokes the sun god on the roof of her own temple. She blames Shamash for Gilgamesh's desire to venture into distant lands, and asks his wife Aya to intercede on her son's behalf to guarantee his safety. During the confrontation with Humbaba, Shamash intervenes by sending thirteen winds to incapacitate the monster, which lets Gilgamesh strike the decisive blow. Andrew R. George notes that since this version describes Humbaba as mimma lemnu, a term which can be translated as "everything evil" or "an evil thing," often found in exorcistic literature where it refers to hostile forces, it is natural for Shamash, who was the god of justice, to oppose him. In an earlier interpretation, Jeffrey Tigay argued that Shamash outright becomes the instigator of the quest, which according to him was the "final and logical development of his role." However, according to George Shamash's participation in the slaying of Humbaba is the realization of the requests from Ninsun's prayer. In the same version of the composition, after the defeat of the Bull of Heaven Gilgamesh and Enkidu offer the animal's heart to Shamash, which might be a reference to a custom also mentioned in one of the myths about Lugalbanda, in which he offers the heart of a mundane wild bull to Utu after a successful hunt. After celebrations of their victory, Enkidu has a dream vision of an argument between gods during which Shamash protests Enlil's decision that one of the heroes has to die as punishment for the slaying of Humbaba and the Bull of Heaven. After waking up he laments that they dedicated a door made from the cedar wood from Humbaba's forest to Enlil rather than Shamash.

In the flood myth which became part of the standard version of the Epic of Gilgamesh, Shamash is responsible for announcing the beginning of the flood when he rises in the morning, which according to Nathan Wasserman represents a relatively young tradition, as in most of the other versions the cataclysm starts in the middle of the night. He suggests that most likely the compiler of the text found this to be suitable given the sun god's role as humanity's helper through the story.

== See also ==
- Solar myths
