= Mamu (deity) =

Mesopotamian deity of dreams

- Deity of dreams
- Major cult centre: Sippar

Genealogy
- Parents: Shamash and Aya
- Siblings: Kittum/Niggina and Sisig
- Consort: Bunene

Mamu (𒀭𒈠𒊬; also romanized as Mamud) was a Mesopotamian goddess associated with dreams. She was regarded as the daughter of the sun god Shamash (Utu) and could herself be called the "Utu of dreams". References to male Mamu are also known, though it has been proposed that they only represent a late change of gender attested for a number of other originally female deities as well.

== Character ==
Mamu's name is derived from the word mamu, which means "dream" in Sumerian. As noted by Annette Zgoll, Sumerian has two words with that meaning which are not fully interchangeable. While the word mašĝi could designate any type of dream, mamu was specifically a meaningful dream, which was regarded as capable of influencing the future. The Assur Dream Ritual Compendium describes Mamu as dingir mamuda, "deity of dreams." In Mesopotamian religion, dream deities could act as messengers of other gods, and as such were believed to manifest in dreams to convey information, including visions of the future.

Wilfred G. Lambert argued that Mamu's gender in sources such as the god list An = Anum, where she is directly described as dumu.munus, "daughter," was most likely influenced by the feminine grammatical gender of the Akkadian translation of her name, šuttu. References to male Mamu are also known. Julia M. Asher-Greve proposes that Mamu was primarily seen as a female deity, and the references to male Mamu should be treated as a late change as in the case of Ninkasi or Ninmug.

== Associations with other deities ==
Mamu's father was the sun god Utu (Shamash) whose wife was Aya. The god list An = Anum labels Mamu as the "Utu of dreams" (^{d}Utu ma-mú-da-ke_{4}). It has been suggested that the connection between the sun god and dream deities was based on his well attested role in divination. According to An = Anum, Mamu's siblings were Niggina (the personification of truth), Kittum (uncommonly treated as male and distinct from Niggina, despite usually simply being the Akkadian form of her name) and Sisig, a male dream deity. In the earlier Weidner god list, Mamu appears alongside Utu and Aya but without the relation being specified. According to Manfred Krebernik, she is linked with the deity Nin-PIRIG in this source.

Mamu's husband was Bunene, the sukkal (divine vizier) of her father.

Wilfred G. Lambert proposed that the goddess Mumudu might be one and the same as Mamu based on the similarity of their names. In the myth Enki and Ninmah, she appears as one of the seven helpers of the eponymous goddess, the other six being Ninimma, Shuzianna, Ninmada, Ninšar, Ninmug and Ninniginna. These deities do not appear together elsewhere, but in this myth they are identified as Šassūrātu, a group of assistants of Ninmah.

== Worship ==
A temple of Mamu and Bunene existed in Sippar. They received offerings together according to administrative texts from this city. For example, Iltani, daughter of Sin-Muballit, offered mirsu cakes to both of them twice in the twenty first year of Hammurabi's reign. Theophoric names invoking Mamu are attested in documents from the same city, for example Warad-Mamu and Amat-Mamu. In contracts she appears alongside Bunene as a divine witness, similarly to how Shamash and Aya appear together. No other divine couples appear in documents from that city in similar roles. Mamu also appears as a witness on her own, which is only attested for Aya and Annunitum otherwise when it comes to goddesses worshiped in Sippar. It has been proposed that a goddess depicted frontally on some seals from Sippar might be Mamu, but it is also possible that she should be identified as Aya.

A sanctuary dedicated to Mamu was built by the Assyrian king Assurnasirpal II in Imgur-Enlil (modern Balawat) next to the royal palace, but according to Wilfred G. Lambert, in this location the deity was viewed as male. Male Mamu is also attested in some Akkadian prayers.
