= Yevgeni Zakharchenko =

Russian footballer

Personal information
- Full name: Yevgeni Vasilyevich Zakharchenko
- Date of birth: 21 September 1978 (age 48)
- Place of birth: Pyatigorsk, Russian SFSR
- Height: 1.82 m (5 ft 11 1/2 in)
- Positions: Midfielder; defender

Senior career*
Years	Team	Apps	(Gls)
1996	FC Beshtau Lermontov	26	(1)
1997	FC Dynamo-d Stavropol	33	(2)
1998	FC Dynamo Stavropol	0	(0)
1999–2000	FC Spartak-Kavkaztransgaz Izobilny	23	(1)
2001–2002	FC Volga Ulyanovsk	10	(0)
2003–2009	FC Okzhetpes	147	(4)
2011	FC Kyzylzhar	26	(1)

Managerial career
- 2013–2014: FC Mashuk-KMV Pyatigorsk (administrator)
- * Club domestic league appearances and goals

Yevgeni Vasilyevich Zakharchenko (Russian: Евгений Васильевич Захарченко; born 21 September 1978) is a former Russian professional footballer.
