= Gavrah Zakar =

Gavrah Zakar گاورزكار
- Village
- Location within Iran
- Coordinates: 33°12′06″N 48°33′41″E
- Country: Iran
- Province: Lorestan
- County: Khorramabad
- Bakhsh: Papi
- Rural District: Tang-e Haft

Population (2006)
  - Total: 23
- Time zone: UTC+3:30 (IRST)
  - Summer (DST): UTC+4:30 (IRDT)

Gavrah Zakar (Persian: گاورزكار, also Romanized as Gāvrah Zaḵār) is a village in Tang-e Haft Rural District, Papi District, Khorramabad County, Lorestan Province, Iran. At the 2006 census, its population was 23, in 5 families.
