= Bunene =

Ancient Mesopotamian deity

The ancient Mesopotamian deity Bunene, inscribed in cuneiform sumerograms as ^{d}ḪAR and phonetically as ^{d}bu-ne-ne, was a subordinate to and sukkal ("vizier") or charioteer of the sun-god Šamaš, whom he drove from the eastern horizon at dawn to the doorway of the interior of heaven in the west at dusk in a daily ritual. Like his overlord Šamaš, Bunene had a sanctuary, the é.kur.ra, or "House of the Mountain", at Sippar, modern Abu Habbah which was rebuilt by Nabonidus, the last king of the Neo-Babylonian Empire and he also featured in the pantheons at Uruk and Larsa, where his patron was also venerated.

== History ==
Bunene seems to have originated as a minor solar deity before he was absorbed as an attendant into the Šamaš cult. He first emerges in this role during the Old Babylonian period in an Akkadian prayer of a divination priest to Šamaš and in an inscription of Yahdun-Lim of Mari. The Kassite-era Land grant to Munnabittu kudurru has him following the goddess Aya in its listing of divine protectors and from the late Bronze age onward he appears as an intercessor in rituals and oracles directed at Šamaš. His cultic statue features in the donations of garments and food given to Šamaš in the Sun God Tablet of Nabu-apla-iddina, ca. 870 BC, where he seems to have formed a holy trinity with this god and his consort Aya. His prominence in the later Neo-Babylonian period in the environs of Sippar, meant he was typically listed fifth on inventories of offerings to the shrines in Sippar, such as that of Nabopolassar and Nebuchadnezzar II.
