= Glakho Zakaryan =

Armenian singer

- Born: April 26, 1905; Tiflis, Russian Empire
- Died: February 28, 1992 (aged 86) Tbilisi, Georgia
- Genres: classical, folk
- Occupation: singer

Glakho Zakaryan (Armenian: Գլախո Զաքարյան, Georgian: გლახო ზახაროვი, April 26, 1905 – February 28, 1992) was an Armenian singer. He was an Honored Artist of the Armenian SSR (1967) and an Honored Artist of the Georgian SSR (1985).

== Biography ==
Since 1926 Glakho Zakaryan was soloist of the Georgian Philharmonic. He performed the songs of Armenian ashiks, mainly Sayat-Nova (Zakaryan's performance of the song "Dun en glkhen imastoun iss..." ("You are wise since then") is heard in the Armenian TV movie "Sayat-Nova", 1960). In 1934, as part of the "Mountain Eagles" joint multinational ensemble, he performed on tour in many cities of the USSR. In 1939, he participated in the ten-day exhibition of Georgian art and literature in Moscow, in 1943–1945, he led the group of duduk players in the Georgian Song-Dance Ensemble. He gave concerts in Yerevan, Moscow, Leningrad, Vladivostok, and Central Asian cities.

One of the streets of Tbilisi is named after Zakaryan.

== Honours ==
- Honored Artist of the Armenian SSR (1967)
- Honored Artist of the Georgian SSR (1985)
- Zakaryan was recognized as the best performer in the competition dedicated to the 250th anniversary of Sayat-Nova's birth in Yerevan.
