= Zakharchuk =

Zakharchuk is a Ukrainian gender-neutral patronymic surname. Notable people with the surname include:

- Oksana Zakharchuk (born 1980), Ukrainian shot putter
- Platon Zakharchuk (born 1972), Russian footballer and coach
- Stepan Zakharchuk (born 1986), Russian ice hockey player
