= Iškar Zaqīqu =

Akkadian compendium of oneiromancy

The Dream Book, iškar ^{d}Zaqīqu (“core text of the god Zaqīqu”), is an eleven tablet compendium of oneiromancy written in Akkadian. Tablets two to nine form the manual of deductive divination, while tablets one, ten and eleven provide rituals to alleviate bad dreams. Zaqīqu, which means "spirit" or "ghost," is a name of the dream god.

== The text ==
Dream interpretations first appear in texts from Mari, whether solicited by the incubation ritual or spontaneous. The iškar ^{d}Zaqīqu is one of the few texts to have survived in fairly complete form from the library of Ashurbanipal, and is believed to have been copied from an old Babylonian original. Visions from dreams came in three types: messages from a deity, reflections of the dreamer’s state of mind or health, and prophetic dreams. The šā’ilu “questioner” or dream diviner could be a professional drawn from any of the disciplines of Mesopotamian scholarship, the ašipu, “exorcist,” the bārû, “diviner,” ṭupšarru, “astrologer,” muhhûm, “ecstatic,” or raggimu, “prophet,” or commonly a woman, ragintu “prophetess.” Records of the library at Nineveh show inclusion of tablets from the collections of a diviner and also of an exorcist from Nippur. The similarity with the traditions of Egyptian New Kingdom dream hermeneutic oracles suggest a shared origin.

The omens take the form of – one sentence, highly formalized units – with a protasis in which the portentous event is described, and an apodosis in which the meaning or consequence is given. They make extensive use of puns to explain the symbolism of the dream, for example, “If a man dreams he is eating a raven (arbu); he will have income (irbu),” "If a man dreams he is eating human flesh (šēru); then he will have great riches (šarû)” and “If (someone) has given him miḫru-wood; he shall have no rival (māḫiru).”
