= Andrei Zakharenko =

Russian footballer

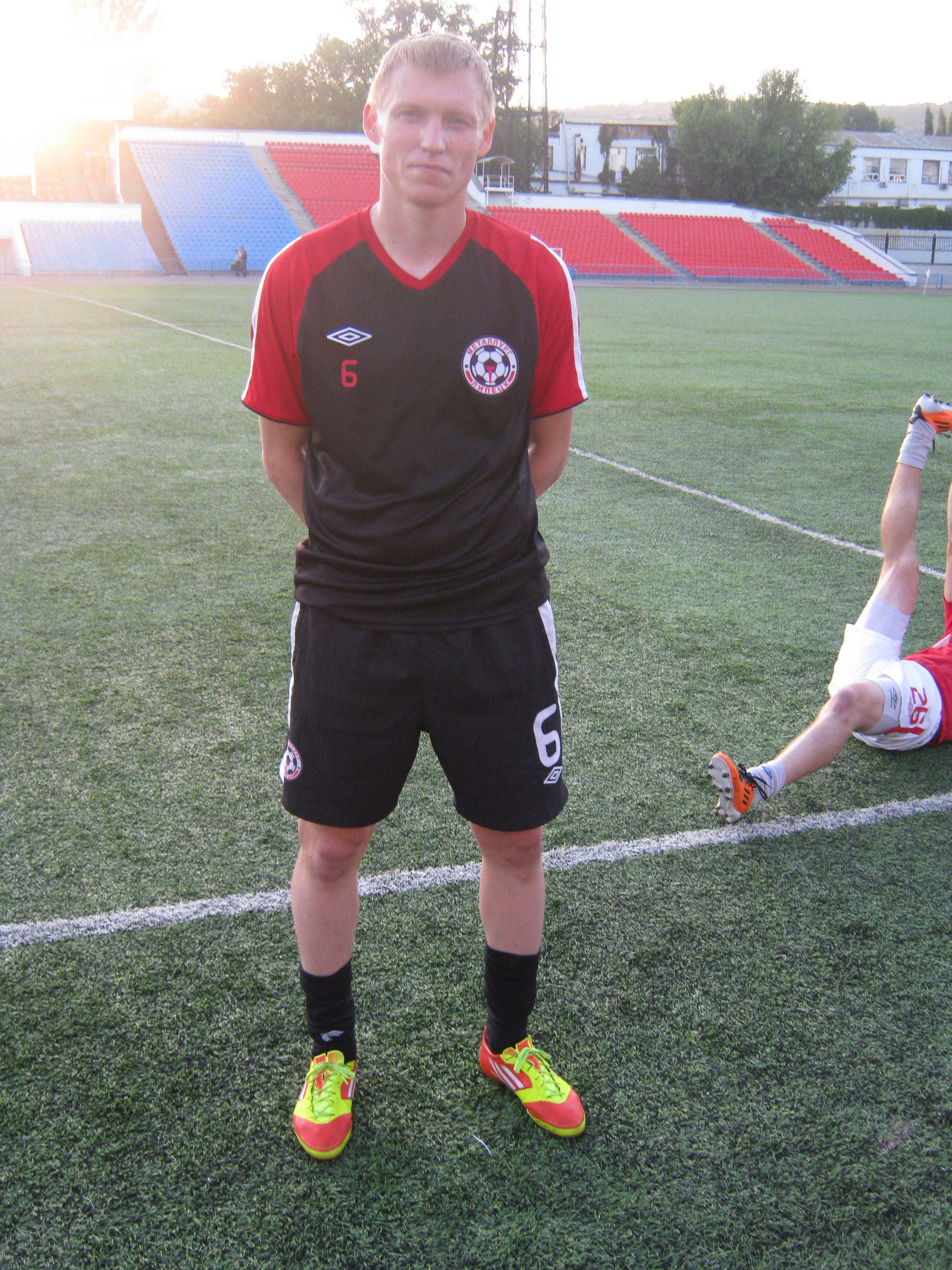

Personal information
- Full name: Andrei Nikolayevich Zakharenko
- Date of birth: 18 March 1979 (age 47)
- Place of birth: Lipetsk, Russian SFSR
- Height: 1.81 m (5 ft 11 in)
- Positions: Defender; midfielder

Senior career*
Years	Team	Apps	(Gls)
1998–1999	Metallurg Lipetsk	10	(0)
2000	Äänekosken Huima	15	(2)
2001	Rakuunat	24	(4)
2002–2005	Metallurg Lipetsk	101	(2)
2006	Torpedo Zhodino	25	(0)
2007–2012	Metallurg Lipetsk	80	(3)
- * Club domestic league appearances and goals

Andrei Nikolayevich Zakharenko (Russian: Андрей Николаевич Захаренко; born 18 March 1979) is a Russian former professional footballer who played as a defender or midfielder. He spent most of his career in Metallurg Lipetsk.
