= Zakar Zakarian =

French painter

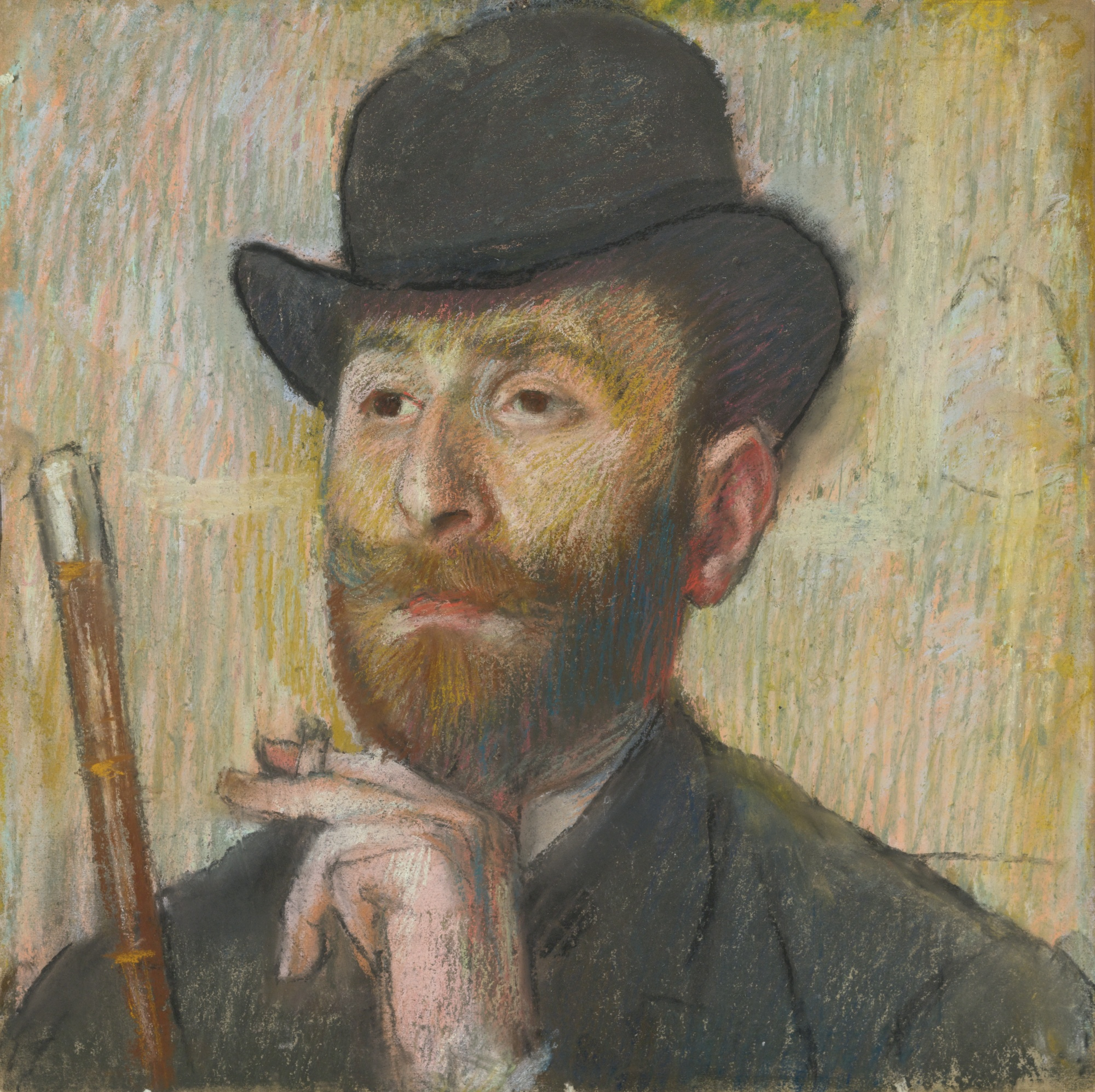
Portrait of Zacharian (circa 1885) by Edgar Degas

Zakar Zakarian (Armenian: Զաքար Զաքարյան; 1849 – 7 August 1923) was a French painter of Armenian descent.

== Biography ==
Born in Constantinople, Ottoman Empire, Zakarian received his primary education at a local school. In 1867 he emigrated to Paris to study medicine. After finishing Collège Sainte-Barbe's medical institution, he worked in hospitals.

In the 1870s he became a known painter and master of still lifes. Zakarian participated in international exhibitions, was awarded gold medals in 1889 and 1900 and Chevalier de la Légion d'honneur in 1899. He was considered a new Chardin, "without being a Chardin".

Edgar Degas, who was Zakarian's friend, painted his portrait in 1886. There are works by Zakarian in the museums of Paris, Yerevan, Echmiatsin, Venice and Beirut.

He died in Paris, France, on 7 August 1923 at the age of 74.

== Gallery ==
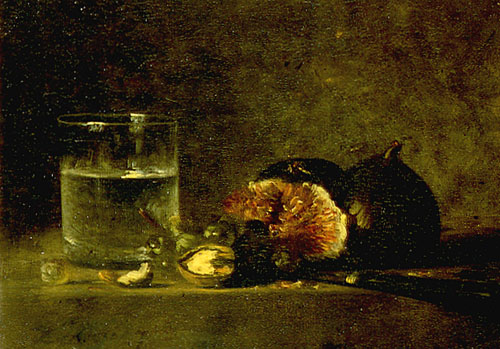
Naturemort

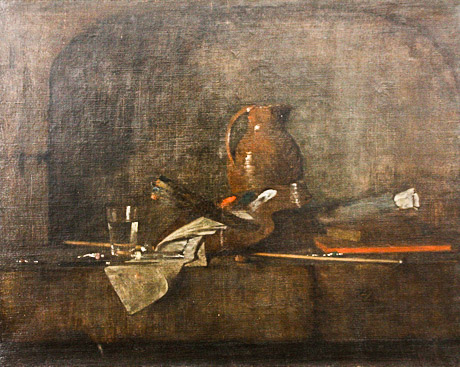
Still Life - Art Items (1900)
