= Aya (goddess) =

Mesopotamian goddess

- Goddess of dawn
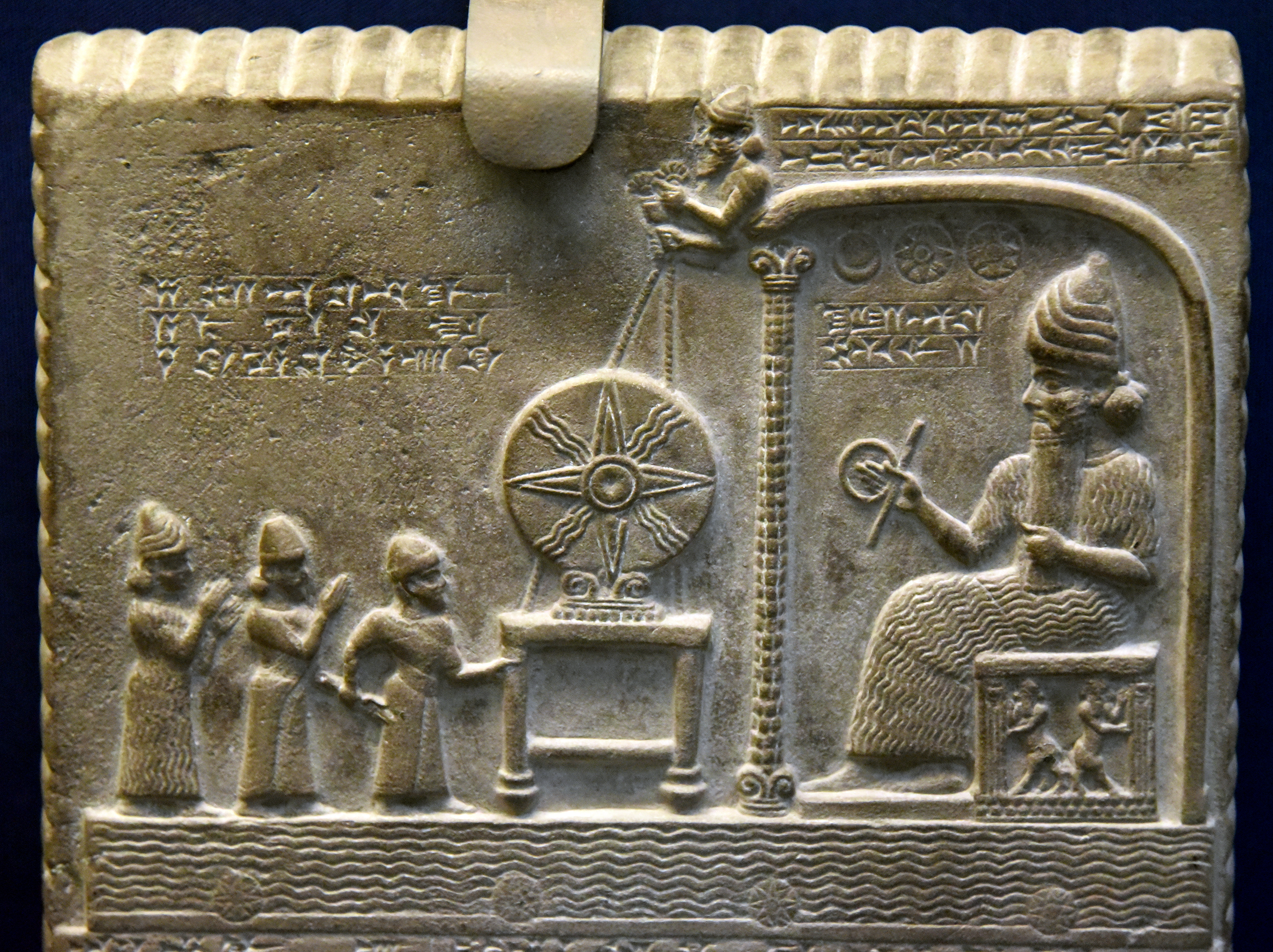
- A priest, Nabu-nadin-shum, and Aya lead the Babylonian king Nabu-aplu-iddina to the shrine of the Sun God. Above Shamash are the signs of Sin, Ishtar, and Shamash.
- Other names: Ayu-Ikalti, Nin-Aya, Sherida, Ninkar, Sudaĝ, Sudgan
- Major cult center: Sippar, Larsa

Genealogy
- Spouse: Shamash (Utu); Šimige (in Hurrian religion)
- Children: Mamu, Kittum, Ishum

Aya was a Mesopotamian goddess associated with dawn. Multiple variant names were attributed to her in god lists. She was regarded as the wife of Shamash, the sun god. She was worshiped alongside her husband in Sippar. Multiple royal inscriptions pertaining to this city mention her. She was also associated with the Nadītu community inhabiting it. She is less well attested in the other cult center of Shamash, Larsa, though she was venerated there as well. Additional attestations are available from Uruk, Mari and Assur. Aya was also incorporated into Hurrian religion, and in this context she appears as the wife of Shamash's counterpart Šimige.

== Names ==
Aya's name was written in cuneiform as ^{d}a-a (𒀭𒀀𒀀). It is sometimes romanized as Aia instead. It has Akkadian origin and means "dawn". Sporadically it could be prefixed with the sign NIN, with the variant form Nin-Aya attested in a dedicatory inscription of Manishtushu and in an offering list from Mari. NIN was a grammatically neutral title well attested as a part of theonyms, and in this context can be translated as "queen" or "mistress". It has been suggested that in Aya's case, it was used as a sumerogram representing the term "Lady". In Hurrian sources Aya was referred to as "Ayu-Ikalti". This form of the name was derived from the phrase Aya kallatu, "Aya the bride".

Multiple additional names of Aya are attested in god lists.

=== Sherida ===
Sherida (𒀭𒂠𒉪𒁕; ^{d}ŠÈ.NIR-da, also ^{d}ŠÈ.NIR, Šerida or Šerda) could function as a Sumerian equivalent of Aya's primary name. It has been suggested that it was a loanword derived from Akkadian šērtum, "morning". However, this proposal is not universally accepted.

The name Sherida is already attested in the Early Dynastic god lists from Fara and Abu Salabikh. Additionally, the theophoric name Ur-Sherida is known from Lagash and Ur. Gebhard J. Selz notes that if the assumption that it was an Akkadian loanword is accepted, she would be one of the earliest deities bearing names of Akkadian origin to be integrated into the pantheons of Sumerian-speaking areas. (Note: Other such examples, also identified in the Early Dynastic texts from Lagash, are Suen, a name of the moon god, and Ishtaran, a divine judge.) The name Sherida appears for the last time in cultic context in sources from Sippar and Larsa from the Old Babylonian period.

=== Sudaĝ and related names ===
Sudaĝ (^{d}sud-áĝ or ^{d}sù-da-áĝ), "golden yellow shine" or "golden yellow shining rock/metal", is attested as a name of Aya in multiple god lists, including An = Anum (tablet III, line 131) and its Old Babylonian forerunner. A further name present in the same source, Sudgan (tablet III, line 130), might have a similar meaning ("light", "glow"). Ninsudaĝ (^{d}nin-BU-áĝ, interpreted as ^{d}nin-sud4-áĝ), attested in the Early Dynastic god list from Fara and possibly in the Old Babylonian god list from Mari, might be a further variant of the name, though the reading is ultimately uncertain in this case.

Due to similarity of the names Sudaĝ and Sud, the tutelary goddess of Shuruppak equated with Ninlil, the latter appears in the role Ishum's mother in a single myth. However, according to Manfred Krebernik Sud and Sudaĝ were only confused with each other rather than conflated or syncretised.

=== Ninkar ===
Ninkar or Ninkara (from kár, "to light up") was one of the names of Aya according to An = Anum (tablet III, line 126). However, this theonym initially referred to a separate deity, presumably considered to be the goddess of daylight. In the oldest available sources her name was written as ^{d}nin-kar, while ^{d}nin-kár(-ra) first attested in the Ur III period is presumed to be a later variant. Joan Goodnick Westenholz argued that she is mentioned in one of the Early Dynastic Zame Hymns from Abu Salabikh. Manfred Krebernik initially also tentatively accepted that this text might contain a reference to Ninkar. However, later on in a translation of the text he prepared in collaboration with Jan Lisman the corresponding passage has been interpreted as a reference to a "quay (kar) of Ningal" instead. It is known that a temple dedicated to Ninkar existed in Lagash. She is additionally attested in the theophoric name Ur-Ninkar, one of whose bearers might have been a deified king of Umma.

Krebernik assumes that in texts from Ebla, the name Ninkar also refers to the spouse of a sun deity, who he assumed was seen as male in this city. Alfonso Archi instead concludes that the Eblaite sun deity was primarily female based on available lexical evidence. Westenholz proposed that Ninkar in Eblaite texts should be interpreted as Ninkarrak rather than the phonetically similar but less well attested Mesopotamian Ninkar. She pointed out occasional shortening of Ninkarrak's name to "Ninkar" is known from Mesopotamian sources. The identification of Eblaite Ninkar with Ninkarrak is also accepted by Archi.

=== Other names ===
Further names of Aya attested in An = Anum include Nin-mul-guna ("lady colorful star"; tablet III, line 132) and Nin-ul-šutag (𒀭𒎏𒌌𒋗𒋳; "lady delighted with charm"; tablet III, line 134, the end of the Aya section). Paul-Alain Beaulieu additionally proposes that Belet Larsa ("Lady of Larsa") known from a number of Neo-Babylonian letters might be identical with Aya.

== Character and iconography ==
Aya was considered the personification of dawn. She was associated with morning light and the rising sun. She was called the "morning-maker" Her other primary function was that of a divine bride, as exemplified by her epithet kallatum ("bride", "daughter-in-law"), and in this capacity she was regarded as epitome of beauty and charm. She was also commonly invoked to intercede with her husband Shamash on behalf of worshipers. This function is also well attested for other spouses of popular deities, such as Ninmug and Shala, the wives of Ishum and Adad, as well as for Inanna's sukkal Ninshubur.

The astronomical compendium MUL.APIN states that Aya was associated with the constellation Ewe, typically represented by the sumerogram ^{mul}U_{8}, though a source referring to it with the phonetic Akkadian translation, ^{mul}Immertu, is known too. It might have corresponded to the northeastern section of the constellation Boötes. However, ultimately its identification remains uncertain.

In Mesopotamian art Aya was commonly depicted frontally. Many depictions highlighted her beauty and sexual charm. On seals from Sippar she was often depicted wearing a type of garment which exposed her right breast, meant to emphasize her qualities as a charming and attractive bride. Ishtar and Annunitum (who in Sippar functioned as a separate goddess, rather than an epithet) were depicted similarly. The existence of an emblem representing Aya is mentioned in texts from Sippar, but no descriptions of it are known.

== Associations with other deities ==
As the wife of Shamash, Aya was regarded as the daughter-in-law of his parents Suen and Ningal and sister-in-law of his sister Ishtar. Their daughters were Mamu (or Mamud), the goddess of dreams and Kittum, the personification of truth. According to Joan Goodnick Westenholz another deity considered to be their child was Ishum.

In Hurrian sources Aya was also viewed as the spouse of a sun god, Šimige. A trilingual Sumero-Hurro-Ugaritic edition of the Weidner god list from Ugarit attests the equivalence between Shamash (Utu), Šimige and the local sun goddess Šapšu. Apparently to avoid the implications that Shapash had a wife, the scribes interpreted the name of Aya, present in the Mesopotamian original, as an unconventional writing of Ea, with his Hurrian name Eyan corresponding to it in the Hurrian column and local craftsman god Kothar-wa-Khasis in the Ugaritic one.

A single god list dated to the Middle Babylonian period or later equates Lahar with Aya and explains that the former should be understood as "Aya as the goddess of caring for things" (^{d}a-a šá ku-né-e), though Wilfred G. Lambert noted this equation is unusual, as Lahar was consistently regarded as male otherwise, and the evidence for connections between both goddesses and mortal women with herding sheep, a sphere of life he was associated with, is limited.

== Worship ==
Aya was already worshiped in the Early Dynastic period. While she is overall less well attested in textual record than major goddesses such as Ishtar, Nanaya, Ninlil or Ninisina, it is nonetheless assumed that she was a popular target of personal devotion, as she appears commonly in personal names and on seals, especially in the Old Babylonian period. In personal letters she is attested with frequency lesser only than Ishtar.

=== Sippar ===
Aya was worshiped in Sippar in the temple of Shamash, known under the ceremonial name Ebabbar. (Note: Sumerian: "shining white house".) They are the divine couple most often invoked together in seal inscriptions from this city, followed by Adad and Shala and Enki and Damkina. In legal texts, Aya often appears as a divine witness alongside her husband, their daughter Mamu and Shamash's sukkal Bunene. (Note: Like Aya and Shamash, Mamu and Bunene were also regarded as a couple.)

In the Sargonic period, Manishtushu dedicated a mace head to Aya in this city. Hammurabi of Babylon referred to himself as the "beloved of Aya" in an inscription commemorating the construction of new walls of Sippar in the twenty fifth year of his reign. He also mentioned Aya in an inscription commemorating the construction of a canal named after her, Aya-ḫegal, "Aya is abundance". Samsu-iluna called himself the "beloved of Shamash and Aya" and both renovated the Ebabbar and built walls around Sippar. It has also been noted that the Naditu community from this city were particularly closely associated with Aya, as evidenced by the fact that they addressed her as their mistress, commonly took theophoric names invoking her, and exclusively swore oaths by her. They were a class of women closely associated with Shamash. Their existence is particularly well attested in the Old Babylonian period, and it has been argued that the institution first developed around 1880 BCE, during the reign of Sumu-la-El of Babylon. Naditu lived in a building referred to as gagûm, conventionally translated as "cloister," and Tonia Sharlach notes they can be compared to medieval Christian nuns. They are sometimes described as "priestesses" in modern literature, but while it is well attested that they were considered to be dedicated to a specific deity, there is little evidence for their involvement in religious activities other than personal prayer, and it is not impossible they were understood as a fully separate social class.

=== Other Babylonian cities ===
It has been argued that in contrast with her position in Sippar, Aya was less prominent in the other city associated with Shamash, Larsa, where she does not appear in official lists of offerings. It is assumed that his temple in this city, which also bore the name Ebabbar, was nonetheless also dedicated to her. Some references to her are also present in texts from the Neo-Babylonian period, with one text mentioning the priests from Larsa sent jewelry of Aya and of the "divine daughter of Ebabbar" to Uruk for repairs. References to a "treasury of Shamash and Aya" are known too.

While Aya was not worshiped in Neo-Babylonian Uruk, she appears in ritual texts from this city from the Seleucid period. Julia Krul suggests that her introduction into the local pantheon reflected a broader phenomenon of incorporating spouses, children and servants of deities already worshiped locally (in this case Shamash) into it. She was celebrated during the New Year festival. In this context she appears alongside Shamash and Bunene.

A house of worship dedicated to Aya, the Edimgalanna ("house, great bond of heaven"), is mentioned in the Canonical Temple List, but its location is unknown.

=== Outside Babylonia ===
Aya was worshiped in Mari in the Old Babylonian period. She appears in theophoric names of women from this city with comparable frequency to Shamash and Dagan, the head god of the region, though less commonly than Annu, Ishtar, Išḫara, Kakka (regarded as a goddess in this city), Mamma and Admu. Examples include Aya-lamassi, Aya-ummi and Yatara-Aya.

A sanctuary dedicated to Aya, Eidubba ("house of storage bins") existed in Assur in Assyria.

=== Hurrian reception ===
Aya was among Mesopotamian deities incorporated into Hurrian religion. She is attested in the kaluti (offering lists) focused on Ḫepat and her circle. She is one of the Hurrian deities depicted in the Yazılıkaya sanctuary, where a relief of her can be seen in a procession of goddesses, between Nikkal and a figure who might represent Šauška. She is also attested in the itkalzi rituals.

== Mythology ==
An UD.GAL.NUN text known from five copies from Abu Salabikh and one from Fara which focuses on Utu traveling to various mountainous areas to bring deities or animals from them lists Šerda as the final of the deities he transports and describes her as a resident of the "mountain-lands of Amurru" (kur mar-tu). According to Kamran Vincent Zand, this term should be understood as a designation of the Middle Euphrates in this context, and is the westernmost area mentioned. He also points out the next line of the text mentions Mari.

Buduhudug, a mythical mountain where the sun was believed to set, was regarded as "the entrance of Shamash to Aya" (nēreb ^{d}Šamaš <ana> ^{d}Aya) - the place where they were able to reunite each day after Shamash finished his journey through the sky.

In the "Standard Babylonian" version of the Epic of Gilgamesh, Ninsun during her prayer to Shamash asks Aya three times to intercede on behalf of her son Gilgamesh to guarantee his safety both during the day and the night. Ninsun states that the optimal time for Aya to appeal to her husband is right after sunset, when he returns home from his daily journey.
