= Inanna =

Ancient Mesopotamian goddess

Inanna 𒀭𒈹(Ishtar)
- Queen of Heaven; Goddess of love, war, and fertility
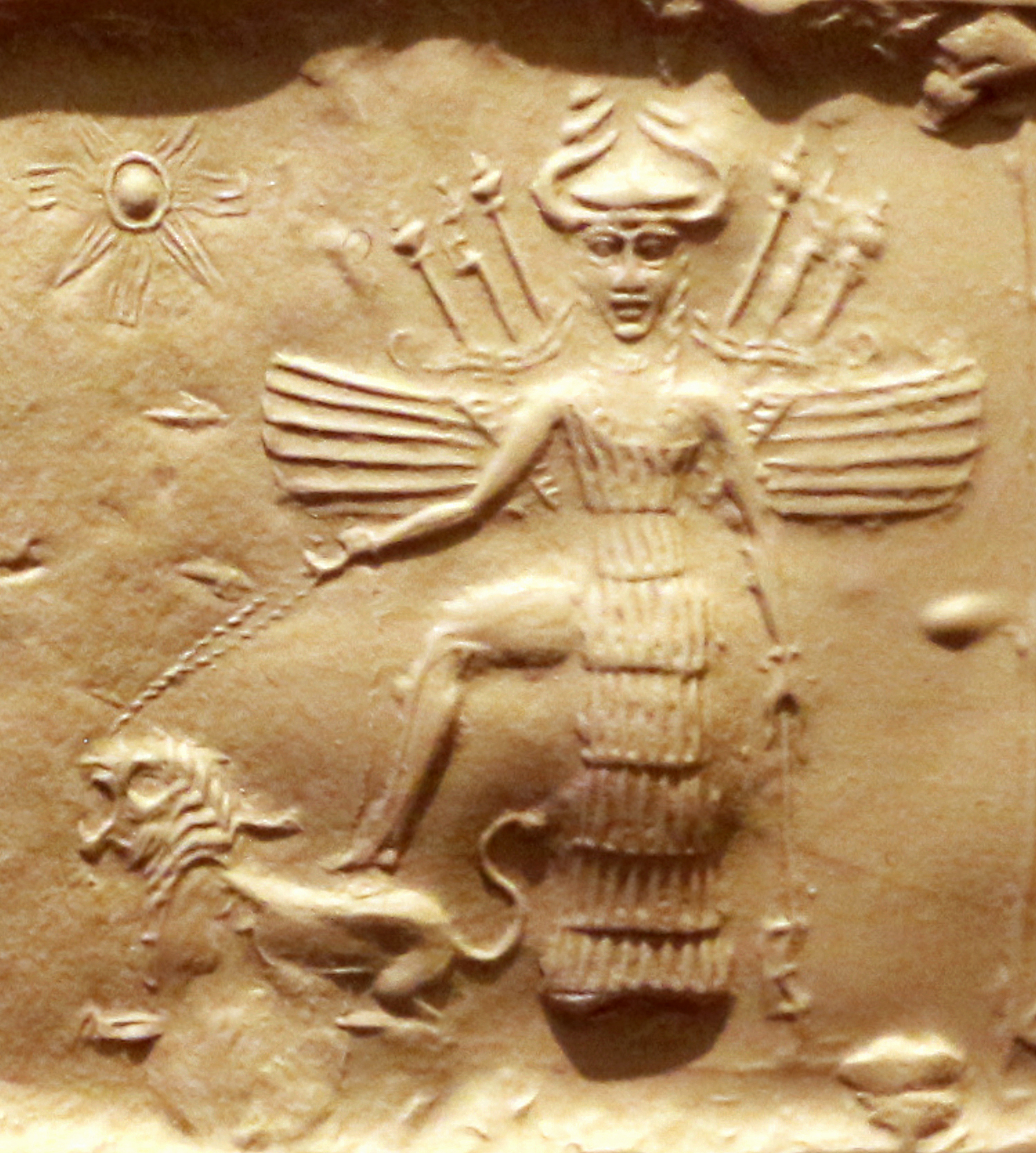
- Goddess Ishtar on an Akkadian seal, 2350–2150 BCE. She is equipped with weapons on her back, has a horned helmet, places her foot in a dominant posture upon a lion secured by a leash and is accompanied by the star of Shamash.
- Major cult center: Uruk; Agade; Nineveh
- Abode: Heaven
- Planet: Venus
- Symbol: Hook-shaped knot of reeds, six or eight-pointed star, lion, rose, dove
- Mount: Lion

Genealogy
- Parents: Most common tradition: Nanna and Ningal; Sometimes An or Enlil; Enki more rarely
- Siblings: Utu/Shamash (twin brother); Ereshkigal (older sister)
- Consort: Dumuzid, Sargon of Akkad, Zababa
- Children: Possibly Nanaya

Equivalents
- Canaanite: Astarte
- Greek: Aphrodite
- Roman: Venus
- Elamite: Pinikir
- Hurrian: Shaushka
- Mandaean: Libat
- Egyptian: Isis
- Iranian: Anahita

Inanna (Note: /ɪˈnɑːnə/; Sumerian: 𒀭𒈹, romanized: ^{D}INANA vocalized as: Inanak, also 𒀭𒊩𒌆𒀭𒈾, ^{D}nin-an-na) is the ancient Mesopotamian goddess of war, love, and sex. She is also associated with political power, divine law, sensuality, and procreation. Originally worshipped in Sumer, she was known by the Akkadians, Babylonians, and Assyrians as Ishtar. (Note: /ˈɪʃtɑːr/; Sumerian: 𒀭𒀹𒁯, romanized: ^{D}ištar,) Her primary title is "the Queen of Heaven".

She was the patron goddess of the Eanna temple at the city of Uruk, her early main religious center. In archaic Uruk, she was worshipped in three forms: morning Inanna (Inana-UD/hud), evening Inanna (Inanna sig), and princely Inanna (Inanna NUN), the former two reflecting the phases of her associated planet Venus. Her most prominent symbols include the lion and the eight-pointed star. Her husband is the god Dumuzid (later known as Tammuz), and her sukkal (attendant) is the goddess Ninshubur, later conflated with the male deities Ilabrat and Papsukkal.

Inanna was worshipped in Sumer as early as the Uruk period (c. 4000 – 3100 BCE), and her worship was relatively localized before the conquest of Sargon of Akkad. During the post-Sargonic era, she became one of the most widely venerated deities in the Sumerian pantheon, with temples across Mesopotamia. Adoration of Inanna/Ishtar was continued by the East Semitic-speaking peoples (Akkadians, Assyrians and Babylonians) who succeeded and absorbed the Sumerians in the region.

The Assyrians elevated her to become the highest deity in their pantheon, ranking close to their own national god Ashur. Inanna/Ishtar is alluded to in the Hebrew Bible and she greatly influenced the Ugaritic goddess Ashtart and later the Phoenician goddess Astarte, who in turn possibly influenced the development of the Greek goddess Aphrodite. Her worship continued to flourish until its gradual decline between the first and sixth centuries CE in the wake of Christianity.

Inanna appears in more myths than any other Sumerian deity. She also has a uniquely high number of epithets and alternate names, comparable only to Nergal.

Many of her myths involve her taking over the domains of other deities. She is believed to have been given the mes, which represent all positive and negative aspects of civilization, by Enki, the god of wisdom. She is also believed to have taken over the Eanna temple from An, the god of the sky. Alongside her twin brother Utu (later known as Shamash), Inanna is the enforcer of divine justice; she destroyed Mount Ebih for having challenged her authority, unleashed her fury upon the gardener Shukaletuda after he raped her in her sleep, and tracked down the bandit woman Bilulu and killed her in divine retribution for having murdered Dumuzid. In the standard Akkadian version of the Epic of Gilgamesh, Ishtar asks Gilgamesh to become her consort. When he disdainfully refuses, she unleashes the Bull of Heaven, resulting in the death of Enkidu and Gilgamesh's subsequent grapple with his own mortality.

Inanna's most famous myth is the story of her descent into and return from the ancient Mesopotamian underworld, ruled by her older sister Ereshkigal. After she reaches Ereshkigal's throne room, the seven judges of the underworld deem her guilty and strike her dead. Three days later, Ninshubur pleads with all the gods to bring Inanna back. All of them refuse her, except Enki, who sends two sexless beings to rescue Inanna.

They escort Inanna out of the underworld but the galla, the guardians of the underworld, drag her husband Dumuzid down to the underworld as her replacement. Dumuzid is eventually permitted to return to heaven for half the year, while his sister Geshtinanna remains in the underworld for the other half, resulting in the cycle of the seasons.

== Etymology ==
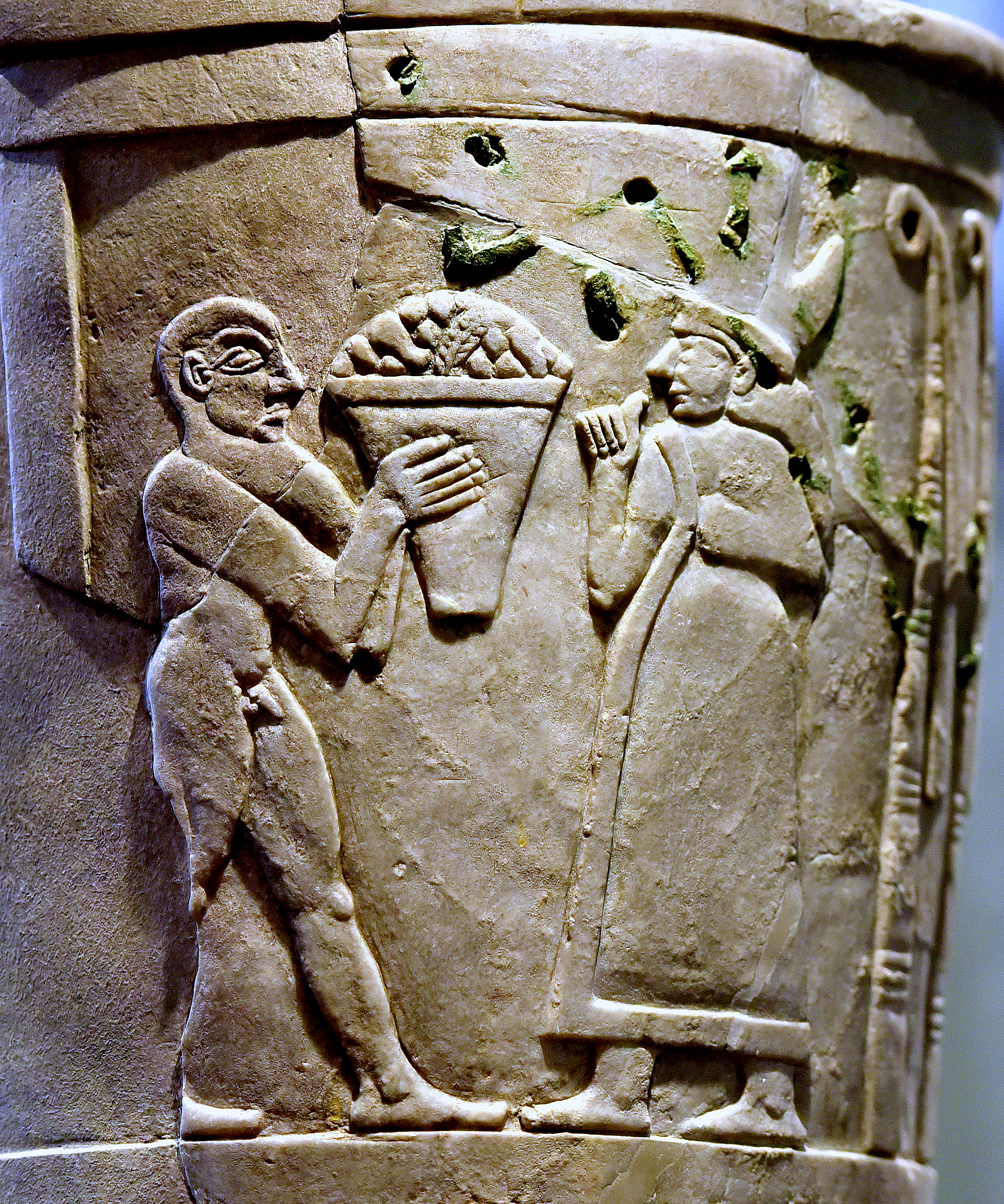
Inanna receiving offerings on the Uruk Vase, circa 3200–3000 BCE

Scholars believe that Inanna and Ishtar were originally separate, unrelated deities, but were conflated with one another during the reign of Sargon of Akkad; they came to be regarded as effectively the same goddess under two different names. (Note: With exception of Ana Kurnugê, qaqqari la târi and Sha naqba īmuru who use the name Ishtar, all others texts use the name/are about Inanna.) Inanna's name may derive from the Sumerian phrase nin-an-ak, meaning "Lady of Heaven", but the cuneiform sign for Inanna (𒈹) is not a ligature of the signs lady (Sumerian: nin; cuneiform: 𒊩𒌆 SAL.TUG_{2}) and sky (Sumerian: an; cuneiform: 𒀭 AN). These difficulties led some early Assyriologists to suggest that Inanna may have originally been a Proto-Euphratean goddess, who was only later accepted into the Sumerian pantheon. This idea was supported by Inanna's youthfulness, as well as the fact that, unlike the other Sumerian divinities, she seems to have initially lacked a distinct sphere of responsibilities. The view that there was a Proto-Euphratean substrate language in Southern Iraq before Sumerian is not widely accepted by modern Assyriologists.

The name Ishtar occurs as an element in personal names from both the pre-Sargonic and post-Sargonic eras in Akkad, Assyria, and Babylonia. It is of Semitic derivation and is probably etymologically related to the name of the West Semitic god Attar, who is mentioned in later inscriptions from Ugarit and southern Arabia. The morning star may have been conceived as a male deity who presided over the arts of war and the evening star may have been conceived as a female deity who presided over the arts of love. Among the Akkadians, Assyrians, and Babylonians, the name of the male god eventually supplanted the name of his female counterpart, but, due to extensive syncretism with Inanna, the deity remained as female, although her name was in the masculine form.

== Origins and development ==
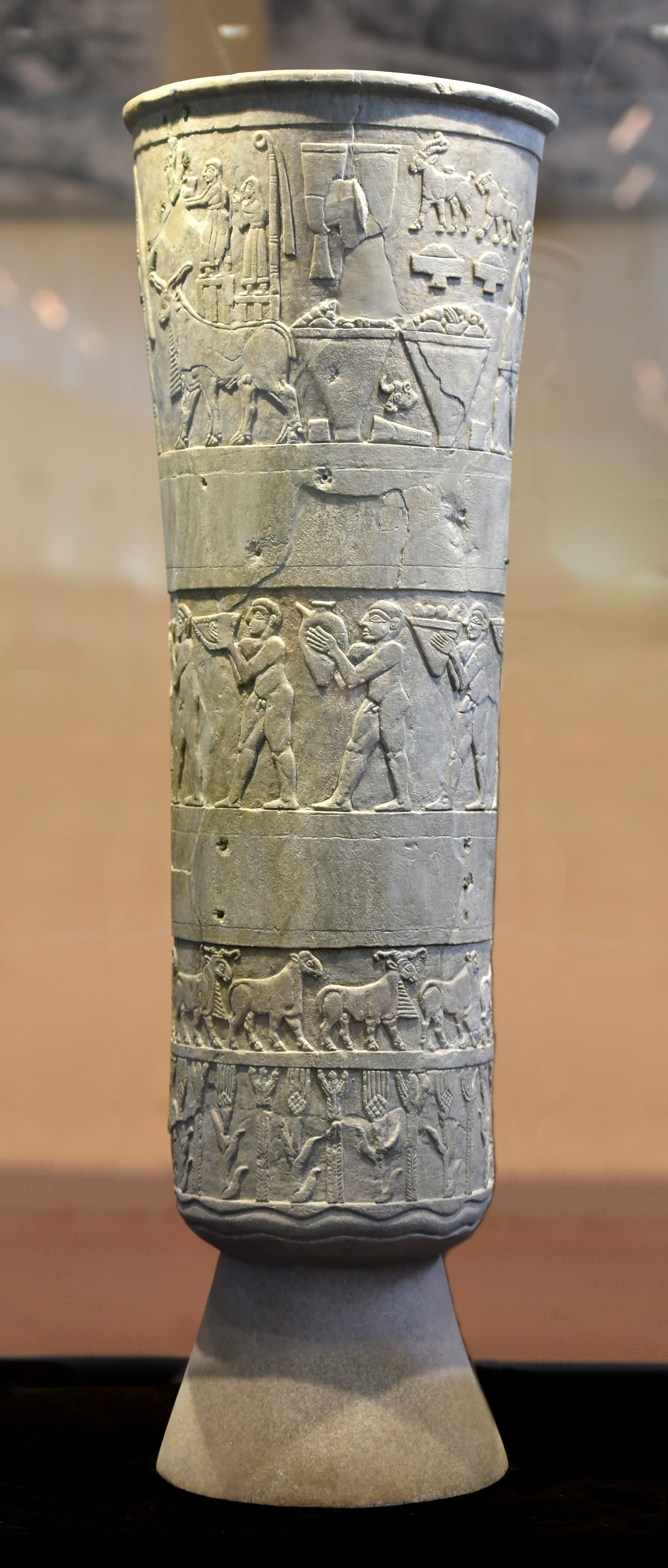
The Uruk Vase (Warka Vase), depicting votive offerings to Inanna (3200–3000 BCE)

Inanna has posed a problem for many scholars of ancient Sumer due to the fact that her sphere of power contained more distinct and contradictory aspects than that of any other deity. Two major theories regarding her origins have been proposed. The first explanation holds that Inanna is the result of a syncretism between several previously unrelated Sumerian deities with totally different domains. The second explanation holds that Inanna was originally a Semitic deity who entered the Sumerian pantheon after it was already fully structured, and who took on all the roles that had not yet been assigned to other deities.

As early as the Uruk period (c. 4000–3100 BCE), Inanna was already associated with the city of Uruk. During this period, the symbol of a ring-headed doorpost was closely associated with Inanna. The famous Uruk Vase (found in a deposit of cult objects of the Uruk III period) depicts a row of naked men carrying various objects, including bowls, vessels, and baskets of farm products, and bringing sheep and goats to a female figure facing the ruler. The female stands in front of Inanna's symbol of the two twisted reeds of the doorpost, while the male figure holds a box and stack of bowls, the later cuneiform sign signifying the En, or high priest of the temple.

Seal impressions from the Jemdet Nasr period (c. 3100–2900 BCE) show a fixed sequence of symbols representing various cities, including those of Ur, Larsa, Zabalam, Urum, Arina, and probably Kesh. This list probably reflects the report of contributions to Inanna at Uruk from cities supporting her cult. A large number of similar seals have been discovered from phase I of the Early Dynastic period (c. 2900–2350 BCE) at Ur, in a slightly different order, combined with the rosette symbol of Inanna. These seals were used to lock storerooms to preserve materials set aside for her cult.

Various inscriptions in the name of Inanna are known, such as a bead in the name of King Aga of Kish c. 2600 BCE, or a tablet by King Lugal-kisalsi c. 2400 BCE:

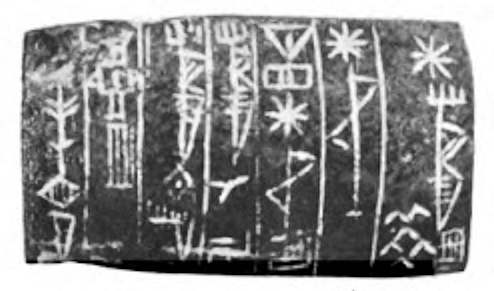
Tablet of Lugal-kisalsi. The symbol for Inanna is in the 2nd column from the right.

For An, king of all the lands, and for Inanna, his mistress, Lugal-kisalsi, king of Kish, built the wall of the courtyard.

— Inscription of Lugal-kisalsi.

During the Akkadian period (c. 2334–2154 BCE), following the conquests of Sargon of Akkad, Inanna and originally independent Ishtar became so extensively syncretized that they became regarded as effectively the same. The Akkadian poet Enheduanna, the daughter of Sargon, wrote numerous hymns to Inanna, identifying her with Ishtar. As a result of this, the popularity of Inanna/Ishtar's cult skyrocketed. Alfonso Archi, who was involved in early excavations of Ebla, assumes Ishtar was originally a goddess venerated in the Euphrates valley, pointing out that an association between her and the desert poplar is attested in the most ancient texts from both Ebla and Mari. He considers her, a moon god (e.g., Sin) and a sun deity of varying gender (Shamash/Shapash) to be the only deities shared between various early Semitic peoples of Mesopotamia and ancient Syria, who otherwise had different not necessarily overlapping pantheons.

== Worship ==
Inanna's symbol: the reed ring-post

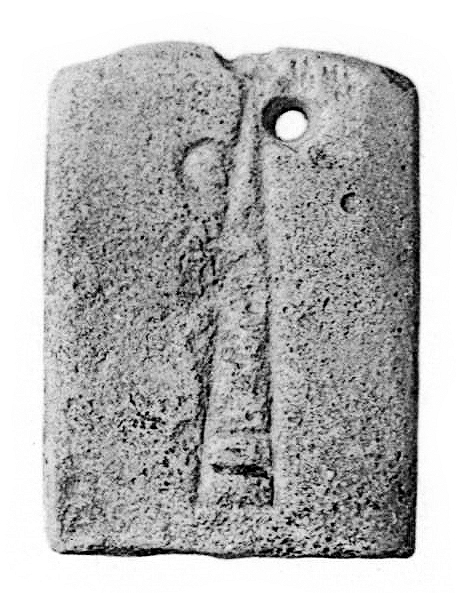
Emblem of goddess Inanna, circa 3000 BCE

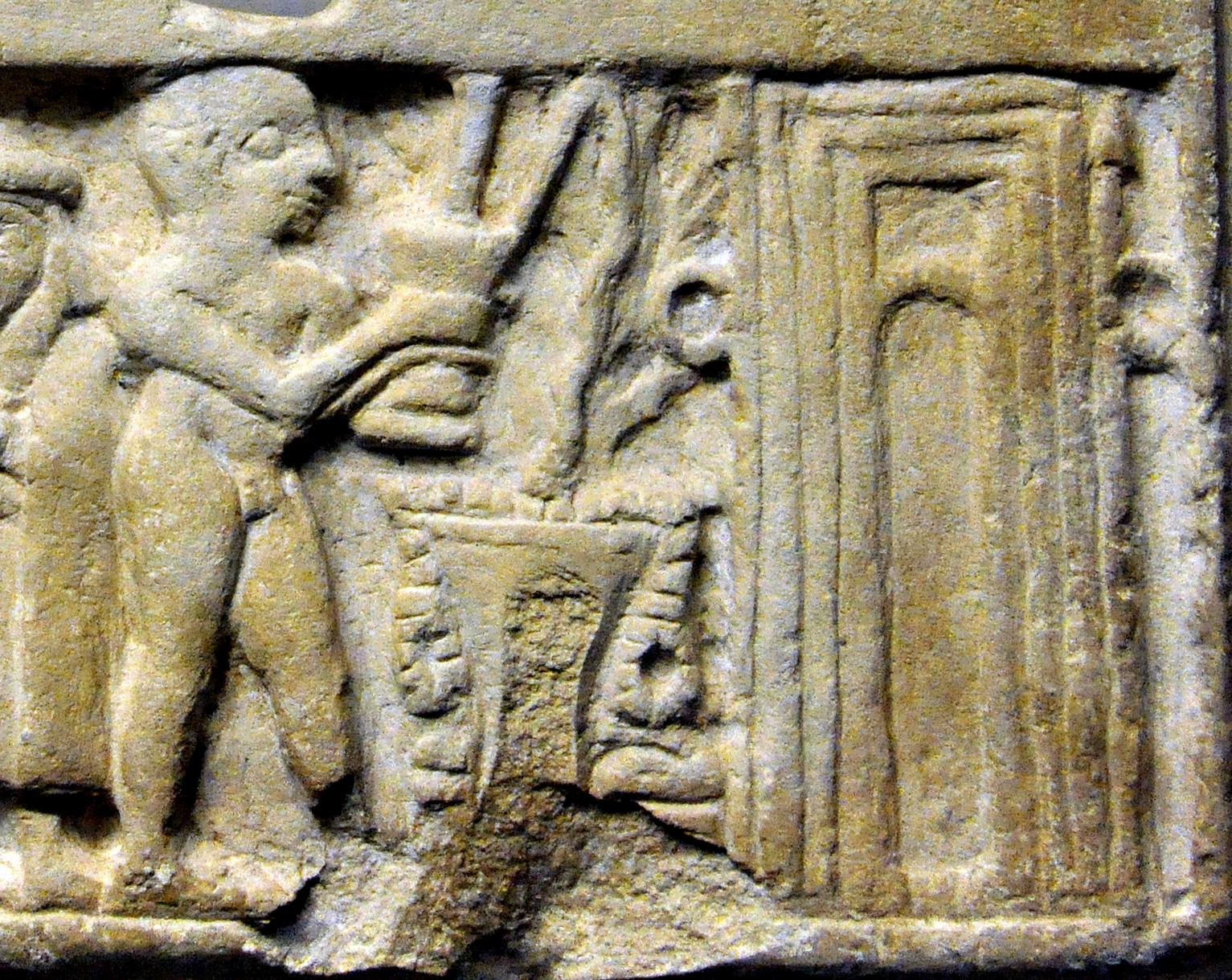
Ring posts of Inanna on each side of a temple door, with naked devotee offering libations

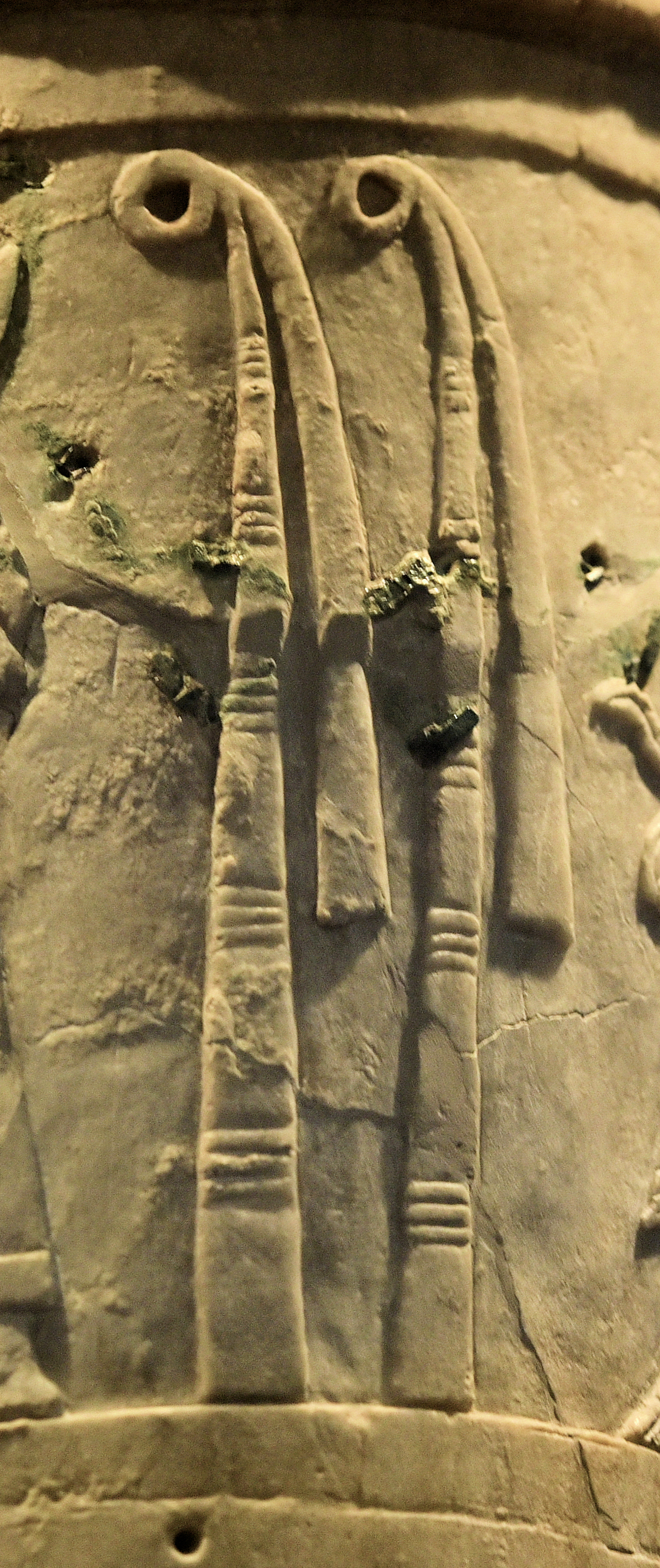
On the Warka Vase

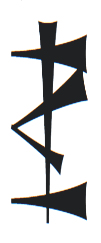
Cuneiform logogram "Inanna"

Inanna's symbol is a ring post made of reed, a ubiquitous building material in Sumer. It was often beribboned and positioned at the entrance of temples, and marked the limit between the profane and the sacred realms. The design of the emblem was simplified between 3000 and 2000 BCE to become the cuneiform logogram for Inanna: 𒈹, generally preceded by the symbol for "deity" 𒀭.

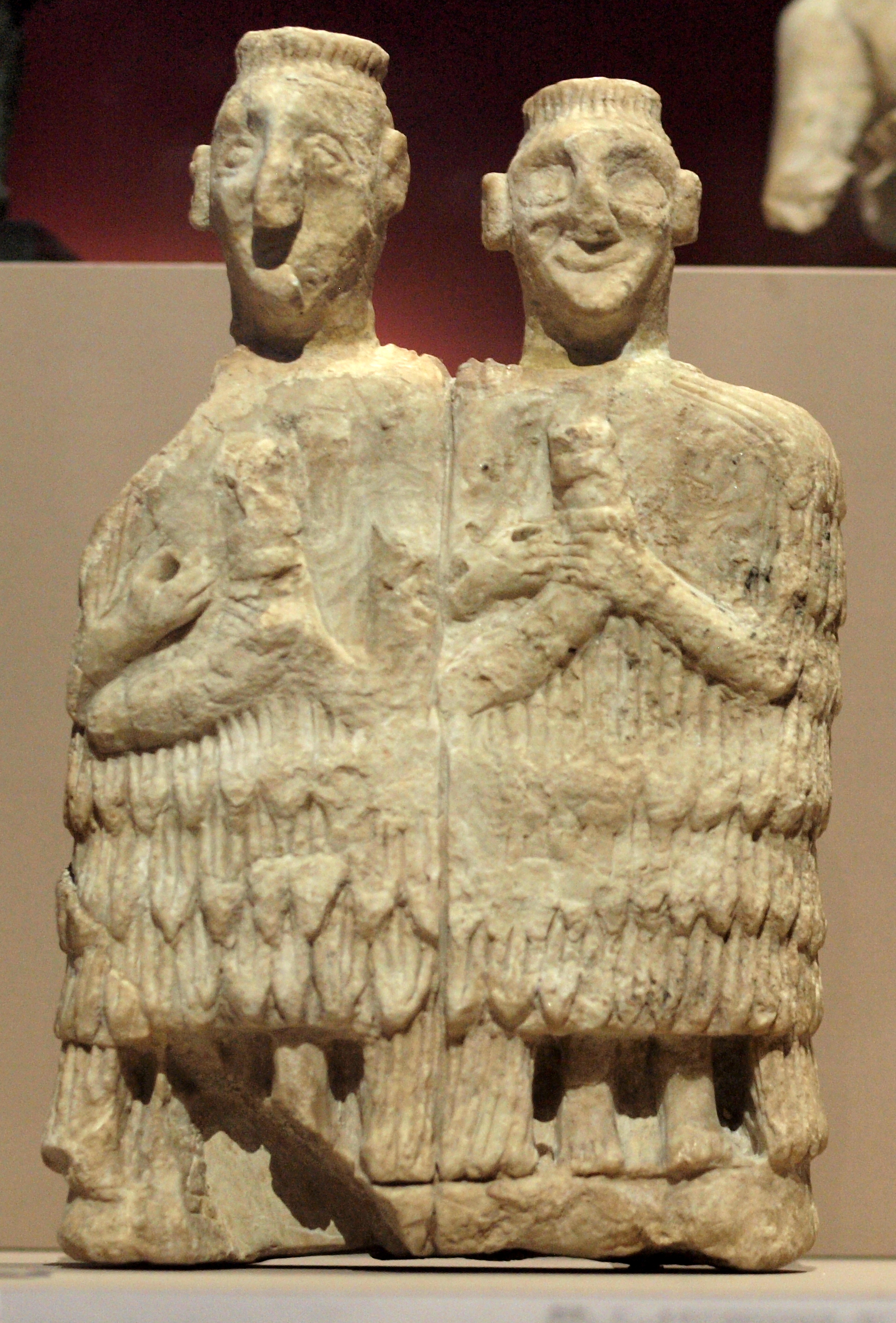
Ancient Sumerian statuette of two gala priests, dating to c. 2450 BCE, found in the temple of Inanna at Mari

Gwendolyn Leick assumes that during the Pre-Sargonic era, the cult of Inanna was rather limited, though other experts argue that she was already the most prominent deity in Uruk and a number of other political centers in the Uruk period. She had temples in Nippur, Lagash, Shuruppak, Zabalam, and Ur, but her main cult center was the Eanna temple in Uruk, (Note: modern-day Warka, Biblical Erech) whose name means "House of Heaven" (Sumerian: e_{2}-anna; cuneiform: 𒂍𒀭 E_{2}.AN). (Note: é-an-na means 'sanctuary' ('house' + 'Heaven' [An] + genitive)) Some research assumes that the original patron deity of this fourth-millennium BCE city was An. After its dedication to Inanna, the temple seems to have housed priestesses of the goddess. Next to Uruk, Zabalam was the most important early site of Inanna worship, as the name of the city was commonly written with the signs MUŠ_{3} and UNUG, meaning respectively "Inanna" and "sanctuary". It is possible that the city goddess of Zabalam was originally a distinct deity, though one whose cult was absorbed by that of the Urukean goddess very early on. Joan Goodnick Westenholz proposed that a goddess identified by the name Nin-UM (reading and meaning uncertain), associated with Ishtaran in a zame hymn, was the original identity of Inanna of Zabalam.

In the Old Akkadian period, Inanna merged with the Akkadian goddess Ishtar, associated with the city of Agade. A hymn from that period addresses the Akkadian Ishtar as "Inanna of the Ulmaš" alongside Inanna of Uruk and of Zabalam. The worship of Ishtar and syncretism between her and Inanna was encouraged by Sargon and his successors, and as a result she quickly became one of the most widely venerated deities in the Mesopotamian pantheon. In inscriptions of Sargon, Naram-Sin, and Shar-Kali-Sharri, Ishtar is the most frequently invoked deity.

In the Old Babylonian period, her main cult centers were Uruk, Zabalam, Agade, and Ilip. Her cult was also introduced from Uruk to Kish.

During later times, while her cult in Uruk continued to flourish, Ishtar also became particularly worshipped in the Upper Mesopotamian kingdom of Assyria (modern northern Iraq, northeast Syria, and southeast Turkey), especially in the cities of Nineveh, Aššur, and Arbela (modern Erbil). During the reign of the Assyrian king Assurbanipal, Ishtar rose to become the most important and widely venerated deity in the Assyrian pantheon, surpassing even the Assyrian national god Ashur. Votive objects found in her primary Assyrian temple indicate that she was a popular deity among women.

Individuals who practiced gender nonconformity were heavily involved in the cult of Inanna. During Sumerian times, a set of priests known as gala worked in Inanna's temples, where they performed elegies and lamentations. Men who became gala sometimes adopted female names, and their songs were composed in the Sumerian eme-sal dialect, which, in literary texts, is normally reserved for the speech of female characters. Some Sumerian proverbs seem to suggest that gala had a reputation for engaging in anal sex with men. During the Akkadian Period, kurgarrū and assinnu were servants of Ishtar who dressed in female clothing and performed war dances in Ishtar's temples. Several Akkadian proverbs seem to suggest that they may have also had homosexual proclivities. Gwendolyn Leick, an anthropologist known for her writings on Mesopotamia, has compared these individuals to the contemporary Indian hijra. In one Akkadian hymn, Ishtar is described as transforming men into women, and women into men.

Throughout the latter half of the twentieth century, it was widely believed that the cult of Inanna involved a "sacred marriage" ritual, in which a king would establish his legitimacy by taking on the role of Dumuzid and engaging in ritual sexual intercourse with the high priestess of Inanna, who took on the role of the goddess. This view has been challenged, however, and scholars continue to debate whether the sacred marriage described in literary texts involved any kind of physical ritual enactment at all and, if so, whether this ritual enactment involved actual intercourse or merely the symbolic representation of intercourse. The scholar of the ancient Near East Louise M. Pryke states that most scholars now maintain, if the sacred marriage was a ritual that was actually acted out, then it involved only symbolic intercourse.

The cult of Ishtar was long thought to have involved sacred prostitution, but this is now rejected among many scholars. Hierodules known as ishtaritum are reported to have worked in Ishtar's temples, but it is unclear if such priestesses actually performed any sex acts, and several modern scholars have argued that they did not. Women across the ancient Near East worshipped Ishtar by dedicating to her cakes baked in ashes (known as kamān tumri). A dedication of this type is described in an Akkadian hymn. Several clay cake molds discovered at Mari are shaped like naked women with large hips who are clutching their breasts. Some scholars have suggested that the cakes made from these molds were intended as representations of Ishtar herself. In the Biblical book of Jeremiah, the prophet condemns Judean female refugees for worshipping the Queen of Heaven (a syncretism of Ishtar and Asherah) by baking cakes with the goddess's image upon them and pouring libations to her (Jer. Ch. 7 and 44). The women and their husbands defy him, and state that they will follow the practices of their ancestors, who performed these acts "in the towns of Judea and the streets of Jerusalem" (Jer. 44:15–19). In Ezekiel 8:14, the prophet has a vision of the women of Jerusalem weeping for Tammuz.

== Iconography ==
=== Symbols ===
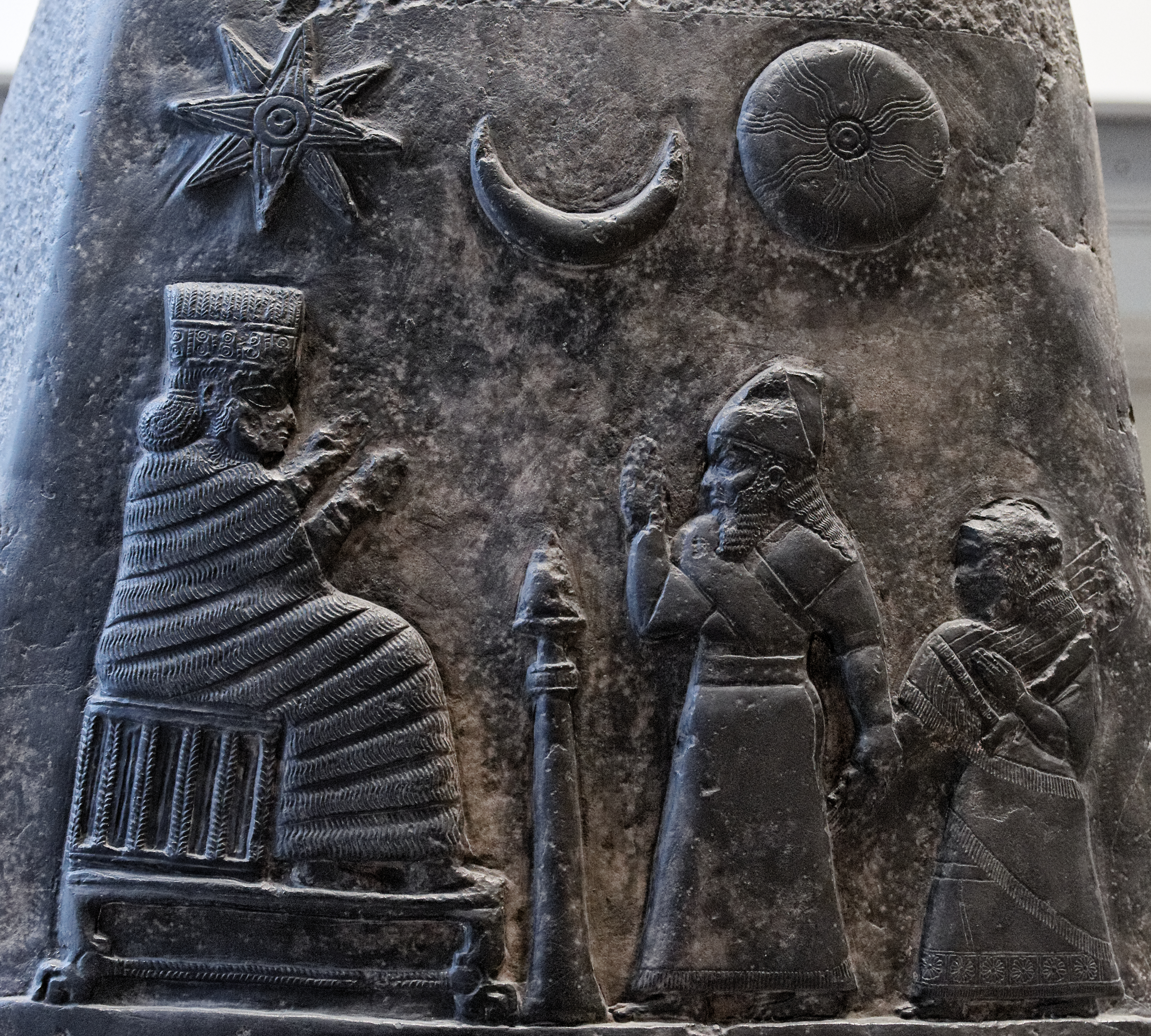
The eight-pointed star was Inanna/Ishtar's most common symbol. Here it is shown alongside the solar disk of her brother Shamash (Sumerian Utu) and the crescent moon of her father Sin (Sumerian Nanna) on a boundary stone of Meli-Shipak II, dating to the twelfth century BCE.

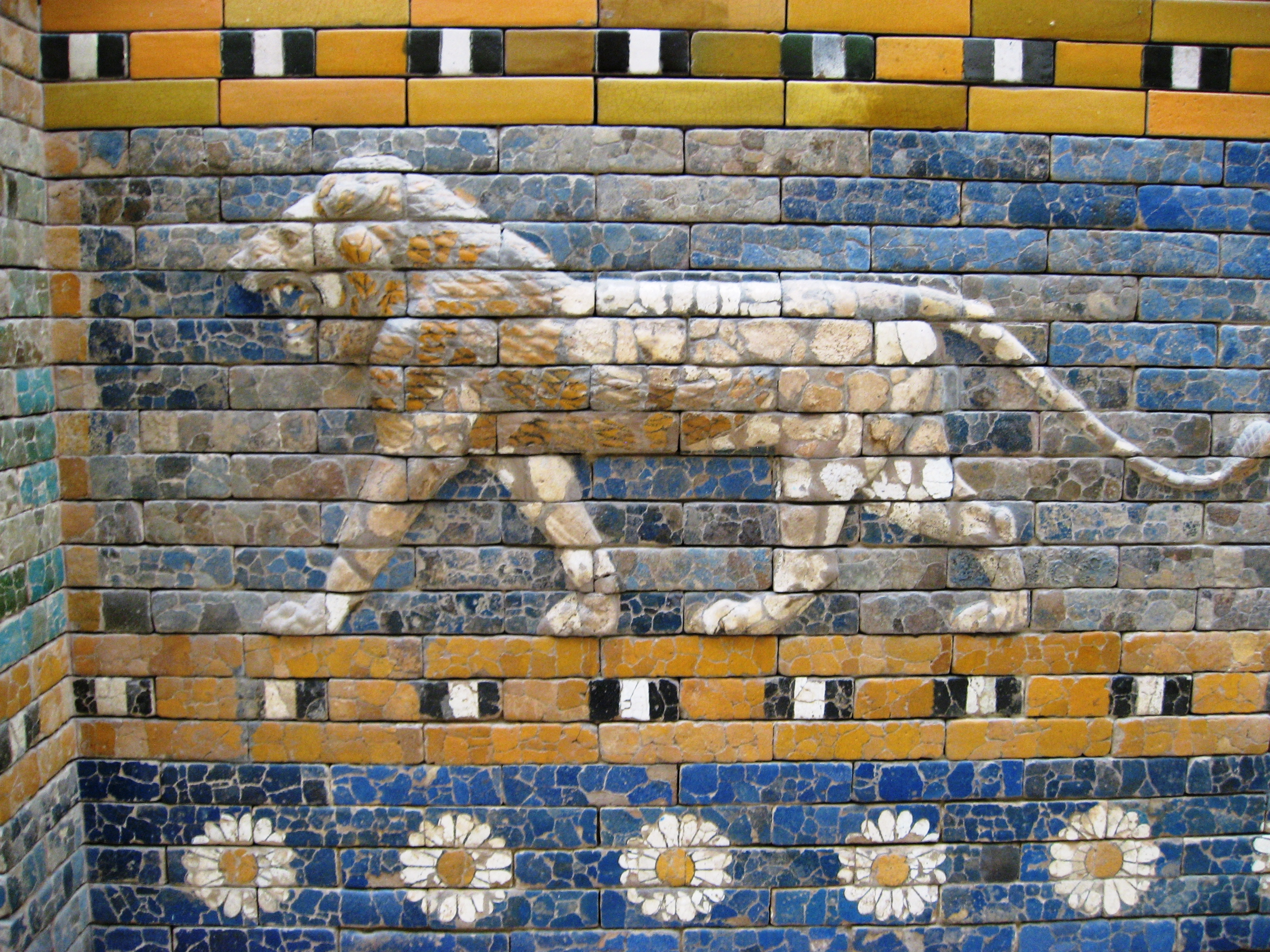
Lions were one of Inanna/Ishtar's primary symbols. The lion above comes from the Ishtar Gate, the eighth gate to the inner city of Babylon, which was constructed in around 575 BCE under the orders of Nebuchadnezzar II.

Inanna/Ishtar's most common symbol was the eight-pointed star, though the exact number of points sometimes varies; six-pointed stars also occur frequently, but their symbolic meaning is unknown. The eight-pointed star seems to have originally borne a general association with the heavens, but, by the Old Babylonian Period (c. 1830 – c. 1531 BCE), it had come to be specifically associated with the planet Venus, with which Ishtar was identified. Starting during this same period, the star of Ishtar was normally enclosed within a circular disc. During later Babylonian times, slaves who worked in Ishtar's temples were sometimes branded with the seal of the eight-pointed star. On boundary stones and cylinder seals, the eight-pointed star is sometimes shown alongside the crescent moon, which was the symbol of Sin (Sumerian Nanna) and the rayed solar disk, which was a symbol of Shamash (Sumerian Utu).

Inanna's cuneiform ideogram was a hook-shaped twisted knot of reeds, representing the doorpost of the storehouse, a common symbol of fertility and plenty. The rosette was another important symbol of Inanna, which continued to be used as a symbol of Ishtar after their syncretism. During the Neo-Assyrian Period (911 – 609 BCE), the rosette may have actually eclipsed the eight-pointed star and become Ishtar's primary symbol. The temple of Ishtar in the city of Aššur was adorned with numerous rosettes.

Inanna/Ishtar was associated with lions, which the ancient Mesopotamians regarded as a symbol of power. Her associations with lions began during Sumerian times; a chlorite bowl from the temple of Inanna at Nippur depicts a large feline battling a giant snake and a cuneiform inscription on the bowl reads "Inanna and the Serpent", indicating that the cat is supposed to represent the goddess. During the Akkadian Period, Ishtar was frequently depicted as a heavily armed warrior goddess with a lion as one of her attributes.

Doves were also prominent animal symbols associated with Inanna/Ishtar. Doves are shown on cultic objects associated with Inanna as early as the beginning of the third millennium BCE. Lead dove figurines were discovered in the temple of Ishtar at Aššur, dating to the thirteenth century BCE and a painted fresco from Mari, Syria shows a giant dove emerging from a palm tree in the temple of Ishtar, indicating that the goddess herself was sometimes believed to take the form of a dove.

=== As the planet Venus ===
Inanna was associated with the planet Venus, which is named after her Roman equivalent. Several hymns praise Inanna in her role as the goddess or personification of the planet Venus. Theology professor Jeffrey Cooley has argued that, in many myths, Inanna's movements may correspond with the movements of Venus across the sky. In Inanna's Descent to the Underworld, Inanna, unlike any other deity, is able to descend into the netherworld and return to the heavens. The planet Venus appears to make a similar descent, setting in the West and then rising again in the East. An introductory hymn describes Inanna leaving the heavens and heading for Kur, what could be presumed to be the mountains, replicating the rising and setting of Inanna to the West. In Inanna and Shukaletuda, Shukaletuda is described as scanning the heavens in search of Inanna, possibly searching the Eastern and Western horizons. In the same myth, while searching for her attacker, Inanna herself makes several movements that correspond with the movements of Venus in the sky.

Because the movements of Venus appear to be discontinuous (it disappears due to its proximity to the Sun, for many days at a time, and then reappears on the other horizon), some cultures did not recognize Venus as a single entity; instead, they assumed it to be two separate stars on each horizon: the morning and evening star. Nonetheless, a cylinder seal from the Jemdet Nasr period indicates that the ancient Sumerians knew that the morning and evening stars were the same celestial object. The discontinuous movements of Venus relate to both mythology as well as Inanna's dual nature.

Modern astrologers recognize the story of Inanna's descent into the underworld as a reference to an astronomical phenomenon associated with retrograde Venus. Seven days before retrograde Venus makes its inferior conjunction with the sun, it disappears from the evening sky. The seven day period between this disappearance and the conjunction itself is seen as the astronomical phenomenon on which the myth of descent was based. After the conjunction, seven more days elapse before Venus appears as the morning star, corresponding to the ascent from the underworld.

Inanna in her aspect as Anunītu was associated with the eastern fish of the zodiacal constellation, Pisces. Her consort Dumuzi was associated with the contiguous constellation, Aries.

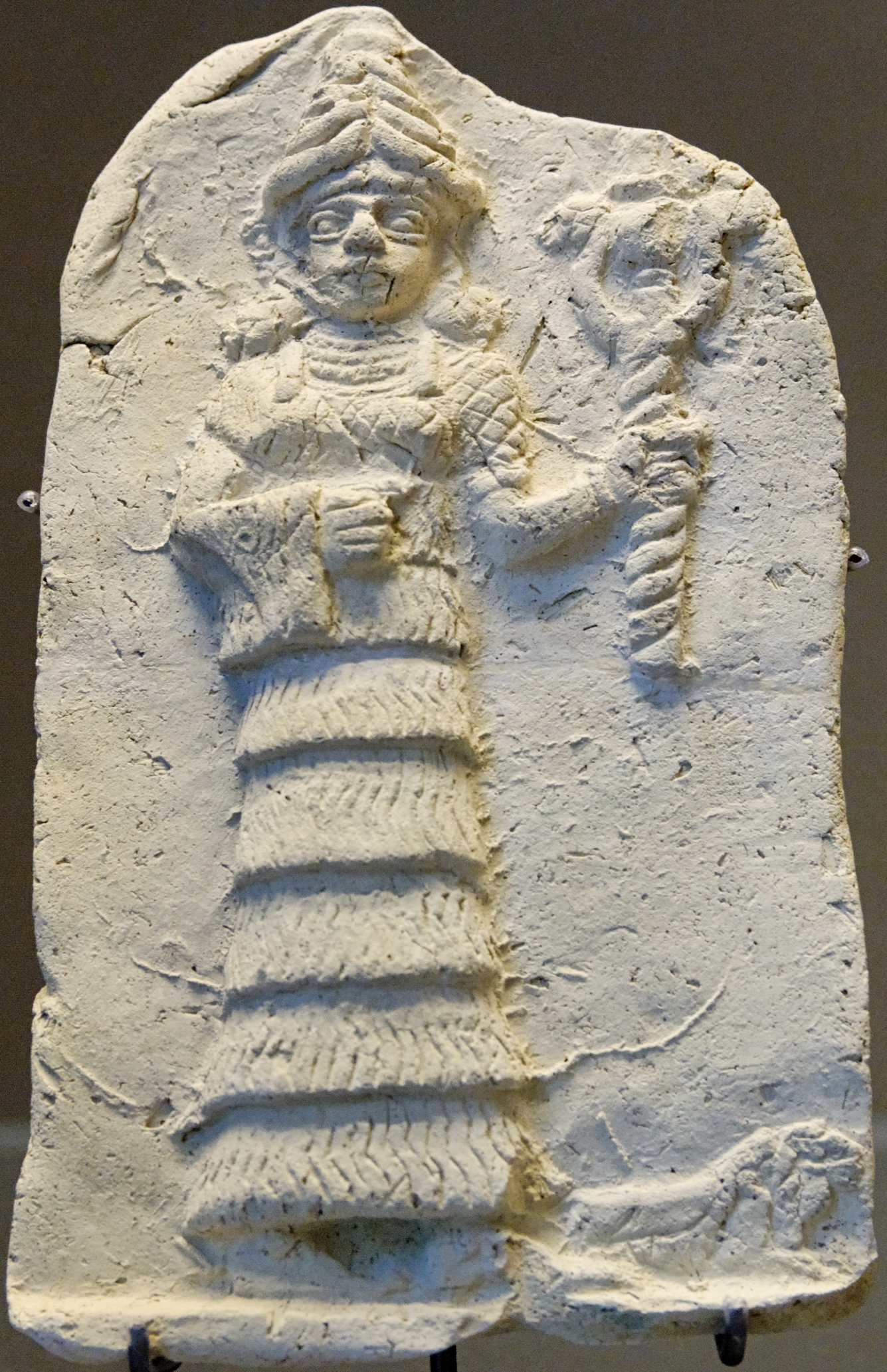
Babylonian terracotta relief of Ishtar from Eshnunna (early second millennium BCE)

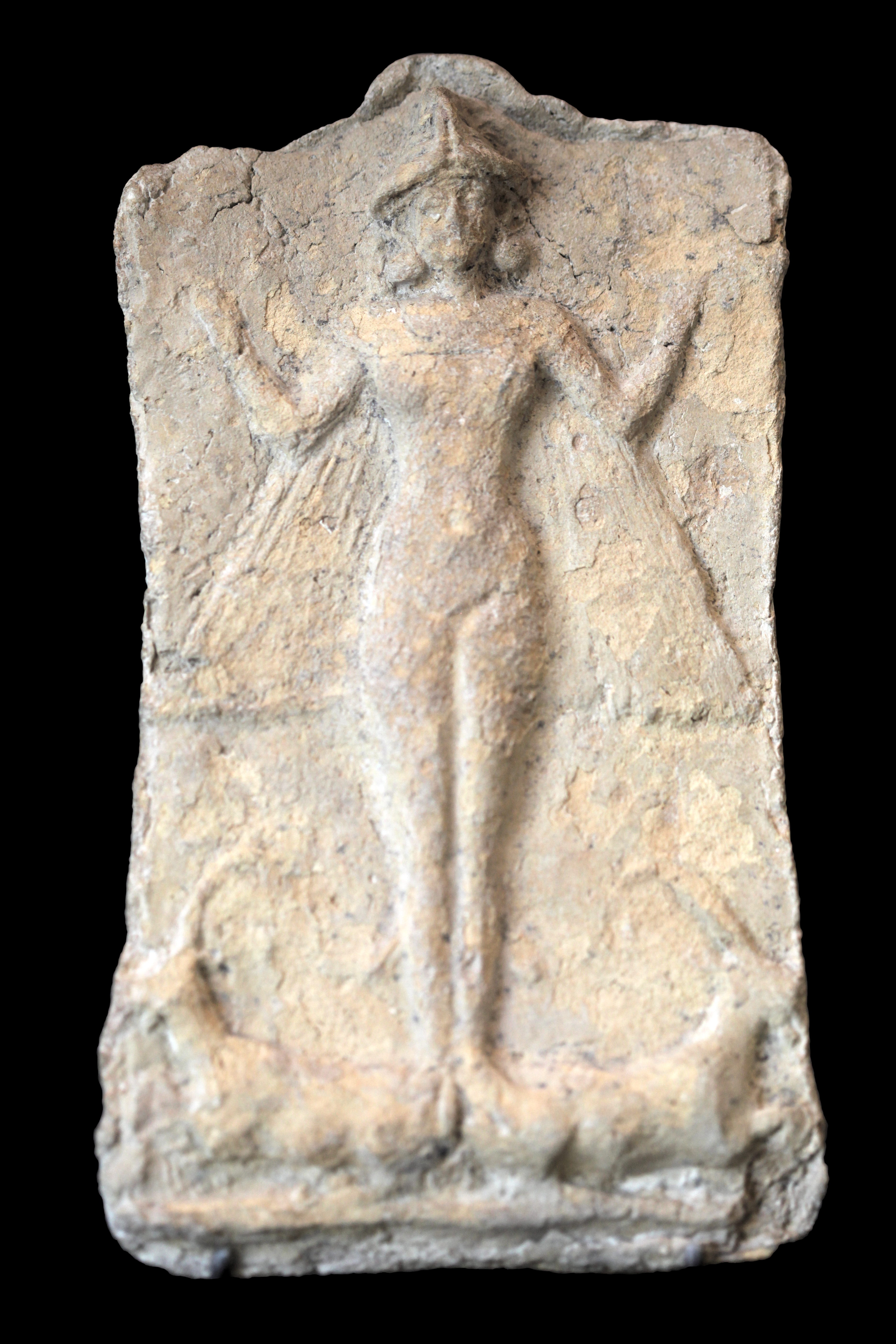
Terracotta relief of Ishtar with wings from Larsa (second millennium BCE)

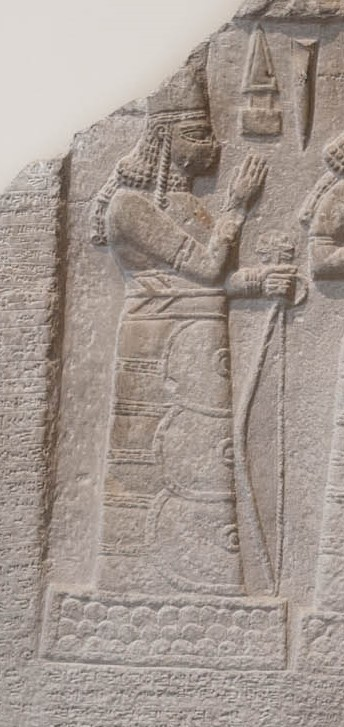
Stele showing Ishtar holding a bow from Ennigaldi-Nanna's museum (eighth century BCE)

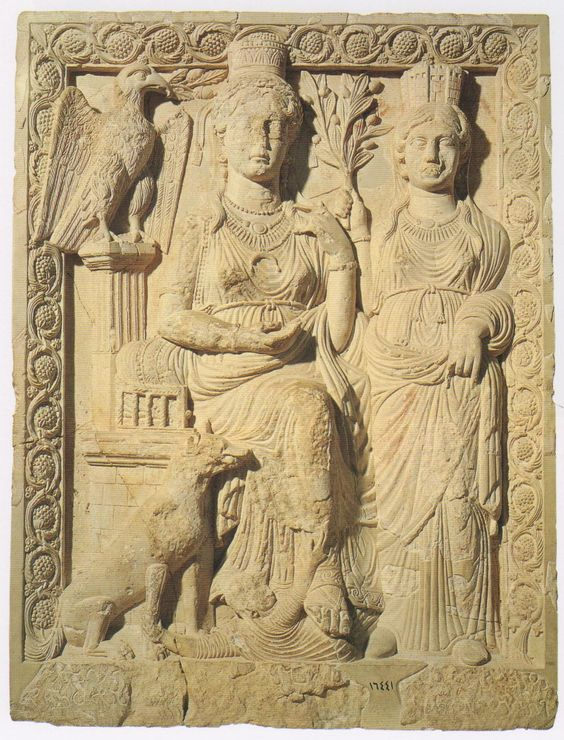
Hellenized bas-relief sculpture of Ishtar standing with her servant from Palmyra (third century CE)

== Character ==
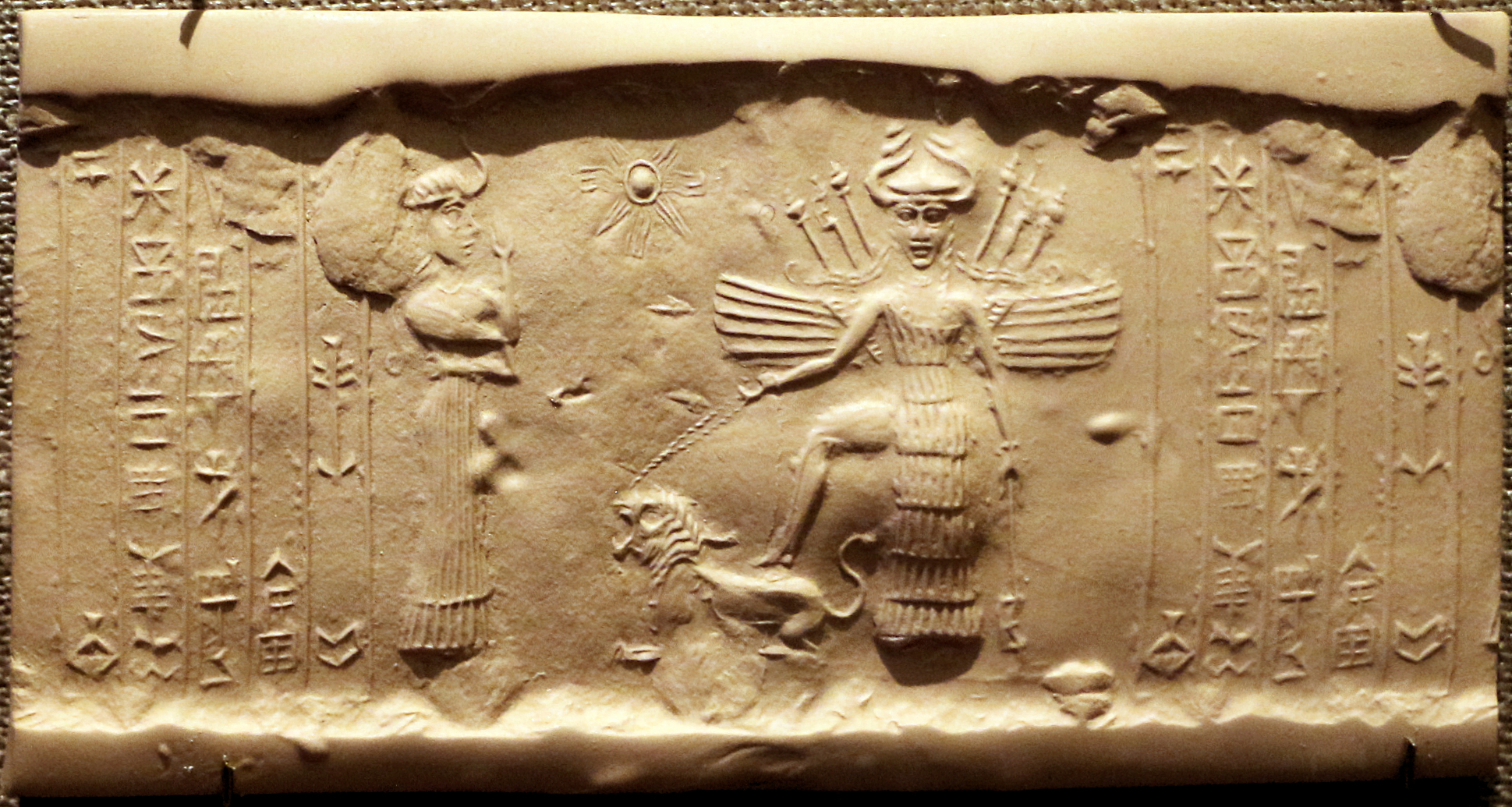
Ancient Akkadian cylinder seal depicting Inanna resting her foot on the back of a lion while Ninshubur stands in front of her paying obeisance, c. 2334–2154 BCE

The Sumerians worshipped Inanna as the goddess of both warfare and love. Unlike other gods, whose roles were static and whose domains were limited, the stories of Inanna describe her as moving from conquest to conquest. She is portrayed as young and impetuous, constantly striving for more power than had been allotted to her.

While she was worshipped as the goddess of love, Inanna was not the goddess of marriage, nor was she ever viewed as a mother goddess. Andrew R. George goes as far as stating that "According to all mythology, Ištar was not [...] temperamentally disposed" towards such functions. Julia M. Asher-Greve has even championed the significance of Inanna specifically because she is not a mother goddess. As a love goddess, she was commonly invoked by Mesopotamians in incantations. (Note: "According to Graham Cunningham (1997: p. 171) incantations are connected with 'forms of symbolic identification', and it seems obvious that symbolic identitification with some goddesses relates to their divine function or domain, e.g. ... sex and love related matters with Inana and Nanaya ... ." — J.M. Asher-Greve (2013, p. 242))

In Inanna's Descent to the Underworld, Inanna treats her lover Dumuzid in a very capricious manner. This aspect of Inanna's personality is emphasized in the later standard Akkadian version of the Epic of Gilgamesh in which Gilgamesh points out Ishtar's infamous ill-treatment of her lovers. However, according to assyriologist Dina Katz, the portrayal of Inanna's relationship with Dumuzid in the Descent myth is unusual.

Inanna was also worshipped as one of the Sumerian war deities. One of the hymns dedicated to her declares: "She stirs confusion and chaos against those who are disobedient to her, speeding carnage and inciting the devastating flood, clothed in terrifying radiance. It is her game to speed conflict and battle, untiring, strapping on her sandals." Battle itself was occasionally referred to as the "Dance of Inanna". Epithets related to lions in particular were meant to highlight this aspect of her character. As a war goddess she was sometimes referred to with the name Irnina ("victory"), though this epithet could be applied to other deities as well, in addition to functioning as a distinct goddess linked to Ningishzida rather than to Ishtar. Another epithet highlighting this aspect of Ishtar's nature was Anunitu ("the martial one"). Like Irnina, Anunitu could also be a separate deity, and as such she is first attested in documents from the Ur III period.

Assyrian royal curse-formulas invoked both of Ishtar's primary functions at once, invoking her to remove potency and martial valor alike. Mesopotamian texts indicate that traits perceived as heroic (such as a king's ability to lead his troops and to triumph over enemies) and sexual prowess were regarded as interconnected.

While generally classified as a goddess, Inanna/Ishtar could seem at times to have ambiguous gender. Gary Beckman states that "ambiguous gender identification" was a characteristic not just of Ishtar herself but of a category of deities he refers to as "Ishtar type" goddesses (such as Shaushka, Pinikir or Ninsianna). A late hymn contains the phrase "she [Ishtar] is Enlil, she is Ninil" which might be a reference to occasionally "dimorphic" character of Ishtar, in addition to serving as an exaltation. A hymn to Nanaya alludes to a male aspect of Ishtar from Babylon alongside a variety of more standard descriptions. However, Ilona Zsolnay only describes Ishtar as a "feminine figure who performed a masculine role" in certain contexts, for example as a war deity.

== Family ==
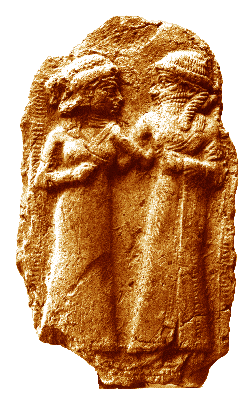
An ancient Sumerian depiction of the marriage of Inanna and Dumuzid

Inanna's twin brother was Utu (known as Shamash in Akkadian), the god of the sun and justice. In Sumerian texts, Inanna and Utu are depicted as extremely close; some modern authors even perceive their relationship as bordering on incestuous. In the myth of her descent into the underworld, Inanna addresses Ereshkigal, the queen of the underworld, as her "older sister", yet the two goddesses almost never appear together elsewhere in Sumerian literature and were not placed in the same category in god lists. In some Neo-Assyrian sources, Ishtar is also associated with Adad, with the relationship mirroring that between Shaushka and her brother Teshub in Hurrian mythology.

The most common tradition regarded Nanna and his wife Ningal as her parents. Examples of it are present in sources as diverse as a god list from the Early Dynastic period, a hymn of Ishme-Dagan relaying how Enlil and Ninlil bestowed Inanna's powers upon her, a late syncretic hymn to Nanaya, and an Akkadian ritual from Hattusa. While some authors assert that in Uruk Inanna was usually regarded as the daughter of the sky god An, it is possible that references to him as her father are only referring to his status as an ancestor of Nanna and thus his daughter. In literary texts, Enlil or Enki may be addressed as her fathers but references to major gods being "fathers" can also be examples of the use of this word as an epithet indicating seniority.

Dumuzid (later known as Tammuz), the god of shepherds, is usually described as Inanna's husband, but according to some interpretations Inanna's loyalty to him is questionable; in the myth of her descent into the Underworld, she abandons Dumuzid and permits the galla demons to drag him down into the underworld as her replacement. In a different myth, The Return of Dumuzid Inanna instead mourns over Dumuzid's death and ultimately decrees that he will be allowed to return to Heaven to be with her for one half of the year. Dina Katz notes that the portrayal of their relationship in Inanna's Descent is unusual; it does not resemble the portrayal of their relationship in other myths about Dumuzid's death, which almost never pin the blame for it on Inanna, but rather on demons or even human bandits. A large corpus of love poetry describing encounters between Inanna and Dumuzid has been assembled by researchers. However, local manifestations of Inanna/Ishtar were not necessarily associated with Dumuzid. In Kish, the tutelary deity of the city, Zababa (a war god), was viewed as the consort of a local hypostasis of Ishtar, though after the Old Babylonian period Bau, introduced from Lagash, became his spouse (an example of a couple consisting of a warrior god and a medicine goddess, common in Mesopotamian mythology) and Ishtar of Kish started to instead be worshipped on her own.

Inanna is not usually described as having any offspring; however, in the myth of Lugalbanda, as well as in a single building inscription from the Third Dynasty of Ur (c. 2112 – c. 2004 BCE), the warrior god Shara is described as her son. She was also sometimes considered the mother of Lulal, who is described in other texts as the son of Ninsun. Wilfred G. Lambert described the relation between Inanna and Lulal as "close but unspecified" in the context of Inanna's Descent. There is also similarly scarce evidence for the love goddess Nanaya being regarded as her daughter, but it is possible all of these instances merely refer to an epithet indicating closeness between the deities and were not a statement about actual parentage.

=== Sukkal ===
Inanna's sukkal was the goddess Ninshubur, whose relationship with Inanna is one of mutual devotion. In some texts, Ninshubur is listed right after Dumuzi as a member of Inanna's circle, even before some of her relatives; in one text the phrase "Ninshubur, beloved vizier" appears. In another text Ninshubur is listed even before Nanaya, originally possibly a hypostasis of Inanna herself, in a list of deities from her entourage. In an Akkadian ritual text known from Hittite archives, Ishtar's sukkal is invoked alongside her family members Sin, Ningal, and Shamash.

Other members of Inanna's entourage frequently listed in god lists are the goddesses Nanaya, Kanisurra, Gazbaba, and Bizila, all of them also associated with each other in various configurations independently from this context.

== Syncretism and influence on other deities ==
In addition to the full conflation of Inanna and Ishtar during the reign of Sargon and his successors, she was syncretised with a large number of deities to a varying degree. The oldest known syncretic hymn is dedicated to Inanna, and has been dated to the Early Dynastic period. Many god lists compiled by ancient scribes contained entire "Inanna group" sections enumerating similar goddesses, and tablet IV of the monumental god list An-Anum (7 tablets total) is known as the "Ishtar tablet" due to most of its contents being the names of Ishtar's equivalents, her titles and various attendants. Some modern researchers use the term Ishtar-type to define specific figures of this variety. Some texts contained references to "all the Ishtars" of a given area.

In later periods Ishtar's name was sometimes used as a generic term ("goddess") in Babylonia, while a logographic writing of Inanna was used to spell the title Bēltu, leading to further conflations. A possible example of such use of the name is also known from Elam, as a single Elamite inscription written in Akkadian refers to "Manzat-Ishtar", which might in this context mean "the goddess Manzat".

=== Specific examples ===
Ashtart
In cities like Mari and Ebla, the Eastern and Western Semitic forms of the name (Ishtar and Ashtart) were regarded as basically interchangeable. However, the western goddess evidently lacked the astral character of Mesopotamian Ishtar. Ugaritic god lists and ritual texts equate the local Ashtart with both Ishtar and Hurrian Ishara.
Ishara
Due to association with Ishtar, the Syrian goddess Ishara started to be regarded as a "lady of love" like her (and Nanaya) in Mesopotamia. However, in Hurro-Hittite context Ishara was associated with the underworld goddess Allani instead and additionally functioned as a goddess of oaths.
Nanaya
A goddess uniquely closely linked to Inanna, as according to assyriologist Frans Wiggermann her name was originally an epithet of Inanna (possibly serving as an appellative, "My Inanna!"). Nanaya was associated with erotic love, but she eventually developed a warlike aspect of her own too ("Nanaya Euršaba"). In Larsa Inanna's functions were effectively split between three separate figures and she was worshipped as part of a trinity consisting out of herself, Nanaya (as a love goddess) and Ninsianna (as an astral goddess). Inanna/Ishtar and Nanaya were often accidentally or intentionally conflated in poetry.
Ninegal
While she was initially an independent figure, starting with Old Babylonian period in some texts "Ninegal" is used as a title of Inanna, and in god lists she was a part of the "Inanna group" usually alongside Ninsianna. An example of the usage of "Ninegal" as an epithet can be found in the text designated as Hymn to Inana as Ninegala (Inana D) in the ETCSL.
Ninisina
A special case of syncretism was that between the medicine goddess Ninisina and Inanna, which occurred for political reasons. Isin at one point lost control over Uruk and identification of its tutelary goddess with Inanna (complete with assigning a similar warlike character to her), who served as a source of royal power, was likely meant to serve as a theological solution of this problem. As a result, in a number of sources Ninisina was regarded as analogous to similarly named Ninsianna, treated as a manifestation of Inanna. It is also possible that a ceremony of "sacred marriage" between Ninisina and the king of Isin had been performed as a result.
Ninsianna
A Venus deity of varying gender. Ninsianna was referred to as male by Rim-Sin of Larsa (who specifically used the phrase "my king") and in texts from Sippar, Ur, and Girsu, but as "Ishtar of the stars" in god lists and astronomical texts, which also applied Ishtar's epithets related to her role as a personification of Venus to this deity. In some locations Ninsianna was also known as a female deity, in which case her name can be understood as "red queen of heaven".
Pinikir
Originally an Elamite goddess, recognised in Mesopotamia, and as a result among Hurrians and Hittites, as an equivalent of Ishtar due to similar functions. She was identified specifically as her astral aspect (Ninsianna) in god lists. In a Hittite ritual she was identified by the logogram ^{d}IŠTAR and Shamash, Suen and Ningal were referred to as her family; Enki and Ishtar's sukkal were invoked in it as well. In Elam she was a goddess of love and sex and a heavenly deity ("mistress of heaven"). Due to syncretism with Ishtar and Ninsianna Pinikir was referred to as both a female and male deity in Hurro-Hittite sources.
Šauška
Her name was frequently written with the logogram ^{d}IŠTAR in Hurrian and Hittite sources, while Mesopotamian texts recognised her under the name "Ishtar of Subartu". Some elements peculiar to her were associated with the Assyrian hypostasis of Ishtar, Ishtar of Nineveh, in later times. Her handmaidens Ninatta and Kulitta were incorporated into the circle of deities believed to serve Ishtar in her temple in Ashur.

== Sumerian texts ==
=== Origin myths ===
The poem Enki and the World Order (ETCSL 1.1.3) begins by describing the god Enki and his establishment of the cosmic organization of the universe. Towards the end of the poem, Inanna comes to Enki and complains that he has assigned a domain and special powers to all of the other gods except for her. She declares that she has been treated unfairly. Enki responds by telling her that she already has a domain and that he does not need to assign her one.

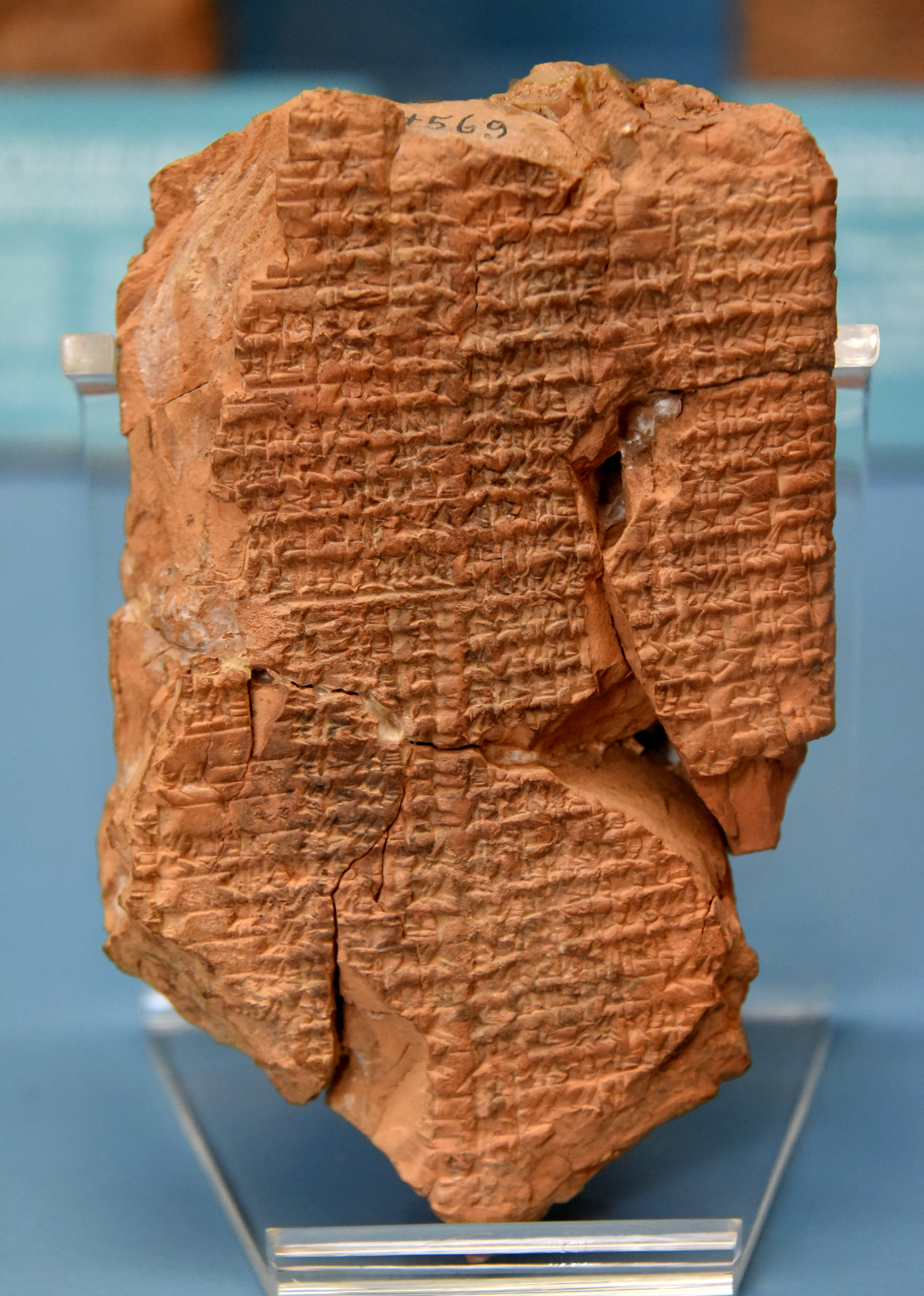
Original Sumerian tablet of the Courtship of Inanna and Dumuzid

The myth of "Inanna and the Huluppu Tree", found in the preamble to the epic of Gilgamesh, Enkidu, and the Netherworld (ETCSL 1.8.1.4), centers around a young Inanna, not yet stable in her power. It begins with a huluppu tree, which Kramer identifies as possibly a willow, growing on the banks of the river Euphrates. Inanna moves the tree to her garden in Uruk with the intention to carve it into a throne once it is fully grown. The tree grows and matures, but the serpent "who knows no charm", the Anzû-bird, and Lilitu (Ki-Sikil-Lil-La-Ke in Sumerian), seen by some as the Sumerian forerunner to the Lilith of Jewish folklore, all take up residence within the tree, causing Inanna to cry with sorrow. The hero Gilgamesh, who, in this story, is portrayed as her brother, comes along and slays the serpent, causing the Anzû-bird and Lilitu to flee. Gilgamesh's companions chop down the tree and carve its wood into a bed and a throne, which they give to Inanna, who fashions a pikku and a mikku (probably a drum and drumsticks respectively, although the exact identifications are uncertain), which she gives to Gilgamesh as a reward for his heroism.

The poem Inanna Prefers the Farmer (ETCSL 4.0.8.3.3) begins with a rather playful conversation between Inanna and Utu, who incrementally reveals to her that it is time for her to marry. She is courted by a farmer named Enkimdu and a shepherd named Dumuzid. At first, Inanna prefers the farmer, but Utu and Dumuzid gradually persuade her that Dumuzid is the better choice for a husband, arguing that, for every gift the farmer can give to her, the shepherd can give her something even better. In the end, Inanna marries Dumuzid. The shepherd and the farmer reconcile their differences, offering each other gifts. Samuel Noah Kramer compares the myth to the later Biblical story of Cain and Abel because both myths center around a farmer and a shepherd competing for divine favor and, in both stories, the deity in question ultimately chooses the shepherd.

=== Conquests and patronage ===
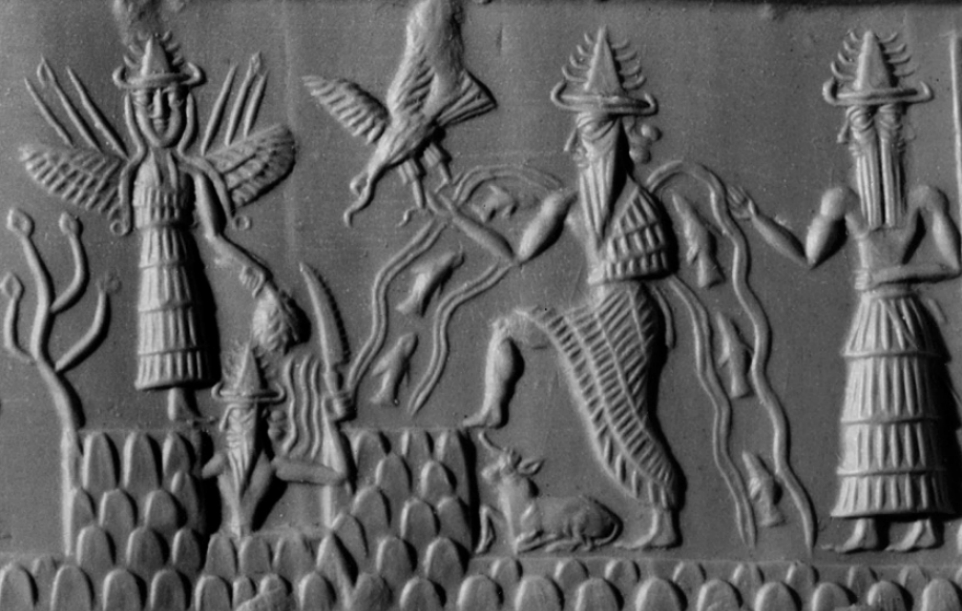
Akkadian cylinder seal from c. 2300 BCE or thereabouts depicting the deities Inanna, Utu, Enki, and Isimud

Inanna and Enki (ETCSL t.1.3.1) is a lengthy poem written in Sumerian, which may date to the Third Dynasty of Ur (c. 2112 BCE – c. 2004 BCE); it tells the story of how Inanna stole the sacred mes from Enki, the god of water and human culture. In ancient Sumerian mythology, the mes were sacred powers or properties belonging to the gods that allowed human civilization to exist. Each me embodied one specific aspect of human culture. These aspects were very diverse and the mes listed in the poem include abstract concepts such as Truth, Victory, and Counsel, technologies such as writing and weaving, and also social constructs such as law, priestly offices, kingship, and prostitution. The mes were believed to grant power over all the aspects of civilization, both positive and negative.

In the myth, Inanna travels from her own city of Uruk to Enki's city of Eridu, where she visits his temple, the E-Abzu. Inanna is greeted by Enki's sukkal, Isimud, who offers her food and drink. Inanna starts up a drinking competition with Enki. Then, once Enki is thoroughly intoxicated, Inanna persuades him to give her the mes. Inanna flees from Eridu in the Boat of Heaven, taking the mes back with her to Uruk. Enki wakes up to discover that the mes are gone and asks Isimud what has happened to them. Isimud replies that Enki has given all of them to Inanna. Enki becomes infuriated and sends multiple sets of fierce monsters after Inanna to take back the mes before she reaches the city of Uruk. Inanna's sukkal Ninshubur fends off all of the monsters that Enki sends after them. Through Ninshubur's aid, Inanna successfully manages to take the mes back with her to the city of Uruk. After Inanna escapes, Enki reconciles with her and bids her a positive farewell. It is possible that this legend may represent a historic transfer of power from the city of Eridu to the city of Uruk. It is also possible that this legend may be a symbolic representation of Inanna's maturity and her readiness to become the Queen of Heaven.

The poem Inanna Takes Command of Heaven is an extremely fragmentary, but important, account of Inanna's conquest of the Eanna temple in Uruk. It begins with a conversation between Inanna and her brother Utu in which Inanna laments that the Eanna temple is not within their domain and resolves to claim it as her own. The text becomes increasingly fragmentary at this point in the narrative, but appears to describe her difficult passage through a marshland to reach the temple while a fisherman instructs her on which route is best to take. Ultimately, Inanna reaches her father An, who is shocked by her arrogance, but nevertheless concedes that she has succeeded and that the temple is now her domain. The text ends with a hymn expounding Inanna's greatness. This myth may represent an eclipse in the authority of the priests of An in Uruk and a transfer of power to the priests of Inanna. Beside the epic text, the descent of the Eanna from heaven is mentioned in the story of Gilgameš and Akka (line 31) as well as the Sumerian Temple hymns and the bilingual text The Exaltation of Inanna/Ištar.

Inanna briefly appears at the beginning and end of the epic poem Enmerkar and the Lord of Aratta (ETCSL 1.8.2.3). The epic deals with a rivalry between the cities of Uruk and Aratta. Enmerkar, the king of Uruk, wishes to adorn his city with jewels and precious metals, but cannot do so because such minerals are only found in Aratta and, since trade does not yet exist, the resources are not available to him. Inanna, who is the patron goddess of both cities, appears to Enmerkar at the beginning of the poem and tells him that she favors Uruk over Aratta. She instructs Enmerkar to send a messenger to the lord of Aratta to ask for the resources Uruk needs. The majority of the epic revolves around a great contest between the two kings over Inanna's favor. Inanna reappears at the end of the poem to resolve the conflict by telling Enmerkar to establish trade between his city and Aratta.

=== Justice myths ===
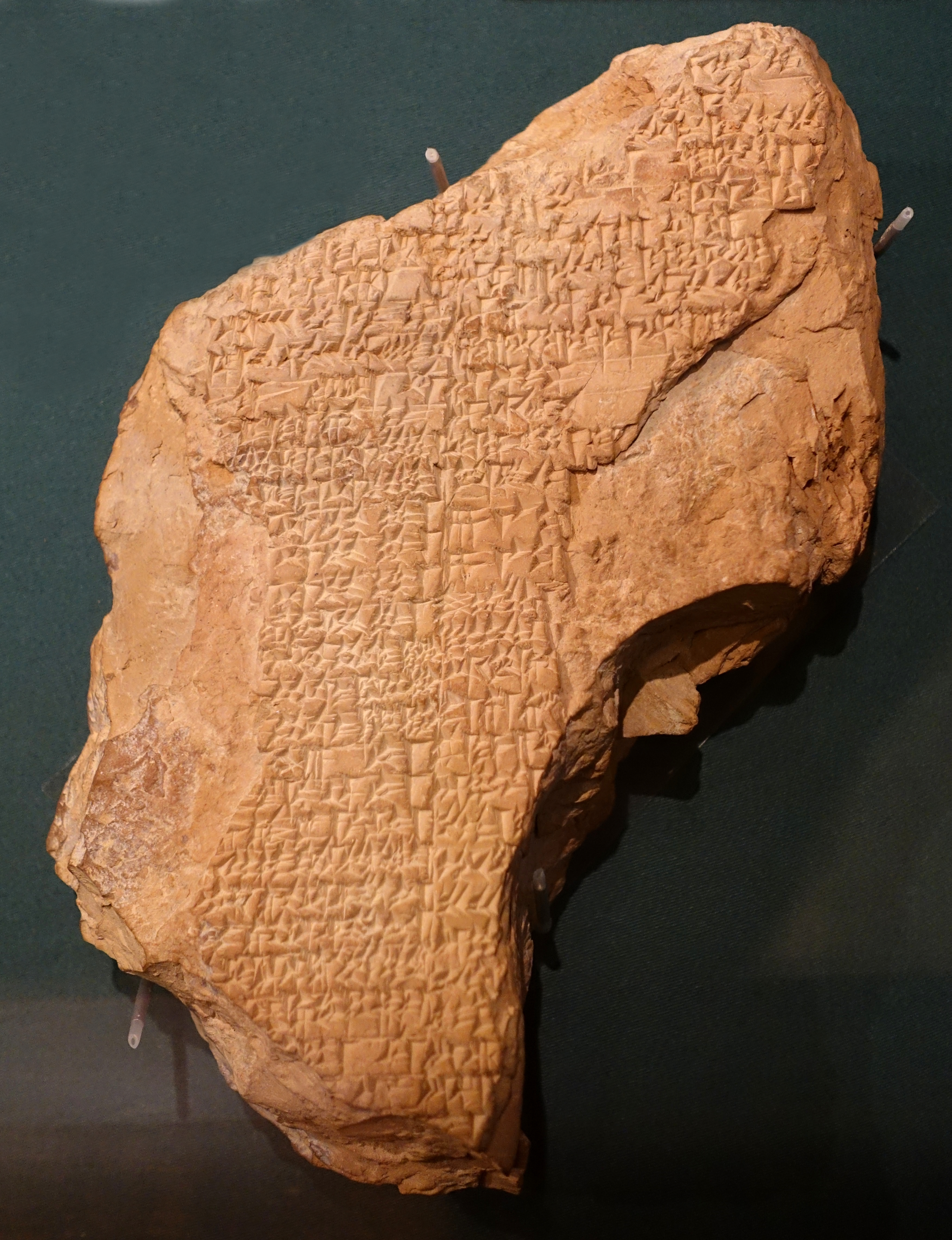
The original Sumerian clay tablet of Inanna and Ebih, which is currently housed in the Oriental Institute at the University of Chicago

Inanna and her brother Utu were regarded as the dispensers of divine justice, a role which Inanna exemplifies in several of her myths. Inanna and Ebih (ETCSL 1.3.2), otherwise known as Goddess of the Fearsome Divine Powers, is a 184-line poem written by the Akkadian poet Enheduanna describing Inanna's confrontation with Mount Ebih, a mountain in the Zagros mountain range. The poem begins with an introductory hymn praising Inanna. The goddess journeys all over the entire world, until she comes across Mount Ebih and becomes infuriated by its glorious might and natural beauty, considering its very existence as an outright affront to her own authority. She rails at Mount Ebih, shouting:

Mountain, because of your elevation, because of your height,
Because of your goodness, because of your beauty,
Because you wore a holy garment,
Because An organized(?) you,
Because you did not bring (your) nose close to the ground,
Because you did not press (your) lips in the dust.

Inanna petitions to An, the Sumerian god of the heavens, to allow her to destroy Mount Ebih. An warns Inanna not to attack the mountain, but she ignores his warning and proceeds to attack and destroy Mount Ebih regardless. In the conclusion of the myth, she explains to Mount Ebih why she attacked it. In Sumerian poetry, the phrase "destroyer of Kur" is occasionally used as one of Inanna's epithets. According to Annette Zgoll, in this text Inanna represents the expansive conquest policy of the Akkadian empire, while the reluctant behaviour of the god An represents the perspective of the land of Sumer and its inhabitants, who had to suffer under the Sargonid invasions. The rebellion of the mountain of Ebiḫ and its destruction by Inanna is also mentioned in the hymn Innin ša gura ("Mistress of the Great Heart"), which is ascribed to the high priestess En-ḫedu-ana.

The poem Inanna and Shukaletuda (ETCSL 1.3.3) begins with a hymn to Inanna, praising her as the planet Venus. It then introduces Shukaletuda, a gardener who is terrible at his job. All of his plants die, except for one poplar tree. Shukaletuda prays to the gods for guidance in his work. To his surprise, the goddess Inanna sees his one poplar tree and decides to rest under the shade of its branches. Shukaletuda removes her clothes and rapes Inanna while she sleeps. When the goddess wakes up and realizes she has been violated, she becomes furious and determines to bring her attacker to justice. In a fit of rage, Inanna unleashes horrible plagues upon the Earth, turning water into blood. Shukaletuda, terrified for his life, pleads his father for advice on how to escape Inanna's wrath. His father tells him to hide in the city, amongst the hordes of people, where he will hopefully blend in. Inanna searches the mountains of the East for her attacker, but is not able to find him. She then releases a series of storms and closes all roads to the city, but is still unable to find Shukaletuda, so she asks Enki to help her find him, threatening to leave her temple in Uruk if he does not. Enki consents and Inanna flies "across the sky like a rainbow". Inanna finally locates Shukaletuda, who vainly attempts to invent excuses for his crime against her. Inanna rejects these excuses and kills him. Theology professor Jeffrey Cooley has cited the story of Shukaletuda as a Sumerian astral myth, arguing that the movements of Inanna in the story correspond with the movements of the planet Venus. He has also stated that, while Shukaletuda was praying to the goddess, he may have been looking toward Venus on the horizon.

The text of the poem Inanna and Bilulu (ETCSL 1.4.4), discovered at Nippur, is badly mutilated and scholars have interpreted it in a number of different ways. The beginning of the poem is mostly destroyed, but seems to be a lament. The intelligible part of the poem describes Inanna pining after her husband Dumuzid, who is in the steppe watching his flocks. Inanna sets out to find him. After this, a large portion of the text is missing. When the story resumes, Inanna is being told that Dumuzid has been murdered. Inanna discovers that the old bandit woman Bilulu and her son Girgire are responsible. She travels along the road to Edenlila and stops at an inn, where she finds the two murderers. Inanna stands on top of a stool and transforms Bilulu into "the waterskin that men carry in the desert", forcing her to pour the funerary libations for Dumuzid.

=== Inanna as a goddess of sex ===
Many myths reference or explore Inanna as a sexual and/or romantic goddess. A brief example is found in A shir-namshub to Utu (Utu F), wherein a young Inanna says to Utu, "My brother, awe-inspiring lord, let me ride with you to the mountains! . . . I am unfamiliar with womanly matters, with sexual intercourse! I am unfamiliar with womanly matters, with kissing!"

== Descent into the underworld ==
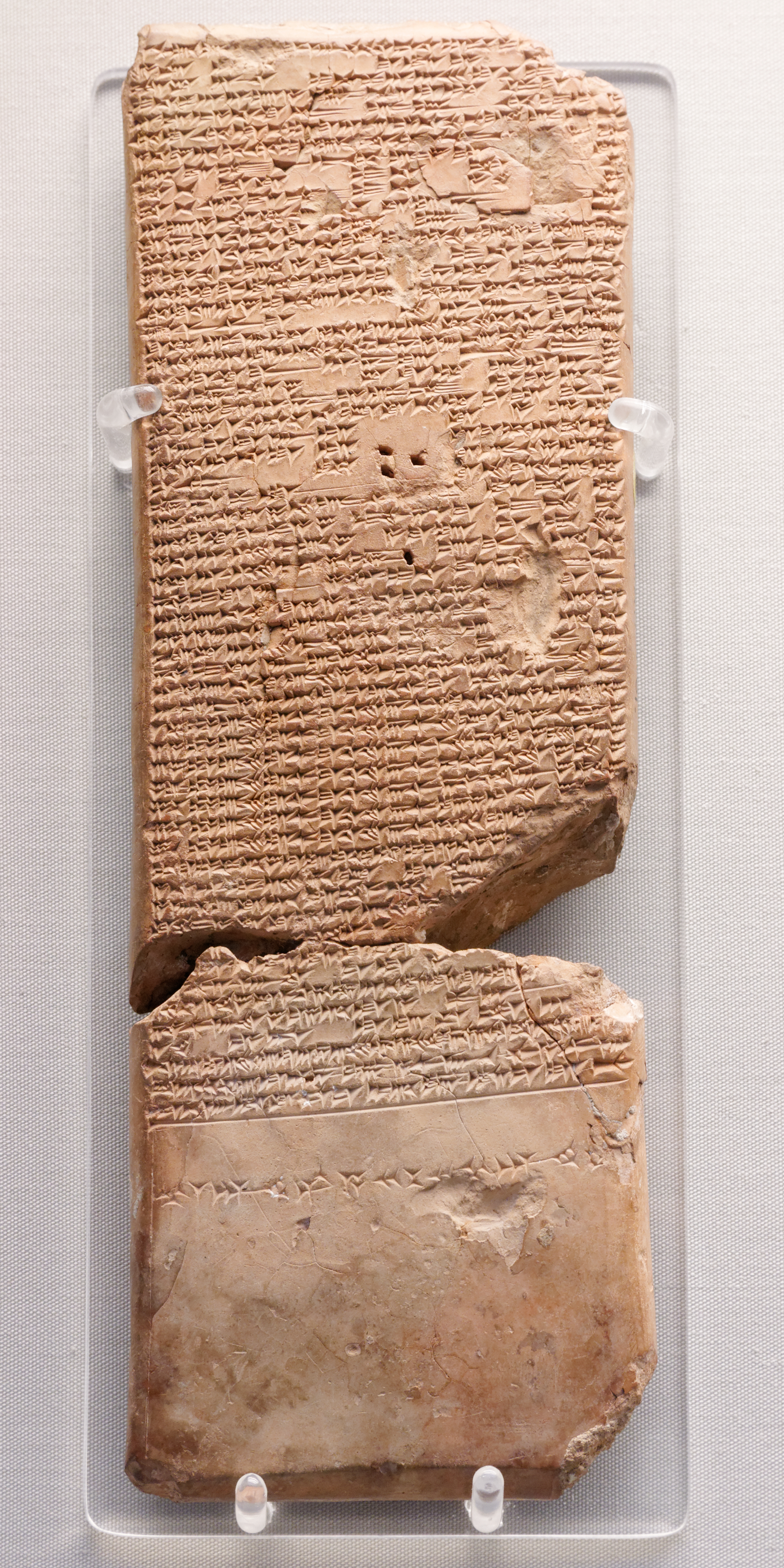
Copy of the Akkadian version of Ishtar's Descent into the Underworld from the Library of Assurbanipal, currently held in the British Museum in London, England

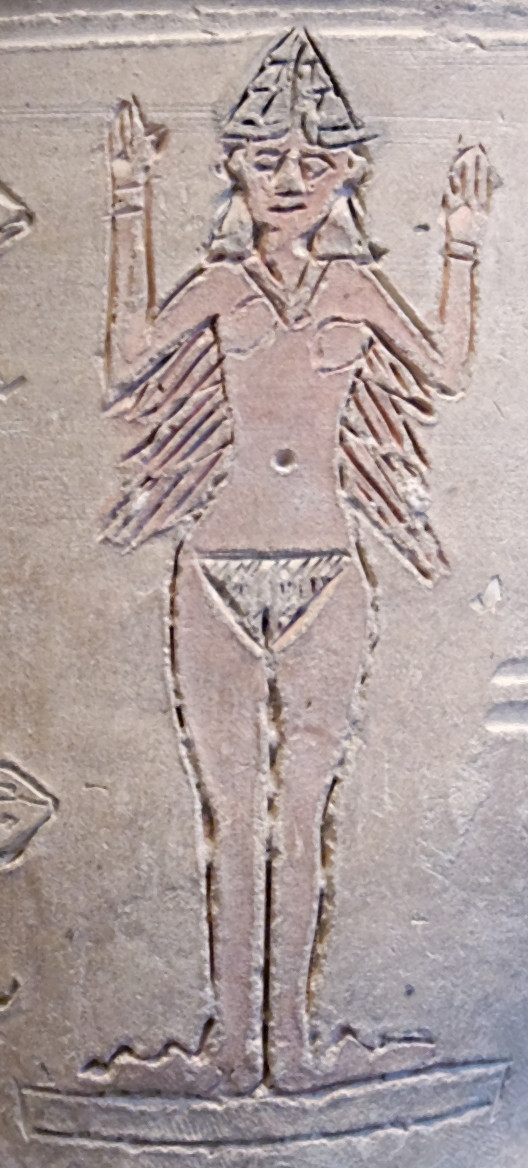
Depiction of Inanna/Ishtar from the Ishtar Vase, dating to the early second millennium BCE (Mesopotamian, terracotta with cut, moulded, and painted decoration, from Larsa)

Two different versions of the story of Inanna/Ishtar's descent into the underworld have survived: a Sumerian version dating to the Third Dynasty of Ur (c. 2112 BCE – 2004 BCE) (ETCSL 1.4.1) and a clearly derivative Akkadian version from the early second millennium BCE. (Note: Brandão 2019 disagrees that the Akkadian poem only summarizes or distorts the Sumerian poem, although there is no doubt of the intertextual relations.) The Sumerian version of the story is nearly three times the length of the later Akkadian version and contains much greater detail.

Various other texts refer to the myth of Inanna's descent as well, including the tale of Inanna and Šukaletuda. Already in the first cuneiform texts of late 4th millennium Uruk period, the divine name Inanna-kur "Inanna (of the) netherworld" is attested, which probably refers to the underworld passage and thus makes it probably the oldest reliably attested myth of mankind.

=== Sumerian version ===
In Sumerian religion, the Kur or underworld was ruled by the goddess Ereshkigal, the "sister" of Inanna. The text itself does not explicitly state the motivation of Inanna's descent. However, hylistic myth research could show that at least one variant of the myth processed in the text relates to Inanna demanding the me (i.e. rituals (Note: After being discussed for a long time the meaning of me has now been clarified as 'rituals' by Annette Zgoll (2025, p. 145-149).)) of the netherworld, in which she finally succeeds.

Before leaving, Inanna instructs her minister and servant Ninshubur to plead with the deities Enlil, Nanna, An, and Enki to rescue her if she does not return after three days. The laws of the underworld dictate that, with the exception of appointed messengers, those who enter it may never leave. Inanna dresses elaborately for the visit; she wears a turban, wig, lapis lazuli necklace, beads upon her breast, the 'pala dress' (the ladyship garment), mascara, a pectoral, and golden ring, and holds a lapis lazuli measuring rod. Each garment is a representation of a powerful me she possesses.

Inanna pounds on the gates of the underworld, demanding to be let in. The gatekeeper Neti asks her why she has come and Inanna replies that she wishes to attend the funeral rites of Gugalanna, the "husband of my elder sister Ereshkigal". Neti reports this to Ereshkigal, who tells him: "Bolt the seven gates of the underworld. Then, one by one, open each gate a crack. Let Inanna enter. As she enters, remove her royal garments." Perhaps Inanna's garments, unsuitable for a funeral, along with Inanna's haughty behavior, make Ereshkigal suspicious. Following Ereshkigal's instructions, Neti tells Inanna she may enter the first gate of the underworld, but she must hand over her lapis lazuli measuring rod. She asks why, and is told, "It is just the ways of the underworld." She obliges and passes through. Inanna passes through a total of seven gates, at each one removing a piece of clothing or jewelry she had been wearing at the start of her journey, thus stripping her of her power. When she arrives in front of her sister, she is naked:

After she had crouched down and had her clothes removed, they were carried away. Then she made her sister Erec-ki-gala rise from her throne, and instead she sat on her throne. The Anna, the seven judges, rendered their decision against her. They looked at her – it was the look of death. They spoke to her – it was the speech of anger. They shouted at her – it was the shout of heavy guilt. The afflicted woman was turned into a corpse. And the corpse was hung on a hook.

Three days and three nights pass, and Ninshubur, following instructions, goes to the temples of Enlil, Nanna, An, and Enki, and pleads with each of them to rescue Inanna. The first three deities refuse, saying Inanna's fate is her own fault, but Enki is deeply troubled and agrees to help. He creates two sexless figures named gala-tura and the kur-jara from the dirt under the fingernails of two of his fingers. He instructs them to appease Ereshkigal and, when she asks them what they want, ask for the corpse of Inanna, which they must sprinkle with the food and water of life. When they come before Ereshkigal, she is in agony like a woman giving birth. She offers them whatever they want, including life-giving rivers of water and fields of grain, if they can relieve her, but they refuse all of her offers and ask only for Inanna's corpse. The gala-tura and the kur-jara sprinkle Inanna's corpse with the food and water of life and revive her.

The Sumerian text connects the myth of Inanna's descent with one variant of the myth concerning the death of Dumuzi: Galla demons sent by Ereshkigal follow Inanna out of the underworld, insisting that someone else must be taken to the underworld as Inanna's replacement. They first come upon Ninshubur and attempt to take her, but Inanna stops them, insisting that Ninshubur is her loyal servant and that she had rightfully mourned for her while she was in the underworld. They next come upon Shara, Inanna's beautician, who is still in mourning. The demons attempt to take him, but Inanna insists that they may not, because he had also mourned for her. The third person they come upon is Lulal, who is also in mourning. The demons try to take him, but Inanna stops them once again.

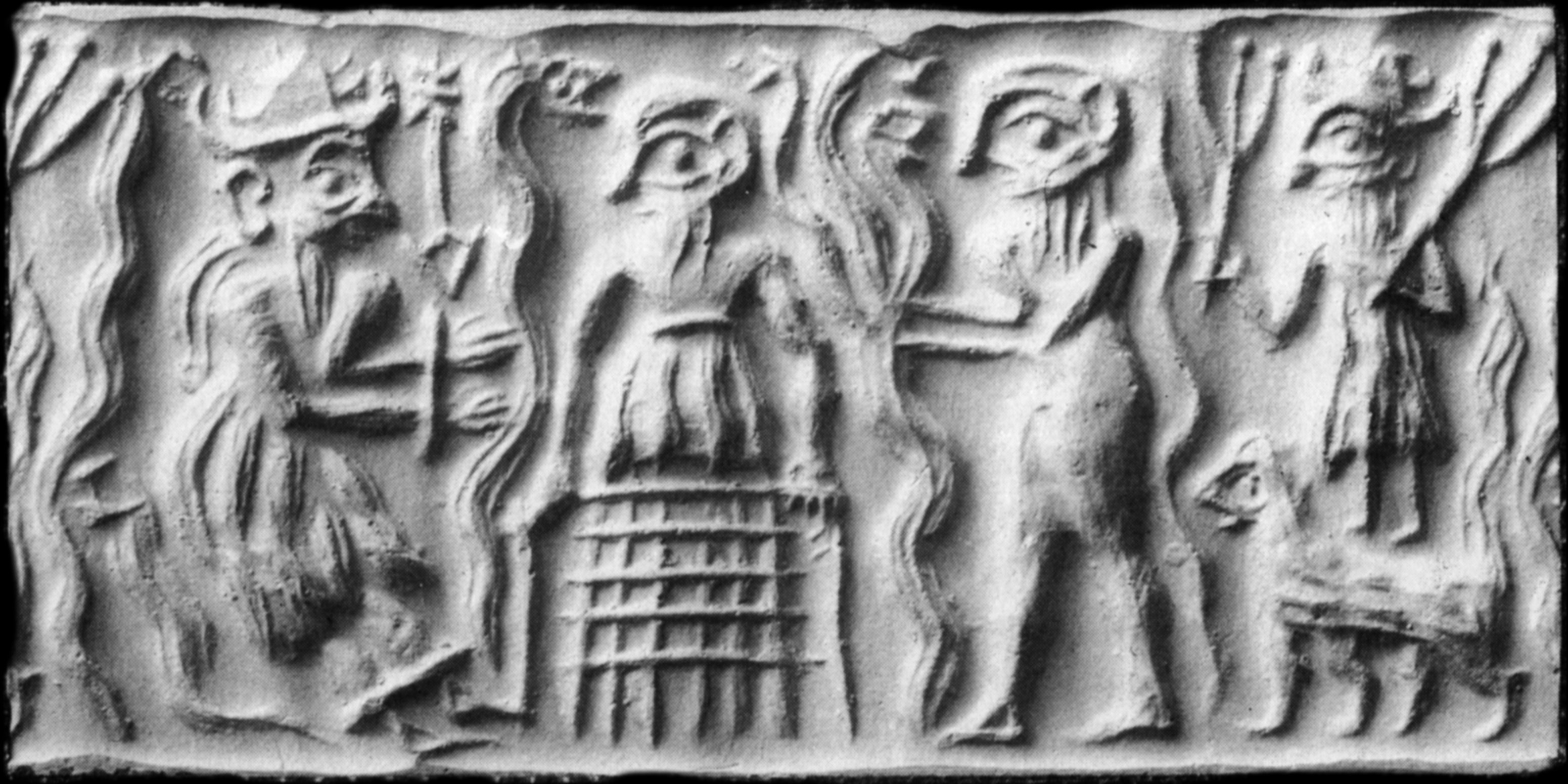
Ancient Sumerian cylinder seal impression showing Dumuzid being tortured in the underworld by the galla demons

Finally, they come upon Dumuzi, Inanna's husband. Despite Inanna's fate, and in contrast to the other individuals who were properly mourning her, Dumuzi is lavishly clothed and resting beneath a tree, or upon her throne, entertained by slave-girls. Inanna, displeased, decrees that the galla shall take him. The galla then drag Dumuzi down to the underworld.

Another text known as Dumuzi's Dream (ETCSL 1.4.3) describes Dumuzi's repeated attempts to evade capture by the galla demons, an effort in which he is aided by the sun-god Utu. (Note: Dumuzid's Dream is attested in seventy-five known sources, fifty-five of which come from Nippur, nine from Ur, three probably from the region around Sippar, one each from Uruk, Kish, Shaduppum, and Susa.) In the Sumerian poem The Return of Dumuzid, which begins where The Dream of Dumuzid ends, Dumuzid's sister Geshtinanna laments continually for days and nights over Dumuzid's death, joined by Inanna, who has apparently experienced a change of heart, and Sirtur, Dumuzid's mother. The three goddesses mourn continually until a fly reveals to Inanna the location of her husband. Together, Inanna and Geshtinanna go to the place where the fly has told them they will find Dumuzid. They find him there and Inanna decrees that, from that point onwards, Dumuzid will spend half of the year with her sister Ereshkigal in the underworld and the other half of the year in Heaven with her, while his sister Geshtinanna takes his place in the underworld.

=== Akkadian version ===
This version had two manuscripts found in the Library of Ashurbanipal and a third was found in Asshur, all dating from the first half of the first millennium before the common era. Of the Ninevite version, the first cuneiform version was published in 1873 by François Lenormant, and the transliterated version was published by Peter Jensen in 1901. Its title in Akkadian is Ana Kurnugê, qaqqari la târi.

The Akkadian version begins with Ishtar approaching the gates of the underworld and demanding the gatekeeper to let her in:

If you do not open the gate for me to come in,
I shall smash the door and shatter the bolt,
I shall smash the doorpost and overturn the doors,
I shall raise up the dead and they shall eat the living:
And the dead shall outnumber the living!

The gatekeeper (whose name is not given in the Akkadian version) hurries to tell Ereshkigal of Ishtar's arrival. Ereshkigal orders him to let Ishtar enter, but tells him to "treat her according to the ancient rites". The gatekeeper lets Ishtar into the underworld, opening one gate at a time. At each gate, Ishtar is forced to shed one article of clothing. When she finally passes the seventh gate, she is naked. In a rage, Ishtar throws herself at Ereshkigal, but Ereshkigal orders her servant Namtar to imprison Ishtar and unleash sixty diseases against her.

After Ishtar descends to the underworld, all sexual activity ceases on earth. The god Papsukkal, the Akkadian counterpart to Ninshubur, reports the situation to Ea, the god of wisdom and culture. Ea creates an androgynous being called Asu-shu-namir and sends them to Ereshkigal, telling them to invoke "the name of the great gods" against her and to ask for the bag containing the waters of life. Ereshkigal becomes enraged when she hears Asu-shu-namir's demand, but she is forced to give them the water of life. Asu-shu-namir sprinkles Ishtar with this water, reviving her. Then, Ishtar passes back through the seven gates, receiving one article of clothing back at each gate, and exiting the final gate fully clothed. But Ištar must provide a substitute for her return to the world of the living, namely her husband Dumuzi. His sister Belili, however, takes part of the punishment upon herself, so that from now on they take turns in the underworld. Together with Dumuzi, the other dead are now allowed to leave the underworld on certain days as well – thus Ištar's descent into the underworld has created an opportunity for people to make contact with the dead, thus founding a religious holiday.

=== Interpretations in modern assyriology ===
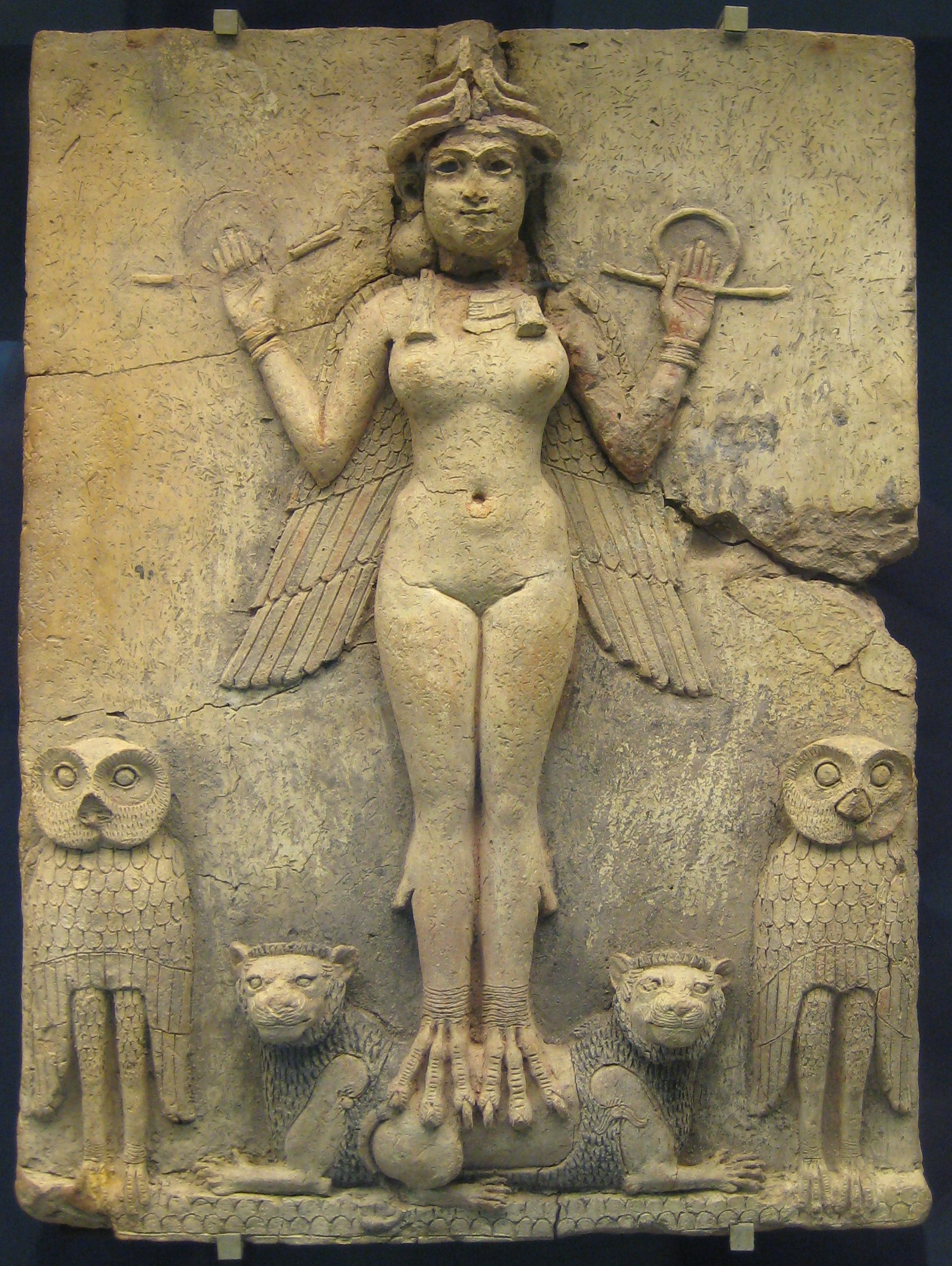
The "Burney Relief", which is speculated to represent either Ishtar or her older sister Ereshkigal (c. 19th or 18th century BCE)

Dina Katz, an authority on Sumerian afterlife beliefs and funerary customs, considers the narrative of Inanna's descent to be a combination of two distinct preexisting traditions rooted in broader context of Mesopotamian religion.

In one tradition, Inanna was only able to leave the underworld with the help of Enki's trick, with no mention of the possibility of finding a substitute. This part of the myth belongs to the genre of myths about deities struggling to obtain power, glory etc. (such as Lugal-e or Enuma Elish), and possibly served as a representation of Inanna's character as a personification of a periodically vanishing astral body. According to Katz, the fact that Inanna's instructions to Ninshubur contain a correct prediction of her eventual fate, including the exact means of her rescue, show that the purpose of this composition was simply highlighting Inanna's ability to traverse both the heavens and the underworld, much like how Venus was able to rise over and over again. She also points out Inanna's return has parallels in some Udug-hul incantations.

Another was simply one of the many myths about the death of Dumuzi (such as Dumuzi's Dream or Inana and Bilulu; in these myths Inanna is not to blame for his death), tied to his role as an embodiment of vegetation. She considers it possible that the connection between the two parts of the narrative was meant to mirror some well attested healing rituals which required a symbolic substitute of the person being treated.

Katz also notes that the Sumerian version of the myth is not concerned with matters of fertility, and points out any references to it (e.g. to nature being infertile while Ishtar is dead) were only added in later Akkadian translations; so was the description of Tammuz's funeral. The purpose of these changes was likely to make the myth closer to cultic traditions linked to Tammuz, namely the annual mourning of his death followed by celebration of a temporary return. According to Katz it is notable that known many copies of the later versions of the myth come from Assyrian cities which were known for their veneration of Tammuz, such as Ashur and Nineveh.

=== Other interpretations ===
A number of less scholarly interpretations of the myth arose through the 20th century, many of them rooted in the tradition of Jungian analysis rather than assyriology. Some authors draw comparisons to the Greek myth of the abduction of Persephone as well.

Monica Otterrmann performed a feminist interpretation of the myth, questioning its interpretation as related to the cycle of nature, claiming that the narratives represent that Inanna's powers were being restricted by the Mesopotamian patriarchy, due to the fact that, according to her, the region was not conducive to fertility. Brandão questions this idea in part, for although Inanna's power is at stake in the Sumerian text, in the Akkadian text the goddess' relationship to fertility and fertilization is at stake. Furthermore, in the Sumerian text Inanna's power is not limited by a man, but by another equally powerful goddess, Ereskigal.

== Later myths ==
=== Epic of Gilgamesh ===
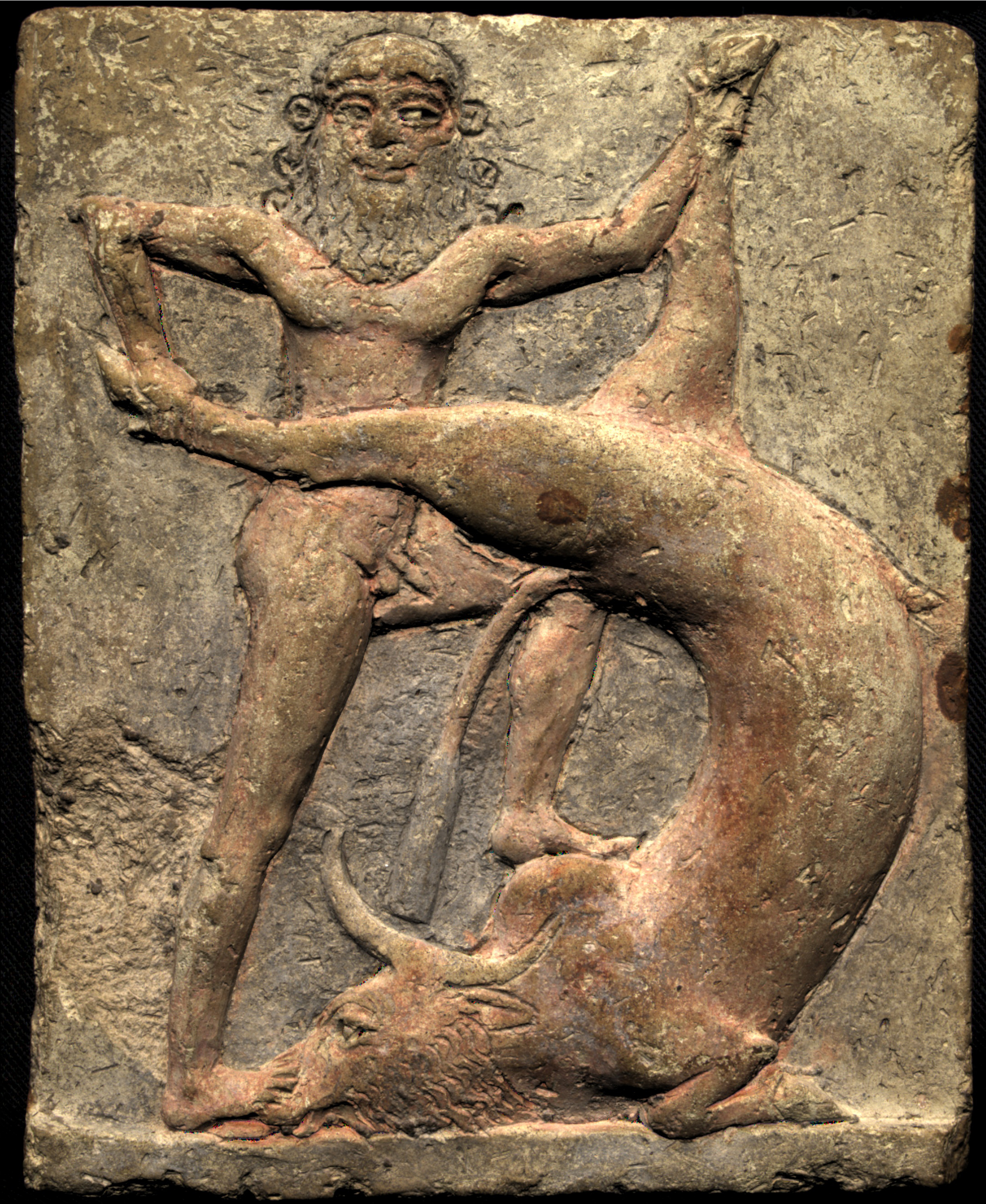
Ancient Mesopotamian terracotta relief showing Gilgamesh slaying the Bull of Heaven, sent by Ishtar in Tablet VI of the Epic of Gilgamesh after he spurns her amorous advances

In the Akkadian Epic of Gilgamesh, Ishtar appears to Gilgamesh after he and his companion Enkidu have returned to Uruk from defeating the ogre Humbaba and demands Gilgamesh to become her consort. (Note: Abush proposes the thesis that Ishtar's proposal would be for Gilgamesh to become a worker in the world of the dead.) Gilgamesh refuses her, pointing out that all of her previous lovers have suffered:

Listen to me while I tell the tale of your lovers. There was Tammuz, the lover of your youth, for him you decreed wailing, year after year. You loved the many-coloured Lilac-breasted Roller, but still you struck and broke his wing [...] You have loved the lion tremendous in strength: seven pits you dug for him, and seven. You have loved the stallion magnificent in battle, and for him you decreed the whip and spur and a thong [...] You have loved the shepherd of the flock; he made meal-cake for you day after day, he killed kids for your sake. You struck and turned him into a wolf; now his own herd-boys chase him away, his own hounds worry his flanks.

Infuriated by Gilgamesh's refusal, Ishtar goes to heaven and tells her father Anu that Gilgamesh has insulted her. Anu asks her why she is complaining to him instead of confronting Gilgamesh herself. Ishtar demands that Anu give her the Bull of Heaven and swears that if he does not give it to her, she will "break in the doors of hell and smash the bolts; there will be confusion [i.e., mixing] of people, those above with those from the lower depths. I shall bring up the dead to eat food like the living; and the hosts of the dead will outnumber the living."

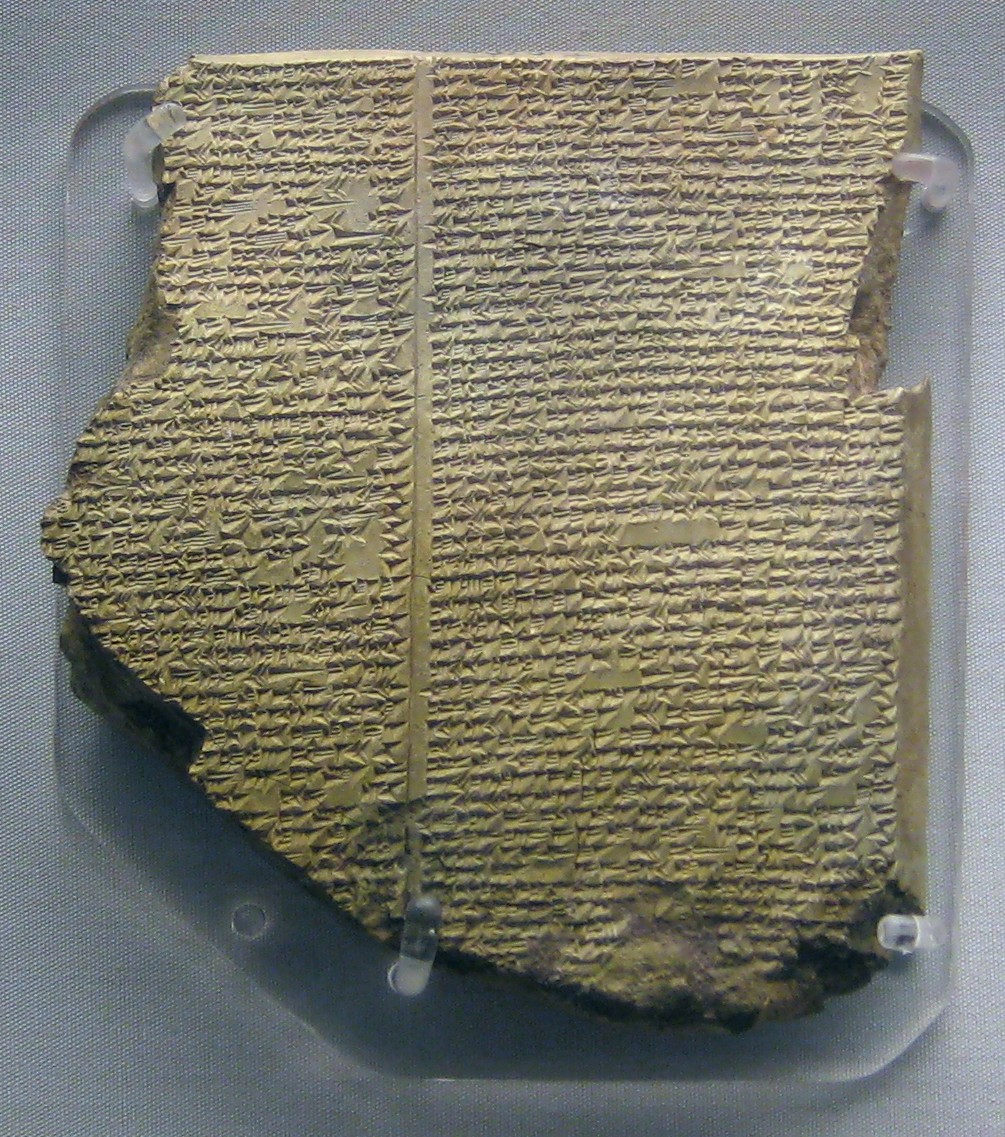
Original Akkadian Tablet XI (the "Deluge Tablet") of the Epic of Gilgamesh

Anu gives Ishtar the Bull of Heaven, and Ishtar sends it to attack Gilgamesh and his friend Enkidu. Gilgamesh and Enkidu kill the Bull and offer its heart to the sun-god Shamash. While Gilgamesh and Enkidu are resting, Ishtar stands up on the walls of Uruk and curses Gilgamesh. Enkidu tears off the Bull's right thigh and throws it in Ishtar's face, saying, "If I could lay my hands on you, it is this I should do to you, and lash your entrails to your side." (Enkidu later dies for this impiety.) Ishtar calls together "the crimped courtesans, prostitutes and harlots" and orders them to mourn for the Bull of Heaven. Meanwhile, Gilgamesh holds a celebration over the Bull of Heaven's defeat.

Later in the epic, Utnapishtim tells Gilgamesh the story of the Great Flood, which was sent by the god Enlil to annihilate all life on earth because the humans, who were vastly overpopulated, made too much noise and prevented him from sleeping. Utnapishtim tells how, when the flood came, Ishtar wept and mourned over the destruction of humanity, alongside the Anunnaki. Later, after the flood subsides, Utnapishtim makes an offering to the gods. Ishtar appears to Utnapishtim wearing a lapis lazuli necklace with beads shaped like flies and tells him that Enlil never discussed the flood with any of the other gods. She swears him that she will never allow Enlil to cause another flood and declares her lapis lazuli necklace a sign of her oath. Ishtar invites all the gods except for Enlil to gather around the offering and enjoy.

=== Song of Agushaya ===
The Song of Agushaya, an Akkadian text presumably from the time of Hammurabi, tells a myth mixed with hymnic passages: the war goddess Ishtar is filled with constant wrath and plagues the earth with war and battle. With her roar, she finally even threatens the wise god Ea in Apsû. He appears before the assembly of gods and decides (similar to Enkidu in the Epic of Gilgameš) to create an equal opponent for Ishtar. From the dirt of his fingernails he forms the powerful goddess Ṣaltum ("fight, quarrel"), whom he instructs to confront Ishtar disrespectfully and plague her day and night with her roar. The text section with the confrontation of both goddesses is not preserved, but it is followed by a scene in which Ishtar demands from Ea to call Ṣaltum back, which he does. Subsequently, Ea establishes a festival in which henceforth a "whirl dance" (gūštû) is to be performed annually in commemoration of the events. The text ends with the statement that Ishtar's heart has calmed down.

=== Other tales ===
A myth about the childhood of the god Ishum, viewed as a son of Shamash, describes Ishtar seemingly temporarily taking care of him, and possibly expressing annoyance at that situation.

In a pseudepigraphical Neo-Assyrian text written in the seventh century BCE, but which claims to be the autobiography of Sargon of Akkad, Ishtar is claimed to have appeared to Sargon "surrounded by a cloud of doves" while he was working as a gardener for Akki, the drawer of the water. Ishtar then proclaimed Sargon her lover and allowed him to become the ruler of Sumer and Akkad.

In Hurro-Hittite texts the logogram ^{d}ISHTAR denotes the goddess Šauška, who was identified with Ishtar in god lists and similar documents as well and influenced the development of the late Assyrian cult of Ishtar of Nineveh according to hittitologist Gary Beckman. She plays a prominent role in the Hurrian myths of the Kumarbi cycle.

== Later influence ==
=== In antiquity ===
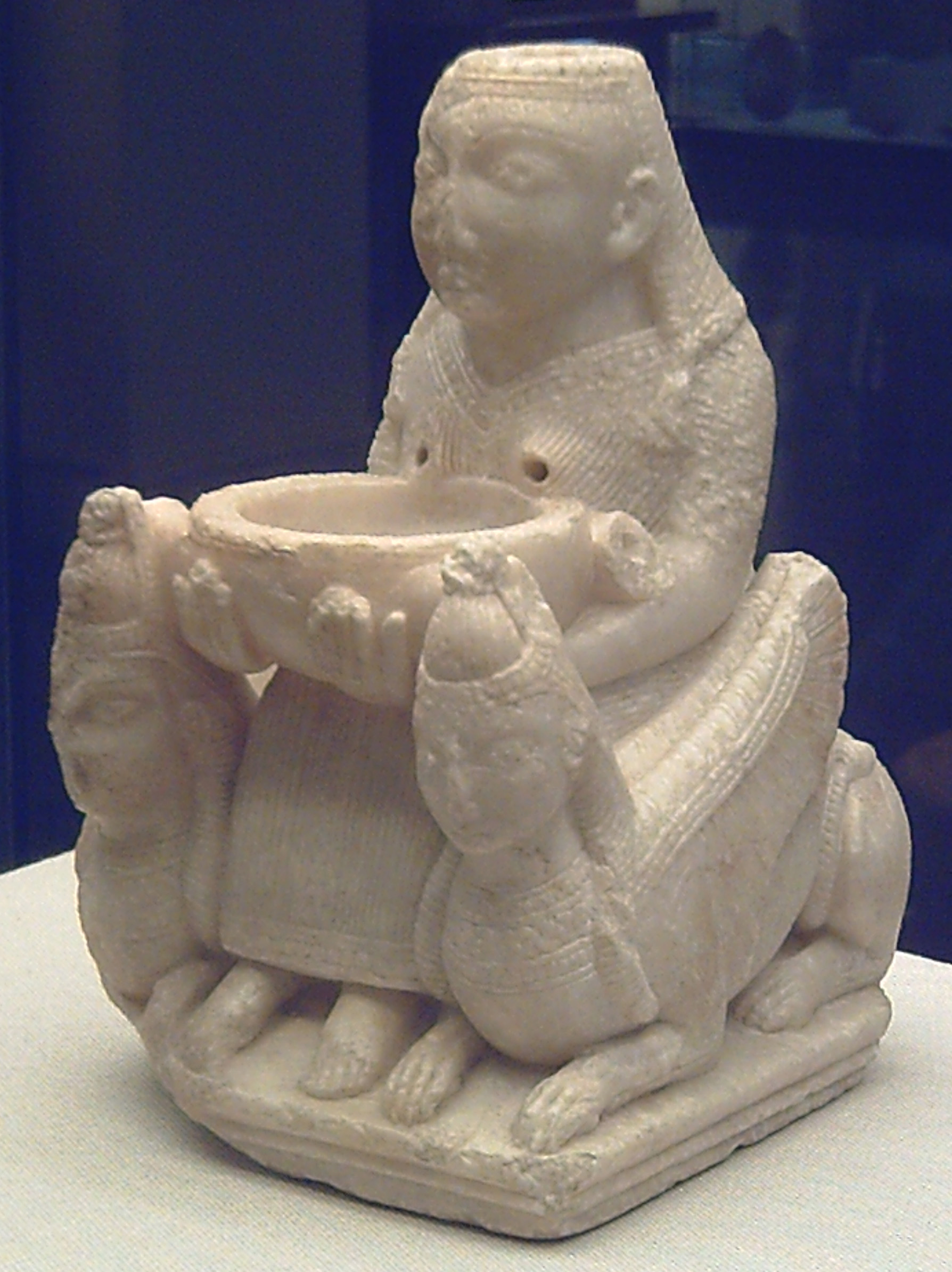
Phoenician figure dating to the seventh century BCE representing a goddess, probably Astarte, called the "Lady of Galera" (National Archaeological Museum of Spain)

The cult of Inanna/Ishtar may have been introduced to the Kingdom of Judah during the reign of King Manasseh and, although Inanna herself is not directly mentioned in the Bible by name, the Old Testament contains numerous allusions to her cult. Jeremiah 7:18 and Jeremiah 44:15–19 mention "the Queen of Heaven", who is probably a syncretism of Inanna/Ishtar and the West Semitic goddess Astarte. Jeremiah states that the Queen of Heaven was worshipped by women who baked cakes for her.

The Song of Songs bears strong similarities to the Sumerian love poems involving Inanna and Dumuzid, particularly in its usage of natural symbolism to represent the lovers' physicality. Song of Songs 6:10 Ezekiel 8:14 mentions Inanna's husband Dumuzid under his later East Semitic name Tammuz, and describes a group of women mourning Tammuz's death while sitting near the north gate of the Temple in Jerusalem. Marina Warner (a literary critic rather than Assyriologist) claims that early Christians in the Middle East assimilated elements of Ishtar into the cult of the Virgin Mary. She argues that the Syrian writers Jacob of Serugh and Romanos the Melodist both wrote laments in which the Virgin Mary describes her compassion for her son at the foot of the cross in deeply personal terms closely resembling Ishtar's laments over the death of Tammuz. However, broad comparisons between Tammuz and other dying gods are rooted in the work of James George Frazer and are regarded as a relic of less rigorous early 20th century Assyriology by more recent publications.

The cult of Inanna/Ishtar also heavily influenced the cult of the Phoenician goddess Astarte. The Phoenicians introduced Astarte to the Greek islands of Cyprus and Cythera, where she either gave rise to or at least heavily influenced the Greek goddess Aphrodite. Aphrodite took on Inanna/Ishtar's associations with sexuality and procreation. Furthermore, Aphrodite was known as Ourania (Οὐρανία), meaning "heavenly", corresponding to Inanna's role as the Queen of Heaven.

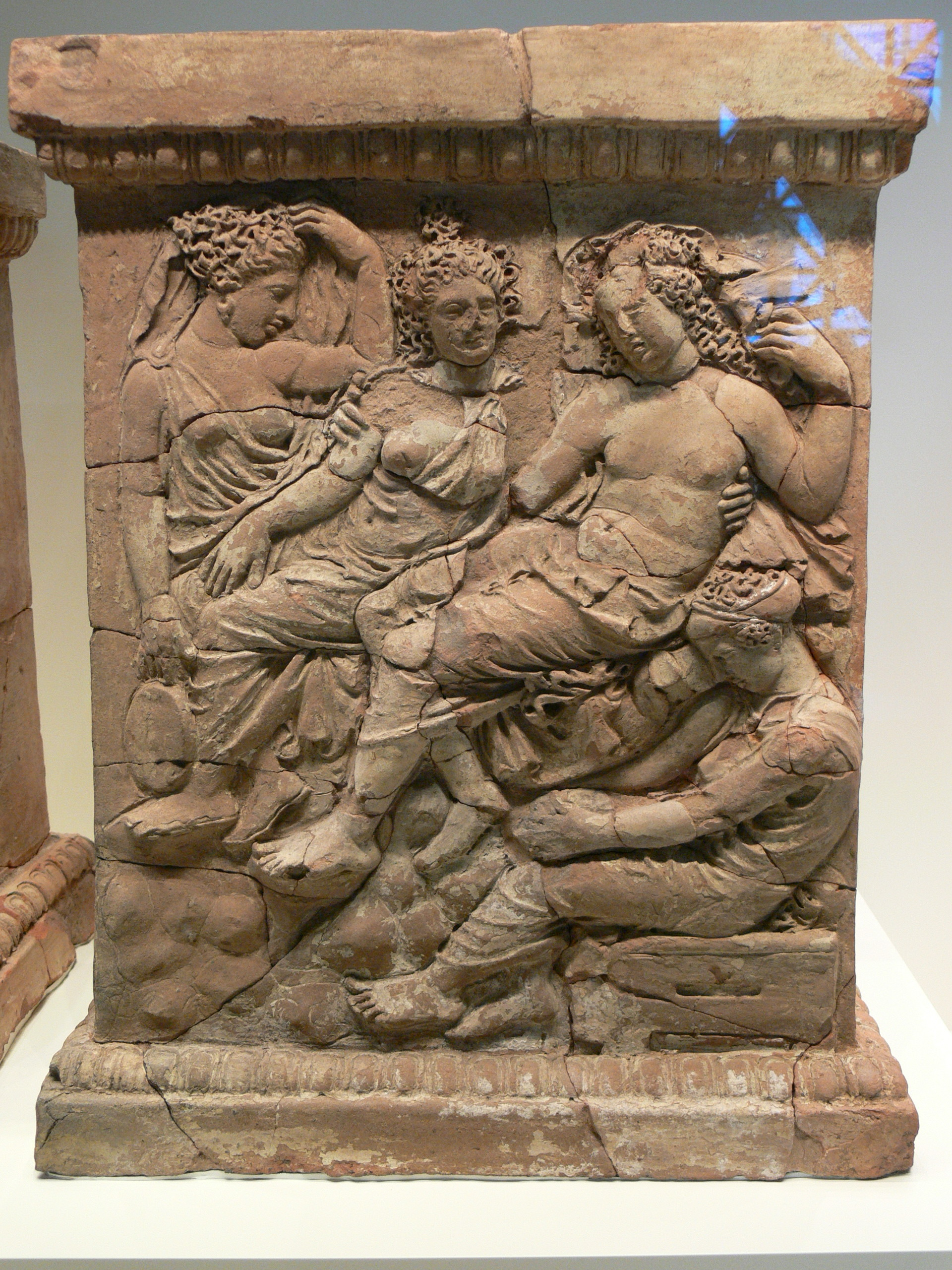
Altar from the Greek city of Taras in Magna Graecia, dating to c. 400 – c. 375 BCE, depicting Aphrodite and Adonis, whose myth is derived from the Mesopotamian myth of Inanna and Dumuzid

Early artistic and literary portrayals of Aphrodite are extremely similar to Inanna/Ishtar. Aphrodite was also a warrior goddess; the second-century CE Greek geographer Pausanias records that, in Sparta, Aphrodite was worshipped as Aphrodite Areia, which means "warlike". He also mentions that Aphrodite's most ancient cult statues in Sparta and on Cythera showed her bearing arms. Modern scholars note that Aphrodite's warrior-goddess aspects appear in the oldest strata of her worship and see it as an indication of her Near Eastern origins. Aphrodite also absorbed Ishtar's association with doves, which were sacrificed to her alone. The Greek word for "dove" was peristerá, which may be derived from the Semitic phrase peraḥ Ištar, meaning "bird of Ishtar". The myth of Aphrodite and Adonis is derived from the story of Inanna and Dumuzid.

Classical scholar Charles Penglase has written that Athena, the Greek goddess of wisdom and war, resembles Inanna's role as a "terrifying warrior goddess". Others have noted that the birth of Athena from the head of her father Zeus could be derived from Inanna's descent into and return from the Underworld. However, as noted by Gary Beckman, a rather direct parallel to Athena's birth is found in the Hurrian Kumarbi cycle, where Teshub is born from the surgically split skull of Kumarbi, rather than in any Inanna myths.

In Mandaean cosmology, one of the names for Venus is ʿStira, which is derived from the name Ishtar.

Anthropologist Kevin Tuite argues that the Georgian goddess Dali was also influenced by Inanna, noting that both Dali and Inanna were associated with the morning star, both were characteristically depicted nude, (but Assyriologists assume the "naked goddess" motif in Mesopotamian art in most cases cannot be Ishtar, and the goddess most consistently depicted as naked was Shala, a weather goddess unrelated to Ishtar) both were associated with gold jewelry, both sexually preyed on mortal men, both were associated with human and animal fertility, (note however that Assyriologist Dina Katz pointed out the references to fertility are more likely to be connected to Dumuzi than Inanna/Ishtar in at least some cases) and both had ambiguous natures as sexually attractive, but dangerous, women.

Traditional Mesopotamian religion gradually began to decline between the third and fifth centuries CE as ethnic Assyrians converted to Christianity. Nonetheless, the cult of Ishtar and Tammuz managed to survive in parts of Upper Mesopotamia. In the tenth century CE, an Arab traveler wrote that "All the Sabaeans of our time, those of Babylonia as well as those of Harran, lament and weep to this day over Tammuz at a festival which they, more particularly the women, hold in the month of the same name."

Worship of Venus deities possibly connected to Inanna/Ishtar was known in Pre-Islamic Arabia right up until the Islamic period. Isaac of Antioch (d. 406 CE) said that the Arabs worshipped 'the Star' (kawkabta), also known as Al-Uzza, which many identify with Venus. Isaac also mentions an Arabian deity named Baltis, which according to Jan Retsö most likely was another designation for Ishtar. In pre-Islamic Arabian inscriptions themselves, it appears that the deity known as Allat was also a Venusian deity. Attar, a male god whose name is a cognate of Ishtar's, is a plausible candidate for the role of Arabian Venus deity too on the account of both his name and his epithet "eastern and western".

=== Modern relevance ===
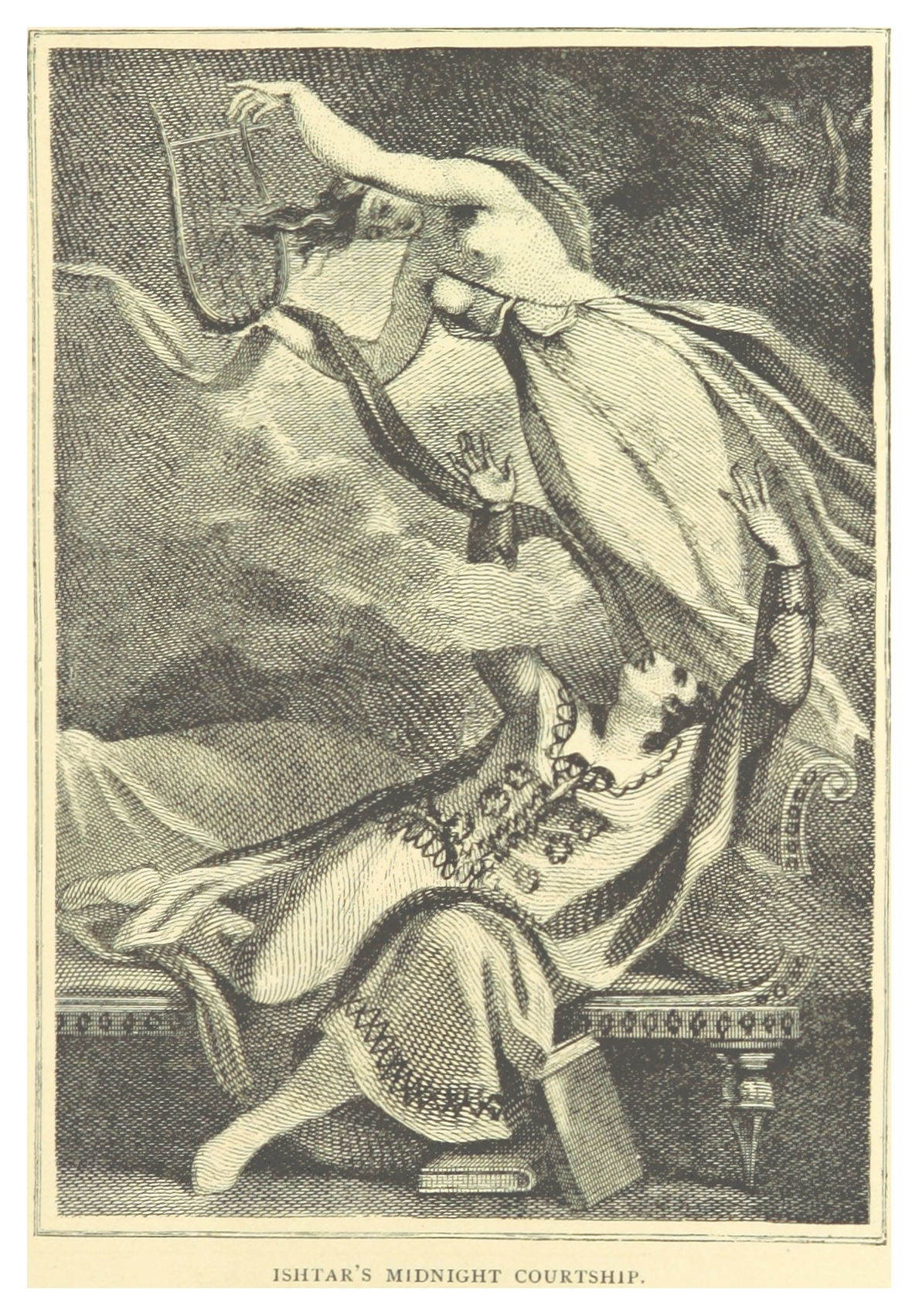
Illustration of Ishtar's Midnight Courtship from Leonidas Le Cenci Hamilton's 1884 book-length poem Ishtar and Izdubar, loosely based on George Smith's recent translation of the Epic of Gilgamesh

Alexander Hislop, a Protestant minister in the Free Church of Scotland, argued in the 1853 anti-Catholic pamphlet The Two Babylons that Roman Catholicism was actually Babylonian paganism in disguise, and claimed that the modern English word Easter must be derived from Ishtar due to the phonetic similarity. Modern scholars have unanimously rejected Hislop's arguments as based on a flawed understanding of etymology and of Babylonian religion. Nonetheless, Hislop's book is still popular among some evangelical Protestants, and its claims have become widely circulated in popular internet memes.

Ishtar had a major appearance in Ishtar and Izdubar, a book-length poem written in 1884 by Leonidas Le Cenci Hamilton, an American lawyer and businessman, loosely based on the recently translated Epic of Gilgamesh. Ishtar and Izdubar expanded the original roughly 3,000 lines of the Epic of Gilgamesh to roughly 6,000 lines of rhyming couplets grouped into forty-eight cantos. Hamilton significantly altered most of the characters and introduced entirely new episodes not found in the original epic. Significantly influenced by Edward FitzGerald's Rubaiyat of Omar Khayyam and Edwin Arnold's The Light of Asia, Hamilton's characters dress more like nineteenth-century Turks than ancient Babylonians. In the poem, Izdubar (an early misreading for the name "Gilgamesh") falls in love with Ishtar, but, then, "with hot and balmy breath, and trembling form aglow", she attempts to seduce him, leading Izdubar to reject her advances. Several "columns" of the book are devoted to an account of Ishtar's descent into the Underworld. At the conclusion of the book, Izdubar, now a god, is reconciled with Ishtar in Heaven. In 1887, the composer Vincent d'Indy wrote Symphony Ishtar, variations symphonique, Op. 42, a symphony inspired by the Assyrian monuments in the British Museum.

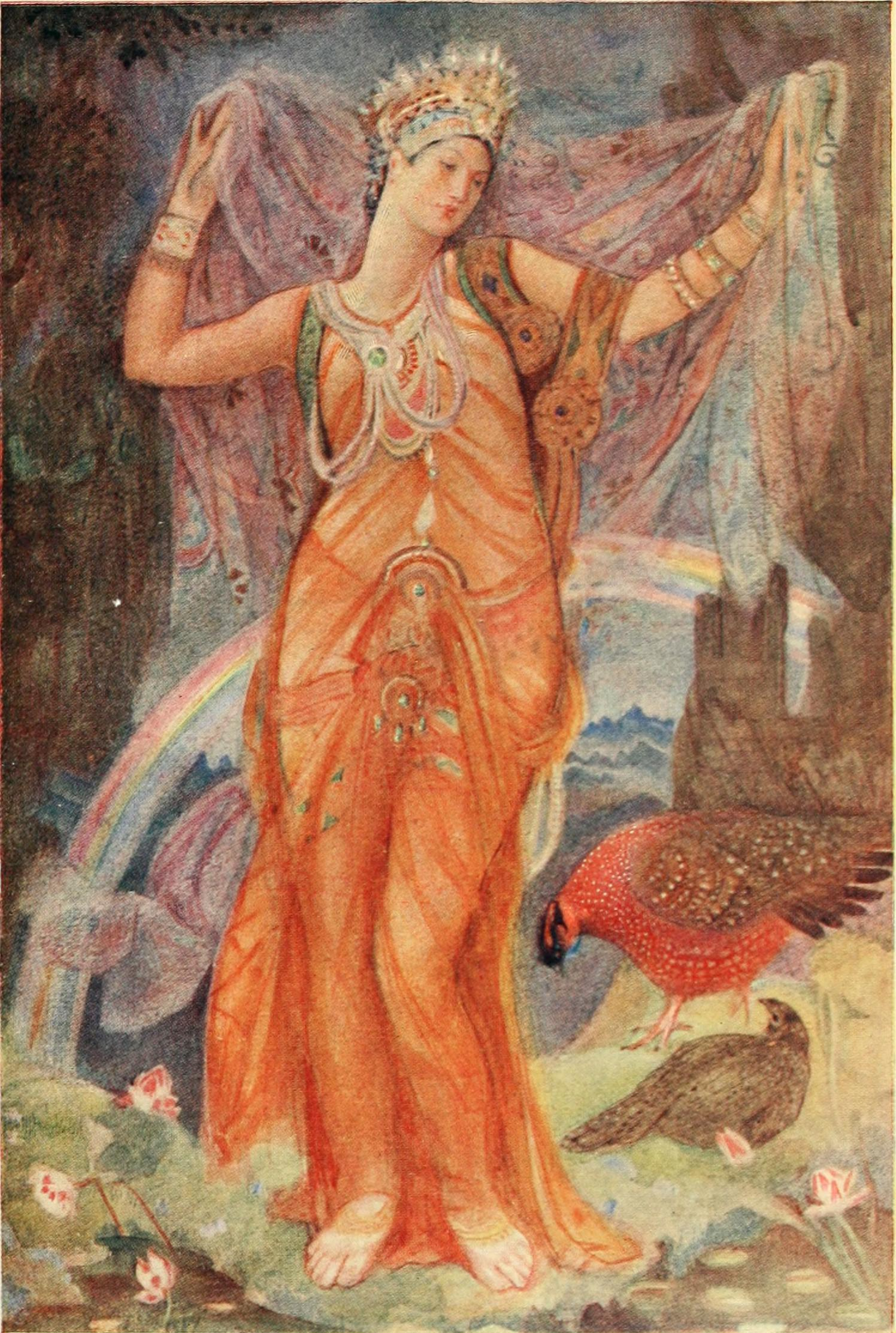
A modern illustration depicting Inanna-Ishtar's descent into the Underworld taken from Lewis Spence's Myths and Legends of Babylonia and Assyria (1916)

Inanna has become an important figure in modern feminist theory because she appears in the male-dominated Sumerian pantheon, but is equally if not more powerful than accompanying male deities. Simone de Beauvoir, in her book The Second Sex (1949), argues that Inanna, along with other powerful female deities of antiquity, have been marginalized by modern culture in favor of male deities. However, Tikva Frymer-Kensky has argued that Inanna was from the beginning a "marginal figure" in Sumerian religion, embodying the "socially unacceptable" archetype of the "undomesticated, unattached woman". Feminist author Johanna Stuckey disagrees, pointing out Inanna's centrality in Sumerian religion and her broad diversity of powers, inconsistent with any view of her as "marginal". Assyriologist Julia M. Asher-Greve, a specialist in women's roles in antiquity, deprecates Frymer-Kensky's studies of Mesopotamian religion generally, especially criticizing Frymer-Kensky's focus on fertility, her narrow selection of sources, and her "mirror theory" that position of goddesses in the pantheon reflected that of ordinary women in society, concluding that her works do not accurately reflect the complex and changing roles of goddesses in ancient Mesopotamia. Ilona Zsolnay is also skeptical of Frymer-Kensky's methodology.

Inanna is also an important figure in BDSM culture. The portrayal of Inanna in the Inanna and Ebih myth is cited as a precursor of the dominatrix archetype, characterizing her as a powerful woman who forces gods and men to submit to her. In mythology, Inanna's submissives danced in rituals while being whipped for her satisfaction. When victims begged for mercy, Inanna ended the flagellation, prefiguring the BDSM safeword concept.

==== In Neopaganism and Sumerian reconstructionism ====
Inanna is a name of the Goddess used in modern Neopaganism and Wicca, for example in the "Burning Times Chant", one of the most widely used Wiccan liturgies. Inanna's Descent into the Underworld was the inspiration for the "Descent of the Goddess", one of the most popular texts of Gardnerian Wicca.

== In popular culture ==
Ishtar is a key figure in the novel The Ship of Ishtar by A. Merritt.

Inanna is the protagonist of Star Dancer (1993), a fantasy novel by Fay Sampson.

The goddess Inanna serves as the main female protagonist in the first two films of the Myth Trilogy, a three-part Kurdish-American film series based on ancient mythologies. In the feature film Where Is Gilgamesh? (2024), which is based on the Epic of Gilgamesh, she appears as a rival to Gilgamesh and the protector of an ancient hidden secret. In the science fiction follow-up, Anfa 8 (2026), the narrative and her character are based on the Descent of Inanna into the Underworld.

== Dates (approximate) ==
Historical sources
| Time | Period | Source |
| c. 5300–4100 BCE | Ubaid period |
| c. 4100–2900 BCE | Uruk period | Uruk vase |
| c. 2900–2334 BCE | Early Dynastic period |
| c. 2334–2218 BCE | Akkadian Empire | writings by Enheduanna: Nin-me-šara, "The Exaltation of Inanna"; In-nin ša-gur-ra, "A Hymn to Inanna (Inana C)"; In-nin me-huš-a, "Inanna and Ebih"; The Temple Hymns; Hymn to Nanna, "The Exaltation of Inanna" |
| c. 2218–2047 BCE | Gutian Period |
| c. 2047–1940 BCE | Ur III Period | Enmerkar and the Lord of Aratta Gilgamesh, Enkidu, and the Netherworld; Inanna and Enki; Inanna's Descent into the Underworld |

== See also ==
- Gala
- Nana (Bactrian goddess)
