= Tell Abu al-Dhahab =

Archaeological site in Iraq

- Location within Iraq
- 30°44′16.4″N 46°41′33″E
- Type: settlement
- Periods: Bronze Age
- Location: Dhi Qar Governorate, Iraq

History
- Built: Middle 2nd millennium BC

Site notes
- Excavation dates: 2011-2013
- Condition: Ruined
- Owner: Public
- Public access: Yes

Tell Abu al-Dhahab is an ancient Near Eastern archaeological site in Hor al-Malih, one of the al-Hammar al-Gharbi marshes, in Dhi Qar Governorate, Iraq. The name means "Father of Gold". Its ancient name is unknown though during its single period of occupation in the 2nd millennium BC it was part of the First Sealand dynasty. One other Sealand site, Tell Khaiber, has been excavated. It has been suggested that Pašime (Tell Abu Sheeja) also was a Sealand Dynasty site.

== Archaeology ==
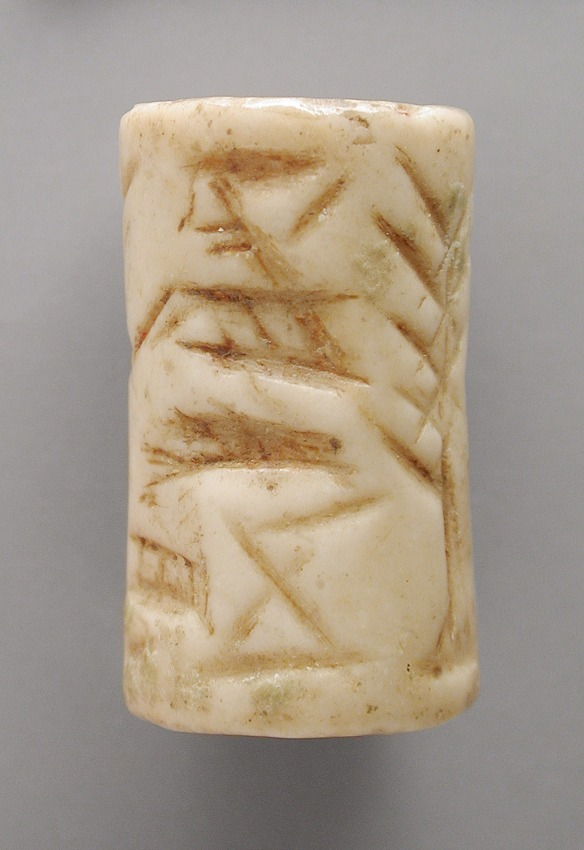
Example of an alabaster cylinder seal

Tell Abu al-Dhahab was excavated in a rescue effort by Iraq archaeologists from 2011 to 2013. They noted evidence of small scale looting. Further work at the site was planned but there is no record of it occurring. The mound is an oval (900 meters east–west and 300 meters north–south) about 5.6 hectares in area and rising about 5.6 meters above the plain. The mound is cut into two parts by a modern pit (the Karmashiya Pit) dug for graves causing significant damage to the site. On the surface were found large amounts of broken pottery and bricks as well, on the north and south sides, large numbers of small molten bricks and copper fragments. On the western slope there is a thick layer of ash with pieces of white, pink and black stone. It has a single occupation period dating to the First Sealand dynasty with at least 8 occupation levels in that period extending up to 8 meters in total depth. A number of buildings of a secular and religious nature were uncovered including a mudbrick residential neighborhood. The excavations focused on the high point of the mound where a large 65 meters by 52 meters rectangular temple building, constructed of limestone with plaster mortar, was found. The building had a large central courtyard and spiral columns. Besides the courtyard it contained 20 rooms. The presence of 5 niches led the excavators to propose that multiple deities were worshipped in the temple. Five meters away to the west the temple had a 59 meter by 35 meter stone built annex. The excavation report mentioned a small parchment shard with cuneiform writing on it. Pottery finds included cylindrical, spherical, and bell shaped jars, plates, and cups. Metallic finds were copper in various forms, aside from a gold earring.

Finds at the site included "jars with cuneiform symbols, cylinder seals, various metal items, ivory pieces, in addition to the bone of an animal leg engraved with the face of a woman". Two cylinder seals were found, one of "red stone". One cylinder seal (IM 230856), currently held at the Iraq Museum, is 3.2 cm in height, and 1.5 cm in diameter and was made of red alabaster and contained an inscription with a proposed reading of "A-[x]-Bāni, offspring of Ṣillī-Ištar, Supervisor (of) the divination priests, Servant/slave to Shamash(?)." though the name of the deity is not certain.

== History ==
While is clear that the site was part of the Sealand Dynasty for an extended period it is not known when it was founded or when it was abandoned nor was its name at that time known.

The Sealand Dynasty gained control of the southern areas of Mesopotamia with the decline in power of the First Babylonian Empire beginning late in the reign of Samsu-iluna (c. 1749–1712 BC), the 7th ruler of Babylon. It lasted about 3 centuries. The capital of the dynasty, is thought to have been named Dūr-Enlil (or Dūr-Enlile or Dūr-Enlilē) whose location is unknown. The only other excavated Sealand Dynasty site is Tell Khaiber.

== See also ==
- Cities of the ancient Near East
- List of Mesopotamian dynasties
- List of Mesopotamian deities
- Rejibah
- Tell Dehaila
