= Nammu =

Mesopotamian goddess

- Creator goddess
- Major cult center: Eridu

Genealogy
- Children: Enki

Nammu (𒀭𒇉 ^{d}ENGUR = ^{d}LAGAB×ḪAL; also read Namma) was a Mesopotamian goddess regarded as a creator deity in the local theology of Eridu. It is assumed that she was associated with water. She is also well attested in connection with incantations and apotropaic magic. She was regarded as the mother of Enki, and in a single inscription she appears as the wife of Anu, but it is assumed that she usually was not believed to have a spouse. From the Old Babylonian period onwards, she was considered to be the mother of An (Heaven) and Ki (Earth), as well as a representation of the primeval sea/ocean, an association that may have come from influence from the goddess Tiamat.

While Nammu is already attested in sources from the Early Dynastic period, such as the zame hymns and an inscription of Lugal-kisalsi, she was not commonly worshipped. A temple dedicated to her existed in Ur in the Old Babylonian period, she is also attested in texts from Nippur and Babylon. Theophoric names invoking her were rare, with that of king Ur-Nammu until recently being believed to be the only example.

In the Old Babylonian myth Enki and Ninmah, Nammu is one of the deities involved in the creation of mankind alongside the eponymous pair and a group of seven minor goddesses. Her presence differentiates this narrative from other texts dealing with the same motif, such as Atra-Hasis.

== Name and epithets ==
Nammu's name was represented in cuneiform by the Sumerogram ENGUR (LAGAB×ḪAL). Lexical lists provide evidence for multiple readings, including Nammu, Namma and longer, reduplicated variants such as Namnamu and Nannama. A bilingual text from Tell Harmal treats the short and long forms of the name as if they were respectively the Akkadian and Sumerian versions of the same word. The name is conventionally translated as "creatrix." This interpretation depends on the theory that it is etymologically related to the element imma (SIG_{7}) in the name of the goddess Ninimma, which could be explained in Akkadian as nabnītu or bunnannû, two terms pertaining to creation. However, this proposal is not universally accepted. Another related possibility is to interpret it as a genitive compound, (e)n + amma(k), "lady of the cosmic river," but it is similarly not free of criticism, and it has been argued no clear evidence for the etymology for Nammu's name exists. Ancient authors secondarily etymologized it as nig_{2}-nam-ma, "creativity", "totality" or "everything".

The sign ENGUR could also be read as engur, a synonym of apsu, but when used in this context, it was not identical with the name of the goddess, and Nammu could be referred to as the creator of engur, which according to Frans Wiggermann confirms she and the mythical body of water were not identical.

Nammu could be referred to with epithets such as "lady who is great and high in the sea" (nin-ab-gal-an-na-u_{5}-a), "mother who gave birth to heaven and earth" (^{d}ama-tu-an-ki) or "first mother who gave birth to all (or senior) gods" (ama-palil-u_{3}-tu-diĝir-šar-šar-ra-ke_{4}-ne). The motherhood of Nammu to heaven and earth is attested in texts like the god-list TCL XV 10 and is related to the status attained from the Old Babylonian period onwards as the mother of An (Heaven) and Ki (Earth).

== Character ==
Few sources providing information about Nammu's character are known. Most of them come from the Old Babylonian period. Based on indirect evidence it is assumed she was associated with water, though there is debate among researchers over whether sweet or saline. No explicit references to Nammu being identical with the sea are known, and Manuel Ceccarelli in a recent study suggests she might have represented groundwater. Jan Lisman, who views Nammu as having been a representation of the primordial ocean/sea from which the rest of the cosmos emerged, believes that Nammu's association with this body of water may have come from the influence of the goddess Tiamat.

In the local tradition of Eridu, Nammu was regarded as a creator deity. There is no indication in known texts that she had a spouse when portrayed as such. Julia M. Asher-Greve suggests that while generally treated as a goddess, Nammu can be considered asexual in this context. Joan Goodnick Westenholz assumed the process of creation she was involved in was imagined as comparable to parthenogenesis. While primordial figures were often considered to no longer be active by the ancient Mesopotamians, in contrast with other deities, Nammu was apparently believed to still exist as an active figure.

Nammu was also associated with incantations, apotropaic magic and tools and materials used in them. In a single incantation she is called bēlet egubbê, "mistress of the holy water basin", but this epithet was usually regarded as belonging to Ningirima, rather than her. In texts of this genre, she could be invoked in order to purificate or consecrate something, or against demons, illness or scorpions.

== Associations with other deities ==
Nammu was regarded as the mother of Enki (Ea), as indicated by the myth Enki and Ninmah, the god list An = Anum and a bilingual incantation. However, references to her being his sole parent are less common than the well attested tradition according to which he was one of the children of Anu. Julia Krul assumes that in the third millennium BCE Nammu was regarded as the spouse of the latter god. She is designated this way in an inscription of Lugal-kisalsi from the Early Dynastic period. However, this is the only known reference to the existence of such a tradition. Wilfred G. Lambert concluded that Nammu had no traditional spouse.

In incantations, Nammu could appear alongside deities such as Enki, Asalluhi and Nanshe. An early literary text known from a copy from Ebla mentions a grouping of deities presumed to share judiciary functions which includes Nammu, Shamash, Ishtaran and Idlurugu.

A single explanatory text equates Nammu with Apsu. It seemingly reinterprets her as a male deity and as the spouse of Nanshe. However, it most likely depends on traditions pertaining to Enūma Eliš and does not represent a separate independent tradition. As of 2017, no clear evidence for the belief in personified Apsu predating the composition of this text was known. Additionally, while the presumed theogony focused on Nammu is the closest possible parallel to Tiamat's role in Enūma Eliš, according to Manuel Ceccarelli the two were not closely connected. In particular, there is no evidence Nammu was ever regarded as an antagonistic figure.

== Worship ==
Evidence for the worship of Nammu is scarce in all periods it is attested in. She belonged to the local pantheon of Eridu, and could be referred to as the divine mother of this city. The only indication of an association with a local pantheon other than that of Eridu is the epithet assigned to her in the god list An = Anum (tablet I, line 27), ^{munus}agrig-zi-é-kur-(ra-)ke_{4}, "true housekeeper of Ekur", but it might have only been assigned to her due to confusion with similarly named Ninimma, who was a member of Enlil's court. The Early Dynastics zame hymns assign a separate settlement to her, but the reading of its name remains uncertain. Lugal-kisalsi, a king of Uruk, built a temple dedicated to her, but its ceremonial name is not known. An inscription dated to around 2400-2250 BCE commemorates this event:

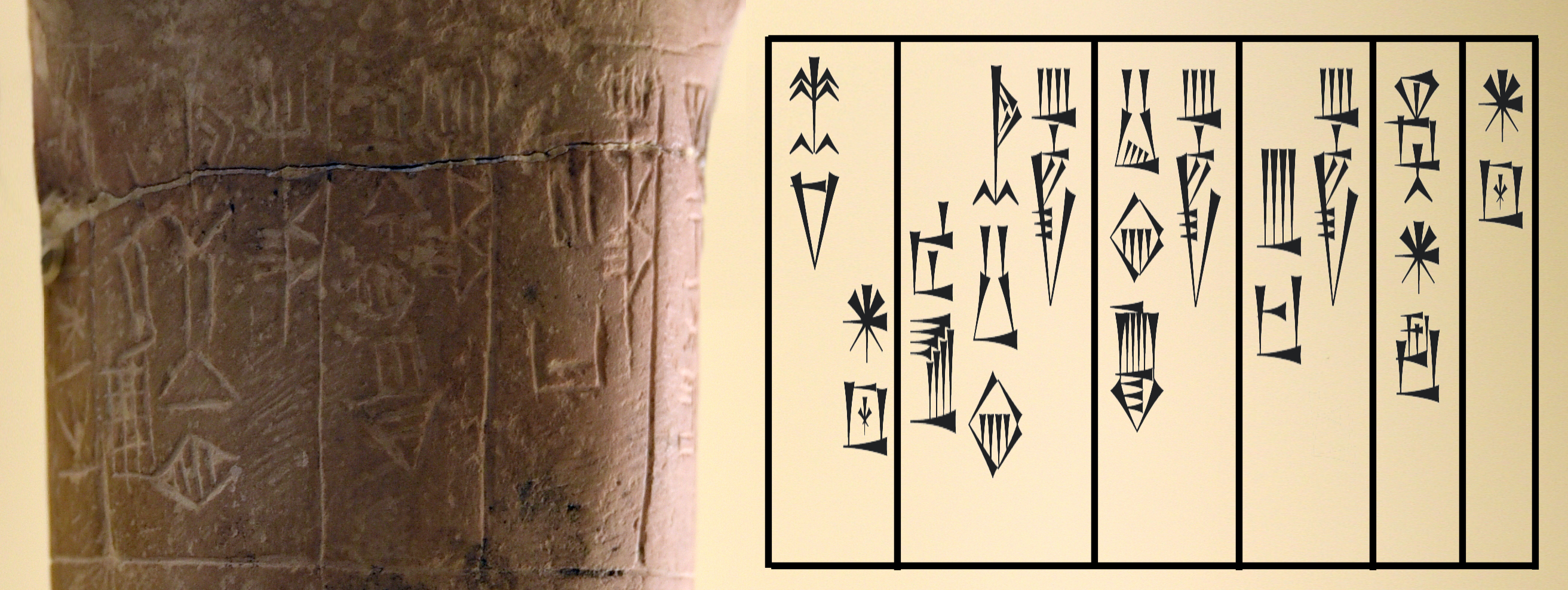

𒀭𒇉 / 𒁮𒀭𒊏 / 𒈗𒆦𒋛 / 𒈗𒀕𒆠𒂵 / 𒈗𒋀𒀊𒆠𒈠 / 𒂍𒀭𒇉 / 𒈬𒆕
^{d}namma / dam an-ra / lugal-kisal-si / lugal unu^{ki}-ga / lugal urim_{5}^{ki}-ma / e_{2} ^{d}namma / mu-du_{3}

"For Namma, the wife of An, Lugalkisalsi, king of Uruk and king of Ur, the temple of Namma he built."

In the Ur III period, Nammu is attested in various incantations invoking deities associated with Eridu. She received offerings in Ur in the Old Babylonian period, and texts from this location mention the existence of a temple and clergy (including gudu_{4} priests) dedicated to her, as well as a field named after her. She also appears in the contemporary god list from Nippur as the 107th entry.

According to Frans Wiggermann, a kudurru (inscribed boundary stone) inscription indicates that a temple of Nammu existed in the Sealand at least since the reign of Gulkišar, that it remained in use during the reign of Enlil-nadin-apli of the Second Dynasty of Isin, and that its staff included a šangû priest. The latter king also invoked her alongside Nanshe in a blessing formula. A dedicatory inscription from the Kassite period which mentions Nammu is also known, though its point of origin remains uncertain. Based on a document most likely written during the reign of Esarhaddon, Nammu was also worshipped in É-DÚR-gi-na, the temple of Lugal-asal in Bāṣ.

Shrines named kius-Namma, "footstep of Nammu", existed in Ekur in Nippur and in Esagil in Babylon. Andrew R. George suggests that the latter, attested in a source from the reign of Nabonidus, was named after the former.

It is assumed that Nammu was not a popular deity. As of 1998, the only known example of a theophoric name invoking Nammu was that of king Ur-Nammu. Further studies identified no other names invoking her in sources from the Ur III period. However, two further examples have been identified in a more recent survey of texts from Kassite Nippur.

Texts dealing with the study of calendars (hemerologies) indicate that the twenty seventh day of the month could be regarded as a festival of Nammu and Nergal, and prescribe royal offerings to these two deities during it.

== Mythology ==
Nammu appears in the myth Enki and Ninmah. While the text comes from Old Babylonian period, it might reflect an older tradition from the Ur III period. Two complete copies most likely postdating the reign of Samsu-iluna are known, in addition to a bilingual Sumero-Akkadian version from the library of Ashurbanipal. In the beginning of the composition, Nammu wakes up her son Enki to inform him that other gods are complaining about the heavy tasks assigned to them. As a solution, he suggests the creation of mankind, and instructs Nammu how to form men from clay with the help of Ninmah and her assistants (Ninimma, Shuzianna, Ninmada, Ninšar, Ninmug, Mumudu and Ninnigina according to Wilfred G. Lambert's translation). After the task is finished, Enki prepares a banquet for Nammu and Ninmah, which other deities, such as Anu, Enlil and the seven assistants, also attend. Nammu's presence sets the account of creation of mankind in this myth from other compositions dealing with the same topic, such as Atra-Hasis.
