= Gulkišar =

Ancient Mesopotamian king

- King of the Sealand
- Reign: c. 1595 BCE
- Predecessor: Šušši
- Successor: Pešgaldarameš or DIŠ+U-EN
- Dynasty: First Sealand dynasty

Gulkišar (Sumerian: gul-ki-šár; also romanized as Gulkishar) was the sixth king from the First Sealand dynasty. He reigned over a part of Lower Mesopotamia around 1595 BCE, contemporarily with the end of the reign of Samsu-Ditana, the final ruler from the First Dynasty of Babylon. The full territorial extent of his kingdom remains uncertain, though it is assumed that it encompassed the shore of the Persian Gulf, the lower Tigris and Euphrates, as well as part of central Babylonia. It remains a subject of debate among researchers whether he ever controlled Babylon itself. In contrast with many other members of his dynasty, who are only known from king lists, he continued to be referenced in various genres of texts up to the first millennium BCE. The best-known example is an epic portraying his conflict with Samsu-Ditana, in which he is aided by the goddess Ishtar.

== Name ==
The name Gulkišar was written gul-ki-šár in cuneiform. A shortened form, Gulki (gul-ki), is known from the Babylonian King List A, though it might only be a result of the last sign being lost. The full form of name can be translated as "raider of the totality", "destroyer of the universe" or "conqueror of the world".

Gulkišar was the first king from the First Sealand dynasty to bear a Sumerian name, which might have reflected a conscious appeal to the past of Lower Mesopotamia, though like the names of his successors it is unusual (Note: However, with the exception of the names of kings and some officials, who might have been emulating them, Sumerian was not in widespread use in the Sealand, and the overwhelming majority of discovered texts are written in Akkadian.) and finds no parallel in earlier onomastics. Odette Boivin argues that Gulkišar might have been a regnal name. She suggests that the king might have assumed it after his victory over Samsu-Ditana of Babylon.

== Family ==
Family relations of the Sealand kings, including Gulkišar, are poorly known. It has been suggested that his wife might have been Tešmit-māti (^{d}te-eš-mi-it-ma-ti; "reconciliation of the land" or "obedience of the land"), though this proposal rests on the assumption that she was posthumously deified, as the name occurs in a list of deities alongside the figure Šamaš-ana-Gulkišar-kurrub ("Shamash, bless Gulkišar!"). (Note: The similarity of the name to the theonym Tashmetum is most likely accidental.)

Based on the Babylonian King List B (tablet BM 38122), a Neo-Babylonian text which records the reigns of kings from the First Dynasty of Babylon and First Sealand Dynasty, it has been suggested that Pešgaldarameš and Ayadaragalama were Gulkišar's sons, and that the element dara ("ibex" or "stag") in their names refers to their father. However, it is also possible that Ayadaragalama was the son of Pešgaldarameš, and thus a grandson of Gulkišar.

== Reign ==
=== Overview ===
Gulkišar was the sixth ruler from the First Sealand Dynasty. He succeeded Šušši. A kudurru inscription dated to the reign of Enlil-nadin-apli (late twelfth or early eleventh century BCE) refers to him with the title "king of the Sealand" (LUGAL KUR A.AB.BA), though it is not certain when it originally came to be applied to rulers from his dynasty. Their kingdom was most likely originally known under the name Eurukug. This term might refer to the original seat of power of the dynasty. Identification with Ur or with Tell Dehaila (located some 30 kilometers further down the Euphrates) has been proposed. (Note: Phonetic similarity between the Sealand Eurukug and the secondary name of the temple precinct of Girsu is most likely not relevant, as there is no evidence that the former territory of Lagash and its deities, with the exception of Nanshe, were significant for the Sealand dynasty.)

Samsu-Ditana from the First Dynasty of Babylon and Gulkišar were contemporaries. However, he most likely only ascended to the throne in the final years of the Babylonian king's reign. On this basis it can be established that he must have already been in power c. 1595 BCE. According to the Babylonian King List A his reign lasted 55 years. However, it is possible that this source slightly exaggerates the lengths of reigns of the individual kings of the Sealand. It has been suggested that its compilers rounded them up to numbers ending in 0 or 5 when no detailed records were available to them, though this remains speculative. (Note: Paul-Alain Beaulieu suggests that the length of the reign of Pešgaldarameš might be more exaggerated, as other sources indicate he only ruled for 29 years, not 50 as stated in the aforementioned king list.)

According to the Neo-Assyrian Synchronistic King List, which lists Assyrian rulers with their Babylonian contemporaries, though without specifying the lengths of their reigns, Sharma-Adad I, who might have reigned in Assur as a governor on behalf of a ruler of Ekallatum, was a further contemporary of Gulkišar, but the synchronism between their reigns has not yet been confirmed by any other sources. It is also possible that either Gandaš or Agum-kakrime of the Kassite dynasty was a further contemporary of Gulkišar, though in both cases only late indirect evidence is available, and a precise chronology cannot be established.

Gulkišar has been characterized by Assyriologists as an ambitious ruler. During his reign the Sealand state consolidated power across Mesopotamia in the aftermath of the sack of Babylon by Mursili I and his Hittite forces.

=== Controlled territories ===
The full extent of the kingdom of Sealand remains uncertain, though it can be assumed that it encompassed the lower Tigris and Euphrates, and that it reached up to the shore of the Persian Gulf in the south (Note: Evidence for the control of Dilmun (Bahrain) is only available from the reign of Ea-gamil.) and possibly up to central Babylonia in the north. It is uncertain if Nippur was a part of it, despite the importance of deities associated with it in the official pantheon. In has been proposed that Gulkišar might have also controlled Babylon, though Odette Boivin considers this unlikely. However, Elyze Zomer argues that the inclusion of the Sealand dynasty in later lists of kings of Babylon might have been the result of one of its members temporarily controlling the city. This conclusion is also supported by Stephanie Dalley. Zomer states that while it has been assumed that the Kassite dynasty took over Babylon immediately after the reign of Samsu-Ditana, a reassessment taking the political importance of the Sealand dynasty might be warranted. (Note: She suggests the first Kassite kings controlling Babylon were Ḫurbaḫ (or Ḫurbazum) and Šipta-ulzi known from the Tell Muhammad texts. The reign of the latter postdates the fall of Babylon, while the former might have been a contemporary of Samsu-Ditana.) However, she estimates that Gulkišar must have controlled the city at most for a single year. Dalley argues that his influence might have reached even further, to the north of Sippar. No evidence from the reigns of Gulkišar's successors indicates that they controlled these northern areas, though the flourishing of trade between then and the Sealand might reflect former dependence.

=== Succession ===
Most sources indicate that Gulkišar was succeeded on the throne by Pešgaldarameš, though the Synchronistic King List places an additional ruler between them. He bears the name DIŠ+U-EN (reading uncertain). He is not attested in any other texts, and his historicity is uncertain. The Babylonian King List A (tablet BM 33332), which documents all dynasties which reigned in Babylon from the First Dynasty of Babylon up to the Neo-Babylonian period, might also attest the existence of an additional otherwise unattested Sealand king who reigned immediately after Gulkišar. The sign AŠ is placed between him and Pešgaldarameš, though if it is a part of an otherwise lost name the note tallying the number of kings at the end of the section would be incorrect. Odette Boivin argues that ultimately the matter is impossible to resolve in the light of presently available sources, and it should be considered uncertain who succeeded Gulkišar.

== Legacy ==
In contrast with most other kings from the First Sealand Dynasty, who after their reigns were only referenced in king lists, Gulkišar is attested in other genres texts as well. He continued to be referenced up to the first millennium BCE.

=== Epic of Gulkišar ===
An epic focused on the exploits of Gulkišar is preserved on the tablet HS 1885+. It comes from Nippur, and presently belongs to the Hilprecht-Sammlung (Jena, Germany), with two additional joins identified in the collection of the University of Pennsylvania. It might have originally been composed during his reign, or shortly after it, though no later than a few decades after the fall of Babylon at the end of Samsu-Ditana's reign. However, the sole surviving copy dates to the Middle Babylonian period, as indicated by the use of sign forms first attested in the Kassite period. It is possible that the epic was preserved in a scribal school due to interest in copying compositions about the deeds of past kings.

The Epic of Gulkišar was written in Akkadian and is a standard example of a royal epic, comparable to works such as Hammurabi's Deeds, the Epic of Zimri-Lim and the Epic of Tukultī-Ninurta. The second of these works offers a particularly close parallel structurally. The epic describes a conflict between Gulkišar and Samsu-Ditana. It is the only Sealand text discovered so far which mentions a ruler from the First Dynasty of Babylon. The best preserved section describes Gulkišar giving a speech to his troops to convince them he can defeat the rival king.

During his campaign Gulkišar is supported by the goddess Ishtar. She is referred to with the epithet "beloved of the sea(land)", narāmti A.AB.BA. (Note: While the Sealand was usually referred to as KUR A.AB.BA (māt tâmti), A.AB.BA (tâmti) functioned as a shortened form of this toponym.) The same local hypostasis of Ishtar is also attested in the god list An = Anum (tablet IV, line 129), where she is provided with the name Ayyabitu (ia-bi-i-tu), "the Sealander".

It has been suggested that the Epic of Gulkišar was based on historical events, though its compilers might have partially reinterpreted them for propagandistic purposes. Susanne Paulus argues that it reflects active contribution of the forces of the Sealand under Gulkišar in the fall of Babylon. Nathan Wasserman and Ygal Bloch also assume that it portrays historical events, and argue that the confrontation between the two rulers occurred near the end of Samsu-Ditana's reign, and that it weakened Babylon and directly made the sack of the city by the Hittites possible. However, Odette Boivin notes that later sources consistently held Hittites to be solely responsible for the fall of Babylon, with no mention of the Sealand, and on this basis argues it cannot be established if Gulkišar played a role in the decline and fall of the city. She points out the kingdom of Babylon was most likely already in decline when Samsu-Ditana ascended to the throne, and that he was losing territory even before the fall of his capital. His kingdom had multiple enemies, as evidenced by an oracular text (tāmītu) which mentions the armies of Elam, the otherwise unattested Edaštušu, Hanigalbat (in this context most likely a designation for Hurrians), Idamaraṣ (a state in the Diyala valley), Kassites and Samharites (already attested as enemies of Ammi-Saduqa) threatening one of his fortresses. She states that the kingdom of Sealand might have therefore at most been one of the many forces which contributed to Samsu-Ditana's eventual downfall.

=== Kudurru of Enlil-nādin-apli ===
The inscription on a kudurru from the fourth year of the reign of Enlil-nādin-apli from the Second Dynasty of Isin states that a patch of land located in the immediate proximity the Tigris, in the province of Bīt-Sîn-māgir, was originally donated by Gulkišar to the goddess Nanshe. However, it is not certain if it refers to a genuine historical event from his reign. Odette Boivin argues that Enlil-nādin-apli might have referenced Gulkišar because he was still well remembered in the area where the kudurru was erected.

According to the formula inscribed on the kudurru 696 years have passed between the reigns of Gulkišar and Nebuchadnezzar I. However, this is incorrect, as it would require the former to have reigned in the late nineteenth century BCE. Paul-Alain Beaulieu suggests that the author of this text used the reign lengths from the Babylonian King List A, as the sum of years assigned to his successors is 120, while the sum of reigns of rulers from the Kassite dynasty—576; presumably the 32 years assigned to the Second Dynasty of Isin (up to Nebuchadnezzar I) were ignored.

=== Glass-making treatise of Il'e-bulluṭa-Marduk ===
Gulkišar's name is attested in the colophon of a glass-making treatise from the Kassite period (tablet BM 120960). It states that it was prepared by a certain Il'e-bulluṭa-Marduk in "the year after Gulkišar became king". Nathan Wasserman and Ygol Bloch argue that if the text is authentic, it might have been composed either in Babylon or in Tell Umar (where it was most likely excavated), possibly by a scribe who lived immediately after the sack of the former of these two cities. Andrew R. George also accepts its authenticity, though he argues it might have originated in Lower Mesopotamia, possibly in Ur, and assumes that its point of origin might have been misidentified due to erroneous information provided by a modern art dealer.

However, Odette Boivin argues that the colophon is likely an ancient forgery. She proposes that a copyist fabricated it in order to make the traditions of Babylonian glass-makers appear more ancient than in reality. She points out that it anachronistically states the scribe's father was Uššur-ana-Marduk, who was active in the Assyrian court in the fourteenth century BCE. Shiyanti Thavapalan similarly states it was most likely only composed between the fourteen and twelfth centuries BCE, rather than during Gulkišar's reign in the sixteenth. Boivin additionally argues that the year formula attributed in it to Gulkišar is fictional. Similar view has also been expressed by Elyze Zomer.

=== Other attestations ===
Gulkišar's name is attested as a component of the theonym Šamaš-ana-Gulkišar-kurrub (^{d}UTU-ana-Gulkišar-kurub). It can be translated as "Shamash, bless Gulkišar!", and might designate the deified form of the king or a hypostasis of Shamash associated with the royal ancestor cult. Association between the sun god and deceased rulers might reflect an influence of royal ideology of Larsa on the Sealand kings.

A royal hymn dedicated to Gulkišar might have existed, as evidenced by a damaged tablet presently held in Instanbul (Ni 13090). It comes from Nippur and has been dated to the Kassite period.
