= Rejibah =

Archaeological site in Iraq

- Location within Iraq
- 32°7′48″N 46°4′12″E
- Type: settlement
- Periods: Bronze Age
- Location: Dhi Qar Governorate, Iraq

History
- Built: 4th millennium BC

Site notes
- Excavation dates: 1967, 2025-present
- Archaeologists: Henry T. Wright
- Condition: Ruined
- Owner: Public
- Public access: Yes

Rejibah (also Rajibeh or Radhiba or Reijibeh or Reijebeh or Radhibah) is an ancient Near Eastern archaeological site in Dhi Qar Governorate governate in southwest Iraq. It lies 13 kilometers southwest of the ancient city of Ur. The site has been heavily looted, especially the western portions which is damaged to the extent that a geomagnetic archaeological survey is not possible. It has been suggested that the ancient name of the site was Kuwara, thought to be the same city as Ku'ara. Kuwara is unlocated but known to be near ancient Eridu which lies 24 kilometers south-southwest of Ur.

== Archaeology ==
During his 1922-1934 excavations at the ancient city of Ur Leonard Woolley considered working at some peripheral sites, including Rejibah, seeing them as suburbs (or satellites) of Ur. He described Rejibah as being "predominantly at least, of the date of the Third Dynasty of Ur". He also noted another site, location 12 miles northwest of Ur, calling it "Reijibeh X". It was about 100 meters in diameter and less than 2 meters in height. Ubaid period figurines were surface finds at Rejibah X as well as Ubaid pottery, flint hoes, flakes, celts, pounders and grind-stones, and clay sickles.

A number of Rejibah finds from Woolley's effort are held at the Penn Museum. Finds included a door pivot stone with an inscription of Ur III ruler Ur-Namma "Ur-Namma king of Ur, the person who the temple of Ninsun built.", a set of 9 stone inscribed weights, and 23 objects found in a clay coffin. Early 3rd millennium finds included two zoomorphic pendants and a stone stamp seal. Later finds included 4 Neo-Babylonian cuneiform tablets, one complete (legal text recording a loan), 10 cylinder seals, and a number of copper-alloy objects. Standard 9 line inscription bricks of Ur ruler Amar-Sin were noted but not collected.

In 1967 the site was examined as part of an Oriental Institute regional survey led by Henry T. Wright. A Late Uruk /Jemdet Nasr period canal was identified as originating from the Euphrates river then watering the site before proceeding on to the city of Eridu. Buildings with clay cones and kilns were noted. It was described as a large site, 23 hectares overall, consisting of three areas:

- Rejibah Jinub (Survey #4) - 450 meters northwest by 280 meters with a height of 6 meters. Occupation areas from surface survey described as 8.2 hectares in the Jemdet Nasr / Early Dynastic period and 3 hectares in the Late Larsa period.
- Rejibah Shamal (Survey #5) - 550 meters by 225 meters with a height of 2 meters. Occupation described as possible Late Ubaid and Uruk, 12.5 hectares of Jemdet Nasr period and a trace of Late Larsa period.
- Unnamed (Survey #93) - 220 meters northwest by 125 meters with a height of 0.5 meters. Occupation described as possible Ubaid, 2.5 hectares Jemdet Nasr / Early Dynastic and 2.5 hectares Post-Kassite.

It was suggested that the canal is that mentioned in the Sumerian literary composition "Inanna's Journey to Eridu" and that this site would be one of the places named in that text. The sites of Tell Khaiber and Sakheri Kabir also lie on this canal.

In October 2025 a first season of excavations at the site were begun by a EURUK Project (Early Urbanisation: Roots, Unfolding and Kick-off) team. They divided the site into two sectors, in the west Rejibah al-Gharbi (subdivided into Rejibah al-Janoub to the south and Rejibah al-Shamal to the north) and in the east by the canal an area they called Rejibah al-Sharqi. Work consisted of four stratigraphic operations, RJ-1 (10 × 12 meters, large Early Dynastic I period building), RJ-2 (existing robbers pit, Ubaid 6 through Early Dynastic I), RJ-3 (6 × 4 meters, Jemdet Nasr), and RJ-4 (existing robbers pit, Early Dynastic I), all in the western section, and three test trenches, TO-1, TO-2, and TO-3 - location unknown. Future plans include a geophysical investigation of the more lightly looted parts of the site.

== History ==
The site as a whole was first settled in the Late Ubaid period, through the Uruk period, Early Dynastic period, Ur III period, and Isin-Larsa period. Then, possibly after an occupational hiatus, it was settled in the Neo-Babylonan period and the Parthinian period before being abandoned.

== See also ==
- Cities of the ancient Near East
- List of Mesopotamian dynasties
- List of Mesopotamian deities
- Tell Dehaila
