= 21st century BC =

One hundred years, from 2100 BC to 2001 BC

The 21st century BC lasted from the year 2100 BC to 2001 BC.

== Events ==
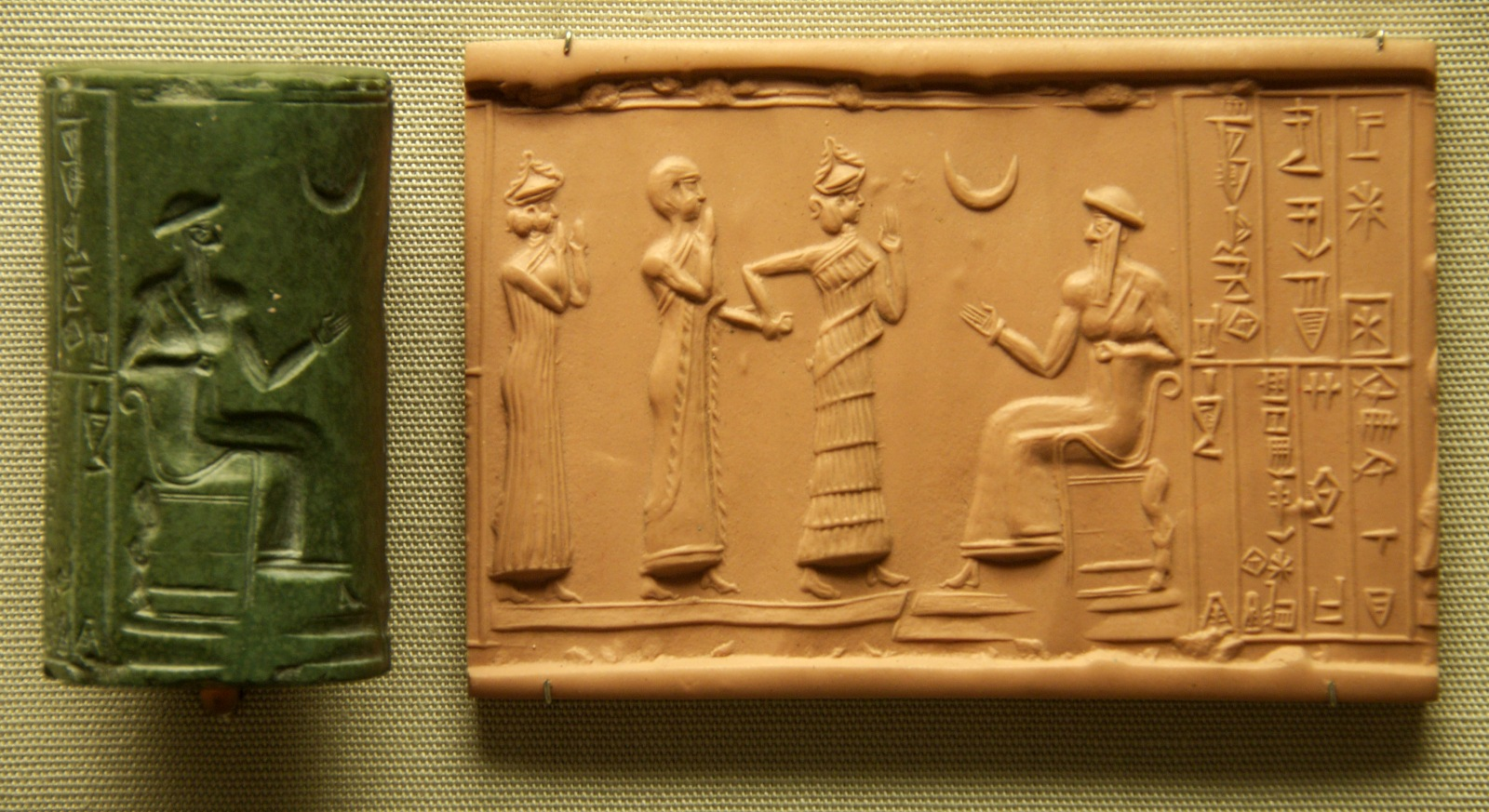
Ur-Nammu (seated) bestows governorship on Ḫašḫamer, patesi (high priest) of Iškun-Sin (cylinder seal impression, ca. 2100 BC).

All dates from this long ago should be regarded as either approximate or conjectural; there are no absolute dates for this time period.

- c. 2150–2040 BC – The First Intermediate Period of Egypt, a period of decline in Egyptian central power.
- c. 2112–2004 BC – The Third Dynasty of Ur. The Ziggurat of Ur is built. Administrative power in Ur is pushed far, with an Ensi, an appointed civil servant, at the head of the constituencies. A meticulous and finicky bureaucracy manages, counts and controls the whole administration, which is as much concerned with the economy as with war or the service of the gods. The weight of such an administration arguably contributes to the collapse of the empire.
- c. 2100–2000 BC:
  - Epic poetry is written in the Sumerian language, including the Epic of Gilgamesh.
  - In Chalcolithic Europe, the two circles of bluestones that form the inner part of Stonehenge are erected.
  - Shahr-e Sukhteh, "The Burnt City" in Persia, is abandoned.
- c. 2100–1900 BC: The beginning of the Middle Minoan civilization in Crete. Bronze metallurgy and the potter's wheel are introduced, as are Cretan hieroglyphs.
- c. 2100–1800 BC – The Sintashta culture emerges in the northern Eurasian Steppe.
- c. 2070 BC – Yu the Great establishes the Xia dynasty in China.
- c. 2050 BC – The beginning of the Middle Kerma culture in Upper Nubia.
- Late spring 2049 BC – Seahenge is built in Britain.
- c. 2040 BC – Mentuhotep II, ruler of the Eleventh Dynasty of Egypt in Thebes, completes the reunification of Egypt following his victory over the pharaohs of Herakleopolis, which marks the beginning of the Middle Kingdom.
- 2025 BC – Naplanum founds the Amorite kingdom of Larsa. (Middle Chronology)
- c. 2017 BC – Ishbi-Erra founds the Amorite kingdom of Isin. (Middle Chronology)
- 2004 BC – Ur sacked by the Elamites, bringing an end to the Third dynasty. (Middle Chronology)
- c. 2000 BC – The earliest bronze age artifacts in Southeast Asia found in the Ban Chiang site in modern-day Thailand indicate the absence of a militaristic or urbanized state.
