= Tell al-Lahm =

Archaeological site in Iraq

- Location within Iraq
- 30°46′27″N 46°21′56″E
- Type: tell
- Location: Dhi Qar Governorate, Iraq
- Region: Mesopotamia

Site notes
- Excavation dates: 1855, 1918, 1949
- Archaeologists: J.E. Taylor, R. Campbell Thompson, F. Safar

Tell al-Lahm (also Tell el-Lahm or Tell el-Lehem or Tell Al-Laham) is an archaeological site in Dhi Qar Governorate (Iraq). It is 32 km (20 mi) southeast of the site of ancient Ur. Its ancient name is not known with certainty, with Kuara, Kisig, and Dur-Iakin having been proposed. Durum was also suggested but has since been discounted. Today the Euphrates River is 18 km (11 mi) away, but in antiquity, it ran by the site (or a branch of it did), continuing to flow there until the Muslim Era.

== Archaeology ==
The site is oblong with an extent of 350 meters by 300 meters, consisting of one main mound with some peripheral ridges and depressions, and near a dry canal bed. The surface is irregular due to use in modern times as a cemetery and from local Bedouin camping and digging defensive trenches. The mound rises to about 15 meters. Around the main mound are a number of low (less than 2 meters) mounds, mostly from much later occupation. The largest, 30 meters to the northeast, has about the same area as the main mound. The site is surrounded by the remains of a city wall, which had circular buttresses at the corners.

The location was excavated for a few days in 1855 by John George Taylor. After digging a number of deep trenches, he found no buildings, only the remnants of a few brick pavements, and a single cuneiform tablet. The brick inscriptions were too defaced to read. He also found a number of graves from later periods. The content or the disposition of the tablet is unclear. While working at Eridu for the British Museum in 1918, R. Campbell Thompson excavated there briefly, finding two bricks of the Neo-Babylonian ruler Nabonidus and one of the Ur III Empire ruler Bur-Sin. There was a sizable Neo-Babylonian settlement to the east of the site (later worked by Fuad Safar), so it is uncertain if the Nabonidus brick is in its original location.

In more modern times, Fuad Safar conducted soundings at Tell al-Lahm in 1949. Six deep soundings were dug on the main mound, providing a detailed stratigraphy of the site. The main mound ranged from a substantial settlement in the Early Dynastic period at the lowest level to a smaller settlement in Kassite period in the final levels. The first sounding found an inscribed brick of Bur-Sin. Small pits excavated on the large low mound to the northeast found some Neo-Assyrian remains, including a cylinder seal and the rim of a stone vase (thought to be from the main mound originally) inscribed with "^{d}Shu-nir". Five soundings were also conducted on the low mound. It found remains of a large building, a few fragmentary cuneiform tablets (disposition unclear), a figurine (thought to be of the god Nabu), and a damaged baked clay cylinder of Nabonidus. At the upper level, three blackish partly baked tablets (disposition unclear) were found, two with a date of Achaemenid Empire king Darius. No transcriptions or translations of epigraphy were reported. Three bathtub shaped terracotta coffins were found.

In 1965 the site (as EP-172) was examined as part of the Southern Margins of Sumer Survey. It was described as being 390 meters by 310 meters and 13 meters in height. Air photograph showed town wall. Occupation was described as Early Dynastic c. 5 hectares), Akkadian (c. 5 hectares), Ur III-Early Larsa (c. 8 hectares), Late Larsa (c. 8 hectares), and Cassite-Post-Cassite (c 11 hectares).

The inscription on the Nabonidus cylinder (in literature referred to as "Nabonidus Cylinder II, 6", "[Nabonidus] Inscription 10", and the "Eamaškuga Cylinder"), which figures heavily in debates about the site's original name, reads:

"Nabonidus, king of Babylon, the attentive prince chosen by the god Marduk, the one who provides for Esagil and Ezida ... At that time, (with regard to) Eamaškuga the temple of the goddess Ningal — the pure lady of everything — the pure sheepfold that is inside the city Kissik, which a long time ago had become weak (and) whose walls had buckled, [I removed] its [buckled] walls that had become weak [and (then)] I examined (and) [checked its original] foundation(s) and (thereby) secu[red its brickwork] on top of [its original foundation(s).] (lacuna) [O Ningal, ...], the [pure] l[ady of everything,]... when you are] joyous[ly dwelling] in E[maškuga], which is inside [the city Kissik], speak good things about [Nabonidus], the king ..."

An earlier epigrapher had translated the key phrase "the pure sheepfold that is inside the city Kissik" as "which is within Dur", sparking speculation about "Dur" and its implication for the name of the city. Another epigrapher suggest the goddess Annunitum rather than Ningal.

The inscribed brick of Ur III ruler Amar-Sin read:

"Amar-Suena, the one called by name by the god Enlil in Nippur, supporter of the temple of the god Enlil, mighty man, king of Ur, king of the four quarters."

In 2008, a team of Iraqi and British Museum archaeologists assessing damage to archaeological sites in Iraq visited Tell al-Lahm. They found numerous looting holes and significant damage from military activity and the remains of tank emplacements.

== History ==
The earliest known occupation at the site is in the Early Dynastic period. Occupation was extensive in the following Akkadian Empire period, Ur III period, Isin-Larsa period, Old Babylonian period, and Kassite period. Afterward, the site showed at most modest occupation (Neo-Babylonian and Neo-Assyrian on a 30-meter distant low mound), aside from later use as a cemetery.

== Name ==
One researcher, based on the recovered cylinder of Nabonidus, contended that Tell al-Lahm was the site of the 1st-millennium BCE city of Kisik. The primary argument is based on the mention of the E-amas-ku-ga temple of Ningal in that cylinder. Another researcher based this on the fact that there is thought to have been an E-amas-ku-ga temple of Istar in Kisig which has been proposed as the earlier name for Kisik. Based on the possible mention of a "Dur" in the Nabonidus cylinder an epigrapher proposed that the 1st Millennium BC name of the site was Dur-Iakin. a fortress of the Sealands belonging to the Bit-Iakin tribe. The possibility of being named Kuura in the Early Dynastic period is somewhat more tenuous. It relies on 1) the reading of Annunitum instead of Ningal in the Nabonidus cylinder, 2) that Annunitum is an epitaph of Istar, 3) that a temple of Istar with the name E-amas-ku-ga was thought to be in Kisik, and 4) the possibility that Kuara was an earlier name for Kisik.

=== Dur-Iakin ===
Dur refers to a fortress in Akkadian, so Dur-Iakin is the "Fortress of the Iakin", more formally the Bit-Iakin (also Bit-Yakin). The name is only attested in the 1st Millennium BC. Its most notable occurrence is from the battles between the Neo-Assyrian ruler Sargon II and the Neo-Babylonian (sometimes called Chaldean) ruler Marduk-apla-iddina II. Marduk-apla-iddina II, who is the Merodach-Baladan of the Hebrew Bible, rallied opposition to Sargon, including the Bit-Iakin, at Dur-Iakin, digging a canal to the Euphrates for water. In 709 BC Sargon, according to Assyrian sources, sieged and then in 707 BC destroyed Dur-Iakin, deported its populace, and took away its gods, though Marduk-apla-iddina II escaped to Elam and lived to fight another day.

=== Kisik/Kisig ===
Also, sometimes Kissik. It is mostly attested in the 1st Millennium BC with one possible mention in the early 2nd Millennium BC. It has been suggested that the city was named Kisik, usually spelled syllabically but also logographically (EZENxKU_{7}^{ki}) in the 1st millennium BC, but had been named Kisig (EZENxSIG^{ki}) in earlier periods. A calendar of Neo-Babylonian ruler Nebuchadnezzar II mentions sangu (high priests) of Kissik. It is believed to have been in the region controlled by the Bit-Iakin, like Dur-Iakin. One researcher suggested that the residence of the early 2nd Millennium BC Isin-Larsa period ruler Naplanum was at Kisig and that the city was Amorite. In the time of Neo-Assyrian ruler Ashurbanipal (669–631 BC) the Elamite ruler Nabu-bel-shumate carried away some citizens of Kisig and as a result that town swore an oath to Ashurbanipal and provided troops. They later complained that their troops were not being treated well. Sargon II (722–705 BC) awarded andurāru status to "Dēr, Ur, Uruk, Eridu, Larsa, Kullab, Kisik, and Nemed-Laguda".

=== Kuara (Ku'ara) ===
Personal names such as Lú-a.ḫaki "The man from Kuara" are known in the Early Dynastic period. It is mentioned in the Early Dynastic Zame Hymns. A door socket from the Akkadian Empire period was found at an unexcavated site reading "Manistusu, king of Kis, builder of the temple of the goddess Ninhursaga in HA.A KI. Whoever removes this tablet, may Ninhursaga and Samas uproot his seed and destroy his progeny." It has been proposed that HA.A KI was Kuara.

In a Ur III empire period a tablet from Puzrish-Dagan lists an ensi (governor) of Ku'ara as Enlil-zisagal. Several researchers have suggested that the name of the city evolved, becoming Kuwara and then later Kumari.

Kuara was the cult center of Asarluhi, a god regarded as a son of Enki (Ea). In the Old Babylonian period, he was equated with Marduk, previously an insignificant local god of Babylon, which resulted in the latter similarly starting to be addressed as a son of Enki. One of the Temple Hymns of Enheduana, daughter of Akkadian Empire ruler Sargon of Akkad included a section dedicated to Kuara and its tutelary god:

"City. Like grain, you grew from the Deep Sea. You took your cosmic powers from the cloud-covered steppe. Kuara, you are the foundation for a worthy hall. Your lord does not hold back his gifts. ... Asarluhi, son of the Deep Sea, has built a home in your holy court, House of Kuara, and has taken his seat upon your throne. Eleven lines. House of Asarluhi in Kuara"

According to various sources other deities worshiped in Ku'ara included Lugal-eri-saga, Lugal-nita-zi(d) and Ensi-mah (in the Ur III period), (Nin-)ges-zida, and Ninsun (built by Ur III ruler Ur-Namma). A tablet from Puzrish-Dagan dated to the reign of Ibbi-Sin indicates that only Ninsun, Asalluḫi and Nindamana actually had temples in Ku'ara with three other deities, Ḫaia, Nindamgalnuna, and Martu, also receiving offerings in the temple of Nindamana. It has been suggested that Martu might have been an early form of Marduk. An obscure god, Ab-u₂, received offerings at the temple of Ninsun. The deified Ur III ruler Šulgi received offerings at the temple of Asalluḫi in Kuara. The governor of Irisaĝrig reports making offerings at Kuara. The Ur III ruler Ibbi-Sin also made offerings there. A text from the Sealand Dynasty lists temples at Kuara. The obscure god Ensigalabzu is mentioned in a text in association with Kuara.

According to the Sumerian King List, Dumuzid, the fisherman, the legendary third king of Uruk, came from Kuara; he is to be distinguished from the god Dumuzid, who also appears in this text as "Dumuzid the shepherd", described as a king of Bad-Tibira.

Based on city seals it has been proposed that in the Uruk III period Kuara was part of a temple based trading group based on the city of Uruk which included the cities of Ur, Larsa, Nippur, Keš, and Zabala.

In the Early Dynastic IIIa period, it was included in a list of territories controlled by the city of Uruk under ruler Lumma.

Kuara is mentioned in the Lament for Sumer and Ur "On that day, the storm forced people to live in darkness. In order to destroy Kuara, it forced people to live in darkness. Ninehama in her fear wept bitter tears. 'Alas the destroyed city, my destroyed house,' she cried bitterly. Asarluhi put his robes on with haste and ....... Lugalbanda took an unfamiliar path away from his beloved dwelling. (1 ms. adds: Ninsun .......) "Alas the destroyed city, my destroyed house," she cried bitterly".

It has been suggested that Kuara was also the name of a district of the city of Babylon and also that a later name for Kuara is Kumar/Kumari.

In the Sumerian literary composition Inana and Bilulu: an ulila to Inana it is said to be the birthplace of the goddess Geshtinanna "... My goddess, born in Kuara, the maiden who is the crown of all ……, the admiration and acclaim of the black-headed people, the playful one who also voices laments and the cries, who intercedes before the king -- Ĝeštin-ana, the lady ...".

On the assumption that Kuwara was the same city, the site of Rejibah has been suggested as the location of Kuara.

== See also ==
- Cities of the Ancient Near East
