= Reginald Campbell Thompson =

British archaeologist (1876–1941)

- Portrait by Walter Stoneman, 1934
- Born: 21 August 1876; London, England
- Died: 23 May 1941 (aged 64); Moulsford, Berkshire, England
- Resting place: St Leonard's Churchyard, Sunningwell, Berkshire
- Education: Colet Court, St Paul's School
- Alma mater: Caius College, Cambridge
- Known for: Excavations at Nineveh
- Spouse: Barbara Brodrick Robinson (m. 1911)
- Children: 3
- Scientific career
- Fields: Archaeology; Assyriology; cuneiform

Reginald Campbell Thompson (21 August 1876 – 23 May 1941) was a British archaeologist, Assyriologist and cuneiformist. He excavated at Nineveh, Ur, Nebo, Carchemish and other sites.

== Biography ==
Thompson was born at Cranley Place, South Kensington, the eldest of five children of Dr. Reginald Edward Thompson (1834–1912) and Anne Isabella De Morgan, and educated at Colet Court, St Paul's School and Caius College, Cambridge, where he read oriental (Hebrew and Aramaic) languages.

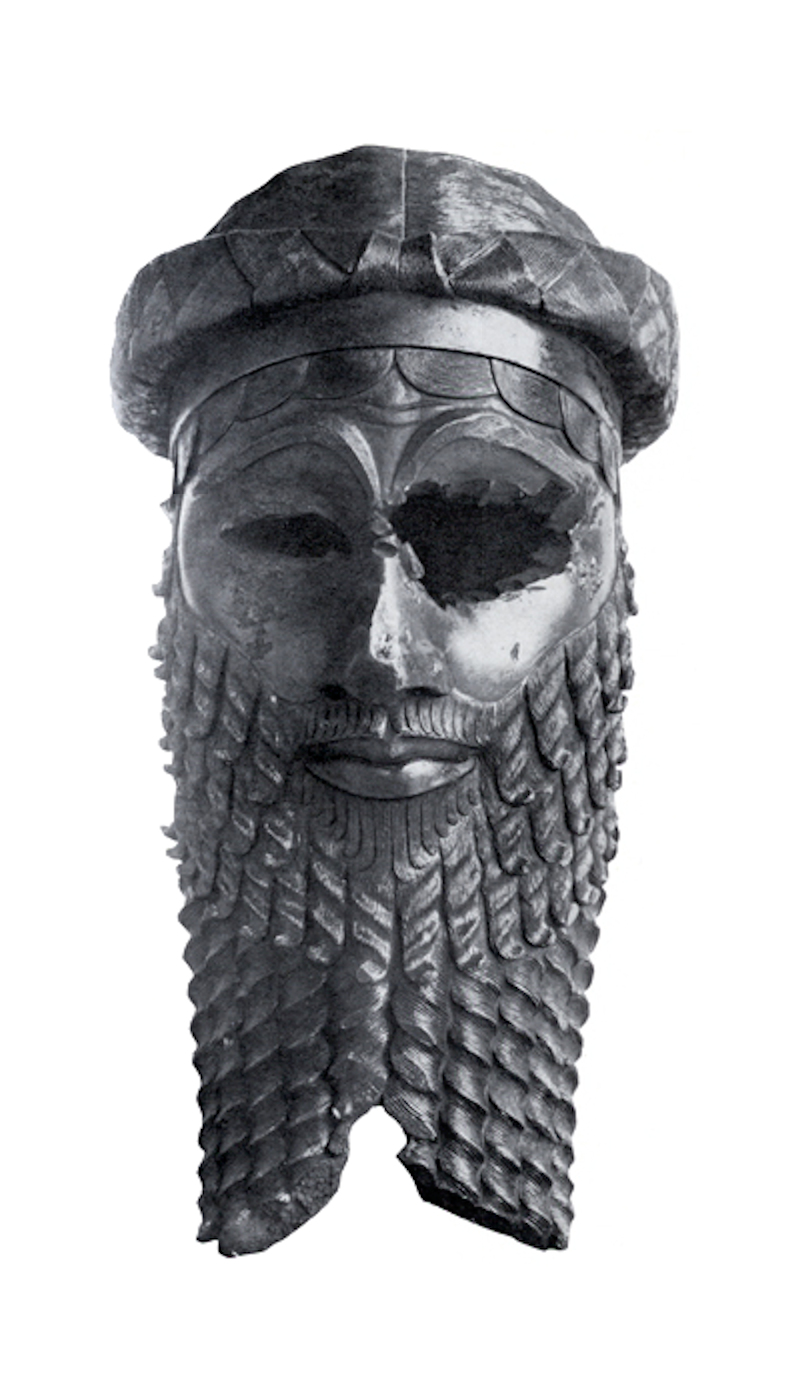
Bronze head of an Akkadian king unearthed in Nineveh by Campbell Thompson's team

In 1904 he found the remains of the temple of Nabu in Nineveh. In 1910 he recruited T E Lawrence to be the pottery expert for his Mesopotamia dig. In 1918 Mesopotamia became a possession of the UK, and the trustees of the British Museum applied to have an archaeologist attached to the army in the field to protect antiquities from harm. As a captain in the Intelligence Service serving in the region and a former assistant of the British Museum, R. C. Thompson was recommended by Lawrence and Gertrude Bell to start the work. After a brief investigation of Ur, he dug at Shahrain and the mounds at Tell al-Lahm.

After the First World War he had a fellowship with Merton College, Oxford. Thompson was a member of the Royal Asiatic Society, and left to them two canisters of film. "The footage dates from the late 1920s/early 1930s and shows excavations in Iraq at the mound of Kouyunjik, scenes in the village of Nebi Yunus, across the Khosr river from Kouyunjik within the ancient city boundaries of Nineveh, and scenes in the city of Mosul, across the river Tigris from Nineveh". The film was digitised in 2016.

The writer Agatha Christie and her husband the archaeologist Max Mallowan were invited by Thompson to the excavation site at Nineveh in 1931. She dedicated her story Lord Edgware Dies to "Dr and Mrs Campbell Thompson". In return he dedicated his melodrama in blank verse Digger's Fancy to "Agatha and Max Mallowan".

== Appointments ==
- 1899–1905 Assistant in the Egyptian and Assyrian Dept. of the British Museum.
- 1906 Sudan Survey Dept.
- 1907–9 Assistant Professor in Semitic Languages, University of Chicago.
- 1914–19 Served in Mesopotamia (Captain, Special List; mentioned four times in despatches).
- 1923–41 Fellow of Merton College, Oxford.
- 1937–41 Shillito Reader in Assyriology at Oxford.

== Personal life ==
Reginald Campbell Thompson married Barbara Brodrick Robinson at St John’s, Putney on 19 September 1911. They had three children: Yoland(e) in 1914, Reginald Perronet in 1919 and John De Morgan in 1923. Reginald Perronet was a Flight Lieutenant in the Royal Air Force Reserves (RAFVR), and was killed on active service on 4 April 1941. A memorial service was held at New College, Oxford on 14 June 1941.

Thompson died on 23 May 1941 at Sowberry Court, Moulsford, aged 64. He lost his life while serving in the Home Guard, during a patrol on the River Thames. His obituary in The Times said of him "Personally Thompson was of a fine, robust build, who could shoot, swim or sail a boat with anybody. The Norfolk broads were a haunt of his at one time, and at Oxford he kept a skiff of his own on the river".

Barbara accompanied her husband on site for all four seasons of work at Nineveh. She died on 25 June 1971, aged 84. Reginald, Barbara and their first son are buried at Sunningwell, close to the family home at Boars Hill.

== Bibliography ==
- The Reports of the Magicians and Astrologers of Nineveh and Babylon. Two volumes. London, Luzac and Co., 1900.
- On Traces of an Indefinite Article in Assyrian. London, David Nutt, 1902.
- The Devils and Evil Spirits of Babylonia, 2 vols. London, Luzac, 1903–1904.
- Late Babylonian Letters: Transliterations and Translations of a Series of Letters Written in Babylonian Cuneiform, Chiefly during the Reigns of Nabonidus, Cyrus, Cambyses, and Darius. London, Luzac, 1906.
- Semitic Magic: its Origins and Development. London, 1908.
- A Pilgrim's Scrip;. London, John Lane The Bodley Head, 1915.
- Archaeologia, Vol LXX (1921)
- Assyrian Medical Texts: from the Originals in the British Museum. London, Oxford University Press, 1923.
- The Assyrian Herbal. London, Luzac and Co., 1924.
- A Century of Exploration at Nineveh. London, Luzac, 1929. Joint author: Richard Wyatt Hutchinson.
- The Epic of Gilgamish, text, transliteration and notes, 1930.
- The Prisms of Esarhaddon and Ashurbanipal found at Nineveh, 1927-8. London, British Museum, 1931
- A Dictionary of Assyrian Chemistry and Geology. Oxford, Clarendon Press, 1936

Fiction

- A Song of Araby (1921 as John Guisborough)
- A Mirage of Sheba (1923 as John Guisborough)
- Digger's Fancy: a Melodrama. London, Sidgwick & Jackson, 1938.

== Sources ==
- British Museum collections
- Harry Reginald Holland Hall, A season's work at Ur, Al-'Ubaid, Abu Shahrain (Eridu) and Elsewhere, Being an Unofficial Account of the British Museum Archaeological Mission to Babylonia, 1919, Methuen, 1930.
