= Lugal-kinishe-dudu =

Sumerian king, 25th century BC

Lugal-kinishe-dudu 𒈗𒆠𒉌𒂠𒌌𒌌
- King of Ur; King of Kish
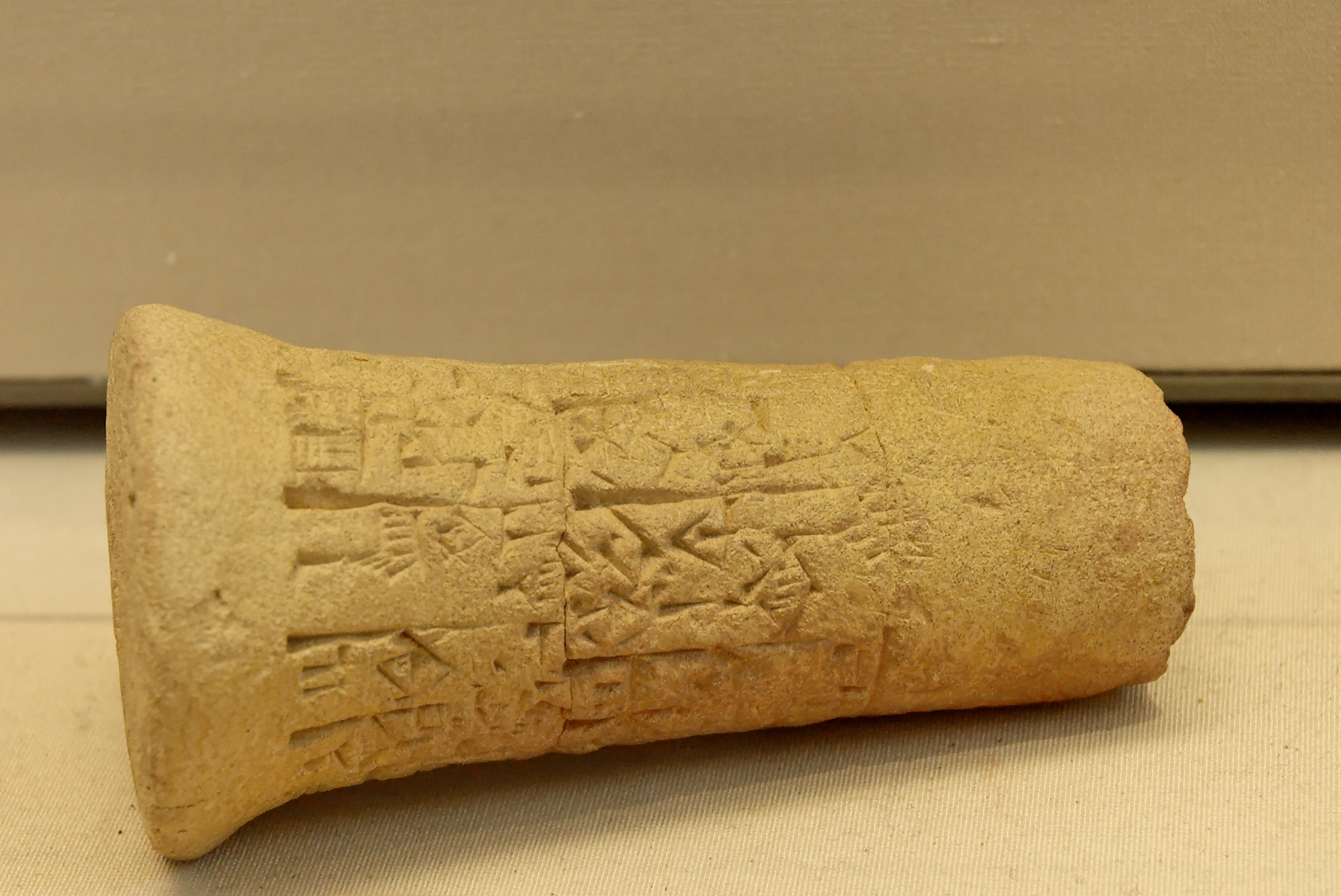
- Foundation nail dedicated by Entemena, king of Lagash, to the god of Bad-Tibira, about the peace treaty concluded between Lagash and Uruk. Extract from the inscription: "Those were the days when Entemena, ruler of Lagash, and Lugal-kinishe-dudu, ruler of Uruk, concluded a treaty of fraternity". This text is the oldest diplomatic document known. Found in Telloh, ancient Girsu, ca. 2400 BC. Louvre Museum.

King of Uruk
- Reign: c. 2400 BC
- Predecessor: Possibly Urzage
- Successor: Lugal-kisalsi
- Issue: Lugal-kisalsi
- Dynasty: Second Dynasty of Uruk

Location of Uruk

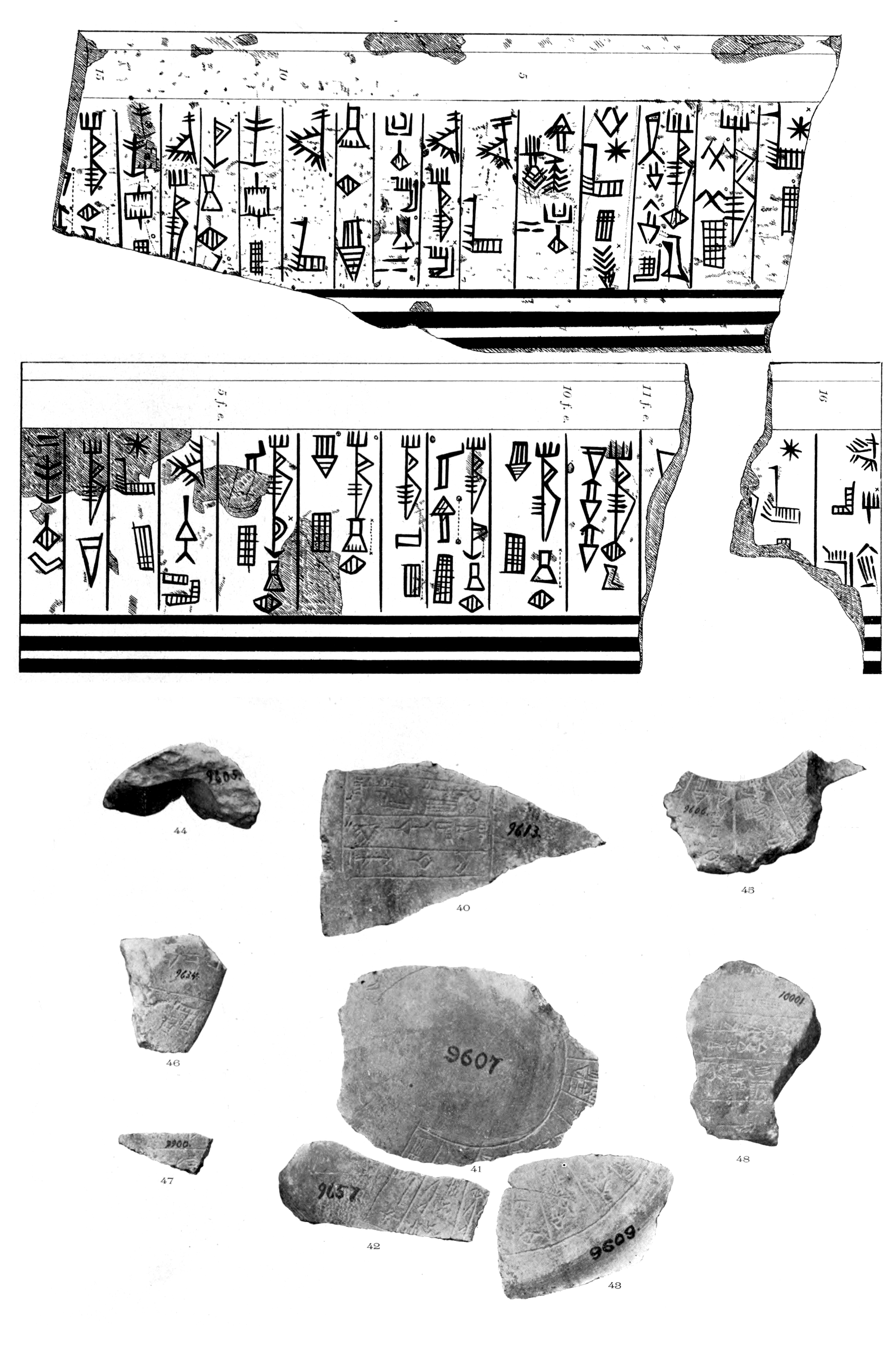
Vase inscription of Lugal-kigine-dudu (𒈗𒆠𒁺𒉌𒌌𒌌, lugal-ki-gin-ne_{2}-du₇-du₇), reconstruction of the text, and some fragments

Lugal-kinishe-dudu (𒈗𒆠𒉌𒂠𒌌𒌌, lugal-ki-ni-še₃-du₇-du₇) also Lugal-kiginne-dudu (𒈗𒆠𒁺𒉌𒌌𒌌, lugal-ki-gin-ne_{2}-du₇-du₇; fl. c. 2400 BC), was a King and (ensi) of Uruk and Ur who lived towards the end of the 25th century BC. The Sumerian King List mentions Lugal-kinishe-dudu as the second king of the dynasty after En-shakansha-ana, attributing to him a fanciful reign of 120 years.

The inscriptions of this sovereign which have been discovered show that he retained the power inherited from his predecessor, since he proclaimed himself king of Ur and Kish:

"For An, king of all the lands, and for Inanna, mistress of Eanna. Lugalkiginnedudu, the king of Kish. When Inana gave to Lugalkiginnedudu en-ship in addition to kingship, she allowed him to exercise en-ship in Uruk, and she allowed him to exercise kingship in Ur."

— Inscription of Lugal-kinishe-dudu.

Numerous fragments are known that bear the name of Lugalkinishedudu, mainly found in Nippur, and now located in the University of Pennsylvania Museum of Archaeology and Anthropology.

The most remarkable document in which he is mentioned is a clay nail found in Girsu and commemorating the alliance which he concluded with Entemena of Lagash, the oldest known reference to a peace treaty between two kings:

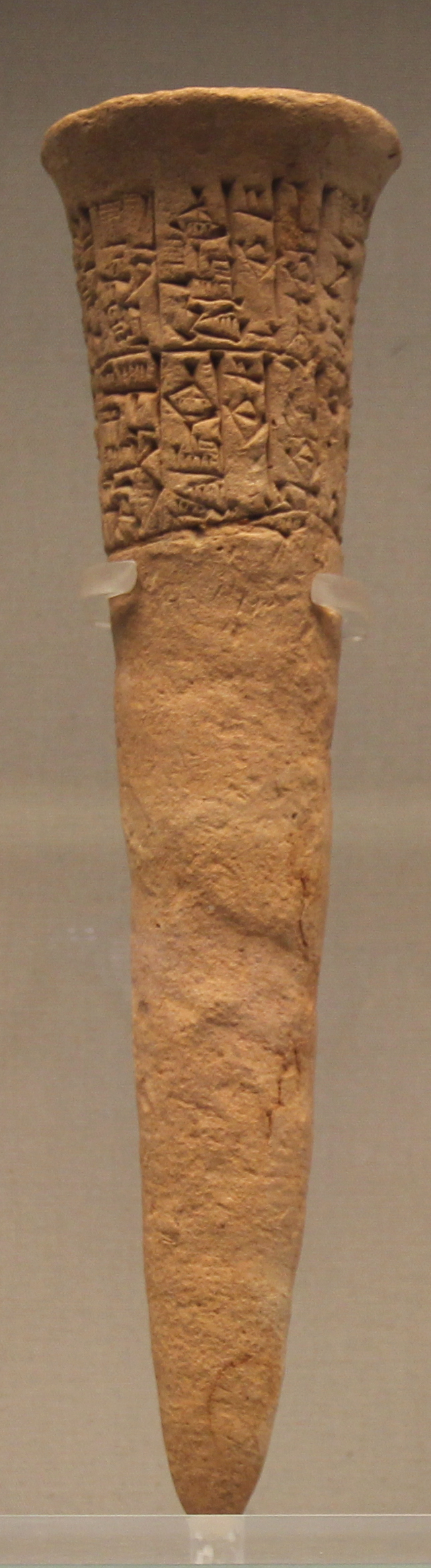
Cone of Entemena mentioning the alliance with Lugal-kinishe-dudu

1st line:
^{D}inanna-ra / ^{D}lugal-e2-muš3-ra / en-mete-na / ensi2 / lagaški-ke4 / e2-muš3 e2 ki-ag2-ga2-ne-ne / mu-ne-du3 / KIBgunû mu-na-du11 / en-mete-na / lu2 e2-muš3 du3-a
2nd line:
^{D}-ra-ni / dšul-utul12-am6 / u4-ba en-mete-na / ensi2 / lagaški / lugal-ki-ne2-eš2-du7-du7 / ensi2 / unuki-bi / nam-šeš e-ak

1st line:
"For Inanna / and Lugal-emuš / Enmetena / ruler / of Lagaš, / the E-muš, their beloved temple, / built / and ordered (these) clay nails for them. / Enmetena, / who built the E-muš,"
2nd line:
"his personal god / is Šul-utul. / At that time, Enmetena, / ruler / of Lagaš, / and Lugal-kineš-dudu, / ruler / of Uruk, / established brotherhood."

— Alliance treaty between Entemena and Lugal-kinishe-dudu.

He was followed by his son, Lugal-kisalsi, also read Lugaltarsi.

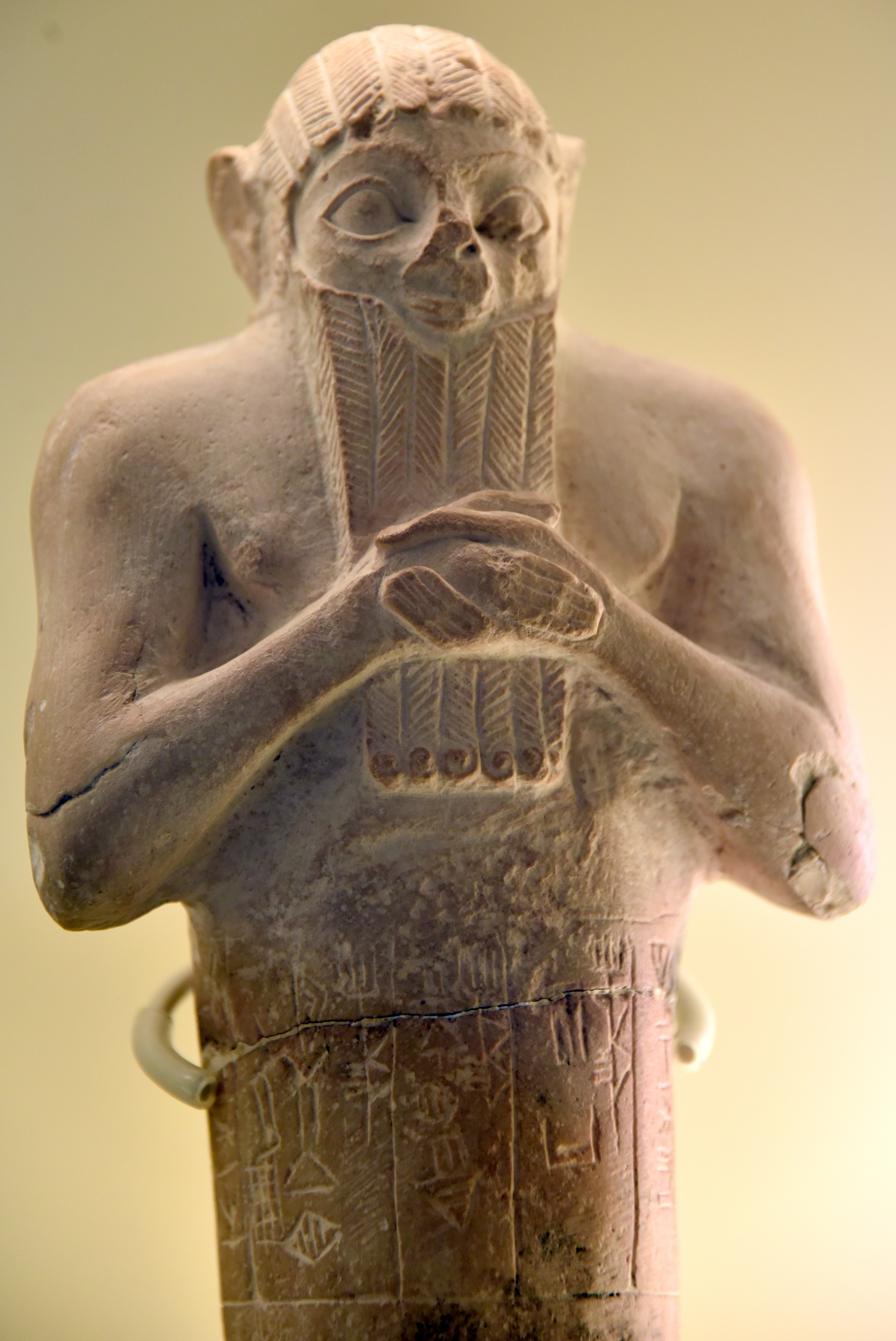
Lugal-kisalsi was the son of Lugal-kinishe-dudu

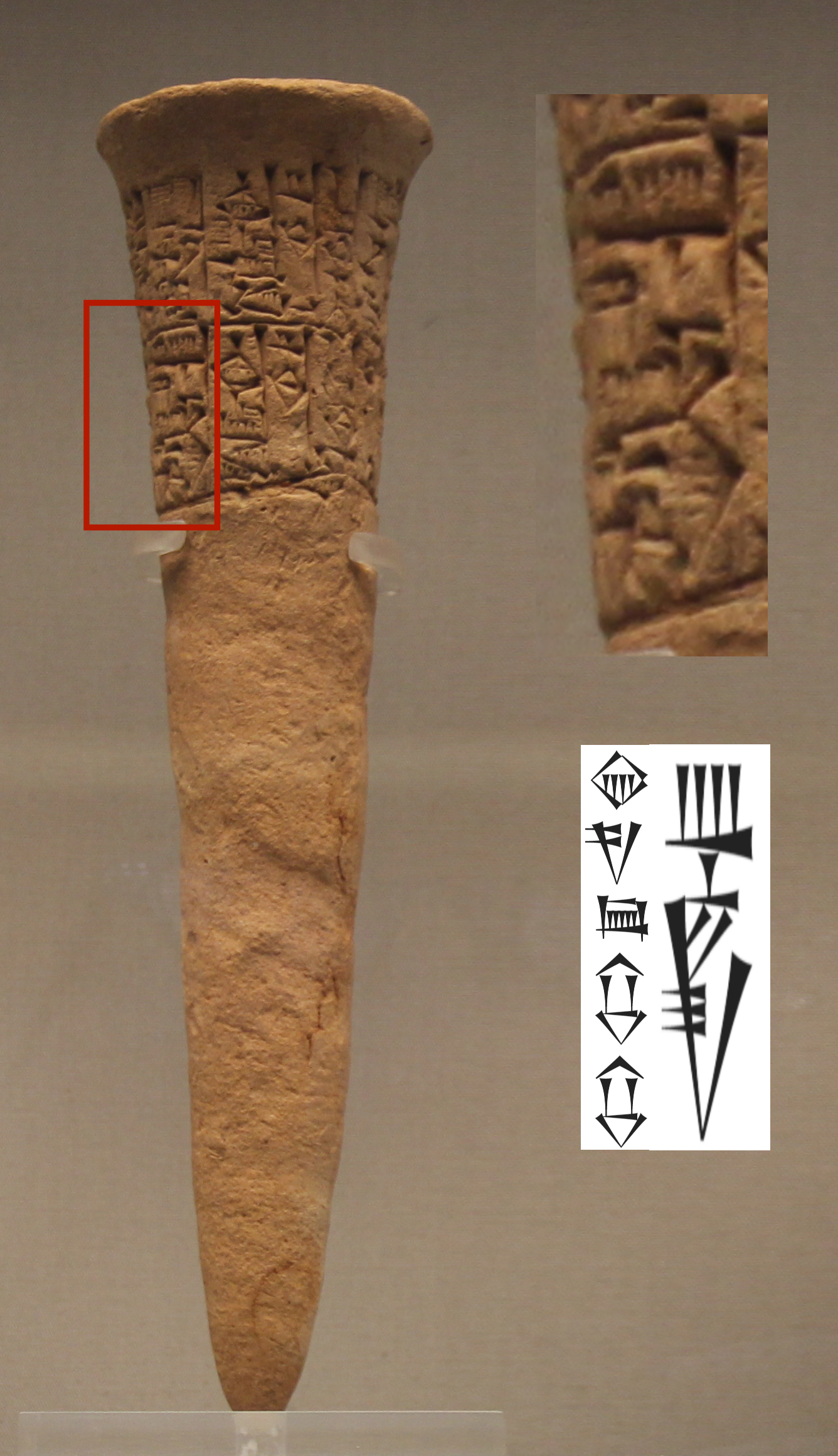
The name "Lugal-kinishe-dudu" on the Treaty Cone of Entemena. British Museum

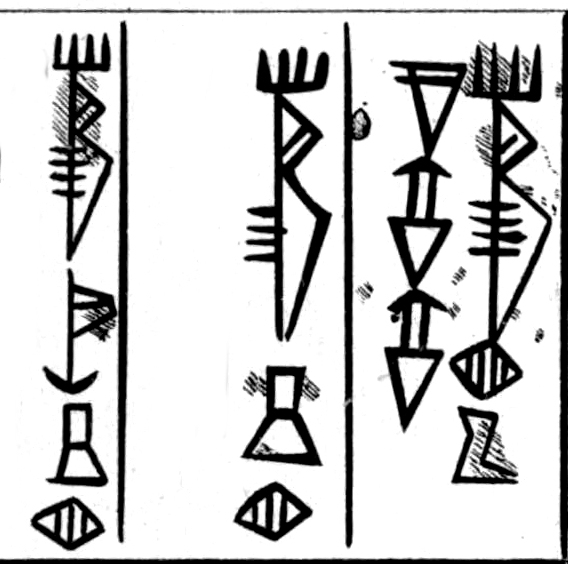
"Lugal-kinishe-dudu / King of Uruk /King of Ur" on the vase inscription

== See also ==
- History of Sumer
- Sumerian king list

Regnal titles
Preceded by Possibly Urzage	King of Uruk c. 2400 BC	Succeeded by Lugal-kisalsi
