= Lugal-kisalsi =

Sumerian king, 25th century BC

Lugal-kisalsi 𒈗𒆦𒋛
- King of Ur; King of Kish
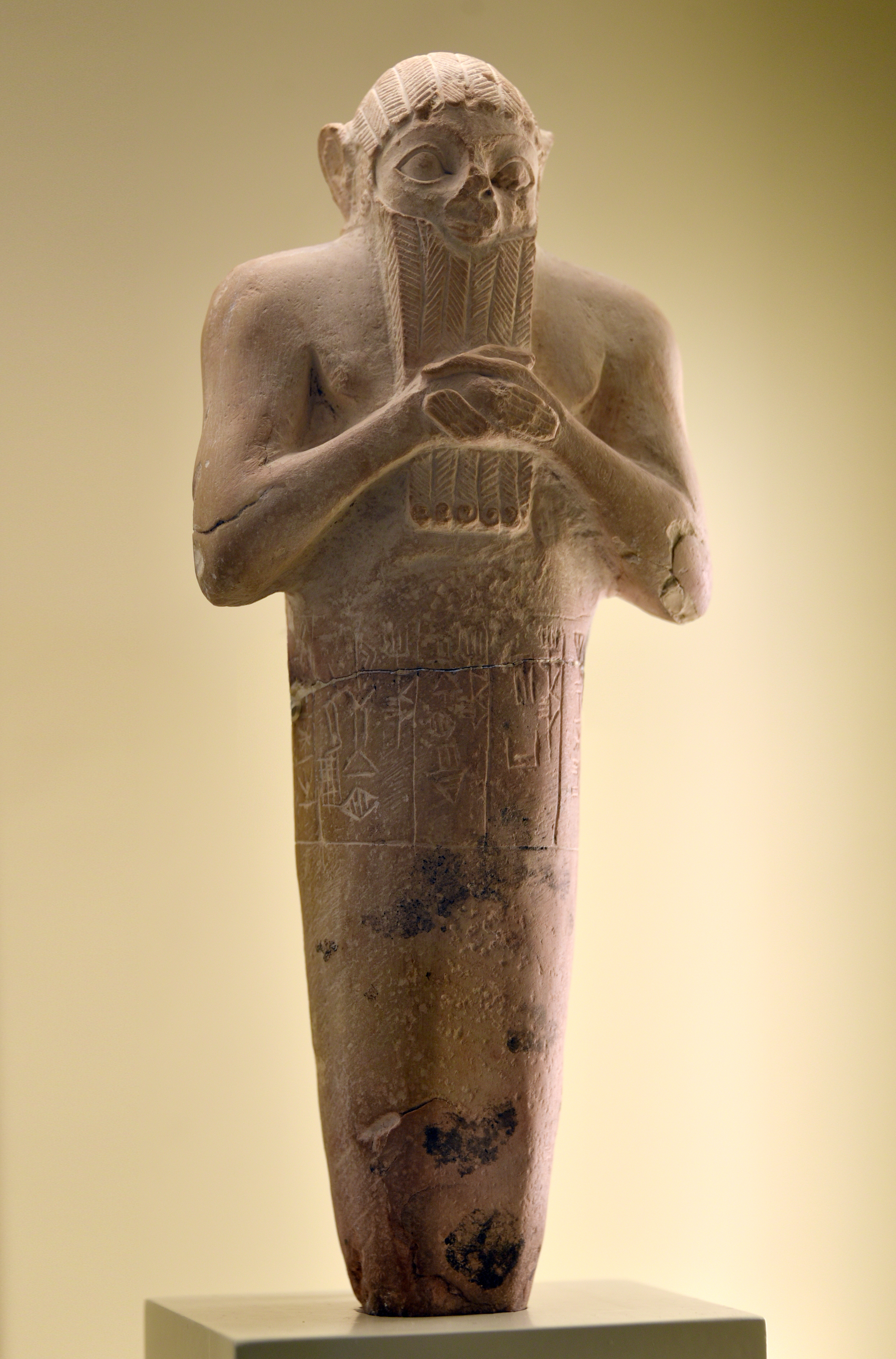
- Limestone foundation peg of Lugal-kisalsi, from Uruk, Iraq. c. 2380 BCE. Pergamon Museum VA 4855. The inscription reads "For (goddess) Nammu, wife of (the god) An, Lugalkisalsi, King of Uruk, King of Ur, erected this temple of Namma".

King of Uruk
- Reign: c. 2400 BC
- Predecessor: Lugal-kinishe-dudu
- Successor: Possibly Urni
- Issue: Lubarasi
- Dynasty: Second Dynasty of Uruk
- Father: Lugal-kinishe-dudu

Location of Uruk, Ur, and Kish

Lugal-kisalsi, also Lugaltarsi (𒈗𒆦𒋛, lugal-kisal-si, also 𒈗𒋻𒋛, lugal-tar-si, lugal-sila-si; fl. c. 2400 BC) was a King of Uruk and Ur who lived towards the end of the 25th century BC, succeeding his father Lugal-kinishe-dudu, according to contemporary inscriptions, although he does not appear in the Sumerian King List (but his father does in some versions). In one of his inscriptions, he appears as "Lugalkisalsi, the first-born son of Lugalkigenedudu, king of Uruk and Ur".

He had a son named Lubarasi, and a grandson named Silim-Utu. Numerous inscriptions in his name are known.

== Inscriptions ==
Lugal-kisalsi is known from several inscriptions. Lugal-kisalsi was also called "King of Kish" in some of his inscriptions:

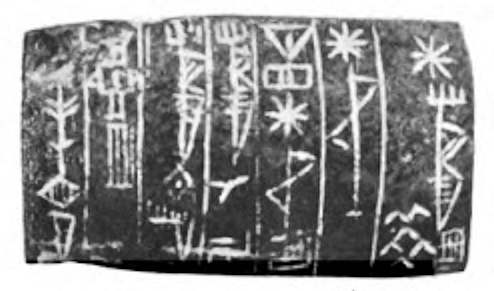

𒀭𒈗𒆳𒆳𒊏 / 𒀭𒈹 / 𒊩𒌆𒀭𒈹𒊏 / 𒈗𒋻𒋛 / 𒈗𒆧𒆠 / 𒂦𒆦 / 𒈬𒈾𒆕

an lugal kur-kur-ra / {d}inanna / nin AN MUSZ3-ra / lugal-sila-si / lugal kisz / bad3 kisal / mu-na-du3

"For An, king of all the lands, and for Inanna, queen of ..., Lugaltarsi, king of Kish, built the wall of the courtyard."

— Inscription of Lugal-kisalsi.

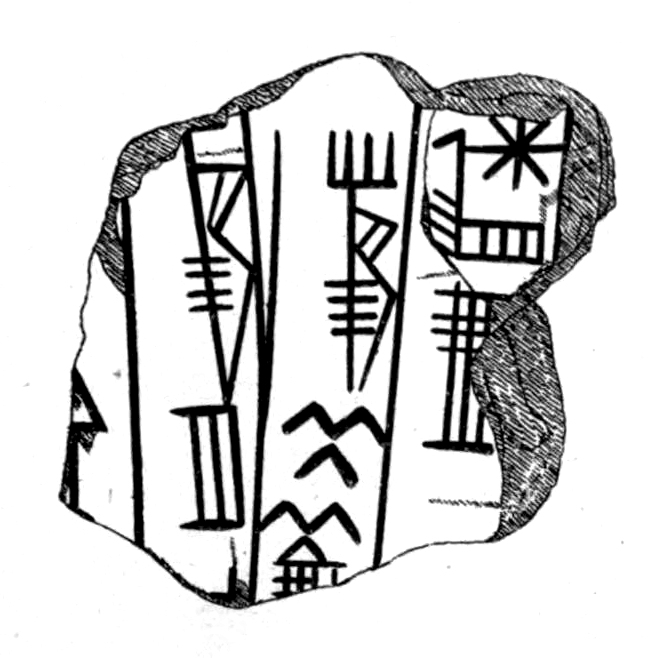
A vase fragment with the name "Lugal-kisal-(si)": {d}en-lil / lugal kur-kur-ra / lugal-kisal-si / [dumu]-sag# (𒀭𒂗𒆤 / 𒈗𒆳𒆳𒊏 / 𒈗𒆦𒋛 / 𒌉𒊕) "For Enlil, king of all the lands, by Lugalkisalsi, the first-born son [of Lugalkigenedudu, king of Uruk and Ur]".

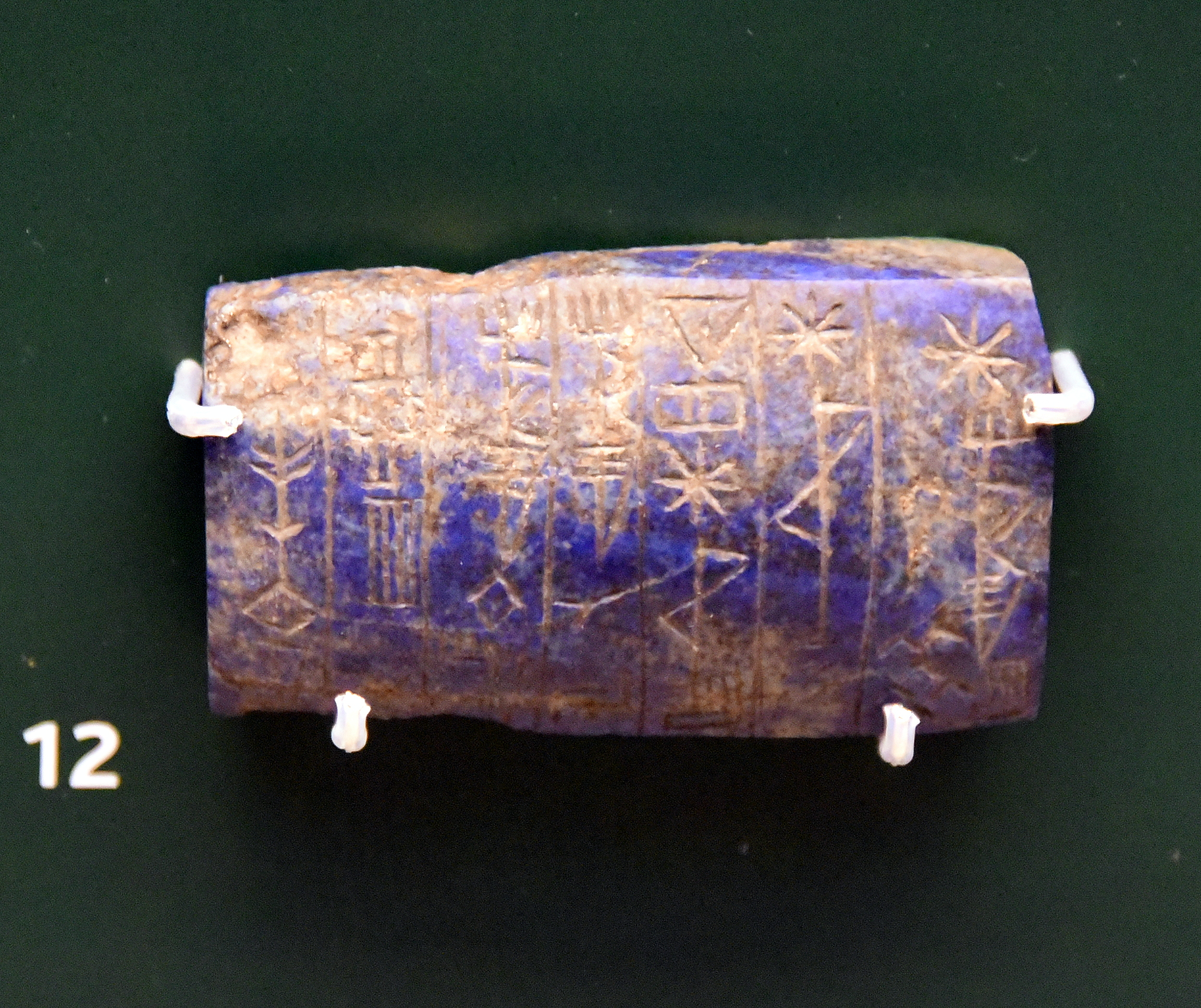
Votive tablet of Lugal-kisalsi, recording that he built the courtyard wall of a temple complex for the gods An and Inanna. British Museum, BM 91013.

== Statuary ==
Lugal-kisalsi is known for a foundation peg with effigy and inscription, and several similar statuettes, although without inscriptions. The foundation peg reads:

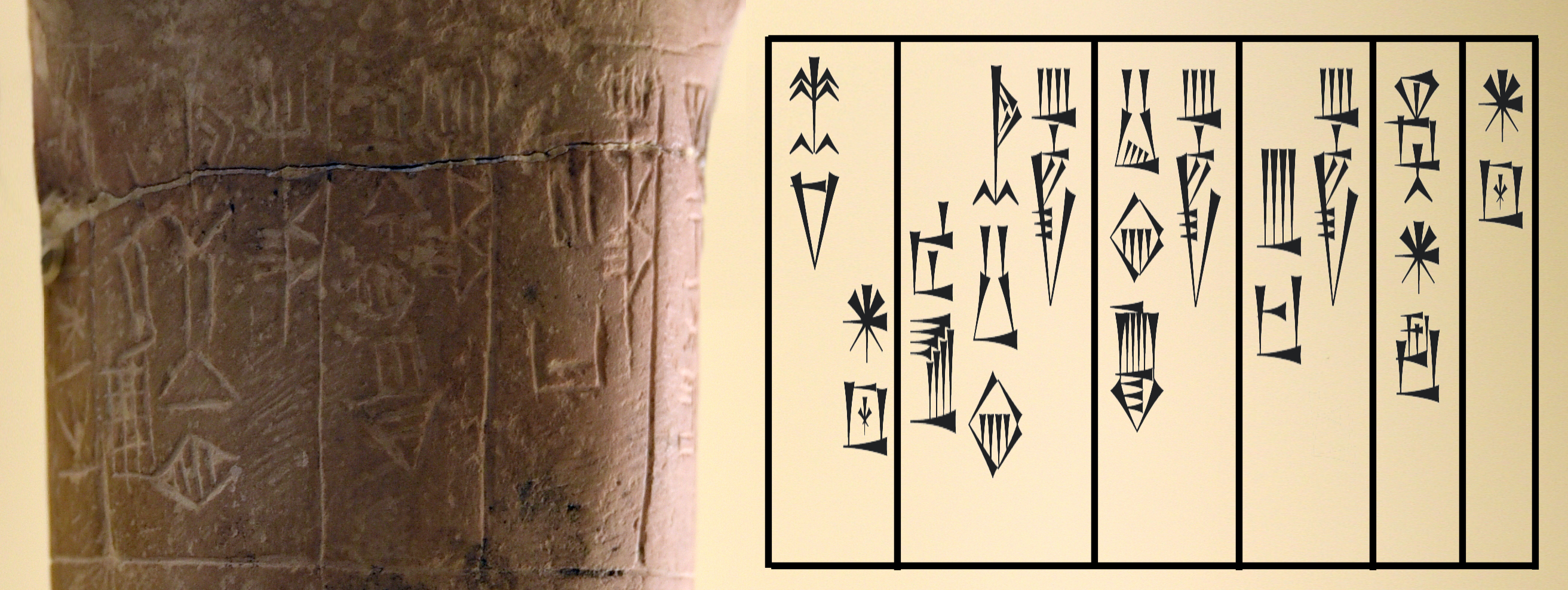
Lugal-kisalsi inscription

𒀭𒇉 / 𒁮𒀭𒊏 / 𒈗𒆦𒋛 / 𒈗𒀕𒆠𒂵 / 𒈗𒋀𒀊𒆠𒈠 / 𒂍𒀭𒇉 / 𒈬𒆕
{d}namma / dam an-ra / lugal-kisal-si / lugal unu{ki}-ga / lugal urim5{ki}-ma / e2 {d}namma / mu-du3

"For Namma, the wife of An, Lugalkisalsi, king of Uruk and king of Ur, the temple of Namma he built."

— Inscription of Lugal-kisalsi on his foundation peg.

A statue in the Louvre Museum is in the name of the grandson of Lugal-kisalsi, bearing the inscription: "Satam, son of Lu-Bara, son of Lugal-kisal-si, king of Uruk, attendant of Girim-sim, prince of Uruk."

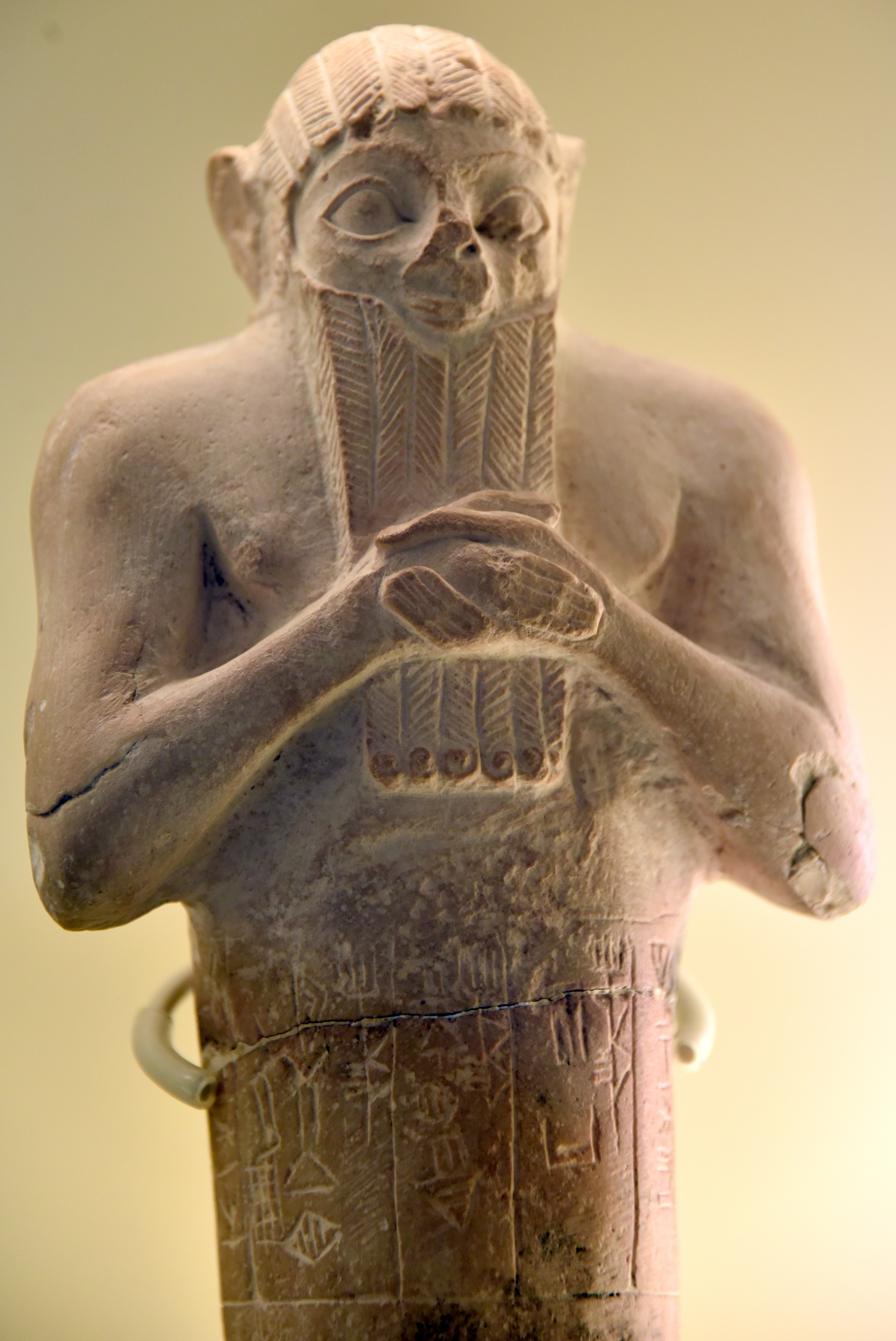
Lugal-kisalsi foundation peg (close-up). Inscription: "For (goddess) Namma, wife of (the god) An, Lugalkisalsi, King of Uruk, King of Ur, erected this temple of Namma".

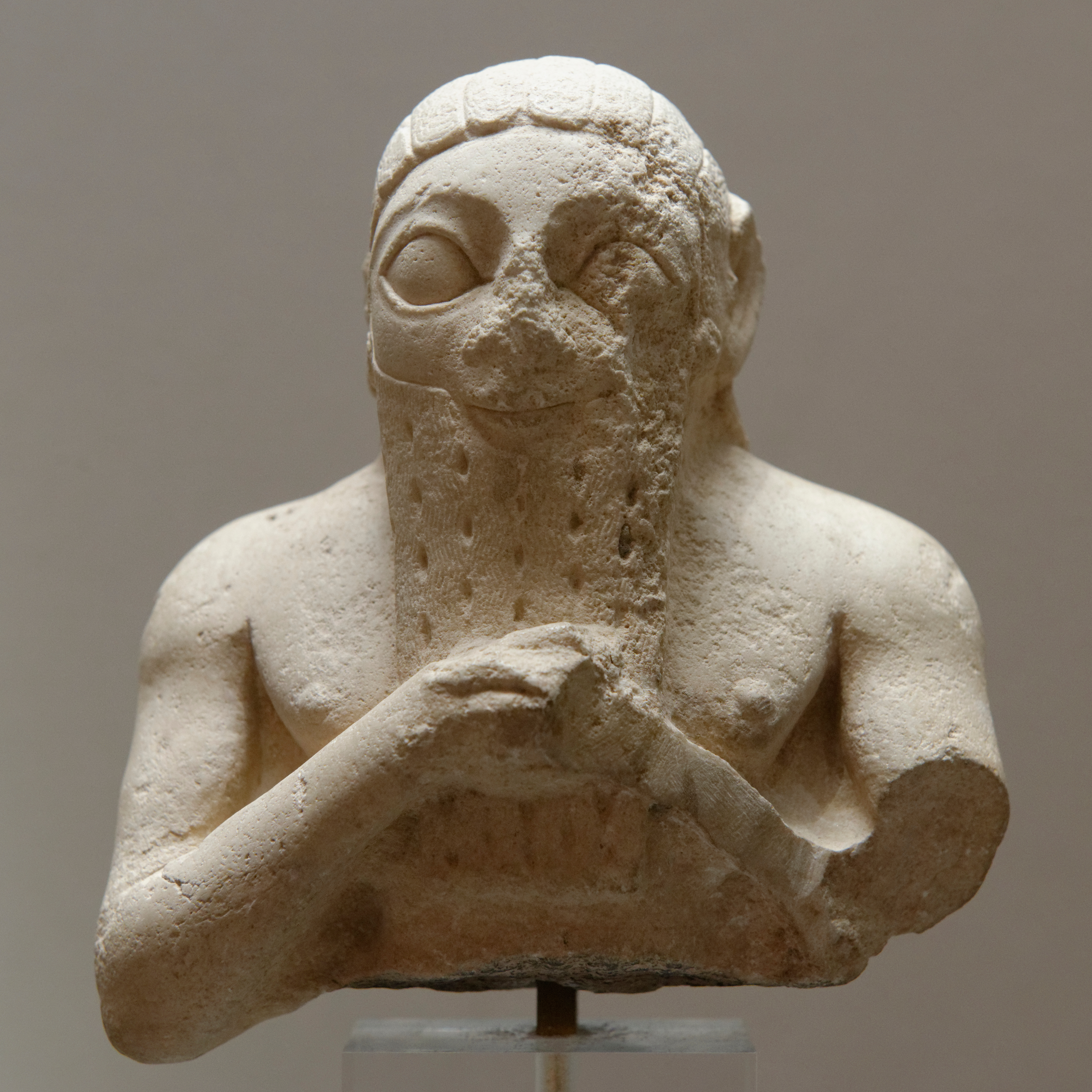
Male bust, perhaps Lugal-kisal-si, king of Uruk. Limestone, Early Dynastic III. From Adab (Bismaya).

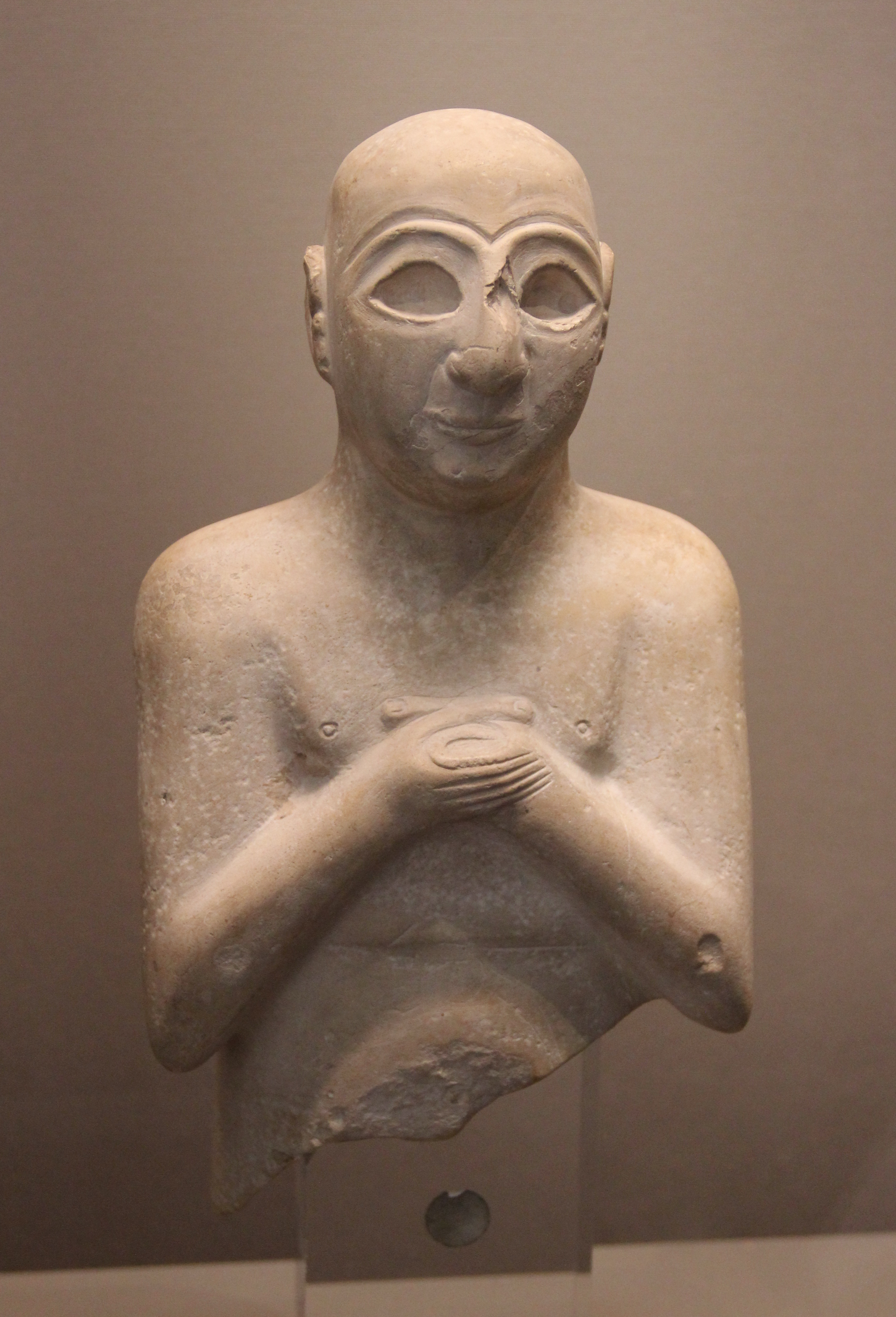
Statue of Satam, grandson of Lugal-kisal-si. Louvre Museum.

== See also ==
- History of Sumer
- Sumerian king list

Regnal titles
Preceded by Lugal-kinishe-dudu	King of Uruk c. 2400 BC	Succeeded by Possibly Urni
