= Anne St. Clair Wright =

American historic preservationist

Anne St. Clair Wright (1910–1993) was an American historic preservationist. A central figure in the foundation, in 1952, of Historic Annapolis Incorporated (currently Historic Annapolis Foundation), she served four terms as president and as chairman emeritus of the board. She was responsible for the preservation of the historic center of the city of Annapolis, Maryland. Her preservation work, advocacy and achievements inspired many preservation movements around the United States. She is considered a leading 20th-century American preservationist. Among many civic offices, she served as the director of the Society for the Preservation of Maryland Antiquities; chairman of the board of Preservation Action; was a member of the Mid-Atlantic Regional Advisory Committee of the U.S. National Park Service; director of the Southern Garden History Society; and a director of the Nature Conservancy.

== Preservation of Annapolis ==
Under her leadership, and using an innovative revolving fund approach, Historic Annapolis Inc. was able to restore more than 30 buildings of all types from the mansions of the elite to the homes and businesses of common citizens throughout the 18th-century core of the city of Annapolis as well as working to restore and preserve the historic street-scapes of the city. Rescued and restored buildings include the house of Charles Carroll the Barrister which was moved to the campus of St. John's College in 1955; the Shiplap house restored starting in 1957, Reynolds Tavern, 163 Duke of Gloucester Street, Pinkney Street, and the house of William Paca, a signer of the Declaration of Independence, whose house and garden stood on Prince George Street in Annapolis. The house was returned to its 18th-century state and the garden were restored using archeological evidence as well as Paca's contemporary writings. The Paca House and Garden are now open to the public. She was instrumental in saving the Annapolis Market House from demolition in 1969. In 1965, Stuart Udall, the US Secretary of the Interior, designated the downtown Annapolis a historic district as a Registered National Historic Landmark In 1982 she help initiate the 'Archaeology in Annapolis' program. The papers related to her work with Historic Annapolis are held in the University of Maryland Archives.

== Biography ==
Wright was born in 1910 in Newport News, Virginia, the daughter of U.S. naval officer Arthur St. Clair Smith and Anna Lena Salley. She lived in Annapolis, France, China, Panama, and Japan during her childhood. While living in Beijing as a girl, she attended the Peking American School as a member of the class of 1928. She was a graduate of Mary Baldwin College (Staunton, Virginia) and the Maryland Institute College of Art (Baltimore, Maryland), where she received her Bachelor of Arts degree in 1932. In 1932 she married Joseph Martin Pickett Wright, U.S. naval officer, in Panama. During the 1930s she worked as a muralist and ceramicist in Maryland and Washington D.C. Her family settled in Annapolis just prior to the Second World War. She raised three sons, two of whom became officers in the United States Navy, and one of whom is Henry Tutwiler Wright, a professor of anthropology. Throughout her life she was a passionate gardener. At the time of her death in 1993, she was still engaged in preservation action in Annapolis and the United States.

== Awards ==
- Maryland Woman's Hall of Fame, 2009
- James Marston Fitch Charitable Foundation's first grant award, 1990
- Honorary Degree of Doctor of Public Service from the University of Maryland, 1985
- The Phoenix Award from the Society of American Travel Writers, 1985
- Garden Club of America Historic Preservation Medal, 1983
- Citation from the Maryland House of Delegates for Outstanding Service in the Field of Preservation, 1979
- Honorary Degree of Doctor of Humane Letters from Towson State University, 1975
- Calvert Award from the Maryland Historical Trust, 1975
- Historic Preservation Award from the Federated Garden Clubs of America, 1970
- Louise duPont Crowninshield Award from the National Trust for Historic Preservation, 1968
- American Institute of Architects, Chesapeake Bay Chapter, Award for Distinguished Work in Historic Preservation, 1968
- Certificate of Distinguished Citizenship, Maryland, 1965.
