= Urzage =

Ancient Sumerian ruler

Urzage 𒌨𒍠𒌓𒁺

King of Uruk
- Reign: c. 2400 BC
- Predecessor: Possibly Lugalsilâsi I
- Successor: Possibly Lugal-kinishe-dudu
- Dynasty: Second dynasty of Uruk
- Religion: Sumerian religion

Urzage (Note: Sumerian: 𒌨𒍠𒌓𒁺, romanized: urzage; transliterated: ur.zag.e₃) (fl. c. 2400 BC) was a Sumerian ruler. He ruled sometime during the Early Dynastic IIIb period (c. 2500 – c. 2350 BCE); additionally, temp. A'annepada, Entemena, Il, and Ishtup-Ishar. Urzage was preceded by Lugalsilâsi I as the king of Uruk. Urzage may have also been succeeded by Lugal-kinishe-dudu as a great king of Kish.

== Sources ==
- Kesecker, N. T. (2018). "Lugalzagesi: The First Emperor of Mesopotamia?". ARAMAZD: Armenian Journal of Near Eastern Studies. 12 (1): 76–96. doi:10.32028/ajnes.v12i1.893.
- Marchesi, Gianni (2015). "Toward a Chronology of Early Dynastic Rulers in Mesopotamia". In Sallaberger, Walther; Schrakamp, Ingo (eds.). ARCANE:Associated Regional Chronologies for the Ancient Near East and the Eastern Mediterranean. Vol. III: History and Philology. Brepols. pp. 139–156. ISBN 978-2-503-53494-7.
