= Tell Khaiber =

Archaeological site in Iraq

- Location within Iraq Location within Near East
- 31°03′36″N 45°56′01″E
- Type: settlement
- Periods: Ubaid period, Early Dynastic period, Jemdet Nasr period, Kassites
- Location: Dhiq Qar Province, Iraq

Site notes
- Excavation dates: 2013-2017
- Archaeologists: Stuart Campbell

Tell Khaiber (تل خيبر) is a tell, or archaeological settlement mound, in southern Mesopotamia (modern-day Iraq). It is located thirteen kilometers west of the modern city of Nasiriyah, about 19 kilometers northwest of the ancient city of Ur in Dhiq Qar Province and 25 kilometers south of the ancient city of Larsa. In 2012, the site was visited by members of the Ur Region Archaeology Project (URAP), a cooperation between the British Institute for the Study of Iraq, the University of Manchester and the Iraqi State Board for Antiquities and Heritage. They found that the site had escaped looting, and applied for an excavation permit.

== History ==
Tell Khaiber is the first Sealand site excavated, and has been dated to circa 1500 BC. Very little is known about the Sealand Dynasty. Traditionally it was thought to exist roughly between 1700 and 1400 BC and to have replaced Babylon after its fall sometime around 1550 BC. Pottery shards from earlier periods including Late Uruk and Jemdet Nasr were widely found on the site but pre-second millennium remains are below the current water table.

== Archaeology ==
The site consists of two mounds designated as Tell Khaiber 1 and Tell Khaiber 2 (sometimes called Tell Gurra), both roughly 300 x 250 meters in area. Most of the Tell Khaiber 1 occupation is from the Sealand Dynasty period but pottery fragments from the Ubaid, Jemdet Nasr, and Early Dynastic periods were also found. Three baked bricks stamped with Ur III king Amar-Sin are thought to be imported from another site. Tell Khaiber 2 dates to the Kassite period. They lay on an ancient branch of the Euphrates River.

The two mounds were first identified in an area survey by Henry Wright in 1965, naming them Ishan Khaiber (site 60) and Tell Gurra (site 61). In the 1976 Iraqi Directorate of Antiquities atlas of archaeological sites both mounds were named Ishan Khaiber (sites 107 and 108). Between 2013 and 2017, the site was excavated by a team of Iraqi and British archaeologists. The excavations revealed the presence of a settlement dominated by a large administrative building dating to c. 1500 BC, or the Middle Bronze Age. The building, 53 meters by 83 meters (53m × 27.5m in its initial phase), referred to by the excavators as "the Fortified Building, covered 4400 square meters and was surrounded by 3.5 m thick walls, with large towers having meter-thick walls, pierced by a single gate. All the pottery recovered was of a utilitarian nature with proteomic analysis of one showing soy residue, the earliest attestation of soy in this region. Among the finds from this building was an archive of 145 clay tablets and fragments, after joins were made, in Level 2 of the southernmost corner. Eighty tablets, mostly lists and accounts, were found in room 300 with most of the rest, mostly letters were found in room 309. Four tablets were found under a later wall between the two rooms showing that a scribal tradition carried on for some time. Excavated tablets from the Sealand Dynasty are uncommon but a number of unprovenanced tablets in various institutions have been identified by Stephanie Dalley. The tablets were written in the Old Babylonian variant of Akkadian, though some Sumerian language school tablets were also found, and deal mostly with the administration of agricultural activities. Some of the tablets contained dates ("Year: Aya-dara-galama became king"), which indicated that the building was in use during the reign of Ayadaragalama, the eighth king of the Sealand Dynasty. Three private homes lying southeast of the public building were also investigated. A stratified sequence for 1st Sealand ceramics was also developed.

== Tell Abu Thahab ==
Also Tell Bint Al-Saeigh. The site lies about 23 kilometers south of the current course of the Euphrates river in the marshlands in the south of Iraq east of the ancient city of Ur in the Hammar Marshes. The similar site of Tell Lehem (Tell el-Leḥem) is located 30 kilometers to the west. It was occupied in the Old Babylonian period, First Sealand dynasty, and Kassite dynasty period. Uruk period pottery shards were also found on the surface. The site covers an area of about 30 hectares with two mounds divided by a drainage canal which damages archaeological remains. The main mound covers an area of about 320 square meters. It was excavated by a team from the Iraqi State Board of Antiquities and Heritage for three seasons from 2011 to 2013. The excavation reports for all three seasons were written but have not yet been published. Each season was led by Taha Karim, Hussein Flaih and Raed Hamed Abd Allah, and Mohammed Salih Attia respectively. Two large buildings were excavated at the top of the tell. A 59 meter by 35 meter Western Building constructed of limestone with a central courtyard and spiral columns was excavated. Several cuneiform tablets were found nearby. An Eastern Building was also excavated with niches, buttresses, and an altar, marking it as a temple. A large building of a domestic nature was also excavated. Twenty five graves of various periods, looted in antiquity, were found with the domestic building. An archive of cuneiform tablets from the Sealand period was found but has not yet been published. The site has been subject to looting.

== See also ==
- Cities of the ancient Near East
- Rejibah
- Tell Dehaila
- Tell Abu al-Dhahab
