= Naplanum =

Ruler of Larsa

Ruler of Larsa
- Reign: c. 2025-2004 BC
- Died: c. 2004 BC

Location of Larsa

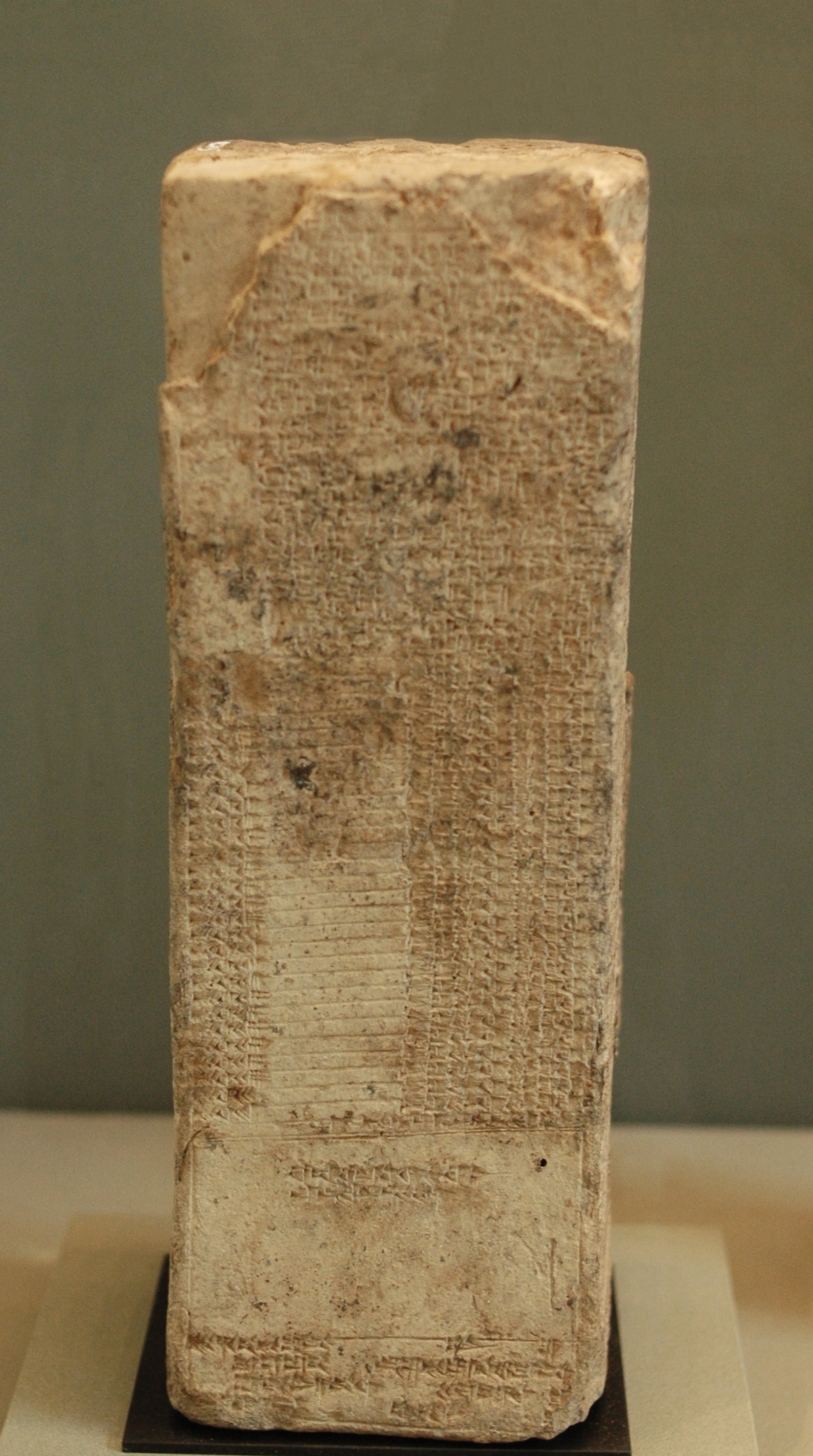
Naplanum appears in the 1st position in the list of the kings of Larsa, Louvre Museum

Naplanum was the first ruler of the ancient Near Eastern city-state of Larsa c. 2025-2004 BC (MC) — roughly during the reign of Ibbi-Sin of the Third dynasty of Ur and the great famine — according to the later Larsa King List (Larsa Date List). He is mentioned often in Ur III administrative texts of that time. It is known that at time he was residing at Kisig (thought to be Tell al-Lahm) near Ur. No contemporary year names or inscriptions have been found verifying that Naplanum was a king of Larsa, which seems to have remained part of Ibbi-Sin's kingdom. However a prominent and wealthy Amorite merchant named Naplanum does appear in many sales records of the grain industry during these later days of the Third Dynasty, who may well have been the ancestor of the later independent kings of Larsa. It has been suggested that Naplanum was actually only a high Amorite leader under Ur III and that later Larsa rulers elevated him to ruler to embellish their history. Naplanum is a contemporary of Ishbi-Erra of Isin.

== See also ==
- List of Mesopotamian dynasties
- Chronology of the ancient Near East
