= Pešgaldarameš =

Ruler of the First Sealand Dynasty

Pešgaldarameš was the eighth king (ca. 1534–1485 BCE) of the Sealand Dynasty, which ruled southern Mesopotamia for about 350 years from about 1783 to 1415 BCE. Pešgaldarameš is known from later Babylonian King Lists and chronicles, but also from some contemporary documents. He is one of the best-attested rulers of this dynasty and is said to have ruled for 50 years according to the king lists.

Pešgaldarameš is known primarily from the cuneiform texts that are now in the Schøyen Collection. The 474 texts probably come from a palace archive. However, their exact location is not known. They obviously come from a looted excavation. He is also known from two religious texts.

In Mesopotamia at this time, dates were based on years of rule; the years were not simply counted, but named after important events. Five such year names are known from the reign of Pešgaldarameš, which belong to the end of his reign. The last dates to his 29th year of rule, the subsequent dates belong to King Ayadaragalama. This suggests that Pešgaldarameš only ruled for 29 years, which is in contrast to the 50 years known from the later king lists.
