= Tell Dehaila =

Archaeological site in Iraq

- تل دحيلة (Arabic)
- Location within Iraq Location within Near East
- 30°58′00″N 45°47′20″E
- Type: archaeological site, tell, settlement site
- Periods: Isin-Larsa, Old-Babylonian, Neo-Babylonian
- Location: Dhi Qar Governorate, Iraq

History
- Built: 2nd millennium BC

Site notes
- Excavation dates: 2019, 2021, 2025
- Archaeologists: Alexei Jankowski-Diakonoff
- Condition: Ruined
- Owner: Public
- Public access: Yes

Tell Dehaila (Arabic: تل دحيلة) is an ancient tell, or archaeological site in Iraq. Remains at the site range from the Isin-Larsa/Old-Babylonian to Neo-Babylonian periods.

== Location ==
It is located in Dhi Qar Governorate, Iraq, about 30 kilometers west of the ancient city of Ur. The settlement is in the bend of an ancient branch of the Euphrates and about 25 kilometers upstream of the ancient city of Eridu.

The name of this waterway is mentioned only once in a 1st millennium BC lexical list as id_{2}.edin.eriduga(NUN)^{ki} = susuka, the former being the Sumerian hydronym and the latter the Akkadian one. Since the Sumerian was not spoken since a long time when the lexical list was created, this unusually descriptive hydronym ("a waterway of the Eridu Plain") is questionable.

== Archaeology ==
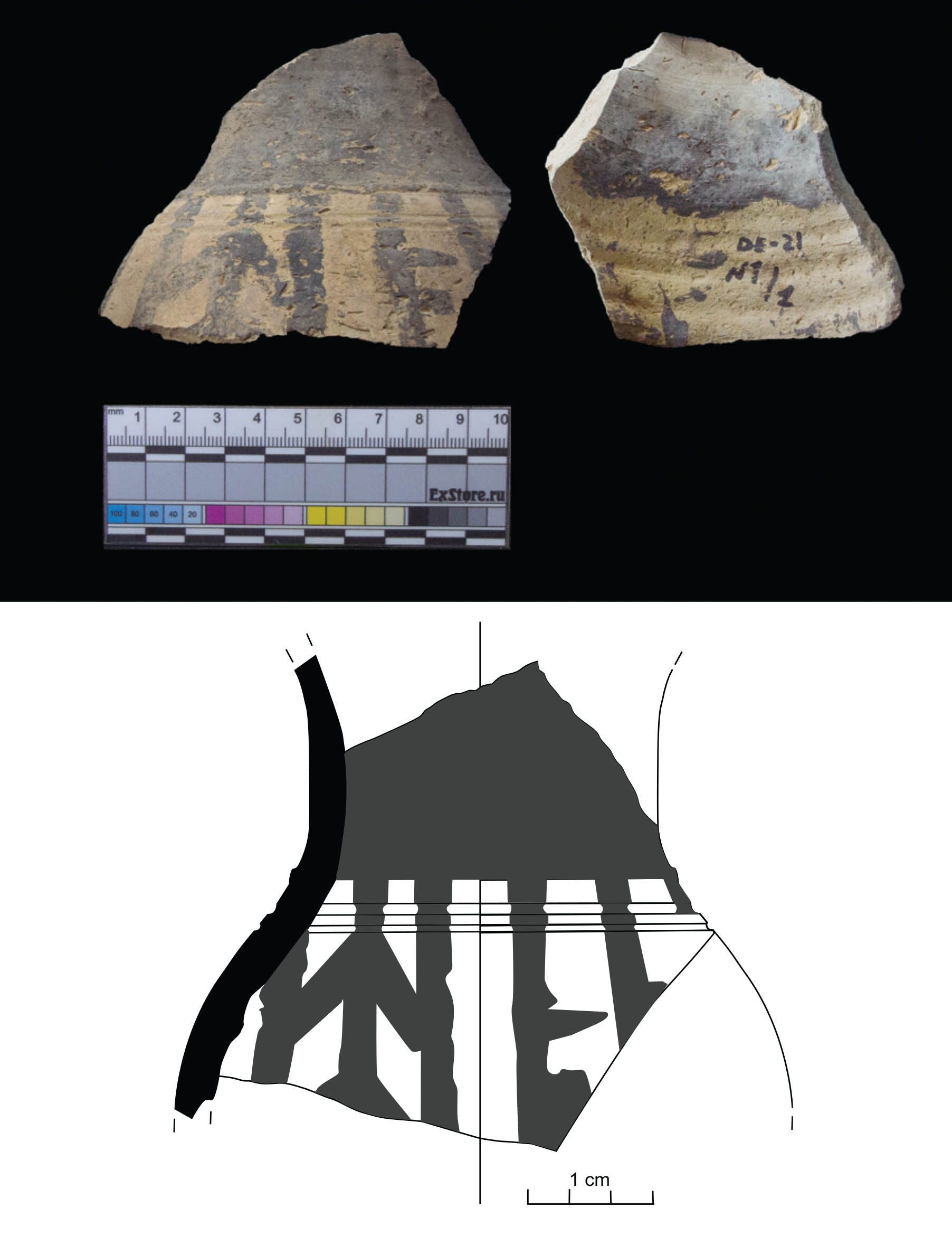
Old-Babylonian pottery fragment. Decorated with bitumen applied shortly after firing.

The site is EP-34 in the Wright's survey of the Eridu-Ur region. The survey found a site of about 85 hectares and late Isin-Larsa/Old-Babylonian pottery shards. The survey found "drains lined with baked brick in former streets, building foundations of both baked and mud brick, and localized concentrations of basalt, copper, ceramic slag".

Apparently, Henry Wright counted the total area of Tell Dehaila including the neighboring Dehaila-2 and Nun-5, which are now counted separately. The city wall is oval shaped and covers an area of 47 hectares. On the opposite side of the Eridu Canal there is a 5 hectare mound with a sizable (113 meter by 137 meter) building. A 130-meter barrage extended through the city wall into the waterway. As the waterway meandered to the east the site expanded into its former bed.

The site was surveyed by the Iraqi-Russian Multidisciplinary Project (IRMP) team in 2018, 2019 and 2023, and excavated in 2020, 2021 and 2025. In the second season two soundings of three were excavated to virgin soil. Evidence of monumental mudbrick construction was found including walls up to four meters wide. Neo-Babylonian pottery shards are found on surface.

In the 2023 season hi-res aerial orthoimagery provided highly detailed images of the city and 19 km^{2} of its surroundings, complemented by very clear geomagnetic mapping of a third of the urban area.

In the 2025 season more focused excavations started, based on the orthoimagery analysis. A cuneiform tablet fragment was found in situ. Thus it has been confirmed that the site was inhabited also in Neo-Babylonian era.

== History ==
The site was occupied in the first half of the 2nd millennium BC, during the Isin-Larsa and Old Babylonian periods, possibly until the early Sealand period. There was also some occupation in the mid-1st millennium BC, probably of a semi nomadic type. Abdulameer al-Hamdani suggested Tell Dehaila was the capital of the First Sealand dynasty. A known Sealand site, Tell Khaiber is 16 kilometers to the northeast.

== See also ==
- Cities of the ancient Near East
- Tell Khaiber
