= Henry T. Wright =

American archeologist and educator (born 1943)

- Born: 1943 (age 82–83); Annapolis, Maryland, U.S.
- Education: University of Michigan; University of Chicago
- Scientific career
- Workplaces: University of Chicago

Henry Tutwiler Wright (born 1943) is an American archeologist and educator. Wright has had significant contributions to the field of archaeology through his fieldwork, publications, and teaching. He serves as the Albert Clanton Spaulding Distinguished University Professor of Anthropology in the Department of Anthropology, and Curator of Near Eastern Archaeology in the Museum of Anthropology at the University of Michigan. He is also an External Professor at the Santa Fe Institute and a member of the Santa Fe Institute's Science Board.

== Biography ==
Henry T. Wright was born March 29, 1943, in Annapolis, Maryland. His mother was Anne St. Clair Wright, an Annapolis historical preservationist. He earned a B.A. degree from the University of Michigan (1964), and a Ph.D. degree in Near Eastern archaeology from University of Chicago (1967).

Wright has conducted fieldwork in Egypt, Iran, Iraq, Kenya, Madagascar, eastern North America and the American Midwest. From 1968 until 1978, he researched Mesopotamia in Iran.

== Awards ==
- 2009 – Gold Medal for Distinguished Archaeological Achievement, Archaeological Institute of America (AIA)
- 1994 – Elected Fellow, National Academy of Sciences
- 1993 – MacArthur Fellows Program

== Publications ==
- "Agent Based Modeling of Small-Scaled Societies", Dynamics in human and primate societies: agent-based modeling of social and spatial processes, Editors Timothy A. Kohler, George J. Gumerman, Oxford University Press US, 2000, ISBN 978-0-19-513168-0
- "James Bennett Griffin", Biographical Memoirs, Volume 90, National Academies Press, 2009, ISBN 978-0-309-12148-4
