= First Sealand dynasty =

Dynasty of southern Mesopotamia

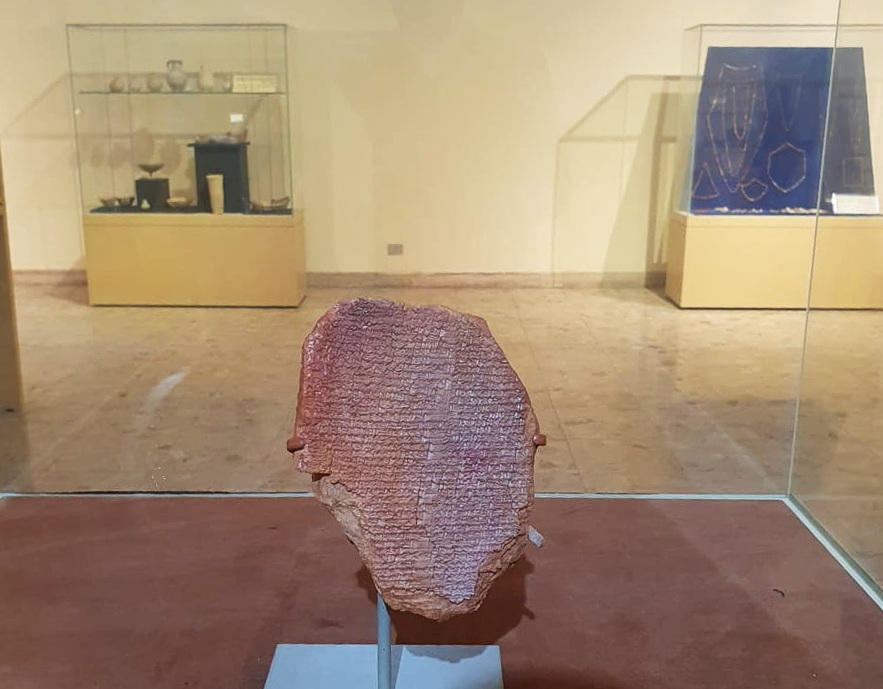
The Gilgamesh Dream tablet, Middle Babylonian Period, First Sealand Dynasty, Iraq Museum, Baghdad

The First Sealand dynasty (URU.KÙ^{KI} (Note: Where ŠEŠ-ḪA of King List A and ŠEŠ-KÙ-KI of King List B are read as URU.KÙ.KI)), or the 2nd Dynasty of Babylon (although it was independent of Amorite-ruled Babylon), very speculatively c. 1732–1475 BC (MC), is an enigmatic series of kings attested to primarily in laconic references in the King Lists A and B, and as contemporaries recorded on the Assyrian Synchronistic king list A.117. Initially it was named the "Dynasty of the Country of the Sea" with Sealand later becoming customary.

The dynasty, which had broken free of the Old Babylonian Empire, was named for the province in the far south of Mesopotamia, a swampy region bereft of large settlements which gradually expanded southwards with the silting up of the mouths of the Tigris and Euphrates rivers (the region known as mat Kaldi "Chaldaea" in the Iron Age). Sealand pottery has been found at Girsu, Uruk, and Lagash but in no site north of that.

The later kings bore pseudo-Sumerian names and harked back to the glory days of the Dynasty of Isin. The third king of the dynasty was possibly even named for the ultimate king of the dynasty of Isin, Damiq-ilišu, though it was written differently. Despite these cultural motifs, the population predominantly bore Akkadian names and wrote and spoke in the Akkadian language. In later times, a Sealand province of the Neo-Babylonian Empire also existed.

== History ==
Traditionally, all that was known about Sealand came from a few Kings List entries and the stray chronicle mention. It has been suggested that much of the writing in this period used waxed wooden boards, as a way of explaining the paucity of standard tablets found. Recently (2009) 450 published tablets mainly from the Martin Schøyen collection, the largest privately held collection of manuscripts to be assembled during the 20th century, cover a 15 to 18 year period extending over part of each king’s reign. They seem to originate from a single cache but their provenance was lost after languishing in smaller private collections since their acquisition on the antiquities market a century earlier. Most of the tablets pertain to administration of resources. An additional 32 unpublished Sealand tablets are held in Brussels. The tablets include letters, receipts, ledgers, personnel rosters, etc., and provide year-names and references which hint at events of the period. The tablets also included divinitory texts and literary compositions including an edition of the Epic of Gilgamesh. Messengers from Elam are provisioned, (Note: MS 2200/40 and MS 2200/455.) Inzak, a god of Dilmun (ancient Bahrain) appears as a theophoric element in names, (Note: MS 2200/394, 444, 321 and so on.) and Nūr-Bau asks whether he should detain the boats of Ešnunna, (Note: MS 2200/3.) a rare late reference to this once thriving Sumerian conurbation. In addition to normal commercial activity, two omen texts from another private collection are dated to the reign of Pešgaldarameš and a kurugu-hymn dedicated to the gods of Nippur mentions Ayadaragalama. The variant version of the Epic of Gilgameš relocates the hero to Ur and is a piece from this period. Some of the texts have "undeciphered linear inscriptions" thought to be in languages not Sumerian or Akkadian.

Excavations conducted between 2013 and 2017 at Tell Khaiber, around 20 km from Ur, have revealed the foundations of a large mudbrick fortress with an unusual arrangement of perimeter close-set towers. The site is dated, by an archive of 152 (after joins were made) clay cuneiform tablets found there, to the reign of Ayadaragalama. Tablets at Tell Khaiber fell into the same short time period as those published from the Schoyen Collection, that being the later part of Pešgal and early part of Ayadara reigns. Excavators were also able to develop a stratified ceramic array for Sealand allowing other sites to be identified. Sealand ceramics and faunal remains were found at the site of Tell Sakhariya, a few miles east of Ur. The location has been proposed as the Ur III period city of Ga’eš, site of the Akiti festival of Nanna/Sin, held twice a year. The temple of Nanna/Sin was called the Karzida and was located at Ga’eš. Tell Abu al-Dhahab, a single period site belonging to the Sealand dynasty was excavated from 2011 to 2013. A large 65 meter by 52 meter rectangular stone temple building with an attached 59 meter by 35 meter annex was uncovered. A cylinder seal was found with a proposed reading of "A-[x]-Bāni, offspring of Ṣillī-Ištar, Supervisor (of) the divination priests, Servant/slave to Shamash(?)." though the name of the deity is not certain.

The home city of the Sealand Dynasty is currently unknown. A kings list fragment states that Babylon's "kingship passed to E'urukuga". Given its site being known as uru.ku this capital has been speculated as being Lagash of which little is known in this period. Nippur, and Tell Deḥaila are also in consideration. Modern thinking is that the capital was a Dūr-Enlil (or Dūr-Enlile or Dūr-Enlilē). There was a Dūr-Enlil in Neo-Babylonian times in the general area between Uruk and Larsa as well as one in Neo-Assyrian times. It is not clear it either is the same place as the potential Sealand capital.

== The King list tradition ==
The king list references which bear witness to the sequence of Sealand kings are summarized below:

Position	King List A (Note: Babylonian King List A, BM 33332, i 4 to 14 where the names are abbreviated but give their lengths of reign.)	King List B (Note: Babylonian King List B, BM 38122, reverse 1 to 13.)	Purported reign	Contemporary
1	Ilima[ii]	Ilum-ma-ilī	60 years	Samsu-iluna and Abi-ešuh (Babylon) (Note: Chronicle of Early Kings, tablets BM 26472 and BM 96152, B rev. (Ilum-ma-ilī) 7-10 (Ea-gâmil) 12–14.)
2	Ittili	Itti-ili-nībī	56 years	
3	Damqili	Damqi-ilišu II	36 years	Adasi (Assyria) (Note: Synchronistic King List A.117, Assur 14616c, i 1 to 10.)
4	Iški	Iškibal	15 years	Belu-bāni (Assyria)
5	Šušši, brother	Šušši	24 years	Lubaia (Assyria)
6	Gulki...	Gulkišar	55 years	Sharma-Adad I (Assyria) Samsu-Ditana of Babylon
6a		^{m}DIŠ-U-EN	?	LIK.KUD-Šamaš (Assyria)
7	Peš-gal	Pešgaldarameš, (Note: Given as PEŠ.GAL-DÀRA.MAŠ.) his son, same	50 years	Bazaia (Assyria)
8	A-a-dàra	Ayadaragalama, (Note: Given as A-DÀRA-GALAM.MA.) his son, same	28 years	Lullaya (Assyria)
9	Ekurul	Akurduana	26 years	Shu-Ninua (Assyria)
10	Melamma	Melamkurkurra	7 years	Sharma-Adad II (Assyria)
11	Eaga	Ea-gam[il]	9 years	Erishum III (Assyria)

An additional king list (Note: Formed from BM 35572 and eleven other fragments.) provides fragmentary readings of the earlier dynastic monarchs. The king list A totals the reigns to give a length of 368 years for this dynasty. The Synchronistic King List A.117 gives the sequence from Damqi-ilišu onward, but includes an additional king between Gulkišar and Pešgaldarameš, ^{m}DIŠ-U-EN (reading unknown). This source is considered reliable in this respect because the forms of the names of Pešgaldarameš and Ayadaragalama match those on recently published contemporary economic tablets (see below).

== Rulers ==
The names of the first three rulers, attested or otherwise, are definitely Akkadian, the fourth, Iškibal, could be read either way and the rest all have solidly Sumerian names until the final ruler Ea-gâmil.

=== Ilum-ma-ilī ===
The name Ilum-ma-ili rendered in Akkadian (Babylonian) cuneiform

Ilum-ma-ilī, (Note: Tablet Ashm. 1922.353 from Larsa.) or Iliman (^{m}ili-ma-an), (also Ilī-ma-ilum) the founder of the dynasty, is known from the account of his exploits in the Chronicle of Early Kings which describes his conflicts with his Amorite Babylonian contemporaries Samsu-iluna and Abi-ešuḫ. It records that he “attacked and brought about the defeat of (Samsu-iluna’s) army.” He is thought to have conquered Nippur late in Samsu-iluna’s reign as there are legal documents from Nippur, from month 3 of Samsu-iluna year 29, dated to his reign. (Note: Five legal tablets such as CBS 4956, published in Chiera (1914), CBS 11013, published as BE VI 2 text 68, 3N-T 87, UM 55-21-239 catalogued as SAOC 44 text 12, and OIMA 1 45, from Nippur.) Abi-eshuh, the Amorite king of Babylon, and Samsu-iluna’s son and successor, “set out to conquer Ilum-ma-ilī,” by damming the Tigris, to flush him out of his swampy refuge, an endeavor which was apparently confounded by Ilum-ma-ilī’s superior use of the terrain. He is thought to have been mentioned in the Royal Archive of King Ilūni as having diplomatic contacts with Elam. Two year names of this ruler are known, his accession year (mu ì-lí-ma-dingir lugal.e) and the year following. A much later chronicle (Royal List B) has him followed by Itti-ili-nībī (My name is with the god), otherwise unattested.

=== Damqi-ilišu ===
The last surviving year-name for Ammi-ditana commemorates the “year in which (he) destroyed the city wall of Der/Udinim built by the army of Damqi-ilišu. (Note: Tablets MCS 2 52, YOS 13 359.) In the original "MU am-mi-di-ta-na LUGAL.E BÀD.DA UDINIMki.MA (ÉREN) dam-qí-ì-lí-šu.KE4 BÍ.IN.DÙ.A BÍ.IN.GUL.LA". This is the only current contemporary indication of the spelling of his name, contrasting with that of the earlier king of Isin. It has been suggested that a royal hymn usually ascribed to that Isin ruler, Damiq-ilishu, is actually that of Damqi-ilišu. Later chronicles have him followed by Iškibal and Šušši, otherwise unattested.

A letter from Babylonian fortress at Dūr-Abī-ešuḫ, dated to the reign of Ammi-ditana, mentions "the intelligence concerning Damqi-ilišu which you sent to my lord".

=== Gulkišar ===
Gulkišar, meaning “raider of the earth,” has left few traces of his apparently lengthy reign. He was the subject of a royal epic (Tablet HS 1885+ plus 2 recent fragment joins) concerning his enmity with Samsu-ditāna, the last king of the first dynasty of Babylon. The text describes Gulkišar addressing his troops and being accompanied by the god Istar. The colophon of a tablet giving a chemical recipe for glaze (Note: Tablet BM 120960 thought to have been recovered from Tall 'Umar (Seleucia) on the Tigris.) reads “property of a priest of Marduk in Eridu,” thought to be a quarter of Babylon rather than the city of Eridu, is dated mu.us-sa Gul-ki-šar lugal-e "year after (the one when) Gul-kisar (became?) king.” A kudurru (Note: Kudurru in the University Museum, Philadelphia, BE I/1 83 15.) of the period of Babylonian king Enlil-nādin-apli, c. 1103–1100 BC, records the outcome of an inquiry instigated by the king into the ownership of a plot of land claimed by a temple estate. The governors of Bit-Sin-magir and Sealand, upheld the claim based on the earlier actions of Gulkišar who had “drawn for Nanse, his divine mistress, a land boundary.” It is an early example of a Distanzangaben statement recording that 696 years had elapsed between Nabû-kudurrī-uṣur, Enlil-nādin-apli’s father, and Gulkišar.

=== Pešgaldarameš and Ayadaragalama ===
Pešgaldarameš, “son of the ibex,” and Ayadaragalama, “son of the clever stag,” were successive kings and descendants (DUMU, "sons" in its broadest meaning) of Gulkišar. Four year names of this ruler are known, his acession year, year 24, year 27, and year 29 (mu peš.gal-dàra.meš ki 29 lugal.e). In that period some rulers were beginning to use number based year names.

Ayadaragalama’s reign seems to have been eventful, as a year-name records expelling the “massed might of two enemies,” speculated to be Elamites and Kassites, the Kassites having previously deposed the Amorites as rulers in Babylon. Another records the building of a “great ring against the Kalšu (Kassite) enemy” and a third records the “year when his land rebelled.” A year-name gives “year when Ayadaragalama was king – after Enlil established (for him?) the shepherding of the whole earth,” and a list of gods (text MS 2200/81) includes Marduk and Sarpanitum, the tutelary deities of the Sealand. Ayadaragalama is known to have made offerings to deities at a number of temples in Mesopotamina:

"Babylon (Marduk and Ṣarpanitu), Kish (Zababa), Sippar (Shamash and Aya), Agade (Bēlet Agade), Uruk (Bēlet-Eanna, āšibti Uruk), Zabalam (Nin-su.gal), Larsa (Inanna of Larsa with Nanay), Ur (Shamash of Ur), Eridu or Ku'ara (Damgalnuna and Asarluhi) and Nina"

Ayadaragalama is known to have interacted with other regional powers. A text reports him receiving an Elamite messenger, assumed to be from a Sukkalmah ruler, and the same day receiving a messenger from an unknown Kassite lord, Buragindar. Two ewes were delivered to the palace for the Elamite and only one lamb for the Kassite showing their relative importance at that time. A number of year names are known for this ruler though their order is uncertain. Later chronicles have him followed by Akurduana and Melamkurkurra (Splendor of the land(s)), otherwise unattested.

During a 1942 cleaning in preparation for publication of excavations from Tell en-Nasbeh a semi-circular bronze circlet was found to contain a fragmentary cuneiform inscription. Though the transliteration was not certain a proposed translation was "... ]-yada', his very own son, for the well-being of his life dedi[cated ...". It has been suggested that this referred to Ayadaragalama.

=== Ea-gâmil ===
Ea-gâmil (Ea spares), the ultimate king of the dynasty, fled to Elam ahead of an army led by Kassite chief Ulam-Buriaš, brother of the king of Babylon Kashtiliash III, who conquered the Sealand, incorporated it into Babylonia and “made himself master of the land.” Agum III, successor to Ulam-Buriaš, is also described as attacking Sealand and destroying a temple in "Dūr-Enlil". A single year name, from year 4, is known for this ruler. Textual evidence at the Dilmun site Qal'at al-Bahrain mentions Ea-gâmil.

A serpentine or diorite mace head or possibly door knob found in Babylon, is engraved with the epithet of Ulaburariaš, “King of Sealand”. The object was excavated at Tell Amran ibn-Ali, during the German excavations of Babylon, conducted from 1899 to 1912, and is now housed in the Pergamon Museum.

== See also ==
- Chronology of the ancient Near East
- List of Mesopotamian dynasties
- Pašime
- Tell Khaiber
- Tell Dehaila
