= Uruk =

Ancient city of Sumer and Babylonia

- 𒀕𒆠, Unugᵏⁱ (Sumerian) 𒌷𒀕 or 𒌷𒀔, Uruk (Akkadian)
- Location within Iraq
- 31°19′27″N 45°38′14″E
- Type: Settlement
- Periods: Uruk period to Early Middle Ages
- Location: Muthanna Governorate, Iraq
- Region: Mesopotamia

History
- Built: c. 5000 BC
- Abandoned: c. 700 AD

Site notes
- Area: 6 km^{2} (2.3 sq mi)
- Excavation dates: 1850, 1854, 1902, 1912–1913, 1928–1939, 1953–1978, 2001–2002, 2016–present
- Archaeologists: William Loftus, Walter Andrae, Julius Jordan, Heinrich Lenzen, Margarete van Ess

UNESCO World Heritage Site
- Official name: Uruk Archaeological City
- Part of: Ahwar of Southern Iraq
- Criteria: Mixed: (iii)(v)(ix)(x)
- Reference: 1481-005
- Inscription: 2016 (40th Session)
- Area: 541 ha (2.09 sq mi)
- Buffer zone: 292 ha (1.13 sq mi)

Uruk, the archeological site known today as Warka, was an ancient city in the Near East or West Asia, located east of the current bed of the Euphrates River, on an ancient, now-dried channel of the river in Muthanna Governorate, Iraq. The site lies 93 kilometers (58 miles) northwest of ancient Ur, 108 kilometers (67 miles) southeast of ancient Nippur, and 24 kilometers (15 miles) northwest of ancient Larsa.

Uruk is the type site for the Uruk period and played a leading role in the early urbanization of Sumer in the mid-4th millennium BC. At its peak around 3100 BC, the city may have had up to 50,000 residents, with 80,000–90,000 people living in its environs, making it the largest urban area in the world at the time. Gilgamesh, according to the chronology presented in the Sumerian King List (SKL), ruled Uruk in the 27th century BC. After the end of the Early Dynastic period, with the rise of the Akkadian Empire, the city lost its prime importance. It had periods of flourishing during the Isin-Larsa period, Neo-Assyrian and Neo-Babylonian periods and throughout the Achaemenid (550–330 BC), Seleucid (312–63 BC) and Parthian (227 BC to AD 224) periods, until it was finally abandoned shortly before or after the Islamic conquest of 633–638. William Kennett Loftus visited the site of Uruk in 1849, identifying it as "Erech", known as "the second city of Nimrod", and led the first excavations from 1850 to 1854.

== Toponymy ==
Uruk (/ˈʊrʊk/) has several spellings in cuneiform. In Sumerian, it is 𒀕𒆠 unugᵏⁱ, and in Akkadian, it is spelled 𒌷𒀕 or 𒌷𒀔 Uruk (^{URU}UNUG). In Arabic, it is called وركاء (Warkāʾ) or أوروك (Auruk); in Syriac, ܐܘܿܪܘܿܟ (ʾÚrūk); and in Biblical Hebrew, אֶרֶךְ (ʾÉreḵ). In Ancient Greek, it was known as Ὀρχόη (Orkhóē), Ὀρέχ (Orékh), and Ὠρύγεια (Ōrúgeia).

Many linguists also state that the name Iraq derived from Uruk.

== History ==
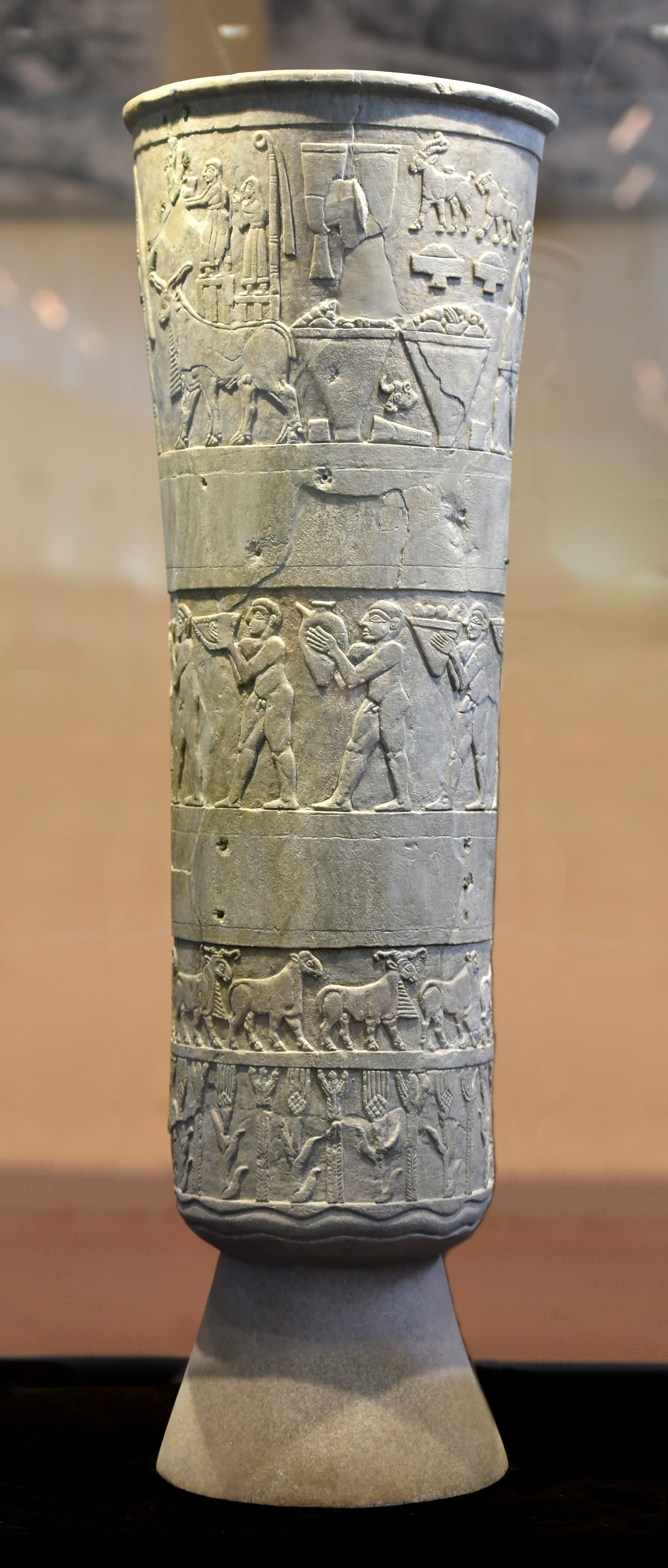
Devotional scene to Inanna, Warka Vase, c. 3200–3000 BC, Uruk. This is one of the earliest surviving works of narrative relief sculpture.

According to the SKL, Uruk was founded by the king Enmerkar. Though the king-list mentions a father before him, the epic Enmerkar and the Lord of Aratta relates that Enmerkar constructed the House of Heaven (Sumerian: e₂-anna; cuneiform: 𒂍𒀭 E₂.AN) for the goddess Inanna in the Eanna District of Uruk. In the Epic of Gilgamesh, Gilgamesh builds the city wall around Uruk and is king of the city.

Uruk went through several phases of growth, from the Early Uruk period (4000–3500 BC) to the Late Uruk period (3500–3100 BC). The city was formed when two smaller Ubaid settlements developed into the cities of Unug and Kullaba and later merged to become Uruk. The temple complexes at their cores became the Eanna District (Unug) dedicated to Inanna and the "Anu" District of Kullaba.

The Eanna District comprised several buildings with workshop spaces and was walled off from the city. By contrast, the Anu District was built on a terrace with a temple at the top. It is clear Eanna was dedicated to Inanna from the earliest Uruk period throughout the history of the city. The rest of the city was composed of typical courtyard houses, grouped by profession of the occupants, in districts around Eanna and Anu. Uruk was extremely well penetrated by a canal system that has been described as "Venice in the desert". This canal system flowed throughout the city connecting it with the maritime trade on the ancient Euphrates River as well as the surrounding agricultural belt.

The original city of Uruk was situated southwest of the ancient Euphrates River. Today, the site of Warka is northeast of the river. The change in position was caused by a shift in the Euphrates at some point in history, which, together with salinization from irrigation, may have contributed to the decline of Uruk.

=== Uruk period ===
Uruk expansion and colonial outposts, c. 3600–3200 BC

In addition to being one of the first cities, Uruk was the main force of urbanization and state formation during the Uruk period, or 'Uruk expansion' (4000–3200 BC). This period of 800 years saw a shift from small, agricultural villages to a larger urban center with a full-time bureaucracy, military, and stratified society. Although other settlements coexisted with Uruk, they were generally about 10 hectares while Uruk was significantly larger and more complex. The Uruk period culture exported by Sumerian traders and colonists influenced all surrounding peoples, who gradually evolved their own comparable, competing economies and cultures. Ultimately, Uruk could not maintain long-distance control over colonies such as Tell Brak by military force.

=== Early Dynastic, Akkadian, Ur III, and Old Babylonian period ===
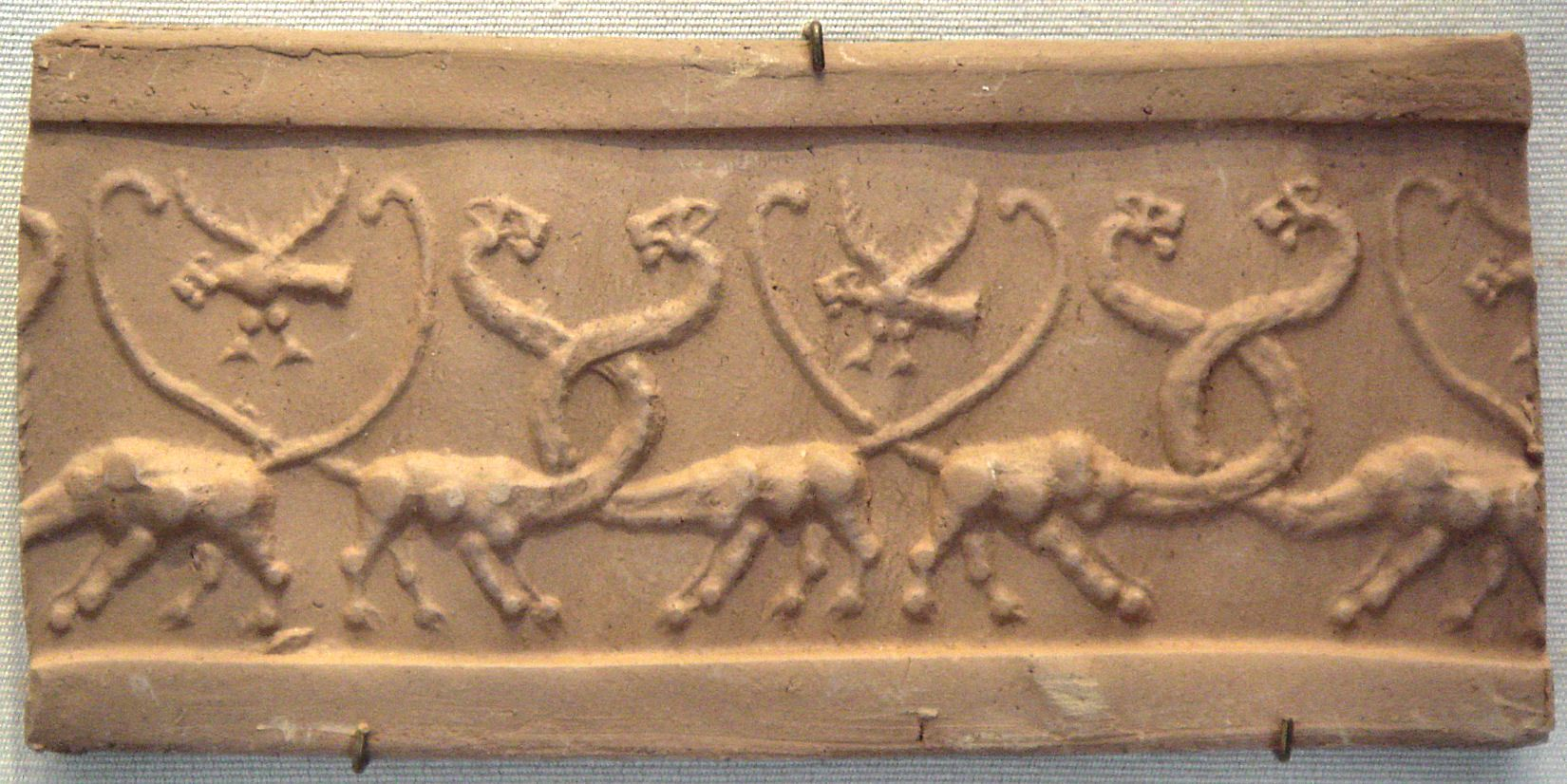
Clay impression of a cylinder seal with monstrous lions and lion-headed eagles, Mesopotamia, Uruk Period (4100–3000 BC). Louvre Museum.

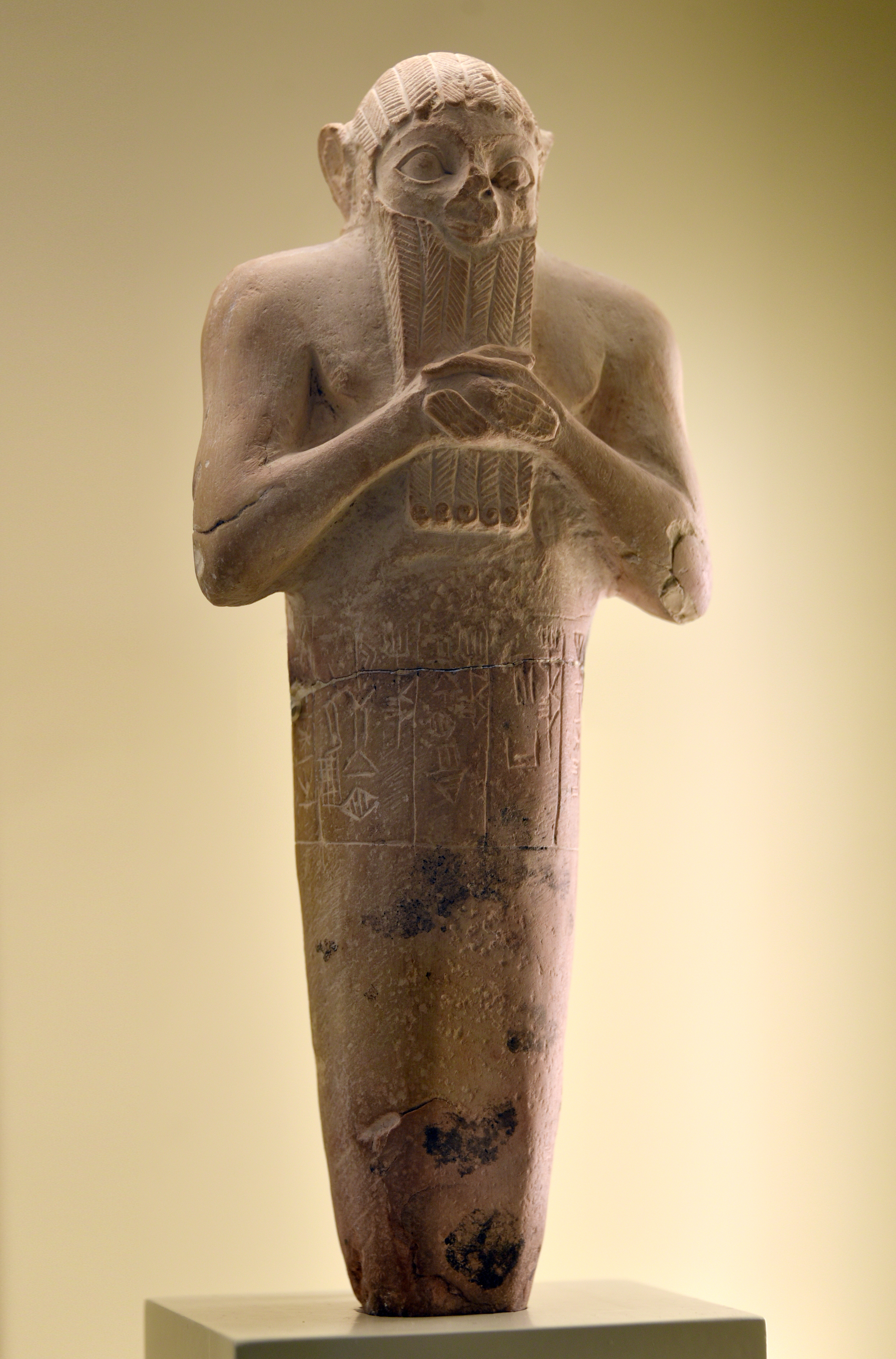
Foundation peg of Lugal-kisalsi, king of Uruk, Ur and Kish, circa 2380 BC. The inscription reads "For (the goddess) Namma, wife of (the god) An, Lugalkisalsi, King of Uruk, King of Ur, erected this temple of Namma". Pergamon Museum VA 4855.

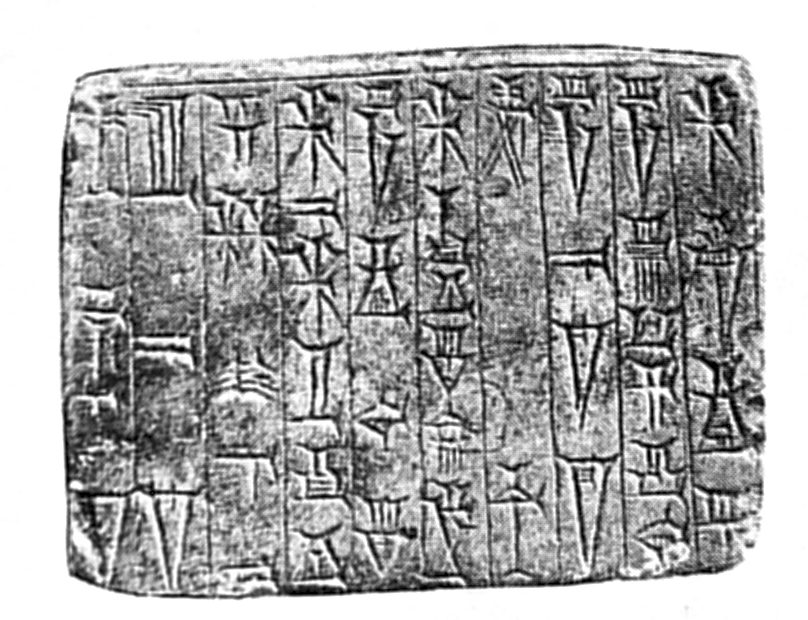
Dedication tablet of Sîn-gāmil, ruler of Uruk, 18th century BC

Dynastic categorizations are described solely from the Sumerian King List, which is of problematic historical accuracy; the organization might be analogous to Manetho's.

In 2009, two different copies of an inscription were put forth as evidence of a 19th-century BC ruler of Uruk named Naram-sin.

Uruk continued as a principality of Ur, Babylon, and later Achaemenid, Seleucid, and Parthian Empires. It enjoyed brief periods of independence during the Isin-Larsa period, under kings such as (possibly Ikūn-pî-Ištar, Sumu-binasa, Alila-hadum, and Naram-Sin), Sîn-kāšid, his son Sîn-irībam, his son Sîn-gāmil, Ilum-gāmil, brother of Sîn-gāmil, Etēia, AN-am_{3} (Dingiram), ÌR_{3}-ne-ne (Irdanene), who was defeated by Rīm-Sîn I of Larsa in his year 14 (c. 1740 BC), Rîm-Anum and Nabi-ilīšu.

It is known that during the time of Ilum-gāmil a temple was built for the god Iškur (Hadad) based on a clay cone inscription reading "For the god Iškur, lord, fearsome splendour of heaven and earth, his lord, for the life of Ilum-gāmil, king of Uruk, son of Sîn-irībam, Ubar-Adad, his servant, son of Apil-Kubi, built the Esaggianidu, ('House — whose closing is good'), the residence of his office of en, and thereby made it truly befitting his own li[fe]".

=== Uruk into Late Antiquity ===
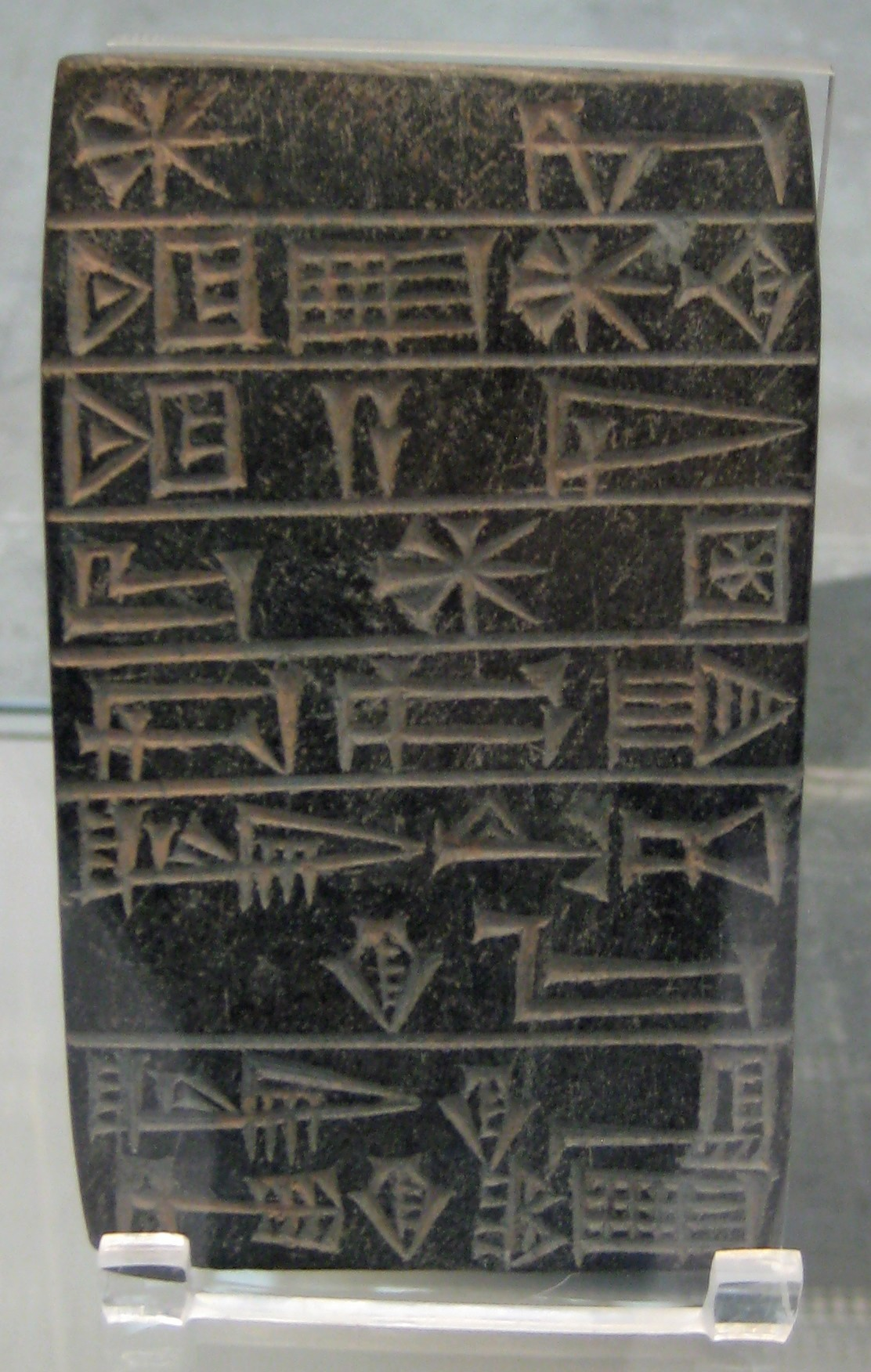
Foundation tablet from the Temple of Inanna at Uruk (Eanna), dating to the reign of Ur-Nammu

Although it had been a thriving city in Early Dynastic Sumer, especially Early Dynastic II, Uruk was ultimately annexed by the Akkadian Empire and went into decline. Later, in the Neo-Sumerian period, Uruk enjoyed a revival as a major economic and cultural center under the sovereignty of Ur. The Eanna District was restored as part of an ambitious building program, which included a new temple for Inanna. This temple included a ziggurat, the 'House of the Universe' (Cuneiform: E₂.SAR.A) (𒂍𒊬𒀀) to the northeast of the Uruk period Eanna ruins.

Following the collapse of Ur (c. 2000 BC), Uruk went into a steep decline until about 850 BC when the Neo-Assyrian Empire annexed it as a provincial capital. Under the Neo-Assyrians and Neo-Babylonians, Uruk regained much of its former glory. By 250 BC, a new temple complex, the 'Head Temple' (Akkadian: Bīt Reš), was added northeast of the Uruk-period Anu district. The Bīt Reš along with the Esagila was one of the two main centers of Neo-Babylonian astronomy. All of the temples and canals were restored again under Nabopolassar. During this era, Uruk was divided into five main districts: the Adad Temple, Royal Orchard, Ištar Gate, Lugalirra Temple, and Šamaš Gate districts.

Uruk, known as Orcha (Ὄρχα) to the Greeks, continued to thrive under the Seleucid Empire. During this period, Uruk was a city of 300 hectares and perhaps 40,000 inhabitants. In 200 BC, the 'Great Sanctuary' (Cuneiform: E₂.IRI₁₂.GAL, Sumerian: eš-gal) of Ishtar was added between the Anu and Eanna districts. The ziggurat of the temple of Anu, which was rebuilt in this period, was the largest ever built in Mesopotamia. When the Seleucids lost Mesopotamia to the Parthians in 141 BC, Uruk continued in use. The decline of Uruk after the Parthians may have been in part caused by a shift in the Euphrates River. By 300 AD, Uruk was mostly abandoned, but a group of Mandaeans settled there, based on some finds of Mandaic incantation bowls, and by c. 700 AD it was completely abandoned.

=== Political history ===
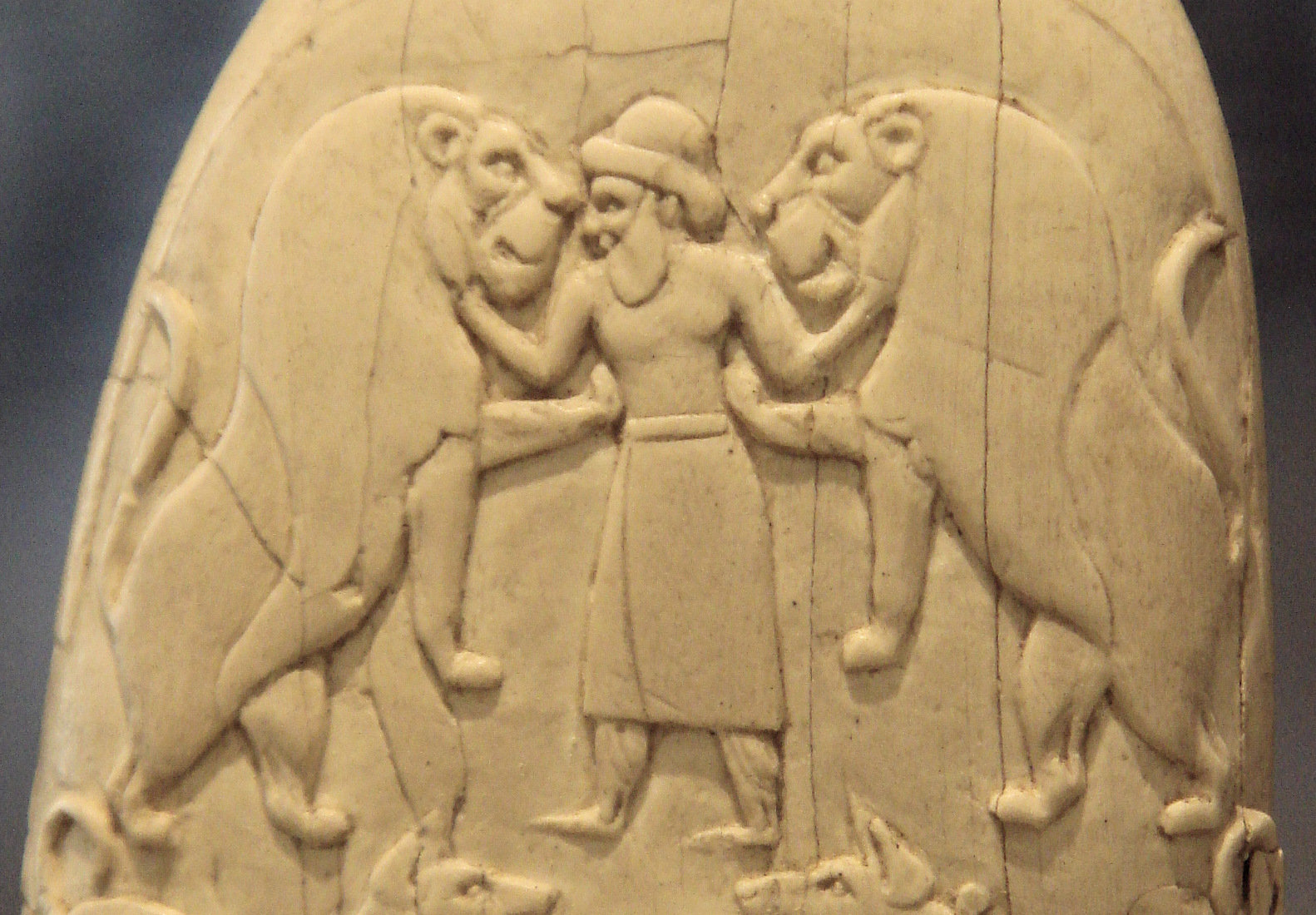
Mesopotamian king as Master of Animals on the Gebel el-Arak Knife (c. 3300–3200 BC, Abydos, Egypt), a work indicating Egypt-Mesopotamia relations and showing the early influence of Mesopotamia on Egypt and the state of Mesopotamian royal iconography in the Uruk period. Louvre.

Uruk played a very important part in the political history of Sumer. From the Early Uruk period onward, the city exerted hegemony over nearby settlements. At this time (c. 3800 BC), there were two centers of 20 ha (49 acres), Uruk in the south and Nippur in the north surrounded by much smaller 10 ha (25 acres) settlements. Later, in the Late Uruk period, its sphere of influence extended over all Sumer and beyond to external colonies in upper Mesopotamia and Syria.

In Uruk, in southern Mesopotamia, Sumerian civilization seems to have reached its creative peak. This is pointed out repeatedly in the references to this city in religious and, especially, in literary texts, including those of mythological content; the historical tradition as preserved in the Sumerian king-list confirms it. From Uruk the center of political gravity seems to have moved to Ur.

— Oppenheim

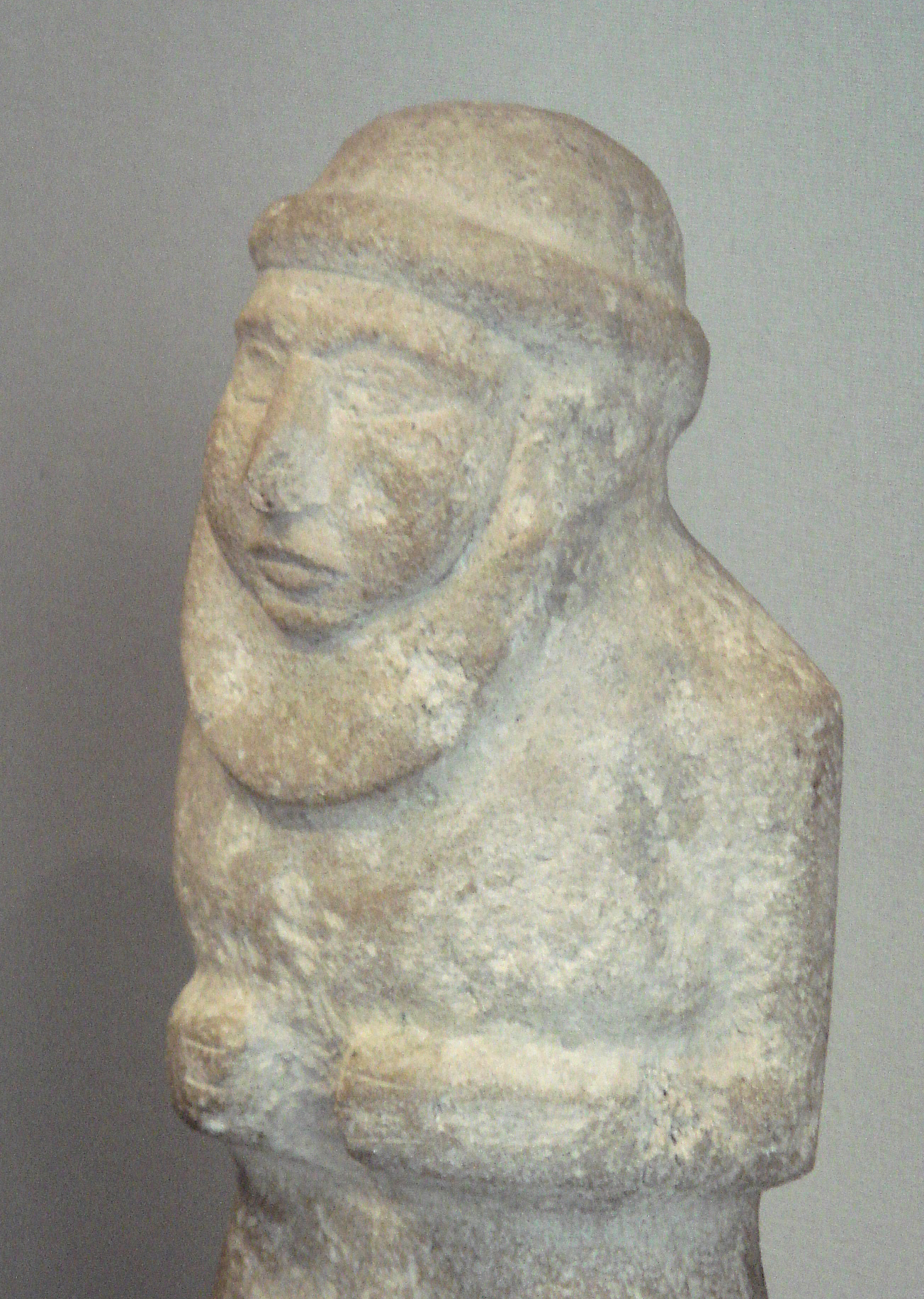
Probable Uruk King-Priest with a beard and hat (c. 3300 BC, Uruk). Louvre.

The recorded chronology of rulers of Uruk includes both mythological and historical figures across five dynasties. As in the rest of Sumer, power moved progressively from the temple to the palace. Rulers from the Early Dynastic period exercised control over Uruk and, at times, over all of Sumer. In myth, kingship was brought down from heaven to Eridu, then passed through five cities in succession until the deluge, which ended the Uruk period. Afterwards, kingship passed to Kish at the beginning of the Early Dynastic period, which corresponds to the beginning of the Early Bronze Age in Sumer. In the Early Dynastic I period (2900–2800 BC), Uruk was in theory under the control of Kish. This period is sometimes called the Golden Age. During the Early Dynastic II period (2800–2600 BC), Uruk was again the dominant city exercising control of Sumer. This period corresponds to the First Dynasty of Uruk, also known as the Heroic Age. However, by the Early Dynastic IIIa period (2600–2500 BC) Uruk had lost sovereignty, this time to Ur. This period, corresponding to the Early Bronze Age III, is the end of the First Dynasty of Uruk. In the Early Dynastic IIIb period (2500–2334 BC), also called the Pre-Sargonic period (before the rise of the Akkadian Empire under Sargon of Akkad), Uruk remained under Ur's rule.

== Architecture ==
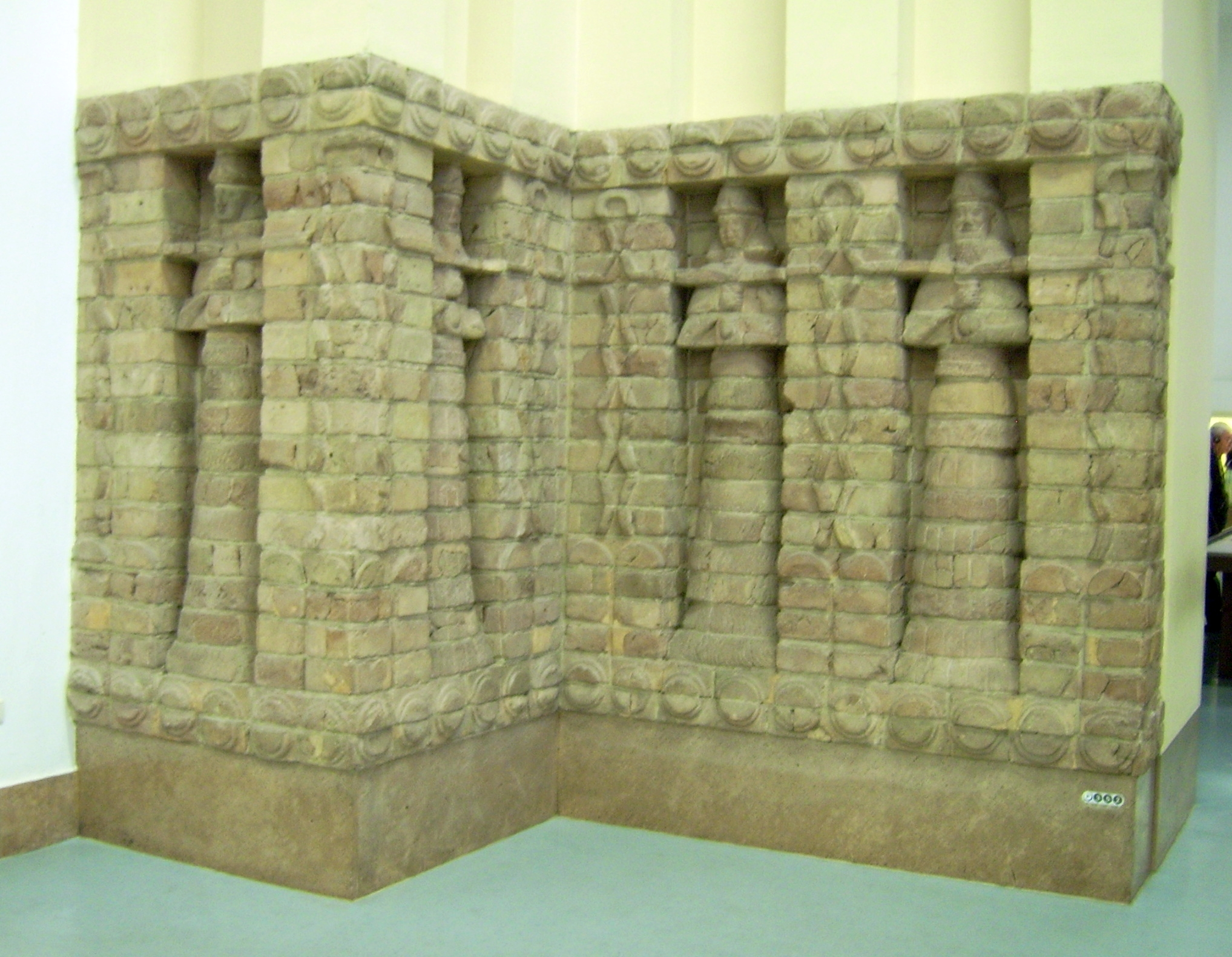
Relief on the front of the Inanna temple of Karaindash from Uruk. Mid 15th century BC. Pergamon Museum, Berlin.

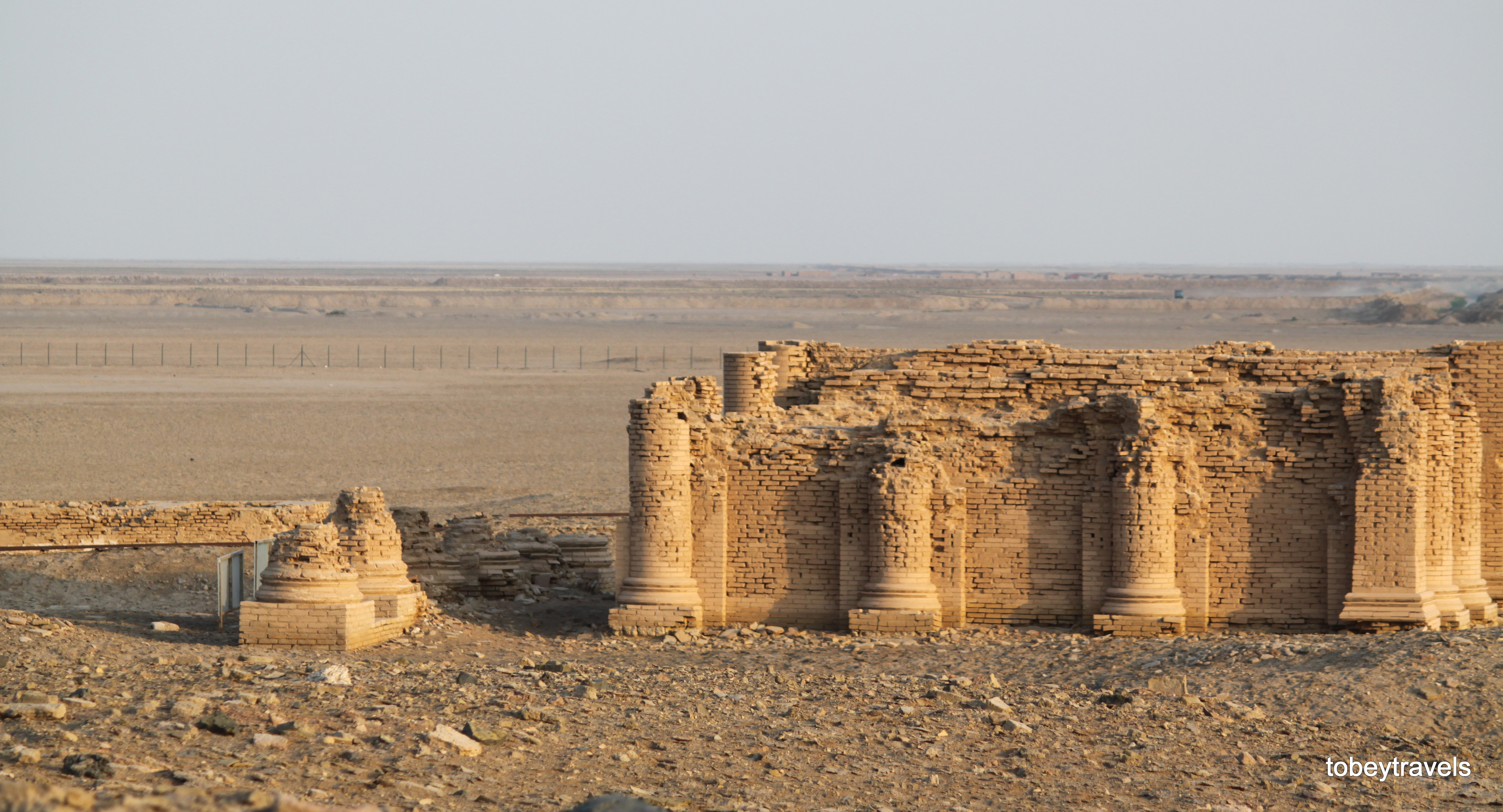
The Parthian Temple of Charyios at Uruk

Uruk has some of the first monumental constructions in architectural history, and certainly the largest of its era. Much of Near Eastern architecture can trace its roots to these prototypical buildings. The structures of Uruk are cited under two different naming conventions: one in German from the initial expedition and the English translation of the same. The site's stratigraphy is complex, and as a result, much of the dating is disputed. In general, the structures follow the two main typologies of Sumerian architecture: Tripartite, with three parallel halls, and T-Shaped, with three halls, with the central hall extending into two perpendicular bays at one end. The following table summarizes the significant architecture of the Eanna and Anu Districts. Temple N, the Cone-Mosaic Courtyard, and the Round Pillar Hall are often referred to as a single structure: the Cone-Mosaic Temple.

Eanna district: 4000–3000 BC
Structure name	German name	Period	Typology	Material	Area in m^{2}
Stone-Cone Temple	Steinstifttempel	Uruk VI	T-shaped	Limestone and bitumen	x
Limestone Temple	Kalksteintempel	Uruk V	T-shaped	Limestone and bitumen	2373
Riemchen Building	Riemchengebäude	Uruk IVb	unique	Adobe brick	x
Cone-Mosaic Temple	Stiftmosaikgebäude	Uruk IVb	unique	x	x
Temple A	Gebäude A	Uruk IVb	Tripartite	Adobe brick	738
Temple B	Gebäude B	Uruk IVb	Tripartite	Adobe brick	338
Temple C	Gebäude C	Uruk IVb	T-shaped	Adobe brick	1314
Temple/Palace E	Gebäude E	Uruk IVb	unique	Adobe brick	2905
Temple F	Gebäude F	Uruk IVb	T-shaped	Adobe brick	465
Temple G	Gebäude G	Uruk IVb	T-shaped	Adobe brick	734
Temple H	Gebäude H	Uruk IVb	T-shaped	Adobe brick	628
Temple D	Gebäude D	Uruk IVa	T-shaped	Adobe brick	2596
Room I	Gebäude I	Uruk V	x	x	x
Temple J	Gebäude J	Uruk IVb	x	Adobe brick	x
Temple K	Gebäude K	Uruk IVb	x	Adobe brick	x
Temple L	Gebäude L	Uruk V	x	x	x
Temple M	Gebäude M	Uruk IVa	x	Adobe brick	x
Temple N	Gebäude N	Uruk IVb	unique	Adobe brick	x
Temple O	Gebäude O	x	x	x	x
Hall Building/Great Hall	Hallenbau	Uruk IVa	unique	Adobe brick	821
Pillar Hall	Pfeilerhalle	Uruk IVa	unique	x	219
Bath Building	Bäder	Uruk III	unique	x	x
Red Temple	Roter Tempel	Uruk IVa	x	Adobe brick	x
Great Court	Großer Hof	Uruk IVa	unique	Burnt Brick	2873
Rammed-Earth Building	Stampflehm	Uruk III	unique	x	x
Round Pillar Hall	Rundpeifeilerhalle	Uruk IVb	unique	Adobe brick	x
Anu district: 4000–3000 BC
Stone Building	Steingebäude	Uruk VI	unique	Limestone and bitumen	x
White Temple	x	Uruk III	Tripartite	Adobe brick	382

It is clear that Eanna was dedicated to Inanna, symbolized by Venus from the Uruk period. At that time, she was worshipped in four aspects as Inanna of the netherworld (Sumerian: ᵈinanna-kur), Inanna of the morning (Sumerian: ᵈinanna-hud₂), Inanna of the evening (Sumerian: ᵈinanna-sig), and Inanna (Sumerian: ᵈinanna-NUN). The names of four temples in Uruk at this time are known, but it is impossible to match them with either a specific structure and in some cases a deity.

- sanctuary of Inanna (Sumerian: eš-ᵈinanna)
- sanctuary of Inanna of the evening (Sumerian: eš-ᵈinanna-sig)
- temple of heaven (Sumerian: e₂-an)
- temple of heaven and netherworld (Sumerian: e₂-an-ki)
Architecture of Uruk

Plan of Eanna VI–V

Plan of Eanna IVb

Plan of Eanna IVa

Plan of Eanna III

Plan of Neo-Sumerian Eanna

Plan of Anu District Phase E

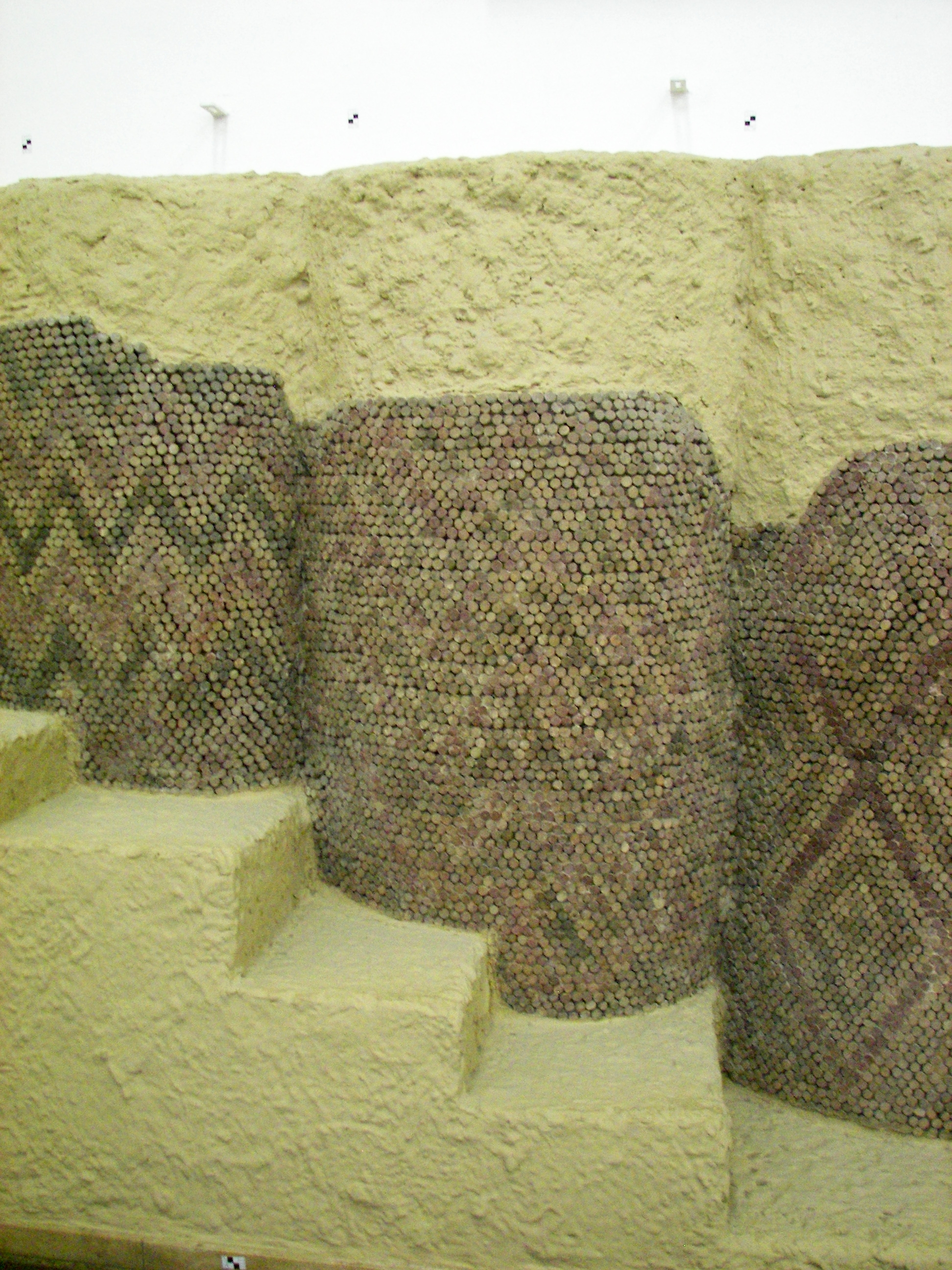
Reconstruction of a mosaic from the Eanna temple

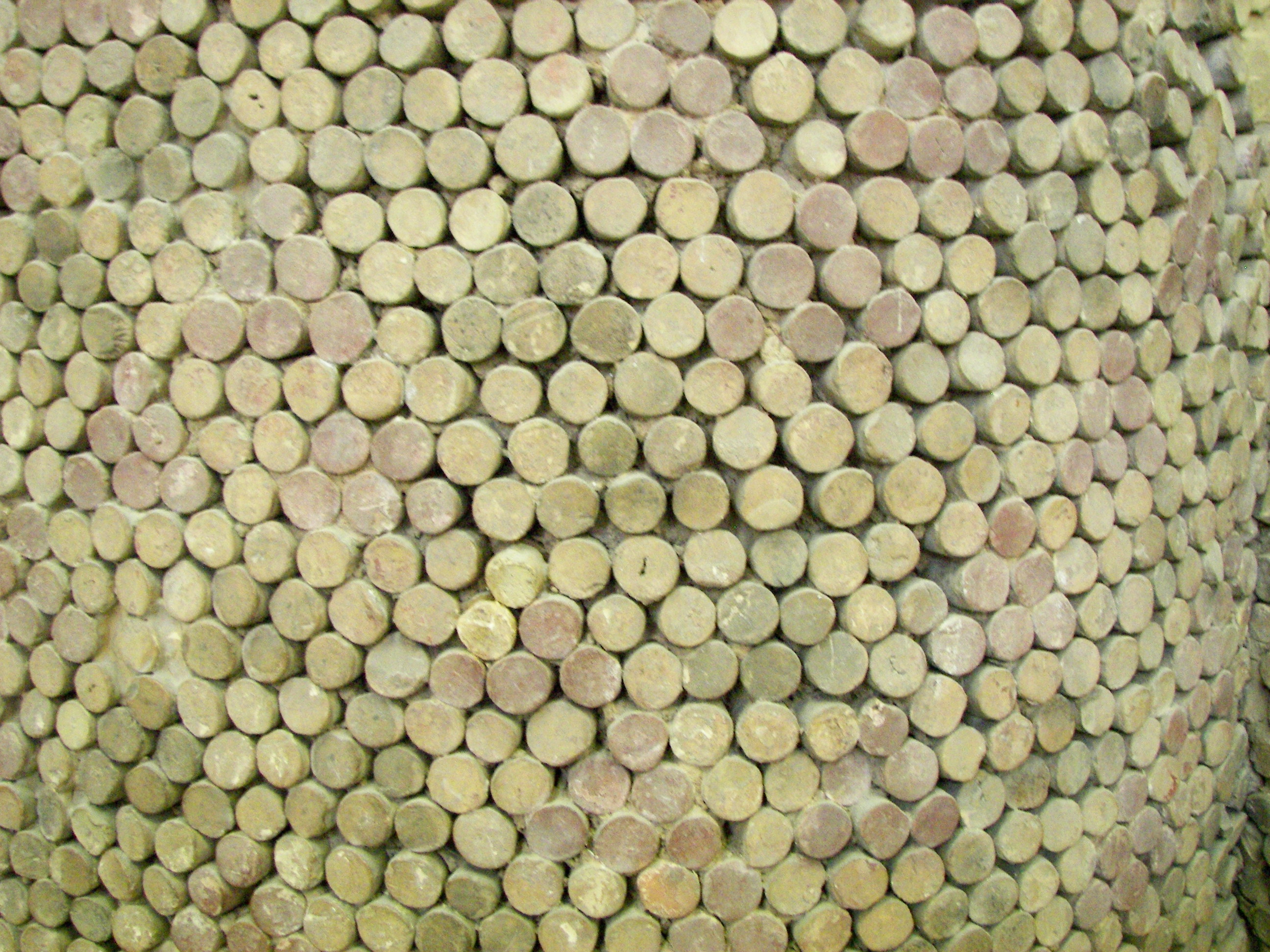
Detail of Reconstruction of a mosaic from the Eanna temple

== Archaeology ==
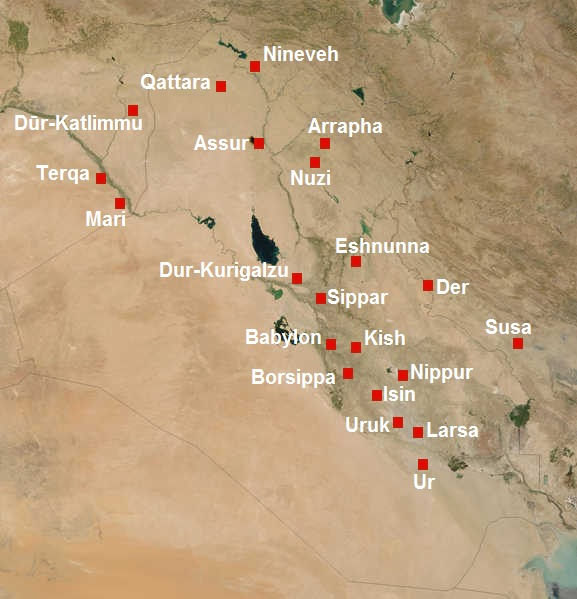
Mesopotamia in the 2nd millennium BC. From north to south: Nineveh, Qattara (or Karana), Dūr-Katlimmu, Assur, Arrapḫa, Terqa, Nuzi, Mari, Eshnunna, Dur-Kurigalzu, Der, Sippar, Babylon, Kish, Susa, Borsippa, Nippur, Isin, Uruk, Larsa and Ur.

By the end of the Uruk period c. 3100 BC) Uruk had reached a size of 250 ha (620 acres). During the following Jemdet Nasr period it grew to a size of 600 ha (1,500 acres) by c. 2800 BC with the main temple area of Eanna being completely rebuilt after leveling the foundations of the Uruk period construction. A new city wall was constructed in this period.

The site, which lies about 50 miles (80 km) northwest of ancient Ur, is one of the largest in the region at around 5.5 km^{2} (2.1 sq mi) in area. The maximum extent is 3 km (1.9 miles) north/south, and 2.5 km (1.6 miles) east/west. There are three major tells within the site: The Eanna district, Bit Resh (Kullaba), and Irigal. Archaeologically, the site is divided into six parts

1. the É-Anna ziggurat ' Egipar-imin,
2. the É-Anna enclosure (Zingel),
3. the Anu-Antum temple complex, BitRes and Anu-ziggurat,
4. Irigal, the South Building,
5. Parthian structures including the Gareus-temple, and the Multiple Apse building,
6. the "Gilgameš" city-wall with associated Sinkâsid Palace and the Seleucid Bit Akîtu.

Reconstruction video of Uruk (English subtitles)

The location of Uruk was first noted by Fraser and Ross in 1835. William Loftus excavated there in 1850 and 1854 after a scouting mission in 1849. By Loftus' own account, he admits that the first excavations were superficial at best, as his financiers forced him to deliver large museum artifacts at a minimal cost. A large basalt stela found by Loftus was later lost. Warka was also scouted by archaeologist Walter Andrae in 1902. In 1905 Warka was visited by archaeologist Edgar James Banks.

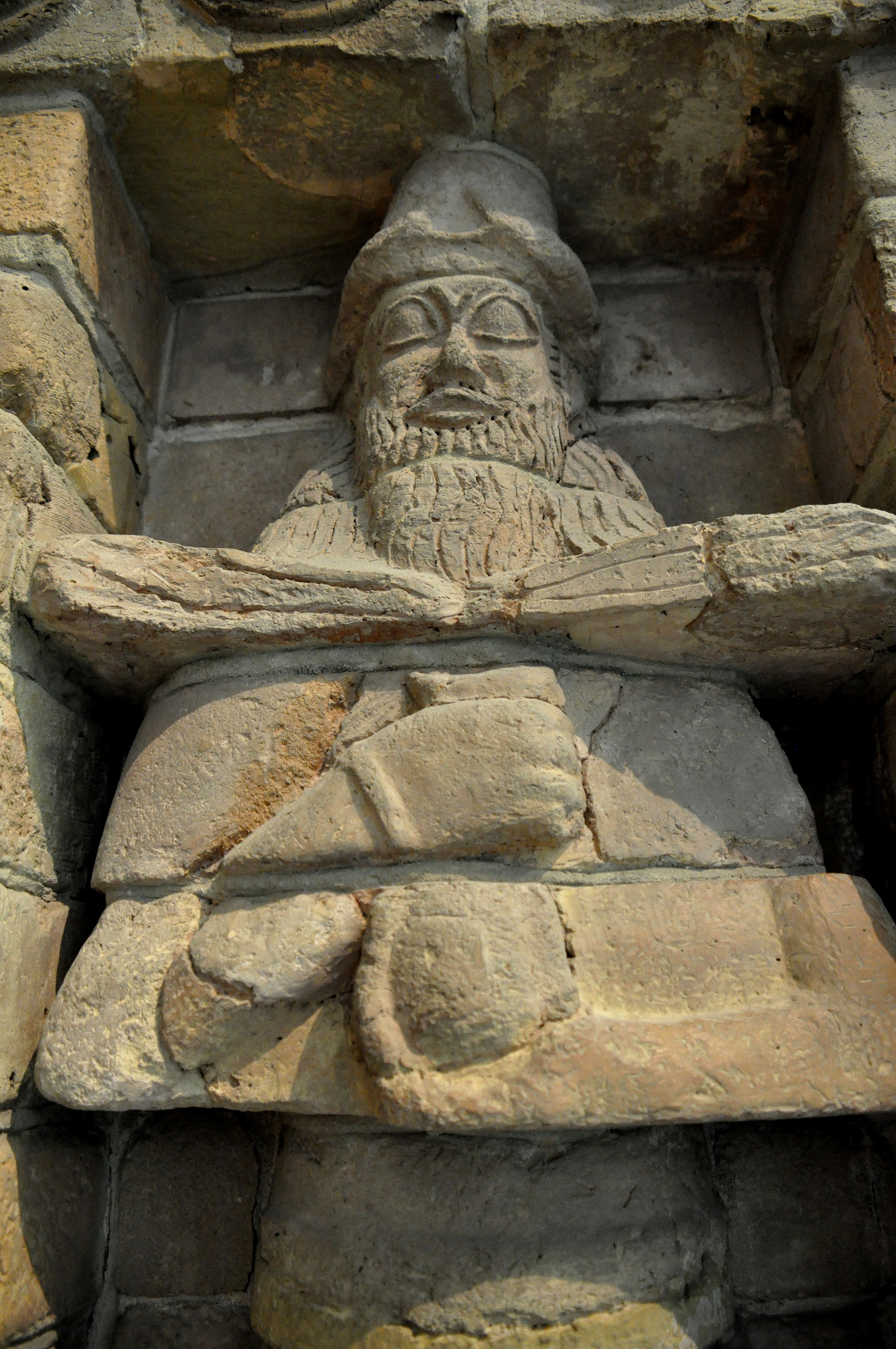
Male deity pouring a life-giving water from a vessel. Facade of Inanna Temple at Uruk, Iraq. 15th century BC. The Pergamon Museum.

From 1912 to 1913, Julius Jordan and his team from the German Oriental Society discovered the temple of Ishtar, one of four known temples located at the site. The temples at Uruk were quite remarkable as they were constructed with brick and adorned with colorful mosaics. Jordan also discovered part of the city wall. It was later discovered that this 40-to-50-foot (12 to 15 m) high brick wall, probably utilized as a defense mechanism, totally encompassed the city at a length of 9 km (5.6 mi). Utilizing sedimentary strata dating techniques, this wall is estimated to have been erected around 3000 BC. Jordan produced a contour map of the entire site. The GOS returned to Uruk in 1928 and excavated until 1939, when World War II intervened. The team was led by Jordan until 1931 when Jordan became Director of Antiquities in Baghdad, then by A. Nöldeke, Ernst Heinrich, and H. J. Lenzen. Among the finds was the Stela of the Lion Hunt, excavated in a Jemdat Nadr layer but stylistically dated to Uruk IV.

The German excavations resumed after the war and were under the direction of Heinrich Lenzen from 1954 to 1967. He was followed in 1968 by J. Schmidt, and in 1978 by R.M. Boehmer. In total, the German archaeologists spent 39 seasons working at Uruk. The results are documented in two series of reports:

- Ausgrabungen der Deutschen Forschungsgemeinschaft in Uruk (ADFU), 17 volumes, 1912–2001
- Ausgrabungen in Uruk-Warka, Endberichte (AUWE), 25 volumes, 1987–2007

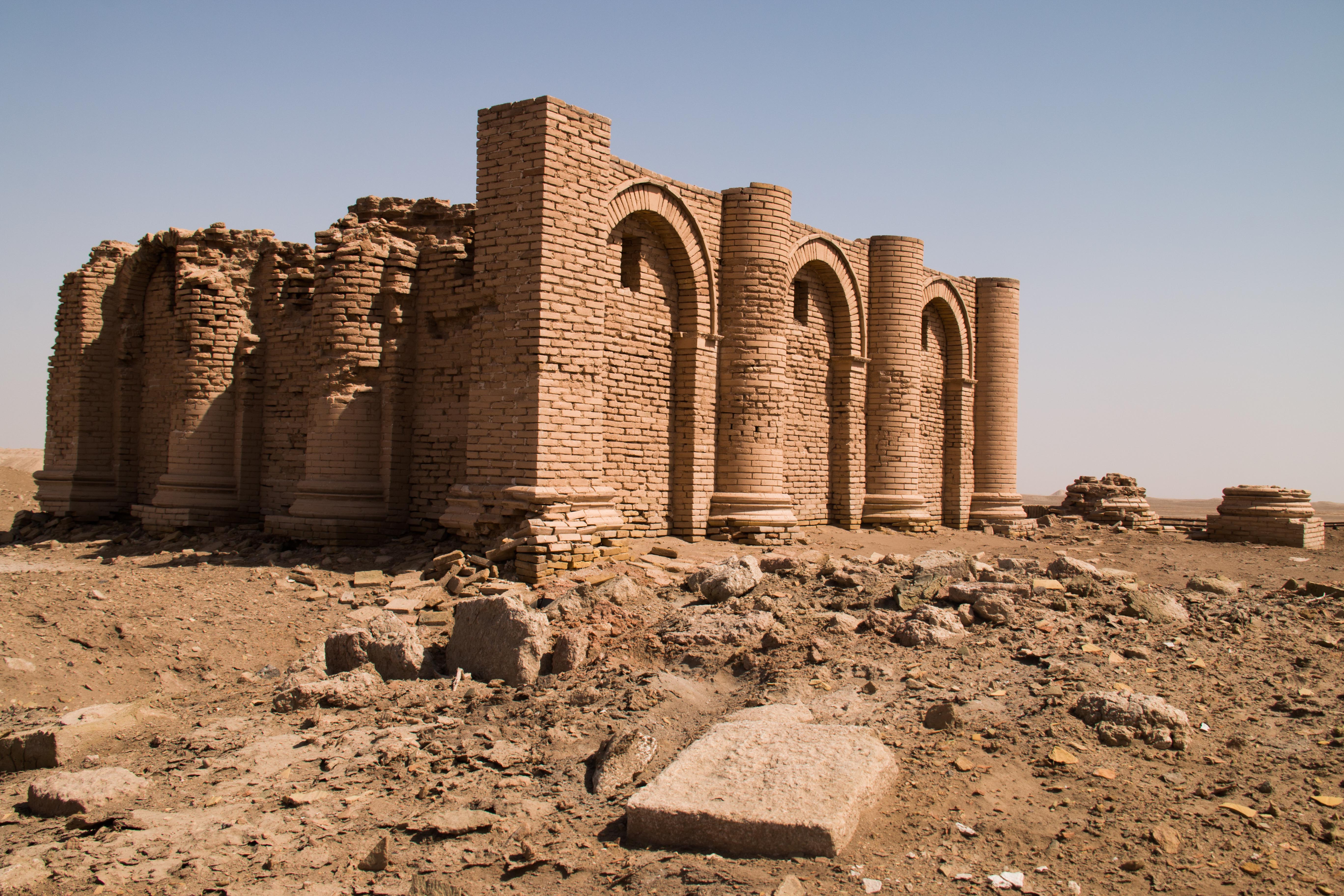
Ruins of the Temple of Gareus at Uruk, c. 100 CE

Most recently, from 2001 to 2002, the German Archaeological Institute team led by Margarete van Ess, with Joerg Fassbinder and Helmut Becker, conducted a partial magnetometer survey in Uruk. In addition to the geophysical survey, core samples and aerial photographs were taken. This was followed up with high-resolution satellite imagery in 2005. Work resumed in 2016 and is currently concentrated on the city wall area and a survey of the surrounding landscape. Part of the work has been to create a digital twin of the Uruk archaeological area. The current effort also involves geophysical surveying. The soil characteristics of the site make ground penetrating radar unsuitable so caesium magnetometers, combined with electrical resistivity probes, are being used. Afterward 25 sediment cores, up to 13 meters deep, were done in 2024 and 2025 and a virtual geophysical topology of the Uruk area was produced.

=== Cuneiform tablets ===
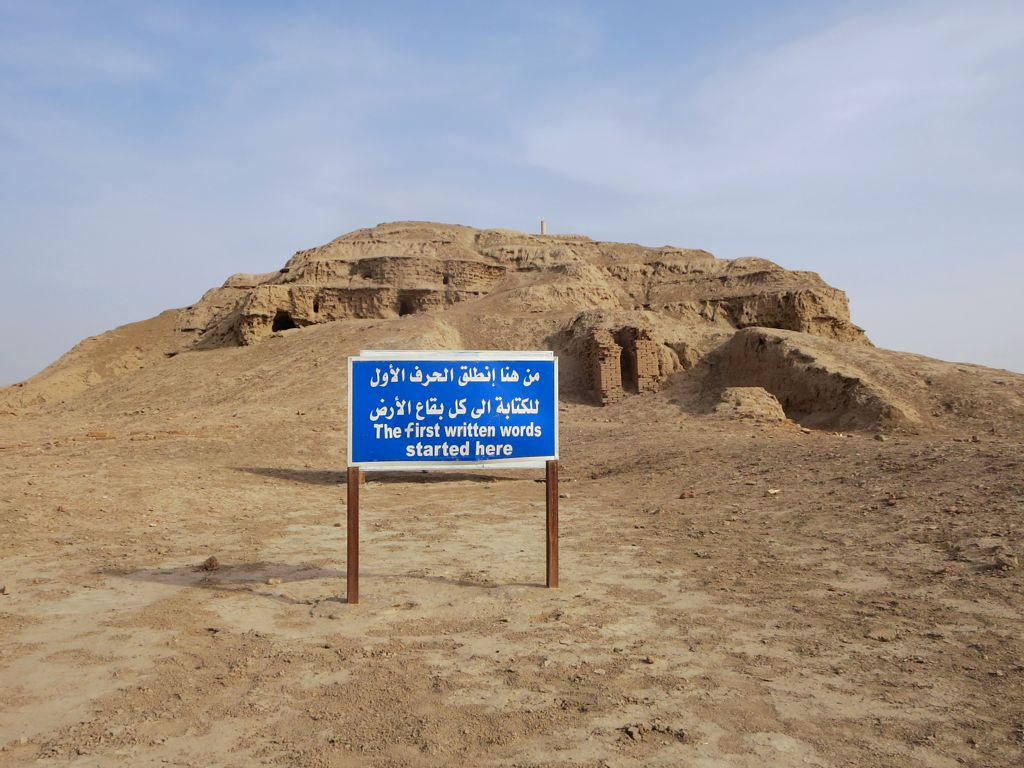
A massive ziggurat dating from the 4th millennium BC stands at the entrance to Uruk (Warka), 39 km east of Samawah, Iraq

A number of Proto-cuneiform clay tablets were found at Uruk. Around 190 were Uruk V period (c. 3500 BC) "numerical tablets" or "impressed tablets", 1776 were from the Uruk IV period (c. 3300 BC), 3,094 from the Uruk III period (c. 3200–2900 BC) which is also called the Jemdet Nasr period. Later cuneiform tablets were deciphered and include the famous SKL, a record of kings of the Sumerian civilization. There was an even larger cache of legal and scholarly tablets of the Neo-Babylonian, Late Babylonian, and Seleucid period, that have been published by Adam Falkenstein and other Assyriological members of the German Archaeological Institute in Baghdad as Jan J. A. Djik, Hermann Hunger, Antoine Cavigneaux, Egbert von Weiher, and Karlheinz Kessler, or others as Erlend Gehlken. Many of the cuneiform tablets form acquisitions by museums and collections as the British Museum, Yale Babylonian Collection, and the Louvre. The latter holds a unique cuneiform tablet in Aramaic known as the Aramaic Uruk incantation. The last dated cuneiform tablet from Uruk was W22340a, an astronomical almanac, which is dated to 79 or 80 AD.

The oldest known writing to feature a person's name was found in Uruk, in the form of several tablets that mention Kushim, who (assuming they are an individual person) served as an accountant recording transactions made in trading barley – 29,086 measures barley 37 months Kushim.

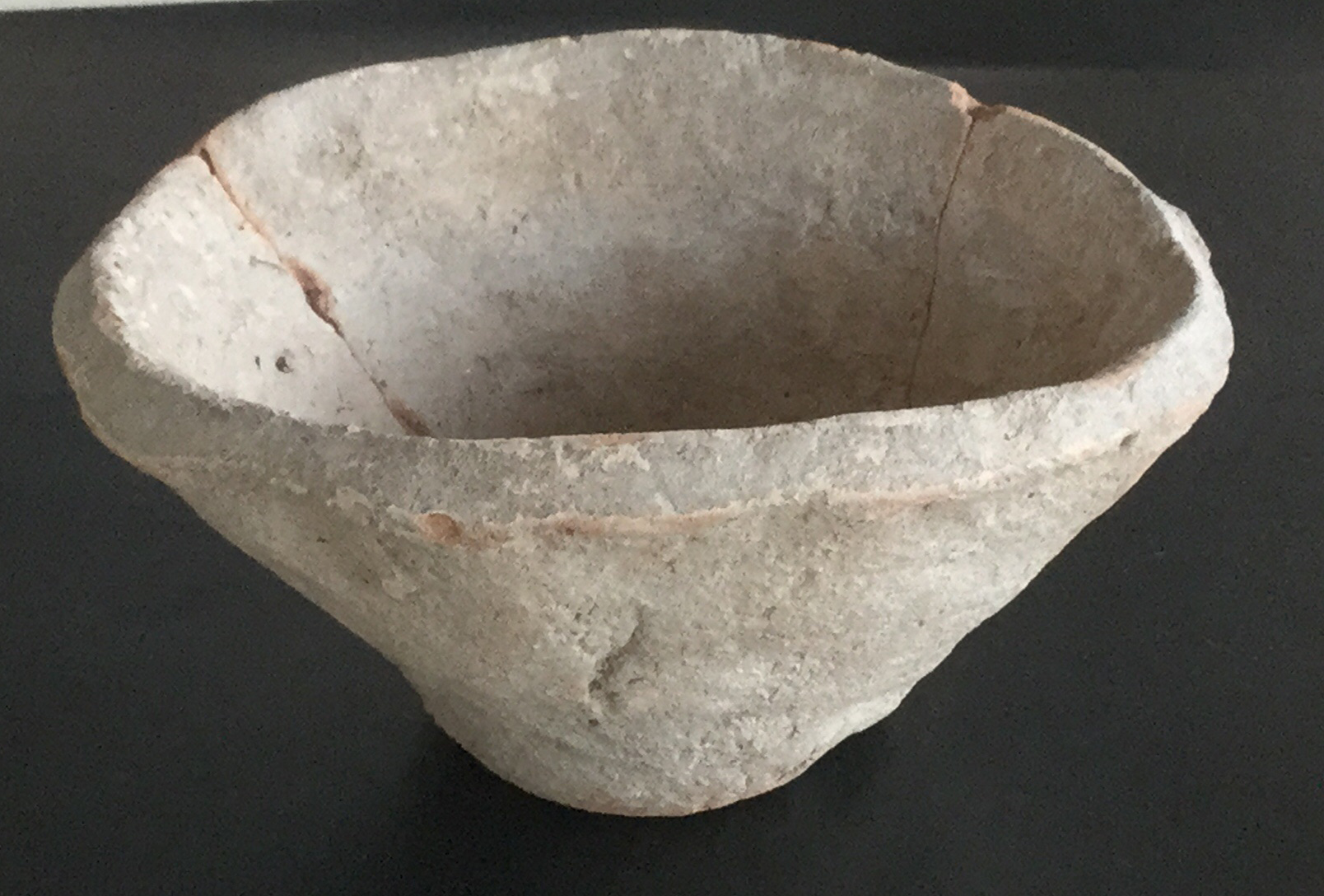
Late Uruk Period beveled rim bowls used for ration distribution

Beveled rim bowls were the most common type of container used during the Uruk period. They are believed to be vessels for serving rations of food or drink to dependent laborers. The introduction of the fast wheel for throwing pottery was developed during the later part of the Uruk period, and made the mass production of pottery simpler and more standardized.

=== Artifacts ===
The Mask of Warka, also known as the 'Lady of Uruk' and the 'Sumerian Mona Lisa', dating from 3100 BC, is one of the earliest representations of the human face. The carved marble female face is probably a depiction of Inanna. It is approximately 20 cm (7.9 in) tall, and may have been incorporated into a larger cult image. The mask was looted from the Iraq Museum during the invasion of Iraq in April 2003. It was recovered in September 2003 and returned to the museum.

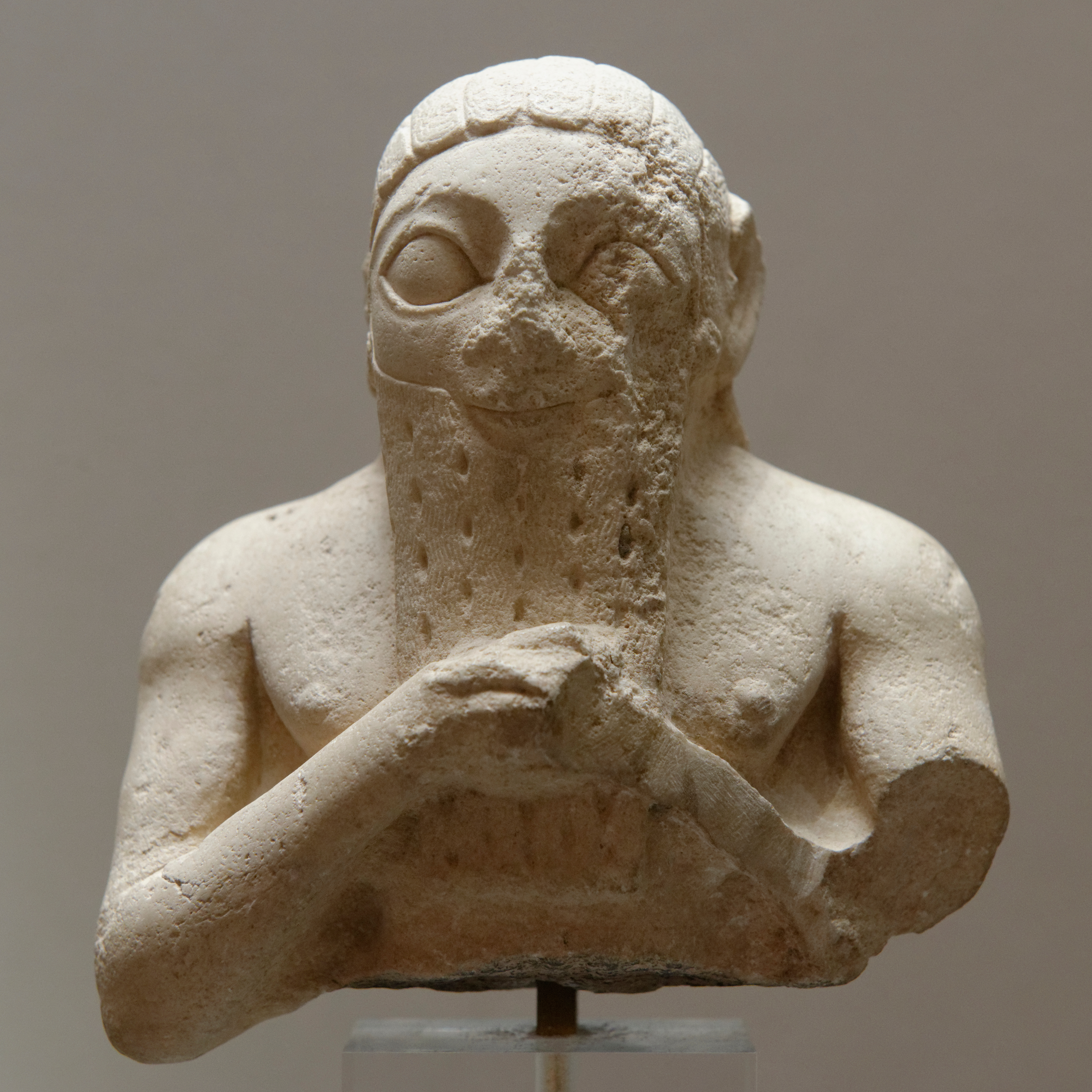
Lugal-kisalsi, king of Uruk

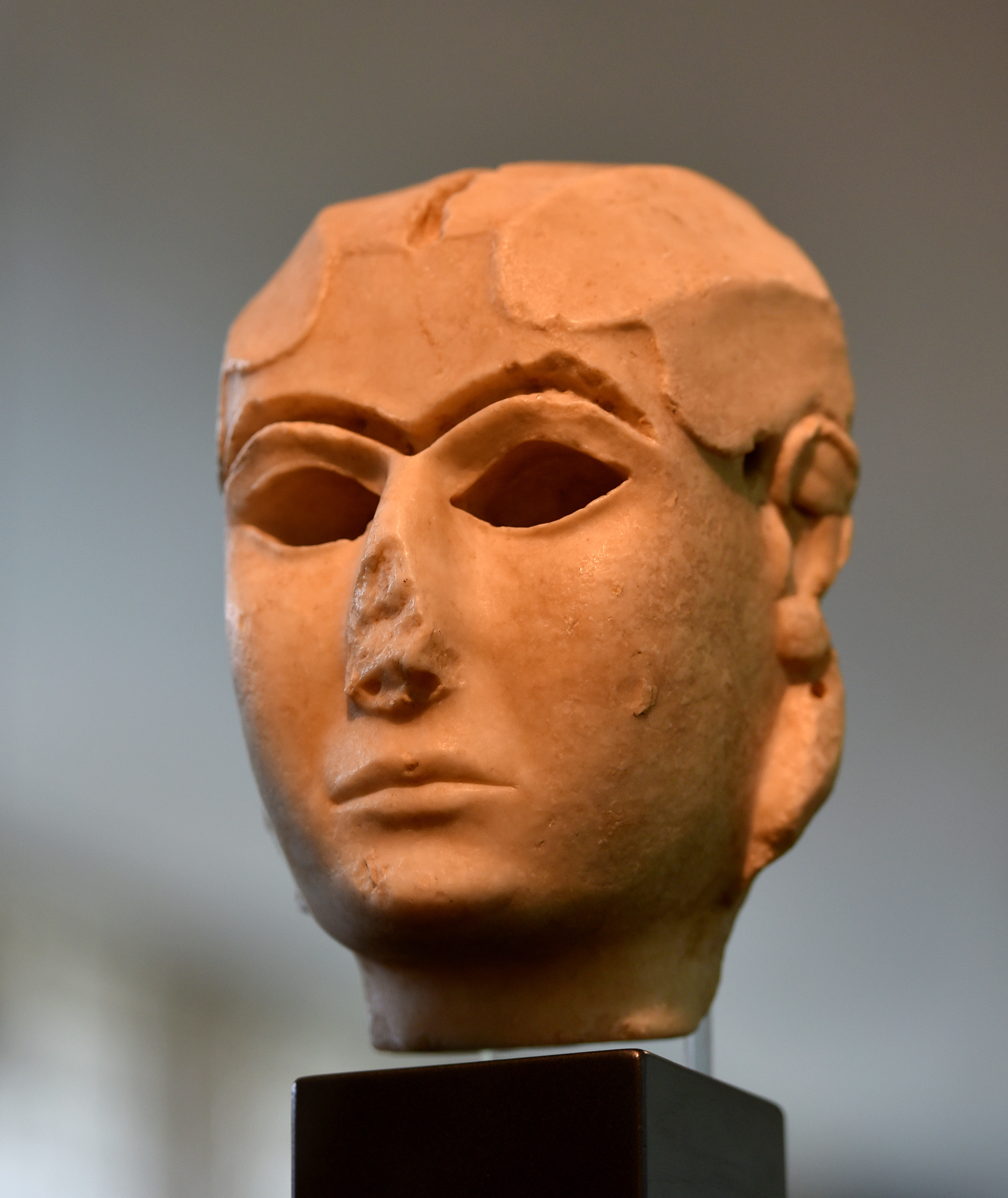
Mask of Warka

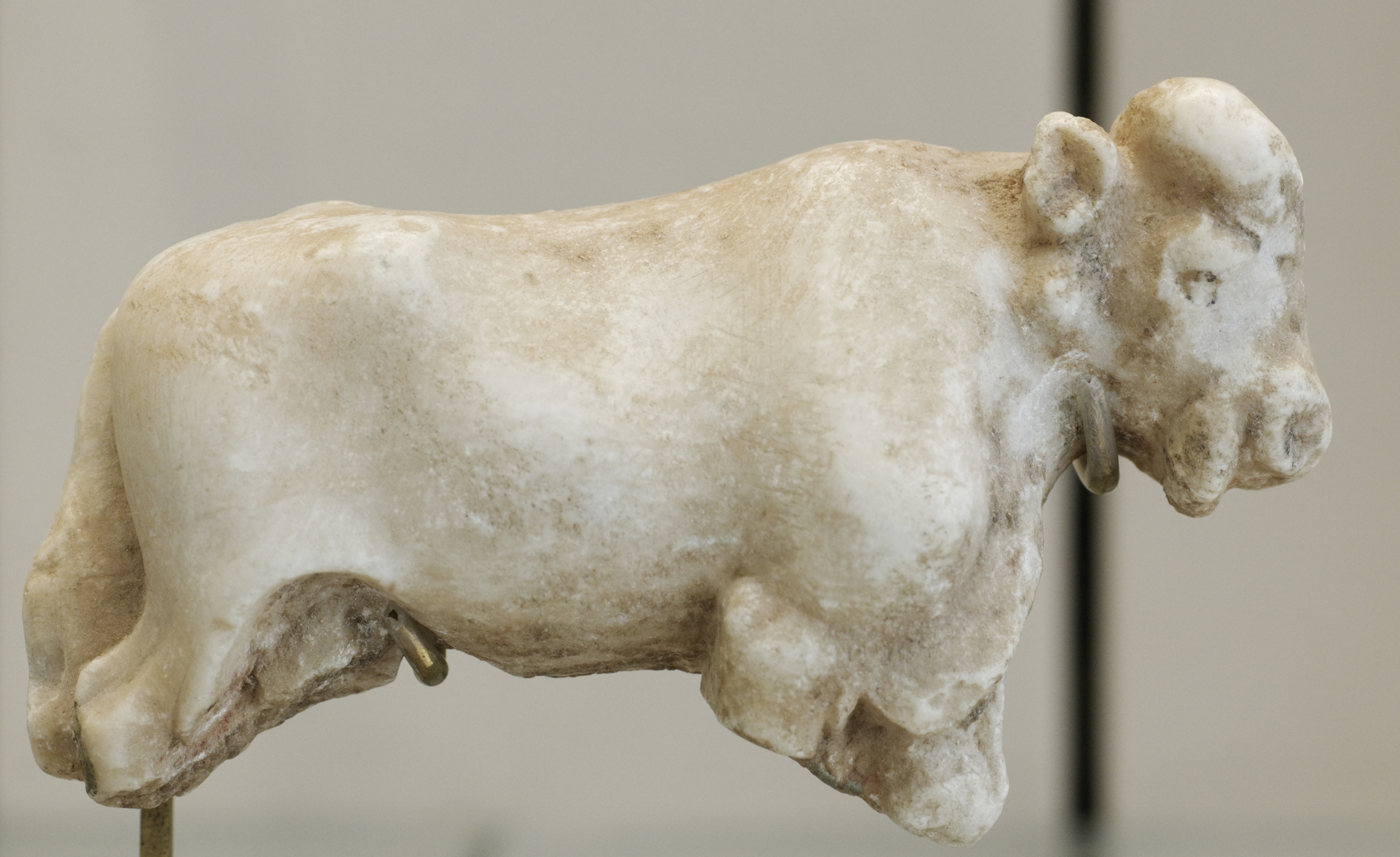
Bull sculpture, Jemdet Nasr period, c. 3000 BC

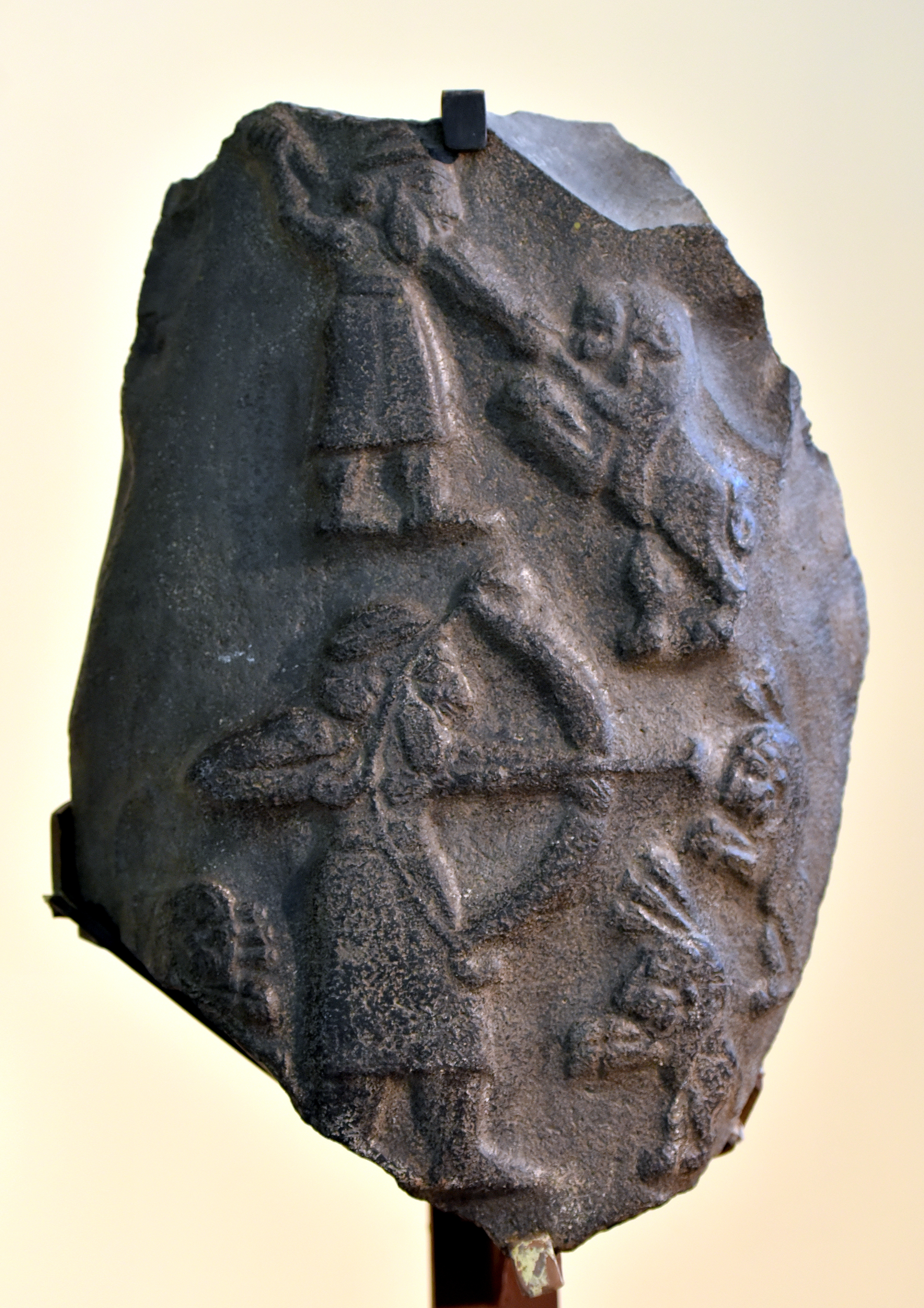
Stele of the Lion Hunt – Uruk period

=== Archaeological levels of Uruk ===
Archeologists have discovered multiple cities of Uruk built atop each other in chronological order.

- Uruk XVIII Eridu period (c. 5000 BC): the founding of Uruk
- Uruk XVIII–XVI Late Ubaid period (4800–4200 BC)
- Uruk XVI–X Early Uruk period (4000–3800 BC)
- Uruk IX–VI Middle Uruk period (3800–3400 BC)
- Uruk V–IV Late Uruk period (3400–3100 BC): the earliest monumental temples of Eanna District are built
- Uruk III Jemdet Nasr period (3100–2900 BC): the 9 km city wall is built
- Uruk II
- Uruk I

=== Anu District ===
Anu/ White Temple ziggurat
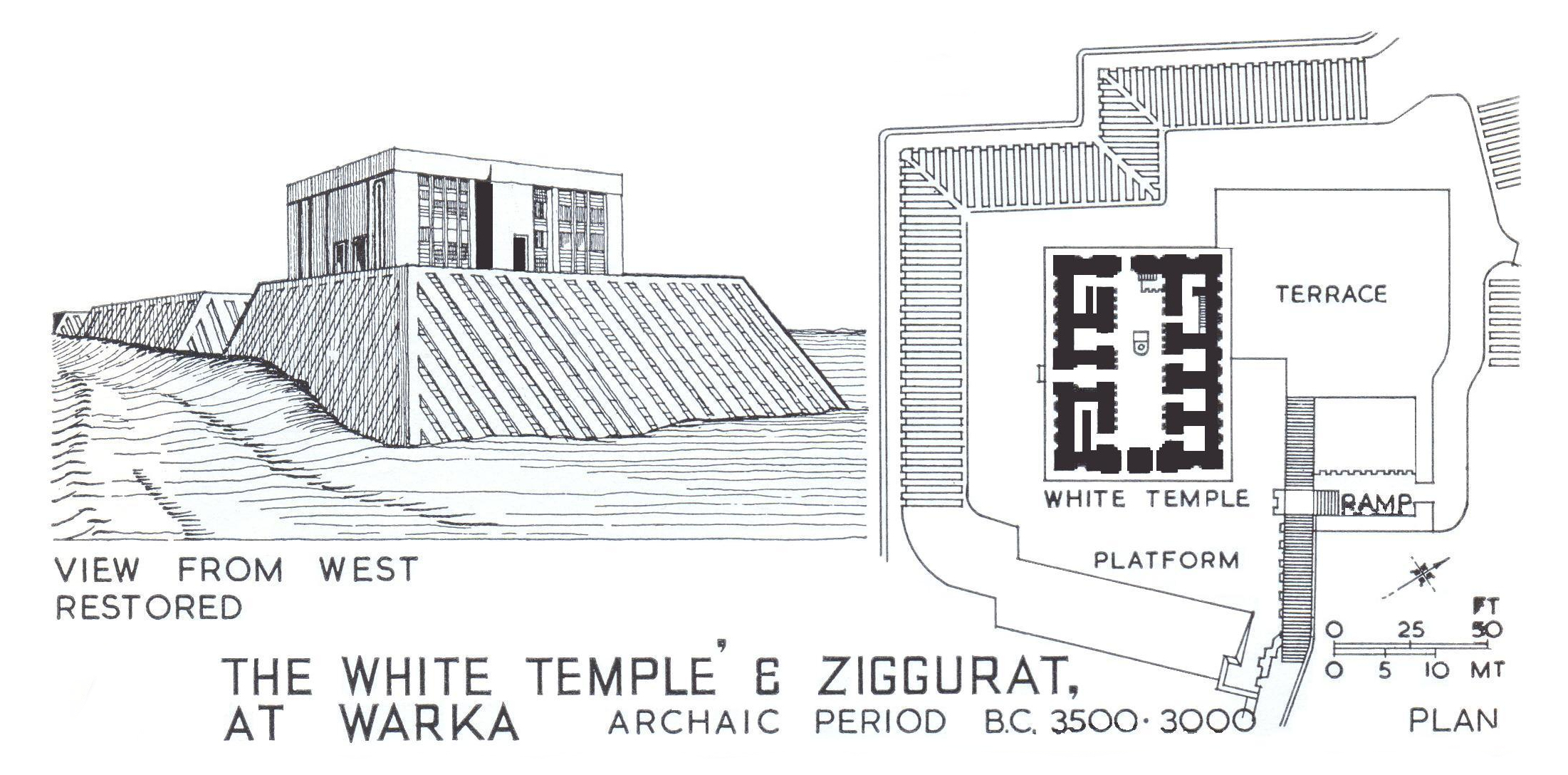
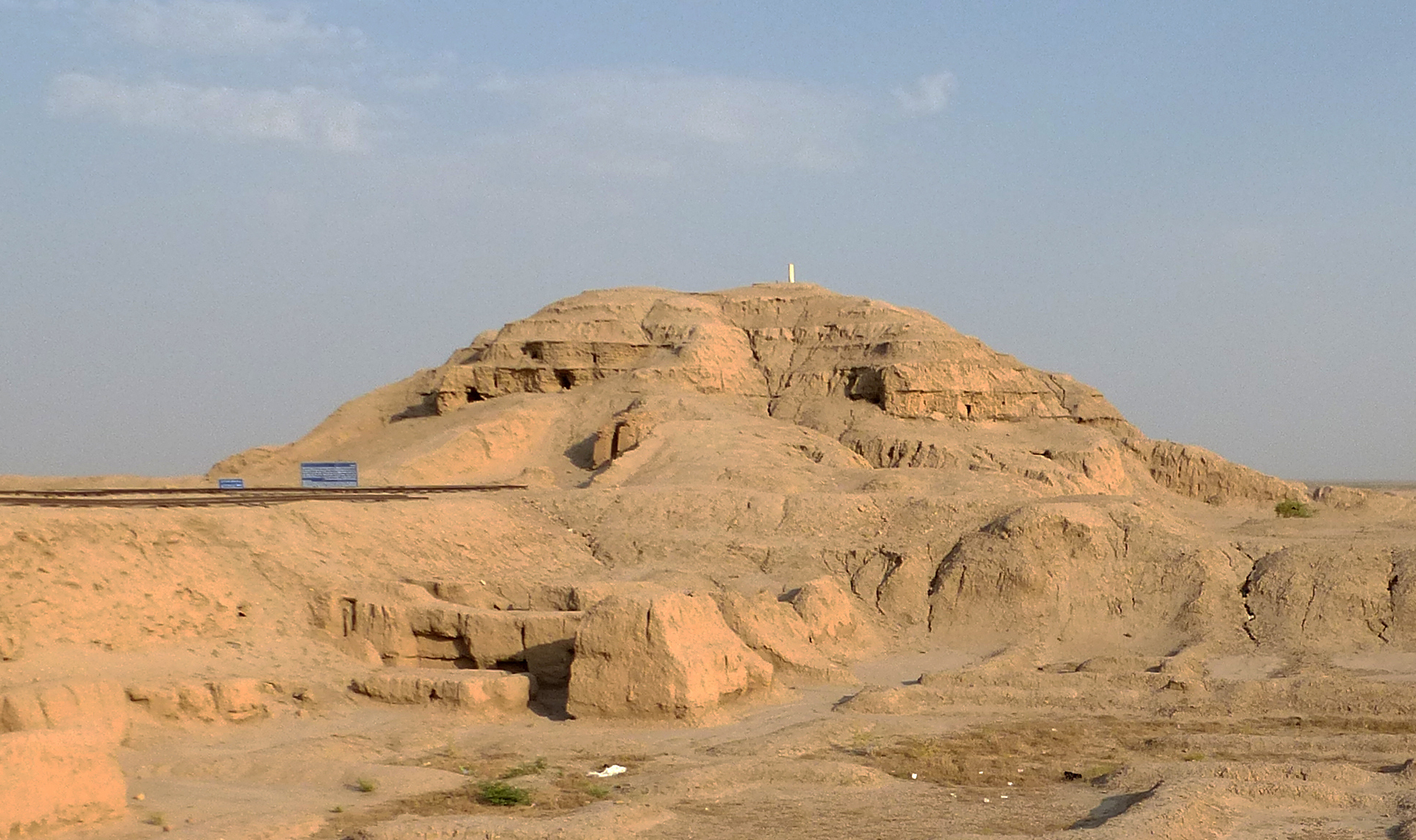

The area traditionally called the Anu district consists of a single massive terrace, the Anu ziggurat, originally proposed to have been dedicated to the Sumerian sky god Anu.

The Stone Temple was built of limestone and bitumen on a podium of rammed earth and plastered with lime mortar. The podium itself was built over a woven reed mat called ĝiparu, which was ritually used as a nuptial bed. The ĝiparu was a source of generative power which then radiated upward into the structure. The structure of the Stone Temple further develops some mythological concepts from Enuma Elish, perhaps involving libation rites as indicated from the channels, tanks, and vessels found there. The structure was ritually destroyed, covered with alternating layers of clay and stone, then excavated and filled with mortar sometime later.

=== Eanna District ===
Eanna IVa (light brown) and IVb (dark brown)

The Eanna district is historically significant as both writing and monumental public architecture emerged here during Uruk periods VI–IV. The combination of these two developments places Eanna as arguably the first true city and civilization in human history. Eanna during period IVa contains the earliest examples of writing.

The first building of Eanna, Stone-Cone Temple (Mosaic Temple), was built in period VI over a preexisting Ubaid temple and is enclosed by a limestone wall with an elaborate system of buttresses. The Stone-Cone Temple, named for the mosaic of colored stone cones driven into the adobe brick façade, may be the earliest water cult in Mesopotamia. It was "destroyed by force" in Uruk IVb period and its contents interred in the Riemchen Building.

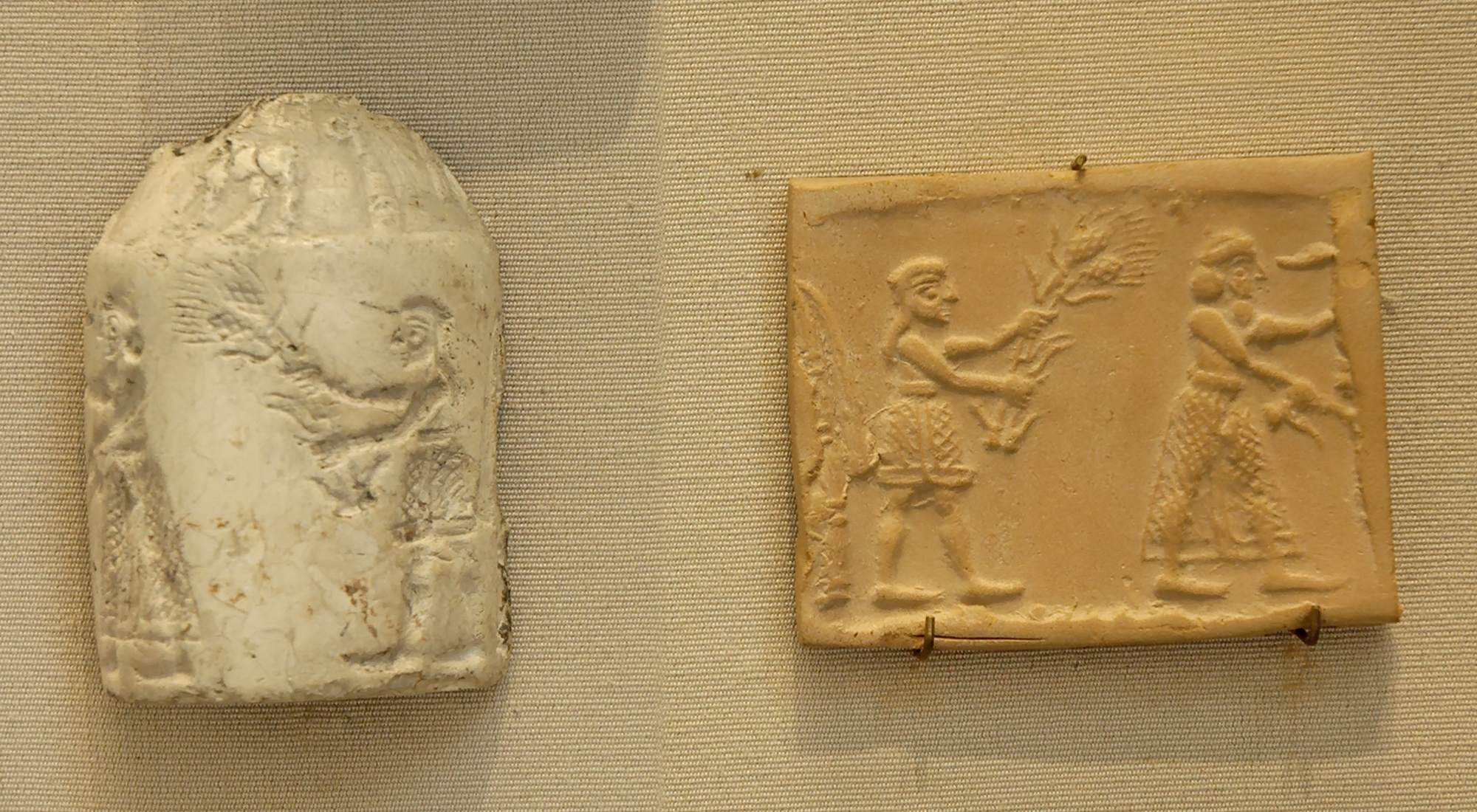
An Uruk period cylinder-seal and its impression, c. 3100 BC. Louvre.

In the following period, Uruk V, about 100 m east of the Stone-Cone Temple the Limestone Temple was built on a 2 m high rammed-earth podium over a pre-existing Ubaid temple, which like the Stone-Cone Temple represents a continuation of Ubaid culture. However, the Limestone Temple was unprecedented for its size and use of stone, a clear departure from traditional Ubaid architecture. The stone was quarried from an outcrop at Umayyad about 60 km east of Uruk. It is unclear if the entire temple or just the foundation was built of this limestone. The Limestone Temple is probably the first Inanna temple, but it is impossible to know with certainty. Like the Stone-Cone temple the Limestone temple was also covered in cone mosaics. Both of these temples were rectangles with their corners aligned to the cardinal directions, a central hall flanked along the long axis by two smaller halls, and buttressed façades; the prototype of all future Mesopotamian temple architectural typology.

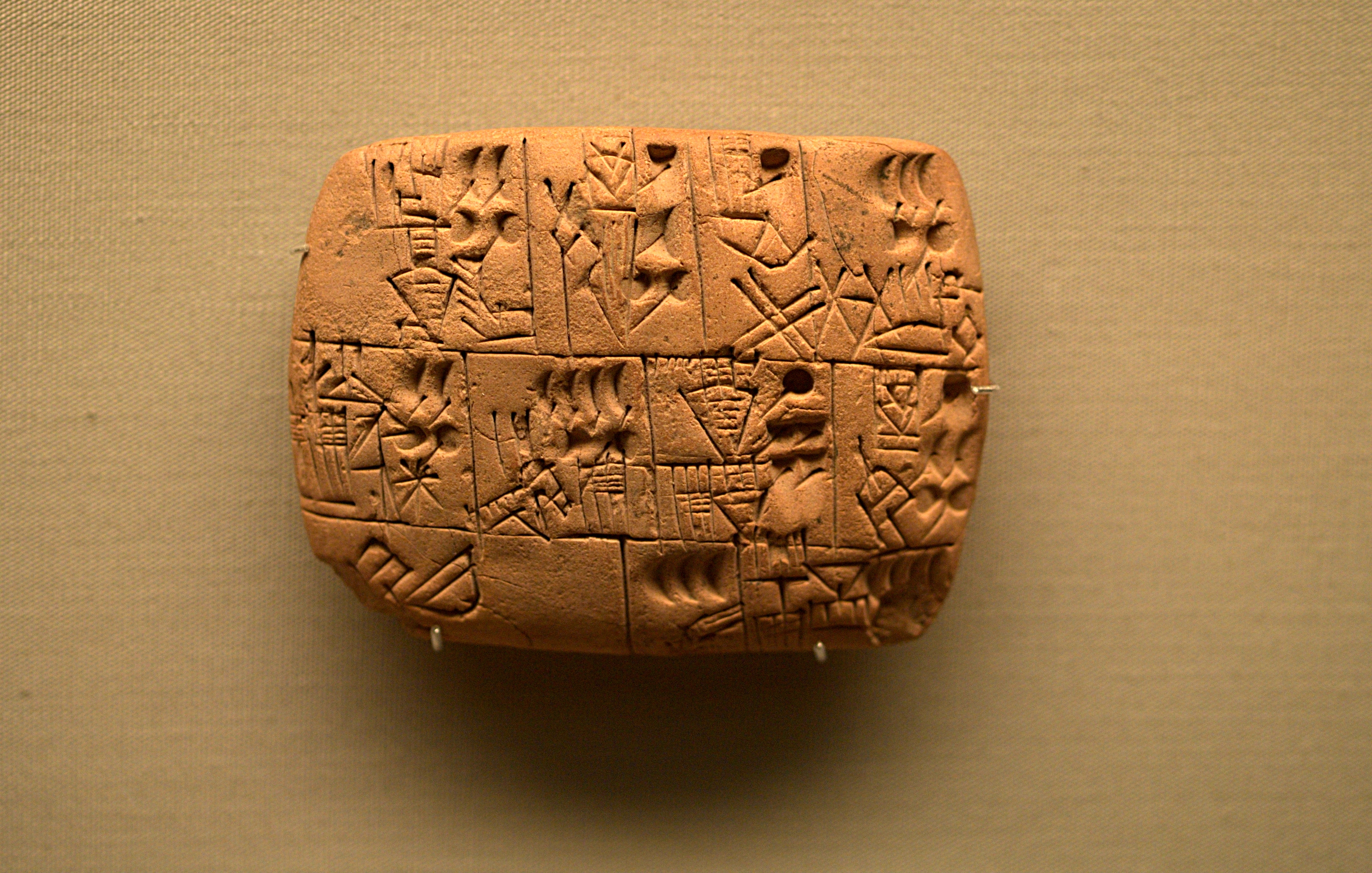
Tablet from Uruk III (c. 3200–3000 BC) recording beer distributions from the storerooms of an institution, British Museum

Between these two monumental structures a complex of buildings (called A–C, E–K, Riemchen, Cone-Mosaic), courts, and walls was built during Eanna IVb. These buildings were built during a time of great expansion in Uruk as the city grew to 250 ha (620 acres) and established long-distance trade, and are a continuation of architecture from the previous period. The Riemchen Building, named for the 16 cm (6.3 in)×16 cm (6.3 in) brick shape called Riemchen by the Germans, is a memorial with a ritual fire kept burning in the center for the Stone-Cone Temple after it was destroyed. For this reason, Uruk IV period represents a reorientation of belief and culture. The facade of this memorial may have been covered in geometric and figural murals. The Riemchen bricks first used in this temple were used to construct all buildings of Uruk IV period Eanna. The use of colored cones as a façade treatment was greatly developed as well, perhaps used to greatest effect in the Cone-Mosaic Temple. Composed of three parts: Temple N, the Round Pillar Hall, and the Cone-Mosaic Courtyard, this temple was the most monumental structure of Eanna at the time. They were all ritually destroyed and the entire Eanna district was rebuilt in period IVa at an even grander scale.

During Eanna IVa, the Limestone Temple was demolished and the Red Temple built on its foundations. The accumulated debris of the Uruk IVb buildings were formed into a terrace, the L-Shaped Terrace, on which Buildings C, D, M, Great Hall, and Pillar Hall were built. Building E was initially thought to be a palace, but later proven to be a communal building. Also in period IV, the Great Court, a sunken courtyard surrounded by two tiers of benches covered in cone mosaic, was built. A small aqueduct drains into the Great Courtyard, which may have irrigated a garden at one time. The impressive buildings of this period were built as Uruk reached its zenith and expanded to 600 hectares. All the buildings of Eanna IVa were destroyed sometime in Uruk III, for unclear reasons.

The architecture of Eanna in period III was very different from what had preceded it. The complex of monumental temples was replaced with baths around the Great Courtyard and the labyrinthine Rammed-Earth Building. This period corresponds to Early Dynastic Sumer c. 2900 BC, a time of great social upheaval when the dominance of Uruk was eclipsed by competing city-states. The fortress-like architecture of this time is a reflection of that turmoil. The temple of Inanna continued functioning during this time in a new form and under a new name, 'The House of Inanna in Uruk' (Sumerian: e₂-ᵈinanna unuᵏⁱ-ga). The location of this structure is currently unknown.

=== Possible tomb of Gilgamesh ===
Media interest was excited in 2003 by a report that the German Archaeological Institute team had discovered something that might be the tomb of the legendary king Gilgamesh. The Sumerian poem The Death of Gilgamesh describes how the River Euphrates parted after Gilgamesh died and he was buried underneath it, before the river was restored to its course. The Euphrates has changed its course since the time when Gilgamesh is supposed to have lived, and the route it followed then is now dry. In an interview, Fassbinder was careful to state that they had no solid proof and that the structure had not been excavated and they would not know unless it was, but said that magnetometric scans had revealed buried structures in the former bed of the Euphrates that matched the description in the poem. He commented that other scans of that part of the site so far were a surprisingly good match for Sumerian descriptions of Uruk as it was in Gilgamesh's day, making the theory that the poem was also right about the tomb more plausible.

The invasion of Iraq happened shortly after the announcement. The site at Uruk escaped looting during the war, and further investigations have been done there since then, but there has been no further public comment on the possible tomb. When asked about it by an independent researcher, Fassbinder was reticent, saying only that the media coverage had been exaggerated and that he had only said that it might be the tomb of Gilgamesh.

== List of rulers ==
The Sumerian King List (SKL) lists only 22 rulers among five dynasties of Uruk. The sixth dynasty was an Amorite dynasty not mentioned on the SKL. The following list should not be considered complete.

Rulers in orange are legendary figures with notably uncertain historicity.

#	Depiction	Ruler	Succession	Epithet	Approx. dates	Notes
Early Dynastic I period (c. 2900 – c. 2700 BC)
First dynasty of Uruk / Uruk I dynasty (c. 2900 – c. 2700 BC)
"Then Kish was defeated and the kingship was taken to Eanna (Uruk)." — Sumerian King List (SKL)
1st		Meshkiangasher 𒈩𒆠𒉘𒂵𒊺𒅕	Son of Utu		reigned c. 2775 BC (324 years)	Said on the SKL to have held the titles of both "Lord" and "King" of Eanna (Uruk); furthermore, held the "Kingship" over all of Sumer; He has been compared with Biblical Cush; His reign has long been suspected to be a fabrication from the Ur III period
"Meshkiangasher entered the sea and disappeared." — SKL
2nd		Enmerkar 𒂗𒈨𒅕𒃸	Son of Meshkiangasher	"the king of Uruk, who built Uruk"	r. c. 2750, c. 2730 BC (420 years)	Said to have reigned for at least 50 years in the tale of Lugalbanda and the Anzud Bird; Said to have invented writing and to have besieged Aratta for up to a year in the legend of Enmerkar and the Lord of Aratta; Said on the SKL to have held the title of, "King" of not just Uruk; but, to have held the "Kingship" over all of Sumer
3rd		Lugalbanda 𒈗𒌉𒁕		"the shepherd"	r. c. 2700 BC (1,200 years)	Said to have been a soldier in the army of Enmerkar in the tale of Lugalbanda in the Mountain Cave; Described as "the shepherd" for his epiphet on the SKL and to have held the title of "king" of not just Uruk; but, all of Sumer; Historicity uncertain
4th		Dumuzid 𒌉𒍣𒋗𒄩		"the fisherman whose city was Kuara"	r. c. 2700 BC (110 years)	Defeated invading forces headed by Gudam; temp. of Enmebaragesi; Historicity uncertain
Early Dynastic II period (c. 2700 – c. 2600 BC)
5th		Gilgamesh 𒀭𒄑𒉋𒂵𒈨𒌋𒌋𒌋	Son of Lugalbanda (?)	"the lord of Kulaba"	r. c. 2700, c. 2670, c. 2650 BC (126 years)	Built the walls of Uruk; temp. of and victorious over Aga; Historicity certain
6th		Ur-Nungal 𒌨𒀭𒉣𒃲	Son of Gilgamesh		r. c. 2650 – c. 2620 BC (30 years)	Said on the SKL to have held the title of, "King" of not just Uruk; but, to have held the "Kingship" over all of Sumer; Known from the Tummal Chronicle; Historicity uncertain
7th		Udul-kalama 𒌋𒊨𒌦𒈠	Son of Ur-Nungal		r. c. 2620 – c. 2605 BC (15 years)	Said on the SKL to have held the title of, "King" of not just Uruk; but, to have held the "Kingship" over all of Sumer; Known from the SKL; very little otherwise; Historicity uncertain
8th		La-ba'shum 𒆷𒁀𒀪𒋳			r. c. 2605 – c. 2596 BC (9 years)	Said on the SKL to have held the title of, "King" of not just Uruk; but, to have held the "Kingship" over all of Sumer; Known from the SKL; very little otherwise; Historicity uncertain
9th		En-nun-tarah-ana 𒂗𒉣𒁰𒀭𒈾			r. c. 2596 – c. 2588 BC (8 years)	Said on the SKL to have held the title of, "King" of not just Uruk; but, to have held the "Kingship" over all of Sumer; Known from the SKL; very little otherwise; Historicity uncertain
10th		Mesh-he 𒈩𒃶		"the smith"	r. c. 2588 – c. 2552 BC (36 years)	Said on the SKL to have held the title of, "King" of not just Uruk; but, to have held the "Kingship" over all of Sumer; Known from the SKL; very little otherwise; Historicity uncertain
11th		Melem-ana 𒈨𒉈𒀭𒈾			r. c. 2552 – c. 2546 BC (6 years)	Said on the SKL to have held the title of, "King" of not just Uruk; but, to have held the "Kingship" over all of Sumer; Known from the SKL; very little otherwise; Historicity uncertain
12th		Lugal-kitun 𒈗𒆠𒂅			r. c. 2546 – c. 2510 BC (36 years)	Said on the SKL to have held the title of, "King" of not just Uruk; but, to have held the "Kingship" over all of Sumer; Known from the SKL; very little otherwise; Historicity uncertain
"12 kings; they ruled for 2,310 years. Then Uruk was defeated and the kingship was taken to Ur." — SKL
Early Dynastic IIIa period (c. 2550 – c. 2500 BC)
		Lumma 𒈝𒈠			Uncertain; these two rulers may have fl. c. 2600 – c. 2500 BC sometime during the Early Dynastic (ED) IIIa period	Historicity certain, attested from tablet from Shuruppak now in the Istanbul museum.; temp. of Menunsi
		Ursangpae			Uncertain; these two rulers may have fl. c. 2600 – c. 2500 BC sometime during the Early Dynastic (ED) IIIa period	Historicity certain; temp. of Ur-Pabilsag
#	Depiction	Ruler	Succession	Epithet	Approx. dates	Notes
Early Dynastic IIIb period (c. 2500 – c. 2350 BC)
		Lugalnamniršumma 𒈗𒉆𒉪𒋧			Uncertain; these two rulers may have fl. c. 2500 – c. 2400 BC sometime during the ED IIIb period	Historicity certain; temp. of Akurgal; "King of Kish"
		Lugalsilâsi I 𒈗𒋻𒋛			Uncertain; these two rulers may have fl. c. 2500 – c. 2400 BC sometime during the ED IIIb period	temp. of Ush; Assaulted Girsu on ten separate occasions; "King of Kish"
		Meskalamdug 𒈩𒌦𒄭			r. c. 2600, c. 2500 BC	"King of Kish"; temp. of Enakalle
		Mesannepada 𒈩𒀭𒉌𒅆𒊒𒁕			r. c. 2500 BC (80 years)	Historicity certain; "King of Kish"; temp. of Ur-Lumma
		Urzage 𒌨𒍠𒌓𒁺			r. c. 2400 BC	Historicity certain; "King of Kish"; temp. of Il
Second dynasty of Uruk / Uruk II dynasty (c. 2500 – c. 2340 BC)
"Then Hamazi was defeated and the kingship was taken to Uruk." — SKL
2nd		Lugal-kinishe-dudu 𒈗𒆠𒉌𒂠𒌌𒌌			r. c. 2430, c. 2400 BC (120 years)	Historicity certain.; Held the title of, "King of Uruk and Ur".; temp. of Enentarzi
		Lugal-kisal-si 𒈗𒆦𒋛	Son of Lugal-kinishe-dudu		Uncertain; these three rulers may have fl. c. 2400 – c. 2350 BC sometime during the EDIIIb period.	Historicity certain.; Held the title of, "King of Uruk and Ur".; temp. of Lugalanda
		Urni 𒌨𒉌𒉌𒋾			Uncertain; these three rulers may have fl. c. 2400 – c. 2350 BC sometime during the EDIIIb period.	Historicity certain.; temp. of Elulu
		Lugalsilâsi II 𒈗𒋻𒋛			Uncertain; these three rulers may have fl. c. 2400 – c. 2350 BC sometime during the EDIIIb period.	Historicity certain.; temp. of Urukagina
3rd		Argandea 𒅈𒂵𒀭𒀀			r. c. 2350 BC (7 years)	Said on the SKL to have held the title of, "King" of not just Uruk; but, to have held the "Kingship" over all of Sumer; Known from the SKL; very little otherwise; Historicity uncertain
Proto-Imperial period (c. 2350 – c. 2254 BC)
1st		Enshakushanna 𒂗𒊮𒊨𒀭𒈾	Son of Elulu (?)		r. c. 2430, c. 2350 BC (2 to 60 years)	Historicity certain.; Held the title of "lord of Sumer and king of all the land".; temp. of Ur-Zababa
"3 kings; they ruled for 187 years. Then Uruk was defeated and the kingship was taken to Ur." — SKL
#	Depiction	Ruler	Succession	Epithet	Approx. dates	Notes
Third dynasty of Uruk / Uruk III dynasty (c. 2340 – c. 2254 BC)
"Then Kish was defeated and the kingship was taken to Uruk." — SKL
1st		Lugalzagesi 𒈗𒍠𒄀𒋛	Son of Ukush		r. c. 2340 – c. 2316 BC (25 to 34 years)	Historicity certain.; Held the title of "king of the land".; temp. of Sargom
"1 king; he ruled for 25 years. Then the reign of Uruk was abolished and the kingship was taken to Akkad." — SKL
		Girimesi 𒀀𒄩𒋻𒁺𒋛			Uncertain; this ruler may have fl. c. 2350 – c. 2254 BC sometime during the Proto-Imperial period.	Historicity certain.; temp. of Ikun-Ishar
#	Depiction	Ruler	Succession	Epithet	Approx. dates	Notes
Akkadian period (c. 2254 – c. 2154 BC)
Fourth dynasty of Uruk / Uruk IV dynasty (c. 2254 – c. 2124 BC)
		Amar-girid 𒀫𒀭𒄌𒆠			r. c. 2254 BC	Historicity certain; temp. of Naram-Suen; A ruler of Uruk who led a southern coalition of eight city-states during the Great Revolt against Naram-Suen
Gutian period (c. 2154 – c. 2119 BC)
"Then Akkad was defeated and the kingship was taken to Uruk." — SKL
1st		Ur-nigin 𒌨𒌋𒌓𒆤			r. c. 2154 – c. 2147 BC (7 years)	Said on the SKL to have held the title of, "King" of not just Uruk; but, to have held the "Kingship" over all of Sumer; May have served as a "governor" of Uruk under the Akkadian empire; Historicity uncertain
2nd		Ur-gigir 𒌨𒄑𒇀	Son of Ur-nigin		r. c. 2147 – c. 2141 BC (6 years)	Said on the SKL to have held the title of, "King" of not just Uruk; but, to have held the "Kingship" over all of Sumer; Known from the SKL; very little otherwise; Historicity uncertain
3rd		Kuda 𒋻𒁕			r. c. 2141 – c. 2135 BC (6 years)	Said on the SKL to have held the title of, "King" of not just Uruk; but, to have held the "Kingship" over all of Sumer; Known from the SKL; very little otherwise; Historicity uncertain
4th		Puzur-ili 𒅤𒊭𒉌𒉌			r. c. 2135 – c. 2130 BC (5 years)	Said on the SKL to have held the title of, "King" of not just Uruk; but, to have held the "Kingship" over all of Sumer; Known from the SKL; very little otherwise; Historicity uncertain
5th		Ur-Utu 𒌨𒀭𒌓	Son of Ur-gigir		r. c. 2130 – c. 2124 BC (6 years)	Said on the SKL to have held the title of, "King" of not just Uruk; but, to have held the "Kingship" over all of Sumer; Known from the SKL; very little otherwise; Historicity uncertain
"5 kings; they ruled for 30 years. Then the reign of Uruk was abolished and the kingship was taken to the land of Gutium." — SKL
#	Depiction	Ruler	Succession	Epithet	Approx. dates	Notes
Ur III period (c. 2119 – c. 2004 BC)
Fifth dynasty of Uruk / Uruk V dynasty (c. 2124 – c. 1872 BC)
"Then the army of Gutium was defeated and the kingship was taken to Uruk." — SKL
1st		Utu-hengal 𒀭𒌓𒃶𒅅			r. c. 2124 – c. 2113 BC (7 to 26 years)	A "governor" of Uruk who overthrew the Gutians and briefly ruled Sumer until he was succeeded by Ur-Nammu, who he had appointed governor of Ur, thus ending the final Sumerian dynasty of Uruk.; Said on the SKL to have held the title of, "King" of not just Uruk; but, to have held the "Kingship" over all of Sumer; Historicity certain
"1 king; he ruled for 7 years, 6 months, and 15 days. Then Uruk was defeated and the kingship was taken to Ur." — SKL
#	Depiction	Ruler	Succession	Epithet	Approx. dates	Notes
Isin-Larsa period (c. 2025 – c. 1763 BC)
Sixth dynasty of Uruk / Uruk VI dynasty (c. 1872 – c. 1802 BC)
		Sîn-kāšid 𒀭𒂗𒍪𒂵𒅆𒀉			r. c. 1865 – c. 1833 BC	Historicity certain; temp. of Sin-Iddinam
		Sin-iribam	Son of Sîn-kāšid		r. c. 1833 – c. 1827 BC	Son of Sîn-kāšid; Historicity certain; temp. of Sin-Eribam
		Sîn-gāmil	Son of Sin-eribam		r. c. 1827 – c. 1824 BC	Son of Sin-eribam; Historicity certain; temp. of Sin-Iqisham
		An-am 𒀭𒀀𒀭			r. c. 1824 – c. 1816 BC	Historicity certain; temp. of Silli-Adad
		Irdanene	Son of Anam		r. c. 1816 – c. 1810 BC	Historicity certain; temp. of Warad-Sin
		Rîm-Anum			r. c. 1810 – c. 1802 BC	Historicity certain; temp. of Rim-Sîn I
		Nabi-ilishu			r. c. 1802 BC	Historicity certain; temp. of Damiq-ilishu

== See also ==
- Ancient City Seals
- Blau Monuments
- Chronology of the ancient Near East
- Geography of Mesopotamia
- Historical urban community sizes
- Kullaba
- List of cities of the ancient Near East
- Warka Vase
