= Sîn-gāmil =

Sin-gamil

King of Uruk
- Reign: c. 1827 - c. 1824 BC
- Predecessor: Sin-iribam
- Died: c. 1824 BC
- Dynasty: 6th Dynasty of Uruk
- Father: Sin-iribam

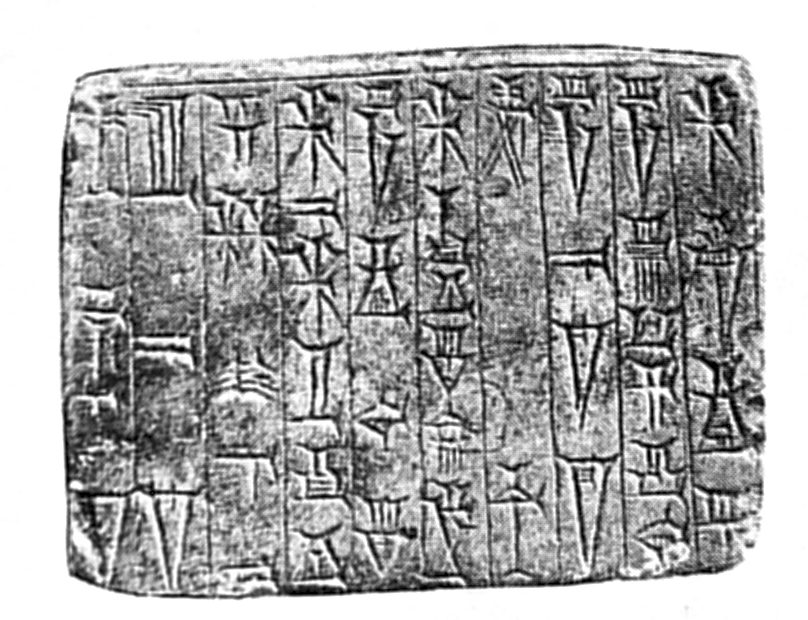
Dedication tablet of Sîn-gāmil, ruler of Uruk, 18th century BC. British Museum.

Sîn-gāmil (inscribed in Akkadian: 𒀭𒂗𒍪𒂵𒈪𒅋: ^{D}EN.ZU-kà-mi-il; died c. 1824 BC) was an Amorite king of Uruk, at the time of the Isin-Larsa period. He was the son of Sin-iribam. Ilum-gamil, his brother, may have succeeded him.

Sîn-gāmil is also known from one of this dedication tablets.

His son was Salim-palih-Marduk, and, according to their seals, their deities were Marduk and Shamash.

The dynasty of the Kings of Uruk in the early 2nd millennium BC was composed of the following rulers in approximate chronological order: Alila-hadum, Sumu-binasa, Naram-Sin, Sîn-kāšid, Sin-iribam, Sin-gamil, Ilum-gamil, An-am, Irdanene, Rîm-Anum, and Nabi-ilishu.

This ruler is not to be confused with the Sîn-gamil, son of Sin-semi, who ruled the city of Diniktum contemporary with Zimri-Lim of Mari.

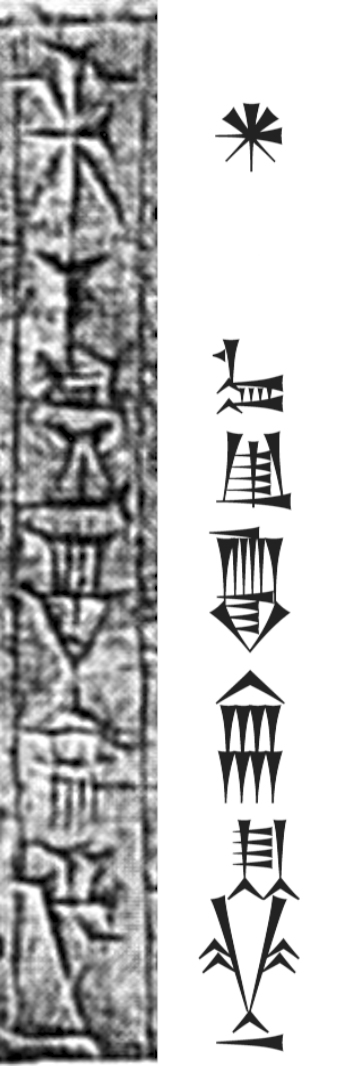
The name "Sîn-gāmil" on a dedication tablet, and in standard Sumero-Akkadian cuneiform

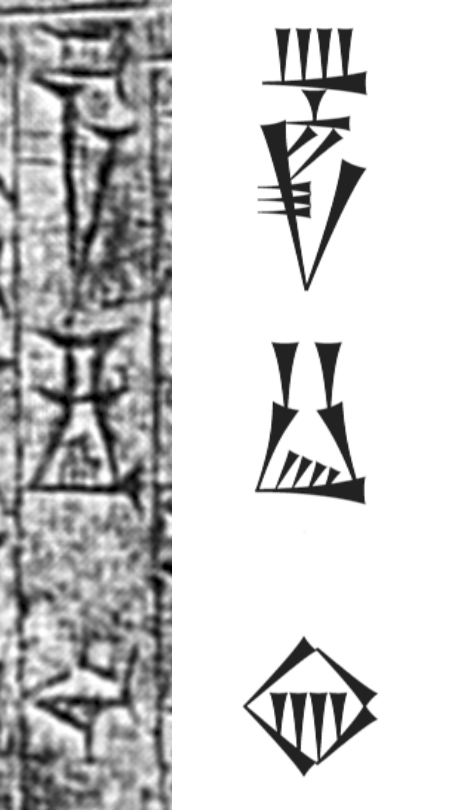
Inscription 𒈗𒀕𒆠, Lugal Unug^{ki}, "King of Uruk" on the tablet of Sîn-gāmil
