= An-am =

An-am 𒀭𒀀𒀭

King of Uruk
- Reign: c. 1824 - c. 1816 BC
- Successor: Irdanene
- Died: c. 1816 BC
- Issue: Irdanene
- Dynasty: 6th Dynasty of Uruk
- Father: Ilan-semea

An-am (AN-am_{3}) (also Dingiram or Anam; died c. 1816 BC) was a ruler of the Old Babylonian period city of Uruk. He took the titles of "Shepard of Uruk" and "Army Chief of Uruk". An-am is known to be the father of the succeeding ruler Irdanene from the latter's year name "... brought a statue in gold representing Dingiram his father into the temple of Nanaia". Unlike the rest of the dynasty, An-am and Irdanene had Sumerian names. A royal hymn to An-am was found at Uruk. He restored the temples of An and Inanna "the ancient work of divine Ur-Nammu and Sulgi".

From one inscription found at Uruk we know that he was the son of Ilān-šemeā and that he rebuilt the city wall of Uruk.

"Anam, army chief of Uruk, son of Ilān-šemeā, when the wall of Uruk, the old construction of Gilgameš, he restored, that the waters going around it might roar (without damaging it) with burnt bricks he built it for him (Gilgameš)"

Location of Uruk.

In another inscription he records building a temple for the goddess Kanisurra, called the "mistress of the Iturungal", with the Iturungal being a major canal in Sumer.

Several of An-am's year names are known:

- Year AN-am became king
- Year in which (Dingiram) made opposite the gate of the gipar / "nunnery" a pure (bed) and placed there (in the gate) a statue adorned with gold for An and Inanna
- Year (Dingiram made) 2 thrones (and) a statue of the king
- Year he restored the interior of the decaying temple of An and Inanna

In a letter to ruler of Babylon Sin-Muballit, An-am reminds him that they are both of "one house" ie. from the Yaminite tribe of Amnanum. Sîn-kāšid, the founder of the 6th Dynasty of Uruk, took as a title "King of the Amnanum (Tribe)" (lugal am-na-nu-um) as did the third ruler, Sîn-gāmil.

"... Ever since the kings of Uruk and Babylon are one house—except for the present moment when my heart and your heart were grieved—and, by what I have heard from the mouth of my father and my grandfather, whom I have known personally, ever since the time of Sin-kašid and since the time I witnessed myself until now, the army of Amnan-Yahrur (troops of Babylon) has indeed arrived here two or three times for military assistance to this house ..."

A few of the inscriptions of An-am are thought to have antedated his reign. In two inscriptions of An-am from the rule of Sîn-gāmil on the construction of a temple for the god Nergal in the city of Uṣarpara close with "Anam, archivist, son of Ilān-šemeā, built this temple". The location of Uṣarpara is unknown.

A millennium later an inscribed barrel cylinder of Babylonian ruler Marduk-apla-iddina II records rebuilding a "house of the god Ningishzida" in Uruk built by An-am.

== See also ==
- List of Mesopotamian dynasties
- Chronology of the ancient Near East
