= Julius Jordan =

German archaeologist (1877-1945)

Julius Johann Heinrich Jordan (27 October 1877 – 7 February 1945) was a German archaeologist active in Mesopotamia before and after the First World War.

In the 1930s he was the Director of the Baghdad Antiquities Museum.

== Early life ==
Born in Cassel in 1877, Jordan was educated at the Wilhelm-Gymnasium there, then in the spring of 1896 was admitted to the structural engineering department of the TU Dresden to study architecture. In Dresden he became a member of a group known as the Erato singers. His most important teacher was Cornelius Gurlitt, and Jordan also found a life-changing friendship with an older student, Walter Andrae. After graduating from this course around 1902, Jordan worked as a government construction manager in Chemnitz.

== Career ==
In 1904, with the help of Andrae, Jordan joined the German excavations at Assur, working there for eight years, and he also became a pupil of Robert Koldewey (1855–1925), who was working on the Hanging Gardens of Babylon. In 1910 Jordan received a doctorate, supervised by Cornelius Gurlitt in Dresden, with a dissertation entitled "Construction Elements of Assyrian Monumental Buildings" (Konstruktionselemente assyrischer Monumentalbauten).

Between 14 November 1912 and 12 May 1913, a German Oriental Society team led by Jordan, assisted by Conrad Preusser, began the first systematic excavations at Uruk. In that first season, he focused work on the two main temple complexes, known as the Eanna and the Rêś.

During the First World War, Jordan worked in an architectural office in Munich. He could not return to his archaeological interests in Mesopotamia, now Mandatory Iraq under British control, until 1926. From 1928 to 1931 he excavated again at Uruk, then from 1931 to 1939 worked for the museum service of the newly independent Kingdom of Iraq as director of the Baghdad Antiquities Museum. During the Second World War he was a consultant at the German Archaeological Institute and a visiting professor of architectural history at Technische Universität Berlin.

In her autobiography, Agatha Christie mentions meeting and getting to know Dr. Jordan and his wife during her time in Baghdad with her husband, the archaeologist Max Mallowan. She describes him as a gentle and considerate man and a good pianist. It was a shock to her to hear him say "You do not understand. Our Jews are perhaps different from yours. They are a danger. They should be exterminated. Nothing else will really do but that." She writes that this was her first encounter with a Nazi and later discovered that his wife was an even fiercer Nazi than he was.

Jordan died of a stomach ulcer in the Franziskus Hospital in Tiergarten in February 1945.

He was buried in the Stahnsdorf South-Western Cemetery.

== Selected publications ==
- Julius Jordan, Uruk-Warka (51. Wissenschaftliche Veröffentlichung der Deutschen Orient-Gesellschaft, 1928)
- Julius Jordan, "Vorläufiger Bericht über die von der Notgemeinschaft der Deutschen Wissenschaft in Uruk-Warka unternommenen Ausgrabungen" in Abhandlungen der Preußischen Akademie der Wissenschaften, 1929, 1930, and 1931
- Julius Jordan, Die Ausgrabungen der Notgemeinschaft der Deutschen Wissenschaft in Uruk-Warka 1930/1931 (1933)
- Julius Jordan, A Guide through the Ruins of Babylon and Borsippa (Baghdad, 1937)
- Julius Jordan, Der nahe Osten (Stuttgart, 1942)
- Julius Jordan, Leistungen und Aufgaben der deutschen Ausgrabungen im Vorderen Orient (Leipzig: Harrassowitz, 1944)
