= Lugalsilâsi I =

Ancient Sumerian ruler

Lugalsilâsi I 𒈗𒋻𒋛

King of Kish
- Reign: c. 2455 - c. 2445 BC
- Predecessor: Possibly Lugalnamniršumma
- Successor: Possibly Meskalamdug

King of Uruk
- Reign: c. 2455 - c. 2445 BC
- Predecessor: Possibly Lugalnamniršumma
- Successor: Possibly Meskalamdug
- Born: Uruk
- Died: c. 2445 BC
- Dynasty: Second dynasty of Uruk
- Religion: Sumerian religion

Lugalsilâsi I (Note: Sumerian: 𒈗𒋻𒋛, romanized: lugalsilâsi; transliterated: lugal.silâ.si; lit. 'The Lord Fills the Streets (of the City)') (died c. 2445 BC) was a Sumerian ruler. He ruled sometime during the Early Dynastic IIIb period (c. 2500 – c. 2350 BCE); additionally, temp. Eannatum, Akurgal, Ush, E-iginimpa'e, and Ikun-Mari. Lugalsilâsi I was preceded by Lugalnamniršumma as the king of Uruk. Lugalsilâsi I may have also been succeeded by Meskalamdug as a great king of Kish.
