= Lugalnamniršumma =

Ancient Sumerian ruler

Lugalnamniršumma 𒈗𒉆𒉪𒋧

King of Kish
- Reign: c. 2494 - c. 2455 BC
- Predecessor: Possibly Enmebaragesi
- Successor: Possibly Lugalsilâsi I

King of Uruk
- Reign: c. 2494 - c. 2455 BC
- Predecessor: Possibly Ursangpae
- Successor: Possibly Lugalsilâsi I

King of Lagash
- Reign: c. 2494 - c. 2465 BC
- Predecessor: Possibly Urnanshe
- Successor: Possibly Akurgal
- Born: Uruk
- Died: c. 2455 BC
- Dynasty: 2nd dynasty of Uruk
- Religion: Sumerian religion

Lugalnamniršumma (Note: Sumerian: 𒈗𒉆𒉪𒋧, romanized: lugalnamniršumma; transliterated: lugal.nam.nir.šum₂) (died c. 2455 BC) was a Sumerian ruler. He ruled sometime during the Early Dynastic IIIb period (c. 2500 – c. 2350 BCE); additionally, temp. Akalamdug, Ur-Nanshe, Akurgal, Paraganedu, and Ennail. Ursangpae may have preceded Lugalnamniršumma as a king of Uruk. Lugalnamniršumma may have also been succeeded by Lugalsilâsi I as a great king of Kish.
