= Irdanene =

- King of Uruk
- Reign: 18th century BC
- Predecessor: An-am
- Successor: Rîm-Anum
- House: 6th Dynasty of Uruk

Location of Uruk.

Irdanene (IR_{3}-ne-ne) (also Urdunene or IRene) was a ruler of Old Babylonian period Uruk and son of his predecessor, An-am. He is thought to have been a contemporary of Rim-Sîn I (c. 1822–1763 BC), ruler of the city of Larsa based on his 14th year name which records the defeat of Uruk, and the name of Irdanene (considered as an uncertain reading) i.e. "Year the armies of Uruk, Isin, Babylon, Sutum, Rapiqum, and of Irdanene the king of Uruk were smitten with weapons". Rim-Sin I also dealt with this in three known inscriptions. One, on a clay cone, read "... when he smote with weapons the army of Uruk, Isin, Babylon, Rapiqum, and Sutium, captured iR-ne-ne, king of Uruk, in that battle, (and) laid his foot on his head as if he were a snake ...".

While no inscriptions of Irdanene have yet been found, three of his servant's sealing have been found "I-ni-e-[...], son of Piqqum, servant of IR-ne-ne." on four tablets at Uruk, "Iddin-Na[naia], son of Sin-iri[bam], servant of IR-ne-ne." on one tablet envelope from Uruk, "Nabi-ihsu, son of Sin-kasid, servant of IR-ne-ne." on a tablet from Uruk.

Several year names of Irdanene are known (one found on a document from the city of Kisurra):

- Year Irdanene (became) king
- Year I (Irdanene) brought a statue in gold representing Dingiram his father into the temple of Nanaia
- Year I (Irdanene) set free for Enlil in Nippur for ever (from the forced labour) the sons and daughters of Nippur (held) in Uruk, as many as they are
- Year (Irdanene) brought for An and Inanna in their temple a magnificent (procession) chariot adorned with gold, precious stones and pearls from Meluhha
- Year (Irdanene) placed 2 copper statues of Irdanene the king at the gate of the gipar / "nunnery" and 2 copper statues for the goddess Naszpartum right and left of the muszaigigala-gate

Naspartu(m) is a goddess associated with the E-anna temple of Uruk and the goddess Inanna referred to is Inanna of Kitium. The god Mus-a-igigal, also associated with the E-anna temple is known to have been worshiped there.

== See also ==
- List of Mesopotamian dynasties
- Chronology of the ancient Near East
- Rapiqum
