= Walter Andrae =

German archeologist and architect (1875–1956)

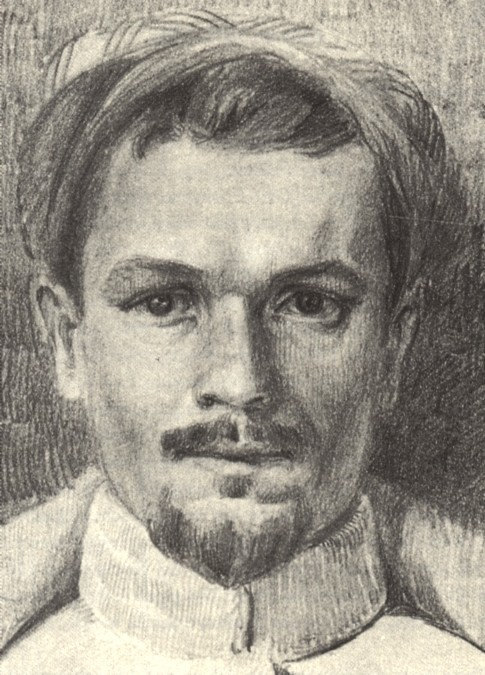
Walter Andrae.

Walter Andrae (February 18, 1875 – July 28, 1956) was a German archaeologist and architect born near Leipzig.

== Career ==
=== Archaeologist ===
Andrae initially studied architecture at the Dresden University of Technology, where he befriended a younger student, Julius Jordan, with a life-changing effect on him.

In 1898, Andrae participated in an archaeological dig at Babylon under the leadership of Robert Koldewey (1855–1925). He played an influential role in the smuggling of the Ishtar Gate out of the country. From 1903 to 1914, he directed the excavation of the ancient Assyrian capital of Assur. During this time period, he also performed archaeological excavations at Hatra and Shuruppak. Another significant archaeological site that he was involved in was the Hittite city of Sam'al.

=== Museum curator and director ===
In 1921 Andrae became curator of the Vorderasiatisches Museum Berlin, where from 1928 to 1951 he served as its director. Starting in 1923, he taught classes in architectural history at Technische Universität Berlin.

== Published works ==
Among his better known writings were Der wiedererstandene Assur, and the autobiographical Lebenserinnerungen eines Ausgräbers (Memoirs of an excavator). Other publications by Andrae include:

- Der Anu-Adad-Tempel in Assur 1909
- Die Festungswerke von Assur 1913
- Die Stelenreihen in Assur 1913
- Die archaischen Ischtar-Tempel in Assur 1922
- Farbige Keramik aus Assur und ihre Vorstufen in altassyrischen Wandmalereien 1923
- Die Kunst des Alten Orients 1925
- Kultrelief an dem Brunnen des Assurtempels zu Assur 1931
- Die Partherstadt Assur (with Heinz Lenzen) 1933
- Die ionische Säule. Bauform oder Symbol? 1933
- Alte Feststraßen im Nahen Osten 1941
