= Descent of Inanna into the Underworld =

Sumerian myth

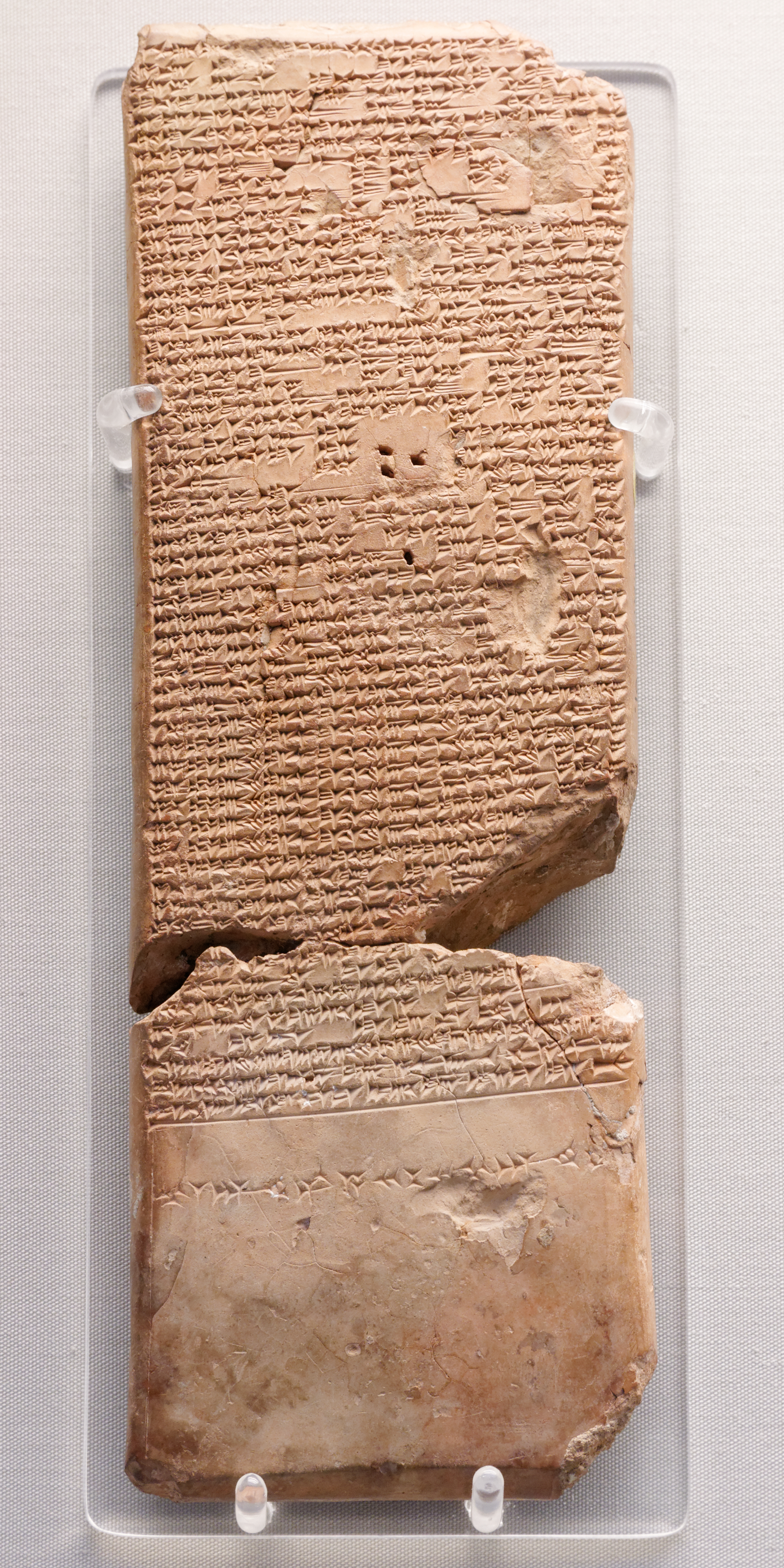
Copy of the Akkadian version of Ishtar's Descent into Hell, from the " Library of Ashurbanipal ' in Nineveh, 7th century BC, British Museum, UK.

The Descent of Inanna into the Underworld (or, in its Akkadian version, Descent of Ishtar into the Underworld) or Angalta ("From the Great Sky") is a Sumerian myth that narrates the descent of the goddess Inanna into the Underworld to overthrow its ruler, Ereshkigal. Following the removal of her adornments, she perishes. Enki intervenes indirectly, restoring Inanna to life. Inanna is required to deliver another living being in exchange for her freedom. She selects Dumuzi, who is transported to the Underworld. Responding to the pleas of Geshtinanna, Dumuzi is permitted to remain in the Underworld for only a portion of the year, with his sister assuming his role for the remaining duration.

The myth exists in two main versions: one in Sumerian and the other in Akkadian. The Akkadian version was first discovered and translated in the 1860s. The existence of the longer and older Sumerian version was first established in the early 20th century, but it required approximately fifty years for epigraphists to fully reconstruct and translate it.

The story of Descent of Inanna into the Underworld offers insights into Mesopotamian culture through its numerous characters and developed plot. The influence of this culture on subsequent civilizations is evident in the traces of Mesopotamian elements found in Greece, Phoenicia, and the Old Testament. In the 20th century, the story was used by some psychoanalysis theorists to illustrate psychic mechanisms.

== Epigraphic reconstruction ==
The myth of Descent of Inanna into the Underworld is presented in two versions: one written in Sumerian and another rewritten in Akkadian, where the goddess is referred to as Ishtar. These two versions are not faithful translations of each other; instead, they represent two distinct renditions.

The Akkadian version of the myth, comprising 138 lines and entitled The Descent of Ishtar into the Underworld, was the initial version to be unearthed. Among the numerous clay tablet fragments unearthed in Nineveh and Assur during the 1860s, two comprehensive texts dating from the early first millennium BCE particularly stand out. However, their provenance appears to originate from as early as 1600 BCE. Except for a few minor displacements and stylistic divergences, the two texts are strikingly similar and can be used to reconstruct the plot. The translation of these fragments was among the first Akkadian literary works to be published in a modern language.

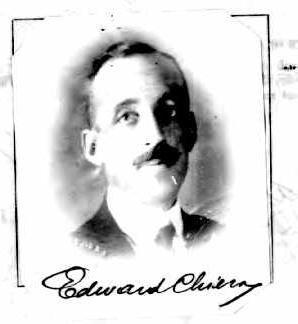
Archaeologist Edward Chiera (1924), who found the second piece of the Istanbul tablet at the University museum in Philadelphia.

The Sumerian version, entitled Descent of Inanna into the Underworld, comprises 400 lines and is the modern designation for the myth. The incipit, which designates the Sumerian text, bestows upon it the title Angalta, which translates to "From the Great Sky." This version, discovered after the Akkadian version, is of a more archaic provenance. It was composed circa 1700 BCE, although the precise date of its origin remains uncertain. In the early 20th century, epigraphists painstakingly pieced together the text from numerous tablet fragments unearthed in Nippur. Arno Poebel and Stephen Langdon initiated the initial reconstruction efforts with small text fragments and the upper half of a four-column tablet preserved in the Istanbul Archaeological Museum. However, due to the absence of numerous elements, it was not feasible to establish a logical reconstruction of the narrative. Consequently, archaeologist Edward Chiera identified the second portion of the Istanbul tablet at the University museum in Philadelphia, and a preliminary complete translation was published in 1936.

But for historian Samuel Noah Kramer the narrative remained incomplete. A considerable number of passages in the Akkadian version appeared to be too allusive to be linked to the Sumerian version. Furthermore, some fragments were challenging to situate within the appropriate sequence. Consequently, Kramer proceeded to collate the disparate fragments in his possession, which were located between Istanbul and Philadelphia. The discovery in 1942 of a 94-line tablet at Yale University prompted a fundamental shift in the narrative structure. Contrary to the prevailing view among researchers at the time, which was influenced by the myth of Orpheus and the initial translations of Descent of Ishtar, Inanna did not descend to the Underworld to search for Dumuzi. Instead, her purpose was to extend her power. Accordingly, her descent precedes that of her husband. In addition to the association with the Orpheus myth, this misunderstanding can also be attributed to the intricate complexity of the Akkadian version's conclusion. The final twelve lines, which pertain to Dumuzi, continue to present interpretive challenges in the present era (2021). Consequently, the Sumerian version of the myth, of which only approximately twenty lines were absent by 1951, was ultimately nearly fully comprehended and published in the 1950s. Other reconstruction efforts, notably illuminated by the discovery of a 74-line tablet in the ancient city of Ur, translated in 1963, continued to produce a more complete English version in 1974 by William R. Sladek and a French one in 1980 by Jean Bottéro.

In 1996 Bendt Alster conducted a reexamination of a passage from the conclusion of Descent of Inanna into the Underworld, which led him to the unexpected conclusion that Inanna herself intercedes on behalf of Dumuzi, whom she had previously sent to the Underworld in a cruel act, to secure his seasonal return to life. New French and English translations were produced by Pascal Attinger in 2016 (with subsequent revisions in 2021) and by Bénédicte Cuperly in 2021, who also provided new insights into the narrative.

== Characters ==
=== Inanna/Ishtar ===
Inanna (also known as Ishtar in Akkadian) is a prominent deity in the Mesopotamian pantheon, identified as the "Lady of Heaven" in Sumerian texts. Inanna is the daughter of Sîn (Nanna in Sumerian), the moon god, and his wife Nikkal. Her siblings include the sun god Shamash (Utu in Sumerian) and Ereshkigal, her older sister. Inanna is a goddess with a multifaceted nature. She is the goddess of love, fertility, war, grain, and prosperity. She is also associated with prostitution and other taboo practices such as sex change, deformity, and disguises. Her domain is so vast that she seems to embody the characteristics of several goddesses that appeared and disappeared throughout Mesopotamian history. Additionally, she is the goddess who elevates kings and unites with them in a sacred marriage to ensure their prosperity.

Inanna is depicted as a conquering and vindictive goddess in the context of the mythological narrative of Descent of Inanna into the Underworld and other related stories such as Inanna and Bilulu. As a principle of movement and dynamism, she appears to represent an intermediate character between life and death. She traverses the celestial and terrestrial realms, exemplified by her capacity to unlock the portals of the Underworld and her proclivity to unleash the dead upon the living. To Enlil, Nanna, or Enki, she manifests as an impetuous and reckless deity. Enki is not averse to remarking upon the incongruity of the goddess's eccentricity, fantasy, or lunacy.

Additionally, Inanna is a goddess who has no husband but is associated with numerous lovers. These lovers, in contact with her, transform and subsequently perish. This is corroborated by the passage from the Epic of Gilgamesh where Gilgamesh refuses to be seduced by Ishtar (referred to as "princess" in the narrative). He safeguards himself against her affections and censures her for having caused only misery to her lovers, whose list he then enumerates, commencing with Tammuz.

Not one of your lovers,

Not one of your favorites,

Who escaped your traps!

Come now, let me tell you

The sad fate of your lovers!

[...]

Tammuz, the darling of your youth,

You assigned him

An annual lamentation!

— The Epic of Gilgamesh (Ninivite version)

In his analysis of Inanna/Ishtar in Descent of Inanna into the Underworld, Jean Bottéro posits that the goddess is depicted not as a deity associated with fertility or abundance, but rather as a lover and guardian of free love. She is portrayed as a figure whose passionate attachment knows no bounds. This is exemplified by the Akkadian version of the episode in which the goddess's demise results in the termination of all physical love and coupling activities. Although coupling is a prerequisite for fertility and reproduction, Ishtar's function does not fall within the scope of this fertility framework. Instead, her role is confined to the realms of physical attraction, sexuality, and desire.

=== Ereshkigal ===
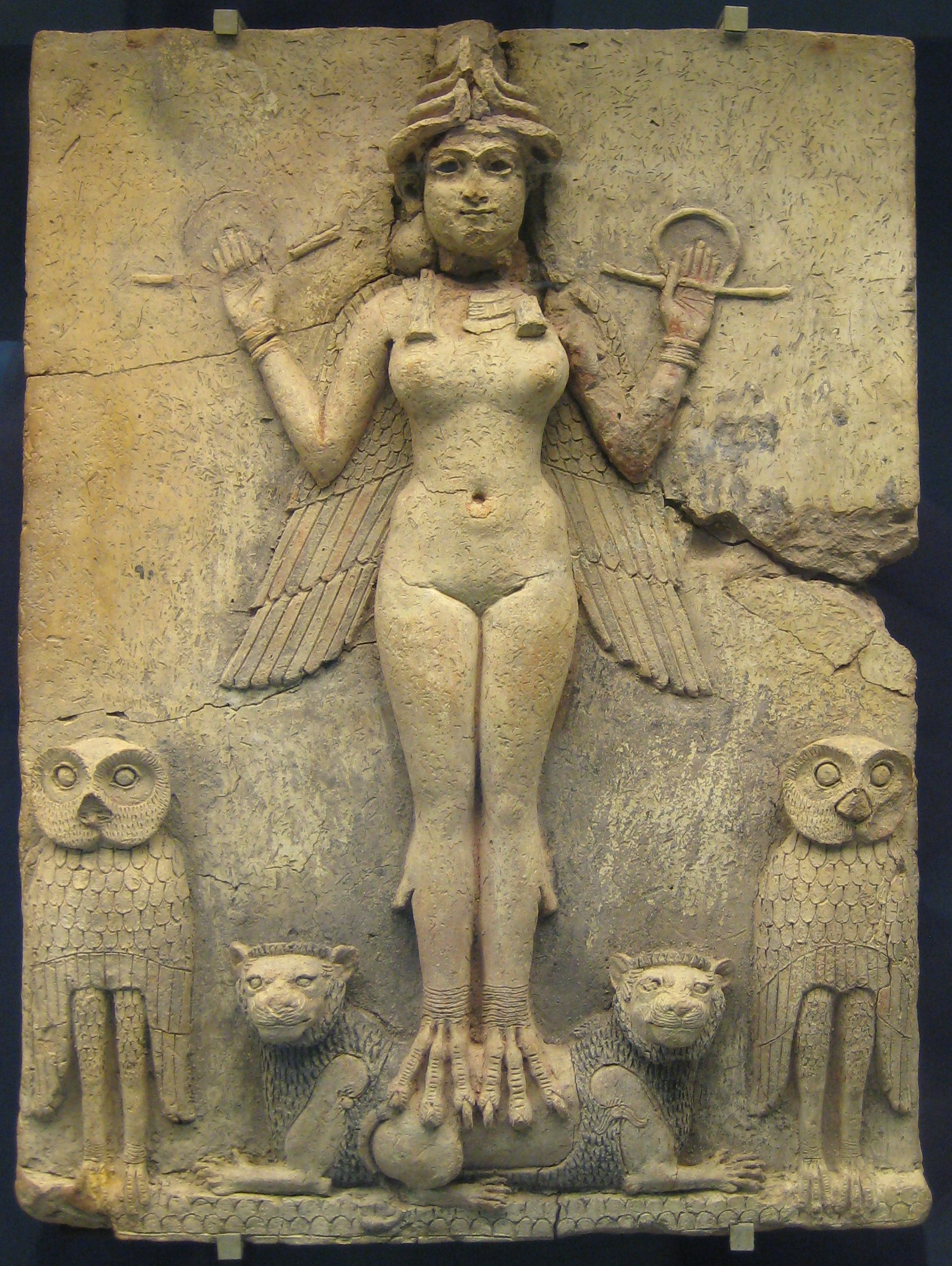
The Burney Plaque, also known as Queen of the Night, most probably represents the goddess Ereshkigal. British Museum, London.

In contrast to her younger sister Inanna, Ereshkigal is depicted as a more static figure, known as the "Queen of the Underworld" or the "Queen of the Dead." Inanna's sister, Ereshkigal, represents death, yet in contrast to her, she gives birth to children: young people who die prematurely on Earth, which causes the anguish she experiences in Descent of Inanna into the Underworld. However, according to Francis Joannes, this affliction can be attributed to the sorrow and sadness experienced by these humans who are cut off before they can experience the most fulfilling moments of their existence. She rules from a "lapis-lazuli palace", with the assistance of her vizier Namtar and the scribe of the Underworld, Geshtinanna, Dumuzi's sister and wife of Ningishzida. She is also accompanied by the seven Anunnakil, the judges of the Underworld, who, in Descent of Inanna into the Underworld, condemn Inanna to find a substitute to replace her in the Underworld.

==== Gugalanna ====
The Akkadian myth of Nergal and Ereshkigal portrays Ereshkigal as the wife of the god Nergal. But in Descent of Inanna into the Underworld, Gugalanna is attributed to her as a husband. His name likely signifies "Inspector of An's Canals" and may represent an alternative designation for Ennugi.

The name Gugalanna may also be interpreted as the "Bull of Heaven." Inanna requests entry into the Underworld on the pretext of sharing the mourning of Gugalanna with her sister. It appears that Ereshkigal's negative response to Inanna's arrival is related to what she may perceive as a pretext on the part of her sister. The overt display of grief for the demise of the renowned Bull of Heaven could be interpreted as somewhat inconsiderate or audacious on Inanna's part, particularly if this Bull of Heaven is the same entity whose premature death occurs in his confrontation with Gilgamesh, indirectly due to Ishtar.

=== Namtar ===
In the Akkadian version Ereshkigal is assisted by her vizier, Namtar. He is regarded as the deity responsible for diseases and epidemics. It is he who is charged with unleashing the "Sixty Diseases" upon Ishtar, resulting in her inevitable demise. Nevertheless, he is also credited with pouring the water from the "Waterskin" to resurrect Ishtar. Some hypothesize that he is also a progeny of Ereshkigal, the firstborn child of the goddess following her premature demise on Earth.

=== Enki ===
In the Sumerian pantheon, Enki (also known as Ea in Akkadian) is the god of subterranean freshwater, specifically the Apsû. According to myth, Enki's life began in the waters of Apsû even before humans existed. His wife, Ninhursag, his mother, Nammu, and various subordinate creatures also inhabited this realm. The Eabsû (house of the Apsû) was Enki's primary sanctuary.

He is the patron of the arts and techniques and may be considered the civilizing god and organizer of the world. He is the sovereign of the "Me" principle, which he maintains within his city of Eridu. In the myth of Inanna and Enki, Inanna appropriates a portion of these from him. Additionally, he is the creator and guardian of humanity. He forewarns them of the impending Flood and enables them to safeguard themselves without betraying the assembly of gods. He guides humans through the apkallu and Adapa. He is ingenious and intelligent and thus becomes indispensable to the other gods by solving the most challenging problems. For example, in the Epic of Creation, he saves the young gods from the wrath of the Apsû by resurrecting the dead Inanna in the Underworld. Similarly, in the myth of Nergal and Ereshkigal, he helps Nergal repair the affront he committed against Ereshkigal. These actions demonstrate Enki's role as a protector of humans, whereas traditional narratives portray the other deities as the originators of human suffering.

=== The galatura and the kurgara ===
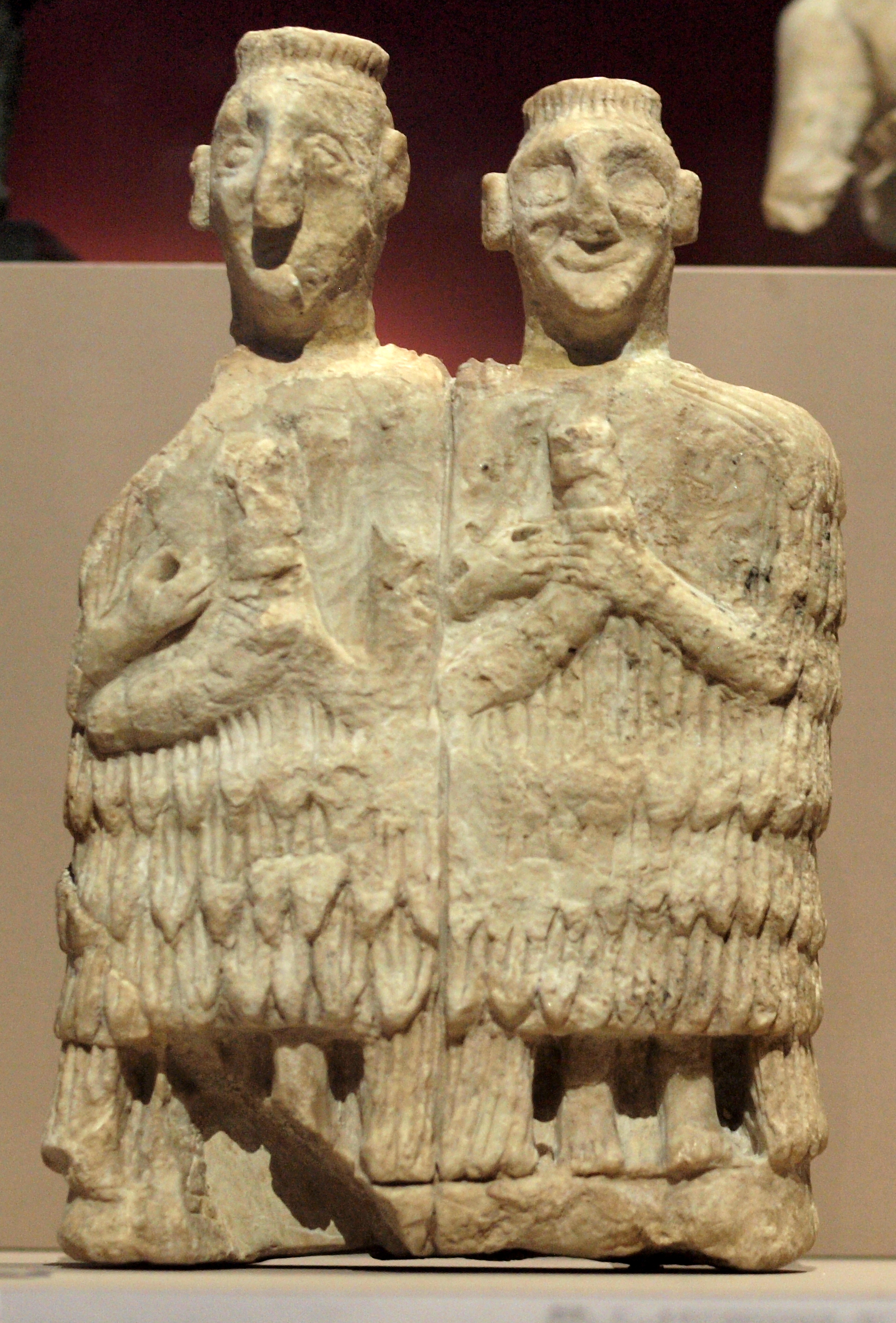
"Couple of musicians". Alabaster statuette, discovered at Mari, in the priests' chamber of the Temple of Inanna. Mid 3rd millennium B.C. Musée du Louvre, Paris.

The galatura (chief lamenter) and the kurgara (assinum in Akkadian or "singer") are beings with an unclear gender, similar to the Akkadian "su-su-namir", which translates to "His appearance is dazzling", and refers to an assinum who acts alone. These beings occupy a liminal space between the feminine and masculine, and as a result, they are not entirely considered humans. This allows them to enter and exit the Underworld without danger and even be invited into the Queen of the Underworld's bedroom to sympathize with her pain or entertain her. This is similar to the role Enki plays in the myth Enki et Ninmah, where he finds a useful role in Sumerian society for all the deformed men and women created by Ninmah.

A connection is established between the characters of the galatura and the kurgara and the members of Inanna's clergy. While there is currently no indication of whether they underwent any physical castration, it seems that effeminate men served as officiants in Inanna's temples. With different clothing and social, and sexual customs, they are considered by the population to have magical powers, inspiring respect and often fear.

The fact that Enki creates them from the dirt of his nails or that, in the Akkadian version, su-su-namir the assinum is cursed by Ereshkigal to be forever ostracized for deceiving the goddess of the Underworld suggests the infamy of their status. But historian Julia Assante emphasizes that the function of "kurgara" is defined by a precise social status. These individuals have only the goddess as family and sometimes bear their function as a surname. Their funerals and the maintenance of their graves (for a comfortable life in the Land of No Return) are ensured by the clergy and the royal family. Additionally, as officiants of the goddess of war, they also have the ear of kings as political and military advisors. Additionally, Assante notes that in the Descent of Inanna into the Underworld, the galatura and the kurgara are also referred to as "divine" by Ereshkigal. She quotes the goddess as saying, "Divine ones, I will give you a favorable greeting", which suggests that being made from Enki's nail dirt does not imply any social degradation. Indeed, the audience may perceive them as true heroes capable of resurrecting the goddess Inanna.

=== Dumuzi ===
Dumuzi (or Tammuz in Babylonian) is a deity associated with abundance in Sumerian mythology. He is thought to have emerged from a process of syncretism, likely occurring in prehistoric times, which involved the combination of several Sumerian deities related to vegetation or livestock.

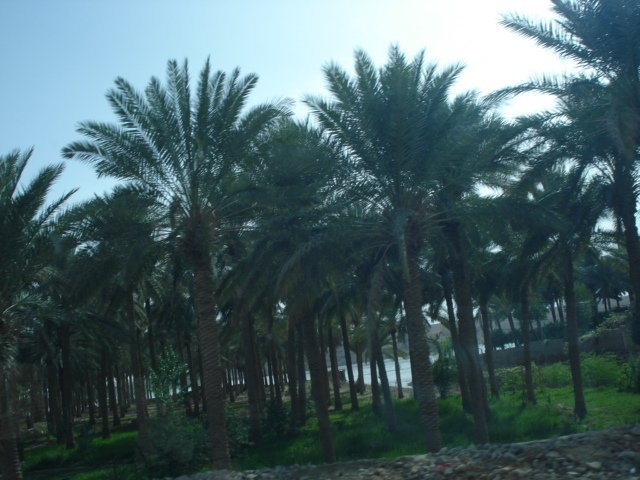
Date palms near the Euphrates River in the Baghdad region (Iraq).

Dumuzi represents the cyclical nature of the seasons through his death and subsequent rebirth. His union with Inanna appears to originate from a ritual associated with the harvesting of dates, wherein the goddess, who protects granaries and silos, attracts and welcomes Dumuzi, a date palm producer. This union, therefore, generates prosperity and abundance for the community.

Dumuzi's death is a symbol of the advent of the scorching summer, drought, and food scarcity, inspiring a plethora of lamentation texts. Consequently, Dumuzi spends part of the year in the Underworld during the dry season and the other part on Earth for the cultivation and harvest period, linking his character to the agricultural calendar or livestock activities.

Additionally, he is referred to as "Dumuzi the shepherd", as the fifth legendary monarch preceding the Flood. He probably rules the city of Bad-tibira because the cult of the god Dumuzi is held there. From the Third Dynasty of Ur, kings who already engage in ritual union with Inanna appear to fully identify with "Dumuzi the shepherd" as shepherds of the people. It can thus be postulated that the "great Apple Tree of the lowland of Kulaba", as referenced in the Descent of Inanna to the Underworld, may be the throne of Uruk upon which a king named "Dumuzi the fisherman" sits. This would make him the fourth king of the first dynasty of Uruk-Kulaba, a period that commenced long after the legendary flood.

=== Geshtinanna ===
In the mythological tradition, Geshtinanna is identified as the sister of Dumuzi. She is a dream interpreter and the scribe of the Underworld, as well as the queen of vines. She is frequently depicted as a paragon of fidelity and loyalty, exhibiting a degree of self-sacrifice that approaches totality. In the version of the Descent of Inanna into the Underworld discovered in Ur, she endures a multitude of torments without divulging any information that would compromise her brother's safety.

In the Sumerian version she offers herself as a substitute for her brother's death. Every half-year, the exchange of the two characters continues between the world of the living and the realm of the dead. As a result, both Geshtinanna and her brother Dumuzi are incorporated into the eternal cycle of seasons. However, the Akkadian version of the myth is somewhat vague on this subject. Geshtinanna mourns her brother's death, but he rises thanks to the lamentation rites described in the last lines of the poem, with no clear indication that his sister will replace him in the Underworld. This ending passage led the first exegetes of the Descent of Inanna into the Underworld to mistakenly conclude that Inanna went to rescue Dumuzi from the Underworld.

== Mythological narratives ==
From the 3rd millennium BCE to the 1st millennium BCE, the Descent of Inanna into the Underworld, probably authored by Inanna's clergy, was read and recited in Sumerian and Akkadian in the most prominent cities of Mesopotamia, representing a significant aspect of Sumerian–Akkadian culture.

=== Sumerian version ===
Inanna, a goddess, and queen of Heaven, decides to descend to the Underworld, the "Land of No Return", where her sister and sworn enemy Ereshkigal resides. The text does not explicitly state her motivation, but the reactions of the gods Enlil and Nanna (a few lines later) suggest that it may have been a spontaneous decision, potentially driven by the intention to extend her influence to her sister's domain. Regardless of her true motivation, she proceeds to traverse the seven sanctuaries under her control and equips herself with the seven "Me", (Note: The concept of the "Me" is a uniquely Sumerian one. The "Me" is a set of capabilities, strengths, or powers that characterize the gods. They have no forms or outlines and integrate into reality through objects, laws, or even rituals. It is believed that they preside over the fate of humans and constitute the great forces that govern the cosmos, held by the gods.) of which she is the custodian.

She equipped herself with the Seven Powers,

After gathering them and holding them in her hand And taking them all, in full, to depart! She donned the Turban, Crown-of-the-steppe; Fixed the Heart-catchers on her forehead; Grabbed the Lazulite Module; Adjusted the Lazulite Necklace around her neck; Elegantly arranged the Coupled Pearls on her throat; Put on the Gold Bracelets on her hands; Spread the "Man! Come! Come!" Breastplate on her chest; Wrapped her body in the pala, Royal Mantle,

And painted her eyes with the "Come! Come!" makeup.

— Descent of Inanna into the Underworld – 17th century BCE

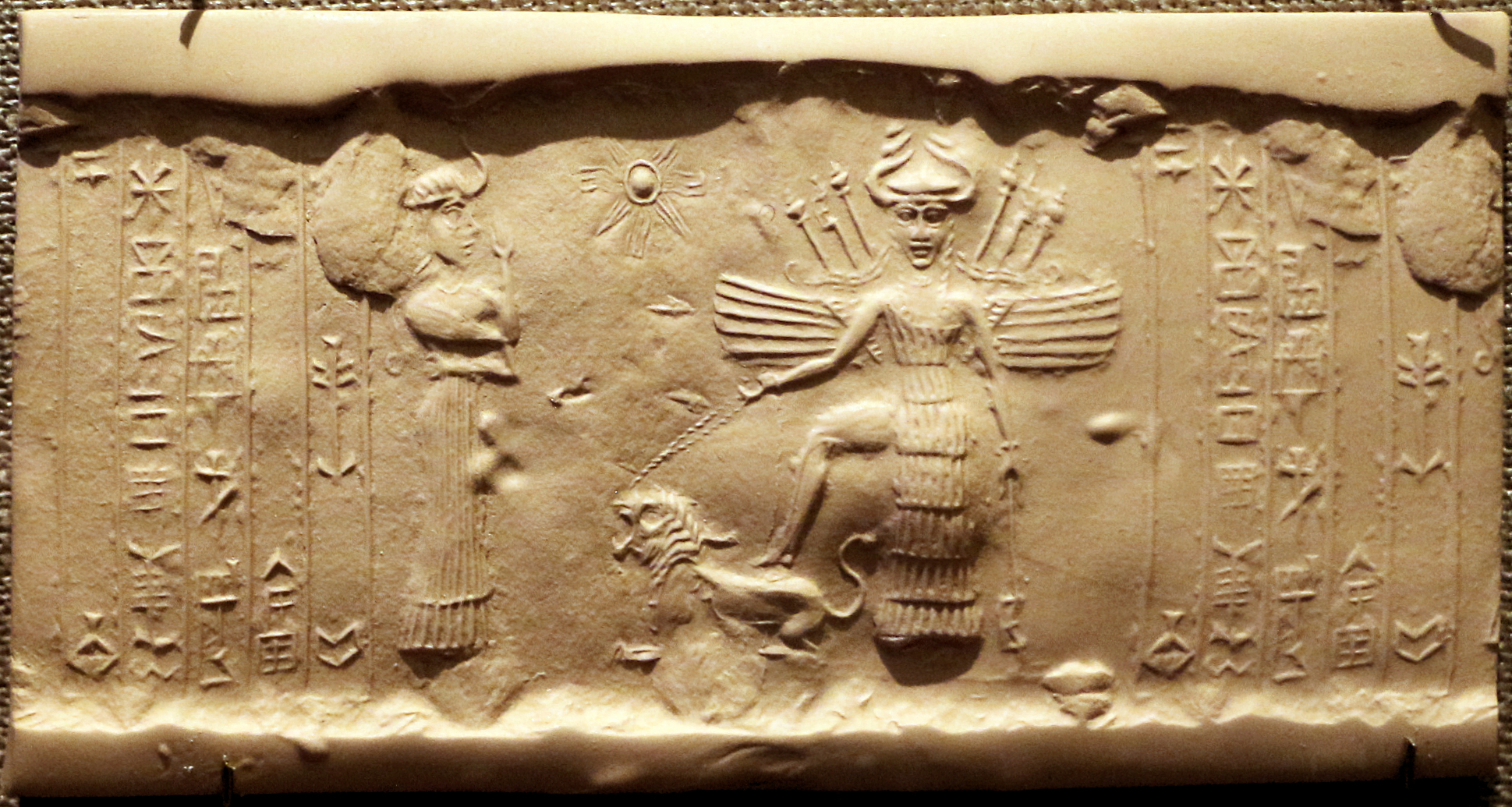
Modern impression of a cylinder depicting the goddess Inanna and her assistant Ninshubur, late 3rd millennium BC, Oriental Institute of Chicago.

Before her departure, Inanna issues a cautionary directive to her assistant, Ninshubur. (Note: The character of Ninshubur is sometimes identified as a masculine vizier of Inanna, and at other times as a feminine assistant of the goddess.)As she proceeds toward the portal of the Underworld, the goddess provides her with directives. Ninshubur is first charged with the duty of performing lamentation rites for Inanna. If the goddess does not return after three days and three nights, the assistant is to alert the other gods. She must first approach Enlil, then, if he offers no assistance, Nanna, and finally, as a last resort, Enki. During this journey, Ninshubur is instructed to impress the gods with her mourning and sinister demeanor due to Inanna's absence.

The holy Inanna then said to Ninshubur:

"Come here! My faithful assistant of the Éanna, My assistant with wise words, My messenger with effective speeches: Here I am going to the world Below! When I have arrived there, Raise a lamentation of catastrophe in my favor: Beat the drum at the Assembly seat; Visit the residences of the gods one by one: Tear your eyes; tear your mouth, Tear your provocative (?) hip (?)

And, like a pauper, wear only a strip of cloth!

— Descent of Inanna into the Underworld – 17th century BCE

Once these precautions have been taken, the goddess proceeds to the Underworld. Upon reaching the palace of Ganzer, Inanna makes a threatening gesture as she knocks on the door of the Underworld. (Note: The etymology of the term "Palace of Ganzer" remains uncertain. It has been postulated that this structure may be associated with the "Arallû," which translates to "Great Below," or the Sumerian term "Iri-Gal," which translates to "Great City.") To gain entry, she feigns the intention to mourn with Ereshkigal, whose husband, Lord Gugalanna, has been killed. (Note: Gugalana, or the "Bull of Heaven," is the first husband of Ereshkigal.) However, the latter is not deceived. Forewarned by her porter, she feigns acceptance and permits Inanna to enter her domain. The goddess is accompanied by the porter as she must pass through seven gates. At each rite of passage, the goddess is required to remove a piece of jewelry or clothing. Inanna then presents herself before Ereshkigal in a state of undress. Ereshkigal calls upon the Anunna, the Seven Judges of the Underworld, who condemn Inanna to remain in the Underworld. Ereshkigal then imposes upon her the condition of "remaining dead" and kills her. She subsequently hangs the goddess's corpse, which may also be translated as a "carcass" from a slaughter intended for cooking, on a peg.

She [Ereshkigal] cast a glance at Inanna: a deadly glance!

She spoke against her a word; a furious word! She shouted against her a cry: a cry of damnation! The Woman, thus mistreated, was turned into a corpse,

And the corpse was hung on a peg!

— Descent of Inanna into the Underworld – 17th century BCE

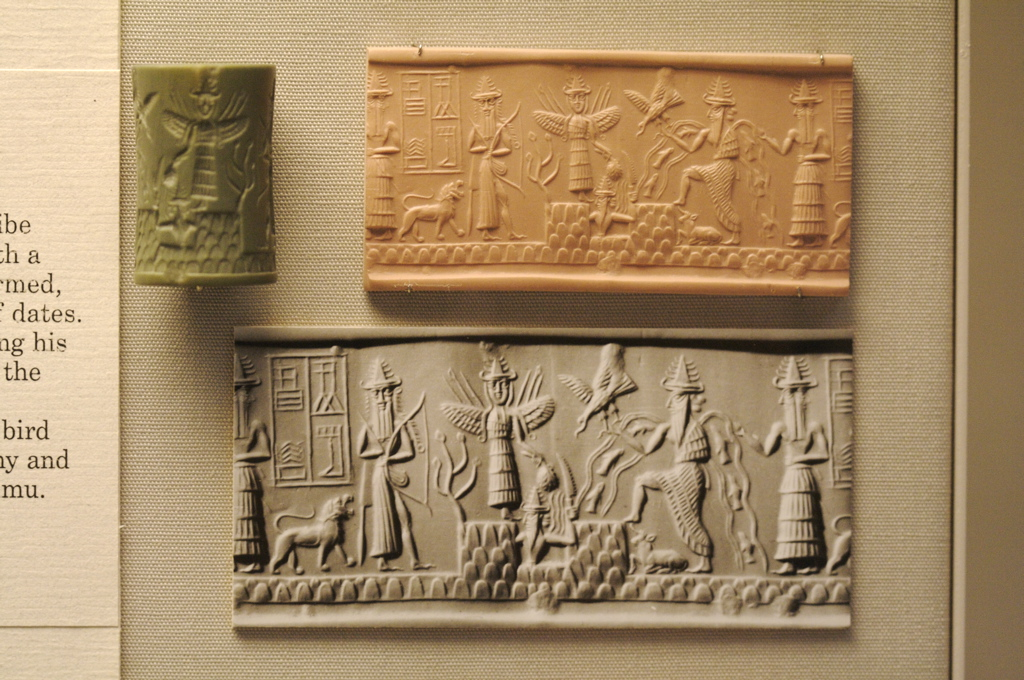
Akkad-period cylinder seal and its modern impression depicting the god Ea in his current form, with the horned tiara symbolizing the divinity and the waters gushing above his shoulders indicating his function as god of underground fresh waters, alongside his vizier Ushmu (right) and the deities Ishtar and Shamash (left). British Museum, London.

In the absence of her return, Ninshubur proceeded to seek the assistance of Enlil in Nippur and Nanna in Ur. However, they decline to assist Inanna, as the two deities hypothesize that the goddess has inadvertently caused her predicament. Following the plan, Ninshubur proceeded to Eridu to seek the assistance of Enki. He is more capable of understanding the implications of Inanna's death and devising a strategy to appease Ereshkigal and thus agrees to assist his sister. He then creates two asexual beings, the "kurgara", to whom he entrusts the "food of life", and the "galatura", to whom he entrusts the "drink of life", using the dirt under his fingernails. He sends them to the Underworld and issues instructions regarding their interactions with Ereshkigal, advising them to sympathize with the pains she is undergoing due to her children.

When she said: Ouch! My entrails!,

They said to her: "Oh our suffering sovereign, Ouch! Your entrails!" And when she said: "Ouch! My limbs!" They said to her: "Oh our suffering sovereign, Ouch! your limbs!" So much so that she declared to them: "Whoever you are, Since you express the pain passing From my entrails to your entrails, And from my limbs to your limbs, Divine, I will address you with a favorable greeting,

Human, I will assign you a favorable destiny!"

— Descent of Inanna into the Underworld – 17th century BCE

In response to such solicitous behavior, Ereshkigal consents to provide sustenance and refreshment to her newly arrived guests. The two beings decline the offer and instead request the corpse of Inanna. "We would prefer, they said, that you offer us the corpse hanging on the peg!" Then, they pour the "food of life" and the "drink of life" given by Enki on the goddess's body, thus revivifying her. However, before returning to Earth, Inanna is stopped by the judges of the Underworld, who stipulate that if she wishes to return to Earth and remain there, she must locate a living being to assume her role in the Underworld.

But, as she was preparing

To return from the Underworld, The Anunna held her back (and said to her): "Whoever has descended to the Underworld, Has never come out unscathed? If Inanna wants to return from the Underworld,

She must give us a substitute!"

— Descent of Inanna into the Underworld – 17th century BCE

Inanna, therefore, returns to Earth accompanied by seven demonic guardians of the Underworld (Gallu: demons or brigands) dispatched by the Anunna to guarantee the search for a "substitute" is conducted correctly. She then proceeds to Umma and Bad-tibira, where the tutelary deities prostrate themselves before her after performing the requisite mourning rites. The deities are each seized by the guardians, but Inanna intercedes on their behalf, as they have respected the mourning rites. As a result, they evade death and the search for a substitute continues. Subsequently, the goddess and her escort proceed to the city of Uruk Kulaba, "the great Apple Tree of the plain of Kulaba", where her husband Dumuzi is said to reside. He welcomes her "comfortably seated on a majestic dais." Enraged at his apparent disrespect for mourning, Inanna instructs the demons to seize him and take him to the Underworld in her place. However, an alternative translation suggests that the goddess's actions are not driven by anger and instead requests that the demons take "something" from Dumuzi (presumably his earthly life).

Inanna looked at him: a murderous look

She spoke against him a word: a furious word She shouted against him a cry: a cry of damnation!

"It's him! Take him away."

— Descent of Inanna into the Underworld – 17th century BCE

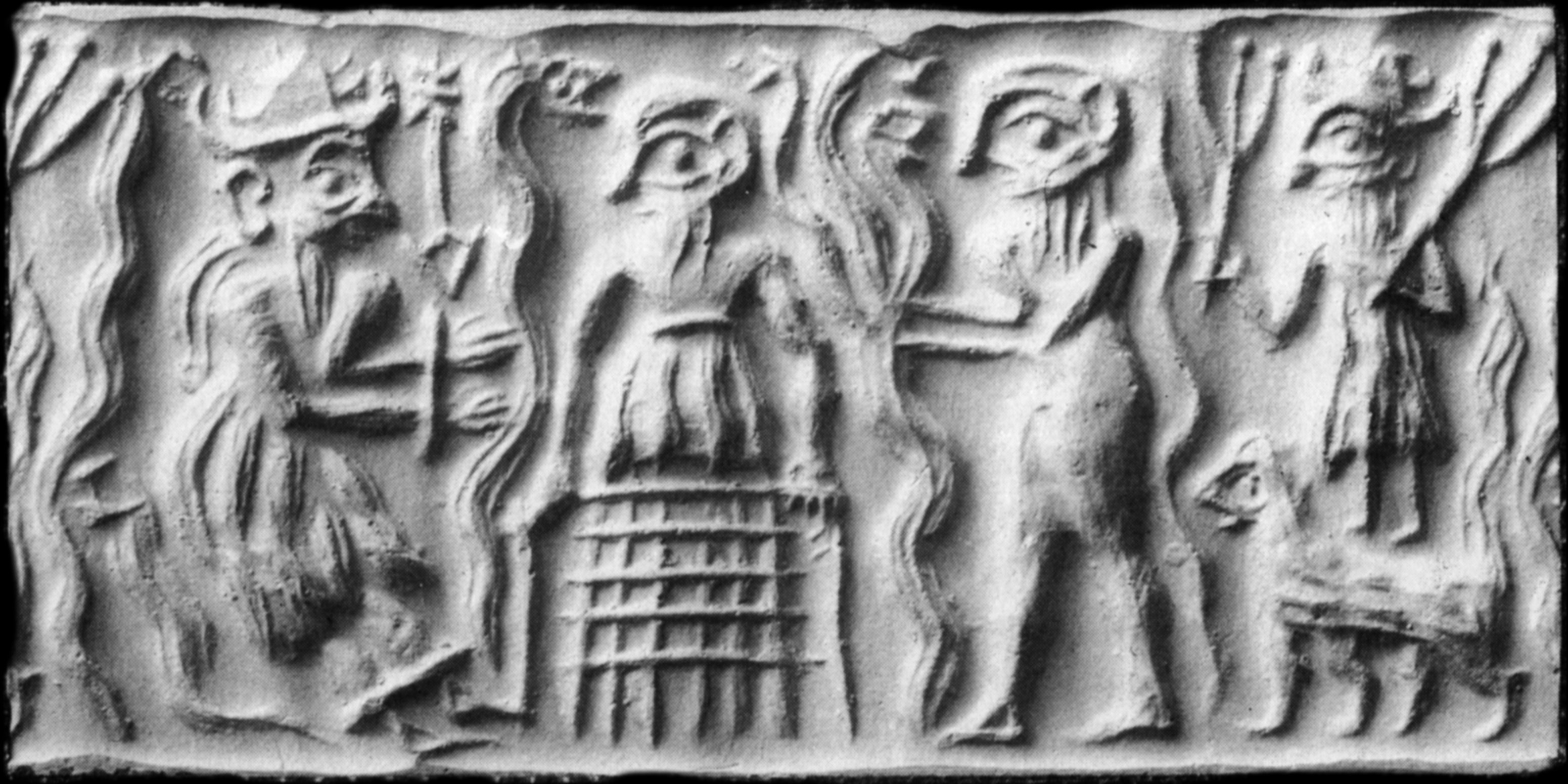
Cylinder seal impression that could represent Dumuzi during his stay in the Underworld. Emerging from a net, he is surrounded by two snakes and Gallu demons. British Museum, London.

Faced with this affliction, Dumuzi laments and petitions Utu, Inanna's sibling, who transforms him into a serpent. In this instance, the absence of a section in the manuscript necessitates that researchers draw upon other textual sources for insight. (Note: These include the myth of the Dream of Dumuzi, the lament of Inanna on the death of Dumuzi, and a text discovered in the ancient city of Ur.) Consequently, Dumuzi evades capture and takes refuge with his sister, Geshtinanna. However, Dumuzi is subsequently apprehended by the demons after being informed by a fly. He is then taken to the "Kur", which signifies both "mountains" and "the Underworld." (Note: The capture of Dumuzi can be seen as an illustration of the fears experienced by the inhabitants in the face of the threat posed by the mountain people. These were associated with demons (gallu) who were known to attack and plunder the villages of the low-lying plains of Mesopotamia.) Nevertheless, a reexamination of the text from Nippur suggests that after Dumuzi temporarily evades the demons, Inanna grieves for her deceased husband and searches for his body. She is guided by a fly and ultimately locates him, resulting in a mitigation of Dumuzi's fate.

The lacunary text allows for several interpretations, contingent on how it is read. It is possible that Ereshkigal, the goddess of the Underworld, was moved by Dumuzi's tears and thus softened the unfortunate's fate. She then determines that he will reside in the Underworld for only part of the year, with his sister Geshtinanna assuming his role for the remainder. It is similarly conceivable that Geshtinanna requests that Inanna assume her brother's role for half of the year in the Underworld. Inanna agrees to intercede with Ereshkigal to alleviate Dumuzi's suffering, responding to the tears of his sister. According to Bénédicte Cuperly, Inanna alone determines that Dumuzi will return among the living for half the year and be replaced by his sister Geshtinanna for the other half.

As [Inanna] cried for her husband, (she said):

"My man! After you were taken among the wandering spirits, Now, alas, [shall I fix your destiny?]: You: half the year; your sister: half the year. The day they bring you: on that day, you reside [...]

The day they bring her: on that day, she [...]."

— Descent of Inanna into the Underworld – 17th century BCE

The text ends with a conclusion and a prayer addressed to Ereshkigal.

This is how the holy Inanna

Made Dumuzi her substitute (?).

How sweet it is to celebrate you, August Ereshkigal!

— Descent of Inanna into the Underworld – 17th century BCE

A fragment from the same period discovered in Ur presents a story commonly called Dumuzi and Geshtinanna, which contains a different ending. In this version, Inanna is returned freely and alone from the Underworld among the living without her demon escort. However, later, Ereshkigal sends them to retrieve her, as she has not provided a substitute to replace her. The goddess, overcome with fear, then opts to deliver her husband Dumuzi to the demons. In this account, no rationale is provided for her decision other than her apprehension about returning to the Underworld. In this version, the demons are depicted as far more brutal, beating Dumuzi and imploring Utu to transform him into a serpent. Utu consents, more motivated by a desire to rectify an injustice than by the tears of Inanna's husband. Dumuzi flees and seeks refuge with his sister, Geshtinanna, who attempts to conceal him. The demons locate Geshtinanna and subject her to torture to ascertain the location of Dumuzi. Nevertheless, even if Geshtinanna does not divulge her brother's whereabouts, the demons ultimately locate him and transport him to the Underworld. The fragment concludes with Geshtinanna's anguished cries in the city. There is no allusion to Dumuzi's return and his replacement by his sister in this section. The end of the manuscript is missing, and an entire tablet may still be lacking. Some researchers and translators of the Descent of Inanna into the Underworld, including Thorkild Jacobsen, Jean Bottéro, and Samuel Noah Kramer, who did not take this tablet into account in their 1980 translation, consider this text to be part of the work. However, others, such as Bendt Alster and Dina Katz, believe it to be an independent text.

=== Akkadian version ===
While the narrative remains largely consistent with the Sumerian version, with the names of the deities undergoing alterations – Inanna becomes Ishtar, Nanna becomes Sin, Enki becomes Ea, Dumuzi becomes Tammuz, and Geshtinanna becomes Belilli – the text is considerably more concise, with numerous passages being omitted, including those about the goddess's grooming rituals and her discourse with Nishubur. The section devoted to Dumuzi is notably brief, and there is no indication that any other member of Ishtar's entourage might have been considered as a potential substitute. However, the Sumerian version incorporates additional details, particularly emphasizing the distress caused by Ishtar's demise in the realm of the living. Ereshkigal hypothesizes about Ishtar's intentions, summons Namtar, the arbiter of the Underworld, and issues directives to the various soldiers of the Underworld. Furthermore, Ereshkigal administers a distinct form of punishment to Ishtar, diverging from the Sumerian account. In this version, Ereshkigal instructs her servant Namtar to "unleash" the "sixty diseases" upon Ishtar. This suggests that the text is not a mere translation of the Sumerian work, but a creative reinterpretation.

In her quest for knowledge and understanding, Ishtar sets out on a journey to the "Land of No Return." She traverses the "path of no return", ultimately reaching the gates of the Underworld. There, she addresses the gatekeeper.

Gatekeeper! Open your door!

Open your door, that I may enter, I who speak to you! If you do not let me enter, I will hammer the door until I break the locks; I will shake the posts until I demolish the panels, And I will make the dead rise, Who will devour the living, So much so that the dead

Will outnumber the living!

— Descent of Ishtar into the Underworld – Around 10th century B.C.

Ereshkigal discerns Ishtar's intention to assume control over the Underworld and directs the gatekeeper to admit her "under the ancient rule of the Underworld." This entails the removal of one garment with each passage through one of the seven gates until she reaches Ereshkigal's throne. Consequently, she materializes in a state of undress before her sister, Ereshkigal. Ereshkigal then requests that Namtar, the arbiter of the Underworld, unleash upon her the Sixty Diseases, thereby vanquishing the goddess. This results in a total cessation of desire, mating behaviors, and physical love among the living.

Here, no bull mounted a cow,

No donkey impregnated a jenny,

No man impregnated a woman, at will:

Each slept alone in his chamber

And each woman went to bed alone!

— Descent of Ishtar to the Underworld – Around the 10th century BCE

In response to this catastrophic interruption, Ea dispatches a single emissary bearing the name "Su-su-namir", which translates to "His appearance is dazzling." This envoy is a gender-inverted figure, a feminized male or assinum, as the text describes him. He is charged with the responsibility of elevating the spirits of Ereshkigal to the point of consenting to the resurrection of Ishtar. The envoy fulfills his mission, and Judge Namtar is then tasked with sprinkling Ishtar with the water of life, which restores her life. However, Ereshkigal becomes aware of the true nature of the assinum and issues a curse upon him. She condemns him and his kind to a life of marginalization and exclusion.

Well! I will pronounce against you, su-su-namir,

A great curse,

And assign you forever a burdensome destiny;

Henceforth your sustenance

Will be what is produced by the "city-plows,"

And your drink, that drawn from the city gutters.

You shall loiter

Only in the recesses of the ramparts

And dwell only at the threshold of doors.

Drunkards and thirsty men will slap you at will!

— Descent of Ishtar to the Underworld – Akkadian literature

Once Ishtar has been restored to life, she can ascend to the world of the living. However, to maintain her presence there, she must identify a suitable replacement to take her place in the Underworld. In contrast with the Sumerian account, Ereshkigal provides instructions to the demons accompanying Ishtar, stipulating that they must ensure her replacement in the Underworld by Tammuz (Dumuzi in Akkadian). Additionally, one of the demons is ordered to perfume Tammuz, bathe him, and attend to his wellbeing, as well as introduce him to "joy girls" so that he may be cheerful upon meeting Ishtar upon her return.

As for Tammuz, the husband of her first love,

Have him wash with clear water, rub with perfume,

Dress him in a splendid garment:

Let him strike with the Blue Wand

And let joy girls animate his heart!

— Descent of Ishtar to the Underworld – Akkadian literature

Without any transition, Tammuz's sister—identified in Akkadian texts as Geshtinanna or "Belili"—expresses profound distress at the prospect of being separated from her brother. Ereshkigal adds that he will ascend to Earth accompanied by mourners.

"It is my only brother (cried Belili):

Do not tear him away from me!"

When Tammuz ascends

The Blue Wand and Red Circle

will ascend with him!

Ascending, to escort him, will be his mourners.

Even the dead will ascend

To inhale the good smell of the fumigations.

— Descent of Ishtar to the Underworld – Akkadian literature

== Reconstruction ==
Historian Dina Katz divides the myth into two parts, each of which can be considered an independent narrative. In the initial section of the narrative, Inanna provides directives to her aide, Ninshubur, before entering the netherworld. There, she encounters her sister and is saved from death by Enki, subsequently returning to the land of the living. The researcher emphasizes that, in light of the goddess's instructions to her assistant, Inanna's actions were not those of a careless and prideful individual. Instead, she meticulously planned her journey, orchestrated her demise, and deliberately provoked Enki's intervention to resurrect her. Regardless of her motives, Inanna's endeavor proved to be a resounding success. Moreover, for Bendt Alster, this episode is closely aligned with the myth of Inanna et Enki, in which Inanna enters the city of Uruk to steal the Me that is held by Enki. (Note: Despite the differences between Descent of Inanna into the Underworld and Inanna and Enki, where the god Enki is hostile towards the goddess, historian Bendt Alster identifies significant "invariances" between the two myths. These include the conquest of new powers ("me") by Inanna and the journey of the goddess whose return is ensured by the magic of the god.) The second part of the narrative commences immediately following the curse pronounced by Inanna against Dumuzi. It represents a condensed version of the Dream of Dumuzi myth, wherein the listener bears witness to Dumuzi's prolonged agony preceding his departure for the Underworld. The original sections of the Descent of Inanna into the Underworld narrative appear to encompass two distinct yet interrelated themes: Dumuzi's return and his replacement by Geshtinanna, and Inanna's condemnation to provide a substitute to occupy her role in the Underworld, accompanied by the search for this substitute. For Dina Katz, Inanna's condemnation represents an intermediate episode that bridges the two independent narratives that comprise the narrative. (Note: Dina Katz posits that Inanna's Descent into the Underworld is a myth that draws upon well-established astronomical and seasonal phenomena. The initial section of the myth recounts Inanna's descent, which is primarily associated with the cycle of the planet Venus. Conversely, the death of Dumuzi is linked to the cycle of the seasons.)

Researcher Noga Ayali-Darshan examines the multiple occurrences of the phrase Inanna ascends from the Underworld between lines 282 and 306 of the myth. These five occurrences serve as a splice between the two independent parts composing the narrative and seem to reflect specific editorial strategies (linked expansion and resumptive repetition) (Note: The associated expansion refers to the introduction of supplementary material through the repetition of a phrase, which serves to extend the narrative at a specific moment and incorporates new events at the moment of Inanna's departure from the Underworld. This allows for the incorporation of new narrative elements in a seamless manner, without compromising the overall coherence of the narrative structure. In contrast, the technique of resumptive repetition is employed to resume the original narrative sequence after an interruption caused by an addition. This is achieved by repeating the phrase at the end of the insertion, thus marking the return to the original narrative and maintaining narrative coherence.) used to integrate new additions to the original narrative. These repetitions are techniques that reinforce the narrative structure of the transitional passage. Therefore, it is crucial to understand these repetitions not as anomalies, but as integral elements in the textual and literary evolution of the Descent of Inanna to the Underworld myth.

=== A guilty goddess ===
This division prompts historian Dina Katz to posit that the Descent of Inanna into the Underworld represents a rearrangement of the myths that constitute this narrative. This rearrangement, whether intentional or not, has the effect of making Inanna responsible for her husband Dumuzi's death. Her conclusion is based on the complete absence of Inanna from the Dream Dumuzi myth. A myth in which the central character is Dumuzi, in the form of a god/shepherd whose nature is reduced to being taken by demons and dying after a premonitory dream. Additionally, she points out the existence of several lamentations by Inanna (Note: The lamentations are of two forms: balag, which is a liturgical lament accompanied by cymbals and lyres, and ershemma, which is recited by mourners accompanied by a tambourine. Both forms are characterized by a repetitive composition.) where the goddess mourns her husband Dumuzi's death and sometimes even seeks to avenge him, as is evident in Inanna and Bilulu.

While historian Jean Bottéro differs from Dina Katz in his interpretation of the Inanna and Bilulu poem, he posits that the narrative unfolds in a manner that attributes the demise of Dumuzi to the goddess. (Note: Furthermore, for researcher Iwo Slobodzianek, the mourning that Inanna undergoes in her laments does not necessarily indicate regret on the part of the goddess for her actions, nor does it imply a sense of remorse for her role in the death of her husband. Rather, it is perceived as a form of duty, a submission to the emotional norms that prevail in the context of loss. However, Bénédicte Cuperly posits that Inanna's mourning is wholly internalized by the goddess and that it is this profound grief that propels her to resurrect Dumuzi for half of the year.) He attributes this shift in the mythological account to what he terms a "socialization" of the myth. The naturalistic fertility myth is superseded by a new family concept. Inanna, the goddess associated with physical attraction, mating rituals, and desire, is depicted as a frivolous and capricious lover. She is also portrayed as the "left-hand wife", who, through an impulsive and prideful act, becomes responsible for her husband's disappearance. In the Descent of Inanna into the Underworld narrative, she is compared to another female personality, Geshtinanna. The latter personifies robust and courageous fraternal love, a love for which even life can be sacrificed. This contrasts with Inanna's inconstant desire, which ultimately results in the demise of her lover.

The prayer addressed to Ereshkigal at the end of the Sumerian version further accentuates Inanna's fault. This sudden emphasis on the Queen of the Dead, despite her secondary role in the plot, appears to imbue her with a more reflective character. Ereshkigal is the sole protagonist who genuinely benefits from her sister's impulsive action. This is in contrast to Inanna, an erratic and changeable deity who failed in her thoughtless endeavor to conquer and who, in the process, lost her husband. Furthermore, this supplication follows the recollection of Dumuzi's unfortunate destiny. It may be a precautionary measure intended to shield the storyteller from the formidable goddess of the Underworld.

In contrast, the Akkadian version of the myth depicts Inanna's responsibility diminishing to the extent that she shares it with her sister Ereshkigal. The latter, by discreetly ordering one of her demons to perfume, wash, and care for Tammuz and to introduce him to "joy girls", seems to have orchestrated a setup aimed at provoking Ishtar's anger when she meets a cheerful husband instead of a mourning one. While the curse Inanna pronounces against her lover remains a disconcerting gesture, it is nevertheless typical of the fiery and impulsive nature of the goddess in the Sumerian version. In the Akkadian version, however, Ereshkigal, the goddess of the Underworld, assumes some responsibility for Tammuz's fate. This may be seen as an attempt to avenge the loss of a valuable resident, namely Ishtar. Therefore, it can be seen that the myth has evolved, and between the two versions, the character of Inanna has been transformed into that of Ishtar, who is depicted as being constrained by circumstances that are more akin to those that a human could also endure.

=== The development of a funeral rite ===
Bénédicte Cuperly, building upon the division proposed by Dina Katz (see above), examines the latter portion as encompassing the establishment of funeral rites. Dumuzi does not attempt to evade his demise; rather, he dies immediately following Inanna's identification of him to the demons as a replacement for her in the Underworld. Inanna gazes at him with the same "death stare" that she received from Ereshkigal. A reexamination of the texts suggests that Inanna does not deliver Dumuzi in his entirety, but rather a portion of him. It can be reasonably deduced that Dumuzi's "thing" is likely to be his earthly life. Subsequently, Inanna and her brother Utu chase away the demons, thereby ensuring the accomplishment of the funeral rites. Subsequently, Dumuzi's transformations, his escapes, and the prayers he addresses to Utu are rituals that facilitate the elaboration of his "Gedim" (Note: In Mesopotamian belief, before descending into the Underworld, the deceased individual is believed to separate into two distinct entities: the ritually buried corpse and the Gedim (Etemmu in Akkadian). The Etemmu is considered to be the divine aspect of humanity. In the Atrahasis story, Enki, with the assistance of Wé, imbues this aspect with the divine essence, enabling humanity to serve the gods. Additionally, this immortal aspect survives the death of the mortal body.) and prevent the complete erasure of the deceased. In this way, the goddess allows Dumuzi the opportunity to reside in another form within the realm of the dead, thereby preparing him for the potential of returning to the land of the living. Innana does not slay Dumuzi out of anger; rather, her husband is the sole individual capable of collaborating with her to facilitate her escape from the Underworld.

Inanna's assimilation to Ereshkigal, the queen of the Underworld, is evidenced by her killing of Dumuzi in the second part. In the initial phase, Dumuzi is associated with Inanna, who is victimized by the queen of the Underworld. By leaving and returning from the Underworld, where she encountered death and resurrection, the goddess acquired the power to bestow death. Dumuzi's death is thus glorified, as it is caused by a goddess and allows this goddess to return to the world of the living. Consequently, through funeral rites, death is experienced by humans as that of Dumuzi: it is understood by the Mesopotamians as the end of one form of life and the beginning of another; therefore, it takes on meaning and can be partially transcended.

The myth of the Descent of Inanna into the Underworld exemplifies Dumuzi's royal aspect. (Note: Although Mesopotamian royalty is traditionally associated with marriages to the goddess Inanna, the kings of the Third Dynasty of Ur (21st century BC) and the Isin-Larsa period more formally identify with Dumuzi. In some cases, these kings spent a period in the Underworld before ascending to the sky in Inanna's celestial boat.) By allowing him to return annually in the spring, Inanna not only asserts her role as the mistress of death but also of life. To express gratitude for his self-sacrifice for her return to the land of the living, she takes him for six months each year into the heavens, where she resides. For the researcher, these elements provide corroboration for the hypothesis that the Descent of Inanna is a narrative composed by the goddess's clergy.

== Themes developed ==
The myth of Descent of Inanna into the Underworld, reconstructed from several independent myths, offers insight into the Mesopotamians' understanding of the infernal world and the cyclical nature of the seasons.

=== Cycle of seasons ===
In his analysis of Descent of Inanna into the Underworld, historian Thorkild Jacobsen identifies parallels between the ancient myth and the cyclical patterns observed in the natural world. He suggests that the narrative functions as an allegory of the seasonal cycle, where the return of life is contingent upon the death of another. Following Dumuzi's demise, which permits Inanna's continued existence, the character of Geshtinanna accepts her death to facilitate her brother's rebirth. In other instances, the latter is depicted as a barley grain used to make beer, while his sister is shown as a grape from which wine is made. The two deities each represent an intoxicating beverage, produced and stored alternately during the periods of the year when their respective gods are in the Underworld. In the initial section of Descent of Inanna into the Underworld, the narrative commences during the period when the grain reserves are no longer replenished by the harvest and are gradually consumed without being replenished—resembling the gradual depletion of the goddess as she traverses the seven gates—until only the remnants of dried meat remain on the hooks before the advent of new harvests and the return of the waters of the Apsû, the domain of the god Enki.

But for researchers less inclined toward naturalistic interpretations, the myth serves to illustrate the theme of seasonal alternation. This aspect is thought to originate from the myth of Dumuzi or even from ancient beliefs or traditions linked to the early ages of Uruk, reflecting a transformed view at the time of its writing.

=== Nudity of Inanna and the dead ===
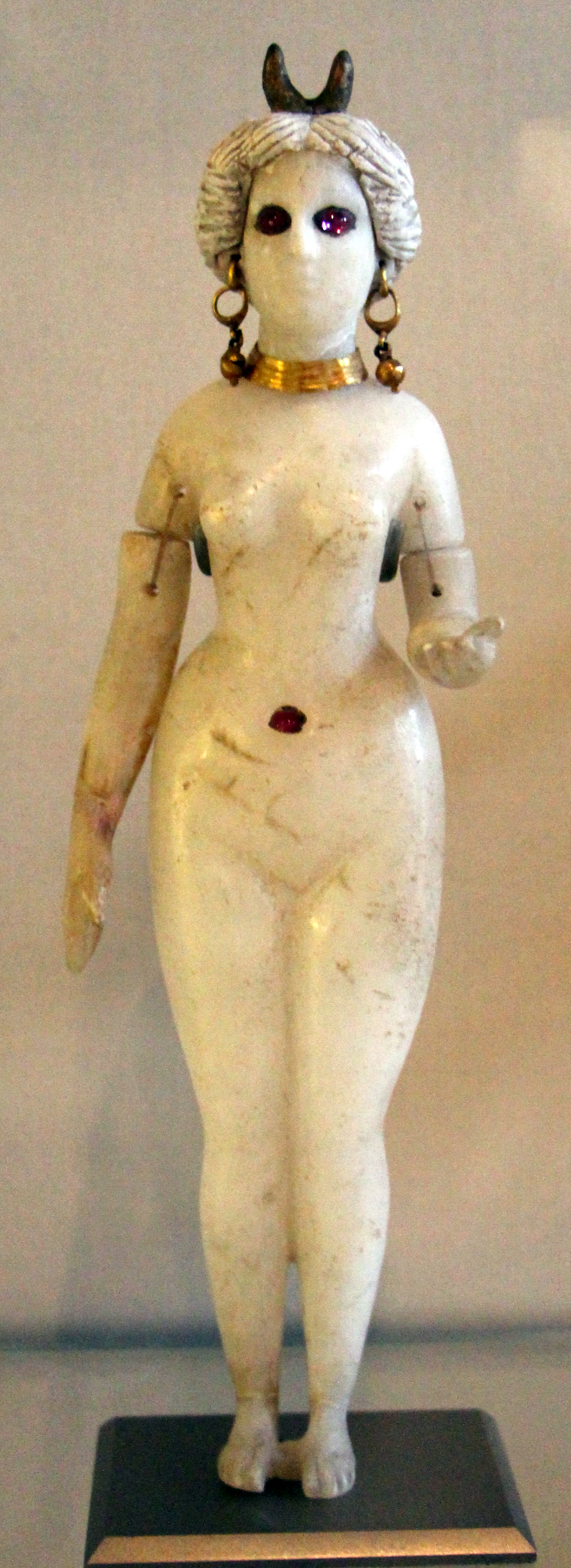
Statuette of Ishtar in alabaster: 3rd–2nd centuries BC. Musée du Louvre, Paris.

In the works of Jean Bottero and Samuel Noah Kramer, Inanna is depicted as being divested of her garments, which symbolizes the loss of her identity. Her powers are diminished; she is "subdued." She is so thoroughly stripped of all her powers that Ereshkigal has no difficulty in unleashing the "Sixty diseases" upon her, condemning her to "remain dead" and hanging her corpse on a hook. Thus, the dead arriving in the underworld are deprived of all vitality and placed on the same level as all other dead.

For Zainab Bahrani, professor of ancient art and Near Eastern archaeology, the nudity does not signify a weakening of the subject but rather a state of preparation. A review of Mesopotamian literature reveals no evidence of humiliation or a diminution of Inanna's powers. In fact, the dead—or residents of the realm of the dead—are often depicted or described in their nudity. (Note: Similarly, the transition from a state of undress to one of attire represents a transition into a more civilized way of life. This concept is exemplified in the Epic of Gilgamesh, wherein the animal-man Enkidu is socialized by a priestess of Ishtar and clothed before entering the city of Uruk.) For example, Ishtar is frequently represented naked with a cape or jewelry, which suggests that she is progressively prepared to reside in the realm of the dead.

In her analysis historian Dina Katz identifies several indications that the deceased were not conveyed to the Underworld in a state of undress or disrobing. King Ur-Nammu arrives in the realm of the dead in a chariot, bearing sumptuous gifts for the gods. In many royal tombs of Ur, it is difficult to discern whether the bodies are clothed or not. However, the deceased are adorned with a series of objects representing social status or wealth. Inanna/Ishtar's nudity, according to the historian, represents an exception to the general rule. To strip Inanna, Ereshkigal must trap the goddess of love and invent a story of seven gates to make her remove all her "Me." These are more related to desire and sexuality than to the dead and affliction. Ereshkigal seeks to impose a more appropriate "Me" on Inanna.

In the mythological accounts of Nergal et Ereshkigal, the god Nergal is depicted as venturing to the Underworld, where he is divested of his belongings but not of his garments. In light of this narrative, Inanna's nudity upon her arrival in the Underworld is significant due to the absence of her "Me." Another example can be found in the Epic of Gilgamesh, in which Enkidu, before entering the Underworld, is instructed by a friend to wear dirty clothes to avoid being identified as an intruder from the realm of the living. This suggests that the dead are not naked in the Underworld.

=== Geography of the underworld ===
Descent of Inanna into the Underworld offers a detailed account of the process of accessing the realm of the dead. In contrast, the Akkadian version of the myth provides a comprehensive description of this realm, which is referred to as "Irkalla", "the Great City", or "the Great Land." In accordance with the two works, one gains access to the realm of the dead, a domain of perpetual damnation, through the palace of Ganzer. This is achieved following a lengthy journey across an expansive steppe and numerous mountains via the "Path of No Return."

The "Path of No Return", which draws upon a multitude of exorcism texts, may be perceived as being somewhat inappropriate. The concept of ghosts (or etemmu) as entities that traverse the boundary between the living and the dead suggests a form of free movement between these two realms. These beings, which may either torment the living or be questioned by them, are thought to possess the capacity for movement between the two states. Some clues in the myth of Descent of Ishtar into the Underworld—like Inanna's threat to "make the dead rise who will devour the living"—indicate that if ghosts return, it is not of their own volition and must be triggered by an external factor. Furthermore, the fact that "dust accumulates on the door and lock" indicates that the exit from the Underworld is rarely opened.

Accordingly, the Underworld is furnished with a door and a lock. This is corroborated not only by the myth of Descent of Inanna into the Underworld but also by the accounts of Nergal and Ereshkigal, and to a lesser extent, Enlil and Ninlil. Beyond this portal, which Ishtar/Inanna or Nergal encounter, lie seven additional gates, leading to the core of the Underworld. Given the Underworld's reputation as a realm from which escape is challenging, these seven gates are occasionally conceptualized as being embedded within the walls encircling the Underworld. However, no textual evidence supports this hypothesis. In the narrative of Descent of Inanna into the Underworld, the directives the gatekeeper receives from his mistress Ereshkigal suggest that the seven gates are situated within the palace of Ganzer.

Do not forget what I command you!

Draw the bolt of the Seven Gates of the Underworld:

Open one after another

The doors of the palace of Ganzer, ...

— Descent of Inanna into the Underworld – 17th century BCE

In the Akkadian version, the Underworld is perceived by the Mesopotamians in a pessimistic light. The fate of the dead is not viewed as joyful, and pleasure and affection are absent. The deceased enters the netherworld as a spirit, an etemmu, and subsequently leads a pale imitation of their terrestrial existence. They "feed on earth", and the Epic of Gilgamesh adds that they "drink muddy water." The deceased engage in the same activities they did in their former life. However, how the living treat and commemorate the deceased is of paramount importance, as evidenced by the significance of mourning rituals in Descent of Inanna into the Underworld, which can mitigate the unfortunate fate of the departed.

In the Abode where those who arrive

Are deprived of light,

Sustained only by humus, fed on earth,

Collapsed in darkness, never seeing the day,

Clothed like birds, in a feathered garment.

— Descent of Ishtar to the Underworld – Around the 10th century BCE

In her analysis, historian Jo-Ann Scurlock posits that the depiction of the Underworld presented in the text of Descent of Ishtar into the Underworld is a deliberately crafted representation, shaped from the vantage point of the living or Ishtar herself. She also notes that Shamash, the sun god, alternates between above and below the earth's surface during its journey between day and night, thereby illuminating both the world of the living and the world of the dead. The deceased, despite experiencing a lack of stimulation, reproduce the same actions from their previous life while consuming bread and clear water. This is particularly evident given that all occurrences take place within a society that closely resembles that of the living, governed by a hierarchy represented by the couple Nergal and Ereshkigal, who reign in a palace crafted from lapis lazuli.

== Rites, prayers, and festivals ==
A review of accounting documents from multiple cities suggests the existence of a ritual named "Giranum" during the third dynasty of Ur. This ritual appears to have involved lamentations related to the descent of goddesses into the underworld and their return. While there are no immediate references to the myth of Descent of Inanna into the Underworld in these documents, the "Giranum" is celebrated in Ur at least in honor of Annunitum (Note: Annunitum is a warrior deity (deriving its name from the root meaning "battle"). It is regarded as a hypostasis of Ishtar (sometimes referred to as Ishtar Annunitum, "Ishtar of Battle," a title that appears to be particularly associated with Ishtar of Akkad) before attaining independent status.) or Ulmashitum, a goddess associated with childbirth. This ritual also includes a banquet, which may be a festive meal celebrating the return of these goddesses from the underworld.

The Akkadian version, Descent of Ishtar into the Underworld, concludes with what appear to be directives for the performance of mourning rituals in honor of Dumuzi. These are corroborated by evidence from the cities of Mari and Nineveh, which date to the Old Babylonian period. In Mari, the use of a substantial quantity of cereals for the mourners, as well as the regular cleansing of the statues of Ishtar and Dumuzi, are documented. These mourning rites were conducted during the fourth month, in mid-summer, and served to interpret the grief experienced by Dumuzi's mother, Ninsun (or Duttur, the divine ewe), his sister Geshtinanna, and even his wife Inanna. Furthermore, other documents indicate that mourning ceremonies for Dumuzi were still being held in the 2nd millennium BC in the kingdom of Mari. These include records of expenditure for oil "for the burial of Dumuzi" and "for Dumuzi, when he is resurrected." Additionally, several entries of Dumuzi in the sanctuary of Belet-ekallim are also mentioned.

The Sumerian version of Inanna's Descent to the Underworld concludes with a prayer to Ereshkigal, wherein the speaker expresses their delight at the opportunity to honor the deity: "How sweet it is to celebrate you, August Ereshkigal!" The text lacks any indication of ritualistic activity. However, during the Old Babylonian period, the statue of Inanna appears to have made regular journeys from Uruk to Kutha, the seat of the infernal deities, traversing the seven cities of Inanna referenced in Descent of Inanna into the Underworld.

Following the collapse of the Isin dynasty (18th century BC), Tammuz (the Akkadian iteration of "Dumuzi") appears to transition from a position as a deity of prosperity to a more subordinate role predominantly associated with the Underworld. From this perspective, the month of Tammuz is associated with the fourth month of the year (July), which corresponds to the beginning of the dry season and the celebration of his death. This celebration also provides an opportunity for an exorcism rite, in which wandering souls (etemmu) returning from the Underworld to haunt the living—along with diseases and afflictions—were entrusted to Tammuz so that he could guide them, as a benevolent shepherd, to the place from which they should not return.

During the Neo-Assyrian period (911-609 BC), a ritual called "Allatu" was performed in Nineveh during the month of Nissan (March–April) as part of the New Year festivities. This ritual entails the removal of a statue of the goddess Ishtar by an individual assuming the role of the goddess Ereshkigal ("Allatu" in Assyrian). Concurrently, a ritual designated as Taklimtu entailed the exposure and lamentation of the corpse and personal effects of Tammuz. (Note: Another source indicates that the statues of Tammuz and Ishtar were cleansed during the month of Tammuz (June).)

== Descent of Inanna through the centuries ==
=== Ishtar of Arbela and the Gnostics ===
In the words of the esteemed researcher Simo Parpola, the myth of Descent of Ishtar into the Underworld serves as the inspiration for the initiatory rites of the priests of the Ishtar sanctuary in Arbela, Assyria. During these rites, the endless worship of the goddess facilitates the attainment of a mystical union with the god Assur. According to the historian, a similar phenomenon occurs in the Gnostic myth of the Fall of Sophia and the theme of purification present in The Exegesis of the Soul, another Gnostic text composed between 120 and 135 AD.

Nevertheless, this interpretation is vigorously challenged within the historical community. For Jerrold Cooper, while certain patterns specific to the ancient Near East may persist in Hellenistic Greece, allowing for a similarity between Descent of Inanna into the Underworld and Gnostic myths, no written document or tangible evidence allows us to trace the origins of these texts back to Assyrian or Mesopotamian civilization.

=== Lamentations for Tammuz ===
Towards the end of the 1st millennium BC, Tammuz underwent a process of partial assimilation with Osiris, resulting in the emergence of Adon, which translates to "our lord" or "our master." Subsequently, his disappearance was commemorated annually in Cyprus, Jerusalem, Byblos, and subsequently in Rome and Greece (during a festival called "Deikrerion", a name derived from "Taklimtu") under the name of Adonis or even in Phrygia under the name of Attis. The theme of the disappearance and rebirth of vegetation alongside the descent and ascent of a divine figure is also found in several of these myths, particularly in the Greek myth of Persephone, daughter of Demeter. These numerous similarities between these myths and the Dumuzi cycle lead historians to conclude that Dumuzi is the prototype of the dying god.

Evidence of Tammuz worship emerges at the outset of the 10th century AD. The deity is referenced in the introductory section of the Nabataean Agriculture text. (Note: In this context, the Nabataean term is employed by Muslim authors to denote the indigenous population, who spoke Aramaic, particularly in Iraq. This term does not refer to the inhabitants of Petra.) The book, which was written or translated into Arabic by the Aramaic writer Ibn Wahshiyya, makes mention of lamentation rites addressed to Tammuz. These rites are conducted during the month of Tammuz, predominantly by Sabaean women in the vicinity of Baghdad and in the city of Harran. In addition to the association with the theme of death, the original significance of these rituals appears to have been entirely obfuscated. Tammuz is depicted as a poor man who is killed on multiple occasions in a gruesome manner and mourned for generations. It is similarly conceivable that, as a consequence of either forced or voluntary conversion of the Sabaeans to Christianity or of their coexistence with Christians in Harran, the lamentations for Tammuz underwent a gradual transformation into lamentations for the martyrdom of Saint George.

=== Inanna’s descent and the Bible ===
In the view of the religious historian Daniel Faivre, there are numerous parallels between the Sheol of the Hebrews and the Akkadian Irkalla, as evidenced, among other texts, in Descent of Ishtar into the Underworld. Both locations are depicted as desolate subterranean realms, characterized by a monochromatic palette and a pervasive dustiness, where the deceased are confined to a state of melancholy endurance. Moreover, the scarce remaining vestiges of ancient Hebrew religion also provide some indications of infernal deities. One such example is the couple Belial-Sheol, who possessed analogous prerogatives to the Sumerian-Akkadian couple Nergal-Ereshkigal. (Note: The link between Geshtinanna and Belili is acknowledged by historians, but the connection is not a prominent feature of their analysis.) Subsequently, through syncretism, Nergal/Belial became a fallen angel, while Ereshkigal/Sheol became the very place of the Underworld.

In verse 2:8 of the book of Nahum in the Old Testament, the word "stripped" (or "naked", in the Louis Segond translation) may allude to the stripping of the goddess in Descent of Ishtar into the Underworld. By correlating the verse of Nahum's prophecy with documents concerning the fall of Nineveh in 612 BC, the biblical scholar Aron Pinker offers an interpretation of the passage as a desperate appeal from the Ninevites to Ishtar. The Ninevites implore the goddess to intercede on their behalf and avert the impending attack by the Babylonians and the Medes. They petition her to descend from the Underworld with her husband Tammuz and save the inhabitants of the city from destruction.

It is done: she is stripped, she is taken away; her maidens moan like doves and beat their breasts.

— Nahum 2:8

An alternative interpretation of these verses is that they refer to the deportation of Ishtar's statue. This is evidenced by the use of the words "deported", "taken away", and "displaced" (or "taken away", in the Louis Segond translation). The exegete Mathias Delcor posits that the stripping of the statue of all its riches and the theft of it represents a simple mark of victory imposed by the invaders of Nineveh on the conquered city.

With regard to the reference to the doves, it appears to be a purely Babylonian formulation intended to convey the anguish and suffering experienced by Ishtar's "maidens." Nevertheless, it is not implausible to view the dove as a symbol of the goddess, although this is not formally attested in Babylon. Conversely, it is well attested in Palestine, where the dove represents Astarte.

In the Bible, Dumuzi is referred to by his Akkadian name, Tammuz, in the Book of Ezekiel.

And he brought me to the entrance of the gate of the house of the Lord, which was toward the north. And behold, there were women sitting there, weeping for Tammuz.

— Ezekiel 8:14

This prophetic vision can be related to the following verse, in which the prophet observed men engaged in the act of worship directed toward the Sun at the entrance of the temple itself (Ezekiel 8:16). These two verses symbolize the transition from spring to summer, which is represented by the sun.

There are no other indications of the worship of Tammuz or Ishtar in the Old Testament. But the worship of Tammuz bears a resemblance to the worship of Hadadrimmon, as referenced in a verse from the Book of Zechariah. In this verse, the prophet compares the mourning rituals performed for King Josiah to other ritual laments that would have been conducted in the valley of Megiddo.

In that day there shall be a great mourning in Jerusalem, like the mourning of Hadadrimmon in the valley of Megiddo.

— Zechariah 12:11

Additionally, the Book of Daniel in the Bible reveals a correlation between Tammuz and the deity "al hemdat nashîm", which translates to "dear to women."

He shall regard neither the gods of his fathers nor the desire of women; nor regard any god, for he shall exalt himself above them all.

— Daniel 11:37

=== Music and choreography ===
In 1896, Vincent d'Indy composed a suite for orchestra titled Istar, op. 42. The composer draws inspiration from the goddess's journey through the seven gates of the Underworld, subjecting his musical theme to variations that, like the goddess's deprivation, range from the composed to the simple. The composer reveals the theme that inspired him in the creation of the work at the moment of the reunion of Ishtar and her beloved in the Underworld. In a letter dated September 15, 1896, d'Indy confided to his friend Ropartz: "I am skeptical that any audience will comprehend the unconventional structure of my composition. Nevertheless, I believe it will be engaging to listen to, despite the lack of contextualization. However, I found the process of composing it immensely enjoyable."

On July 10, 1924, the variations by Vincent d'Indy were performed as a one-act ballet at the Opéra Garnier. The production featured Ida Rubinstein and Serge Lifar, with sets and costumes designed by Léon Bakst and choreography by Léo Staats.

=== Psychoanalysis, therapies and Art ===
Psychoanalysts, such as mythologists, anthropologists, and philosophers, recognize myths as expressions of psychic realities and psychological processes that have persisted over centuries. They are interested in the narratives of antiquity and seek to decode the insights of the ancients regarding the psychic realities that have shaped human behaviors and attitudes, both in the past and in the present. In the case of Sigmund Freud, for instance, the myth of Oedipus serves as the foundational myth for his entire psychological theory.

In 1949 the American mythologist and lecturer Joseph Campbell elucidated the plot of the myth of Descent of Inanna into the Underworld as an allegorical representation of the necessity to disarm the Ego of its social defenses and adornments—the seven adornments of Inanna—that encumber it before confronting the Shadow. The "external help" (the galatura and the kurgara) is a natural consequence of the Ego's stripping of its defenses.

In 1953 psychoanalyst Mary Esther Harding interpreted Descent of Ishtar into the Underworld as an expression of the transpersonal aspect of love and sexual desire. During Ishtar's sojourn in the Underworld, there is no manifestation of Eros or fertility on Earth. However, upon her return, men (and animals and plants) begin to exhibit behaviors indicative of love and reproduction. In other words, the feeling of love, the attraction between men and women, and the relationship between the sexes cannot be explained solely in terms of reproductive instinct. This myth illuminates the enigmatic and celestial essence of love. "The powers of love and fertility were the effects of a living spirit that Ishtar carried with her. She was imbued with this spirit and bestowed it freely whenever love was awakened within her. If the "Underworld" is conceptualized as the unconscious, it becomes evident that love and desire are not solely a function of conscious volition or instinctive attraction. The repressed and unconscious aspects of personality are involved, as well as an irrational dimension that includes instinct but also spirit and the spiritual. This is evidenced by the fact that love as a spirit or psychic force can disappear or remain absent unbeknownst to conscious intentions. This somewhat changeable and capricious side of love and desire is paralleled by the cyclical quality of nature and its seasons.

In 1983 poet and folklorist Diane Wolkstein, with the assistance of historian Samuel Noah Kramer, reconstructed the myth based on the Sumerian version. She adapted its form to facilitate a more contemporary and continuous reading experience. She presented the life of a goddess from her youth to her maturity. Descent of Inanna into the Underworld, as interpreted by Wolkstein, represents a form of personal crisis that forces the individual to descend into their depths to "meet their Shadow". The resolution of the crisis entails a union between Inanna and her "dark side", personified as her sister Ereshkigal. During Inanna's descent into the Underworld, Ereshkigal assumes control, seizing her powers. Wolkstein interprets the final line of praise directed to Ereshkigal as a poem honoring the more negative aspects of the psyche and the necessity to embrace the Shadow.

These psychological themes and interpretations of the myth continue to inspire modern artistic expressions, such as the 2026 Kurdish film, Anfa 8, directed by Karzan Kardozi, which is directly based on the myth of the Descent of Inanna into the Underworld.

== See also ==
- Inanna
- Ereshkigal
- Dumuzid
- Geshtinanna
- Star of Ishtar
- Persephone
- Mesopotamian mythology
- Ancient Mesopotamian underworld

== Bibliography ==
- Bottéro, Jean; Kramer, Samuel Noah (1989). Lorsque les dieux faisaient l'homme : Mythologie mésopotamienne. Bibliothèque des Histoires (in French). Paris: Gallimard. ISBN 978-2-07-071382-0.
- Bottéro, Jean; Kramer, Samuel Noah (2011). L'érotisme sacré : à Sumer et à Babylone (in French). Paris: Berg International Éditeurs. ISBN 978-2-917191-37-8.
- Cuperly, Bénédicte (2021). Betrayal, regrets, flies and demons : philological and historical analysis of Dumuzi's catabasis in the Sumerian epic Innana's Descent to the netherworld (PhD thesis). Paris: École doctorale d'Histoire de l'Université Paris 1 Panthéon-Sorbonne. Archived from the original on 2007-06-15.
- Grandpierre, Véronique (2012). Sexe et amour de Sumer à Babylone (in French). Paris: Gallimard – Folio Histoire. ISBN 978-2-07-044618-6.
- Joannès, Francis (2001). Dictionnaire de la civilisation mésopotamienne. Bouquins (in French). Paris: Robert Laffont. ISBN 2-221-09207-4.
- Kramer, Samuel Noah (2015). L'histoire commence à Sumer : Nouvelle édition. Champs Histoire (in French). Paris: Flammarion. ISBN 978-2-08-137651-9.
- Van der Stede, Véronique (2007). Mourir au pays des deux fleuves : L'au-delà mésopotamien d'après les sources sumériennes et akkadiennes. Lettres Orientales (in French). Louvain: Peeters. ISBN 978-90-429-1947-1. Archived from the original on April 27, 2021.
