= Aplysia rehderi =

Scientific classification
- Kingdom: Animalia
- Phylum: Mollusca
- Class: Gastropoda
- Order: Aplysiida
- Family: Aplysiidae
- Genus: Aplysia
- Species: A. rehderi

Binomial name
- Aplysia rehderi Eales, 1960

Synonyms
- Aplysia (Varria) rehderi Eales, 1960

Species of gastropod

Aplysia rehderi is a species of gastropod mollusc in the genus Aplysia, family Aplysiidae.

== Description ==
The length of the species attains 116 mm. It is 40 mm wide and 62 mm high.

== Distribution ==
This marine species occurs off Monterey, California.
