= Cole Museum of Zoology =

University museum in Berkshire, England

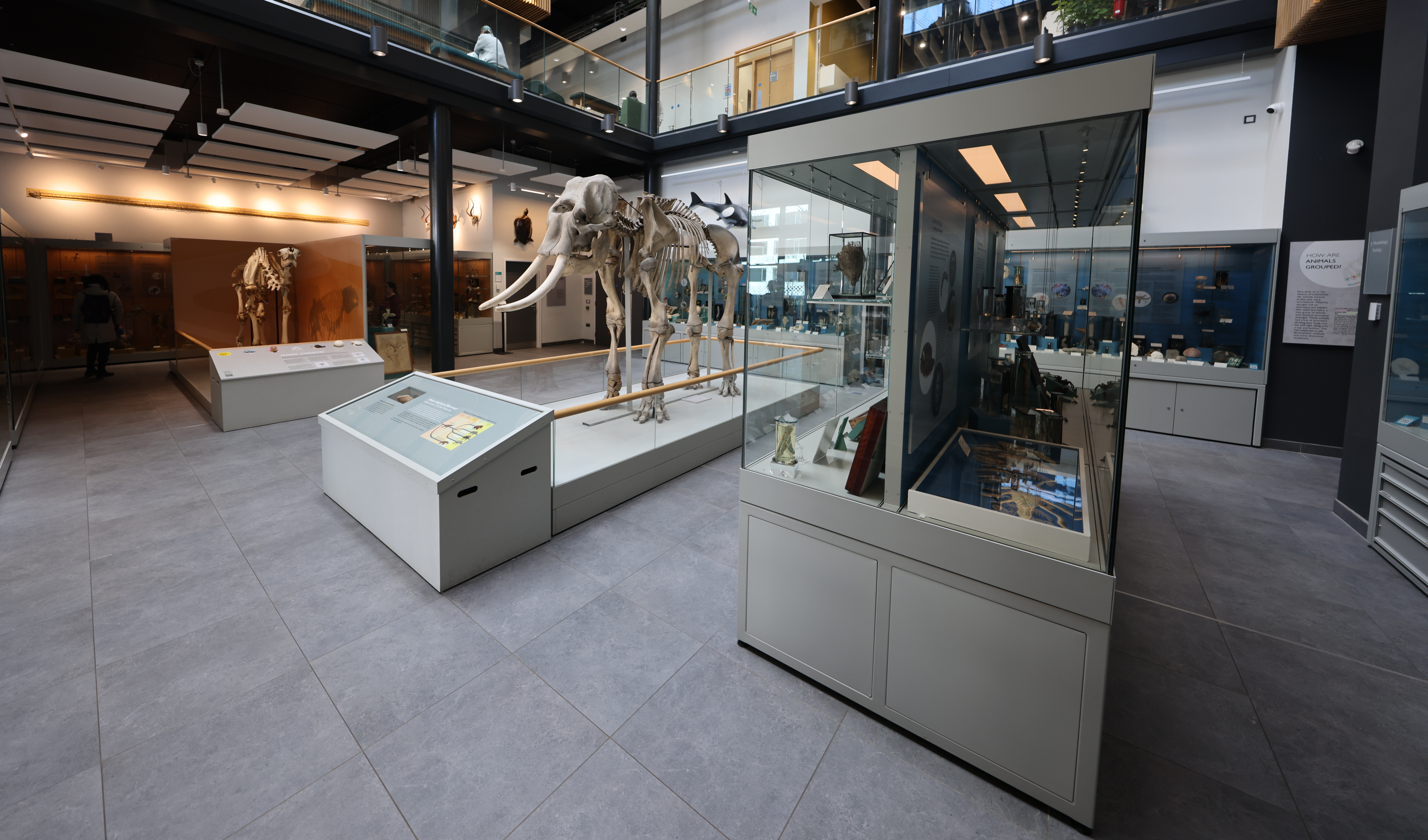
- The gallery space of the museum

- Location within Reading
- Established: Early 20th century
- Location: Reading, Berkshire, UK
- Coordinates: 51.442375°N 0.945414°W
- Type: University museum
- Collections: Zoology
- Curator: Dr Amanda Callaghan
- Website: reading.ac.uk/colemuseum/

The Cole Museum of Zoology is a university museum, part of the School of Biological Sciences at the University of Reading. It is located on the ground floor of the Health and Life Sciences building on the university's Whiteknights Campus in the town of Reading, Berkshire, England. The collection was established in 1907.

== History ==
The collection was established in the early 20th century by Professor of Zoology Francis J. Cole, along with Dr Nellie B. Eales, who catalogued the collection, and Mr Stoneman. The collection was assembled between 1907 and 1939, at which point Cole retired. On Cole's death in 1959, the University also purchased his library of books, which are kept as a special collection in the main library.

The museum was housed at the University's London Road Campus until the 1970s, when it was moved to the Whiteknights Campus. The museum moved to a new location in the Health and Life Sciences building, still on the Whiteknights Campus, in 2021.

== Collections ==
It contains about 4,000 specimens of which about 400 are on display at any one time. Specimens are arranged in 14 cases in taxonomic sequence, thus enabling a complete tour of the diversity of the animal kingdom. Specimens include a male Indian circus elephant skeleton, a 5-metre reticulated python skeleton containing 400 vertebrae, a fossil of the largest spider to ever have lived, and a false killer whale skeleton. The elephant was named Norman and his skeleton was purchased for the museum in 1921.

The museum also hosts the collection as a virtual museum.

The collections are maintained by staff from the University's School of Biological Sciences.

== See also ==
- University of Reading
