= List of fellows of the Royal Society elected in 1926 =

This is a list of people elected Fellow of the Royal Society in 1926.

== Fellows ==
- Sir Joseph Arthur Arkwright
- Sir Edwin John Butler
- Sir Samuel Rickard Christophers
- Francis Joseph Cole
- Sir Alfred Charles Glyn Egerton
- Ezer Griffiths
- Sir Harold Brewer Hartley
- Hamilton Hartridge
- George Barker Jeffery
- Owen Thomas Jones
- William Cudmore McCullagh Lewis
- Edward Arthur Milne
- Lewis Fry Richardson
- Sir Henry Thomas Tizard
- Robert Scott Troup

== Foreign members ==
- Martinus Willem Beijerinck
- Niels Henrik David Bohr
- Ernst Julius Cohen
- Willem Einthoven
- Karl Immanuel Eberhard Ritter von Goebel
- Henry Fairfield Osborn
- Max Karl Ernst Ludwig Planck
- Arnold Johannes Wilhelm Sommerfeld
