= Amanda Callaghan =

British entomologist and researcher

Amanda Callaghan FRES
- Education: London School of Hygiene and Tropical Medicine (PhD)
- Scientific career
- Workplaces: University of Montpellier; University of Reading

Amanda Callaghan FRES is an entomologist in the United Kingdom.

== Education and career ==
Callaghan was awarded a PhD in Insect Biochemistry from the London School of Hygiene and Tropical Medicine in 1989, she then moved to the University of Montpellier as a Royal Society Science Exchange fellow.

Since 1990 she has been based at the University of Reading, where she is Professor of Invertebrate Zoology and is also Curator of the Cole Museum of Zoology.

== Research ==
Her research looks at freshwater invertebrates and she specialises in British mosquitoes, and the microplastic pollution and ecotoxicology of freshwater invertebrates.

Callaghan has shown in lab experiments that microplastic particles fed on by a mosquito larvae will remain in its body when it metamorphoses to pupa and then to a flying adult mosquito.

She monitors British mosquito species to look at whether their distribution and behaviour is changing in response to global climate change and whether there might be a risk of Malaria disease transmission in Northern Europe. In particular she has highlighted that the use of water butts in UK gardens can create a habitat in which female mosquitoes can lay their eggs.
