= Anfa 8 =

- Sorani Kurdish: ئەنفا ٨
- Directed by: Karzan Kardozi
- Written by: Karzan Kardozi
- Produced by: Karzan Kardozi
- Starring: Barzan Yunis; Kanar Sarchl; Taha Mohamad; Ragash Kizhan; Nvar Yasin
- Cinematography: Lana Diyar
- Release date: 11 September 2026
- Running time: 110 minutes
- Countries: United States; Kurdistan Region
- Language: Kurdish

Anfa 8 (Sorani Kurdish: ئەنفا ٨) is a 2026 Kurdish Americans independent science fiction neo-noir thriller film written, directed, produced, edited, and scored by Karzan Kardozi. It is the first Kurdish feature film in the science fiction genre. It serves as the second installment in Kardozi's Myth Trilogy, following his 2024 film Where is Gilgamesh?.

Set in a dystopian future where an artificial intelligence controls a sunless city, the film stars Barzan Yunis as Horus, a hunter tracking down members of a solar worshiping cult. The film's narrative draws heavily from the ancient mythologies of Mesopotamia and ancient Egypt, specifically Descent of Inanna into the Underworld and The Contendings of Horus and Seth.

== Plot ==
In the future city of Soli, an artificial intelligence known as Anfa 8 maintains absolute control. In this dystopian setting, the sun no longer exists, and the city is plunged into eternal night. The citizens are completely unaware of the concept of daytime or the sun. A rebellious occult group of sun-worshippers desperately seeks to free themselves from Anfa 8's rule. Viewing them as a threat, Anfa 8 utilizes a specialized task force called the Shopazho. Horus, a member of this force, is tasked with hunting down and eliminating the renegade cult members.

== Cast ==
- Barzan Yunis as Horus
- Kanar Sarchl as Inanna / Amaterasu
- Taha Mohamad as Anfa 8 / Number One
- Farhad Saddi as Driver
- Ragash Kizhan as Honeywell 6022
- Nvar Yasin as Anfa 8 Adviser
- Yasin Omar as Number 3

== Production ==
Anfa 8 is an independent micro-budget feature, self-funded entirely by the director with a budget of only $8,000. Principal photography took place over 18 nights in December 2025. Filming occurred entirely on location in Sulaymaniyah, Kurdistan Region, utilizing a small crew of only five people. Because the film is set in a world without a sun, the production was shot completely at night. The film was shot in black and white.

== Themes ==
Anfa 8 introduces a new direction for Kurdish cinema, moving away from classic social themes and entering the realm of science fiction and neo-noir. The film's title, referencing the 1988 Anfal campaign, explores the concept of a "digital Anfal"—a digital genocide where a machine system manipulates memories, erases true history, and distorts the Kurdish language as a metaphor for the loss of linguistic identity. The eternal darkness of the city of Soli serves as a symbol for political obscurity and social despair, while characters like Horus and Inanna embody ancient mythological archetypes navigating modern oppressive structures.

== Release ==
The film premiered theatrically at Cinema Salim in Sulaymaniyah, Kurdistan Region, on September 11, 2026, alongside screenings in Erbil and Kalar.

Outside of the Kurdistan Region, Anfa 8 is scheduled to make its world premiere at the 21st Jogja-NETPAC Asian Film Festival in Indonesia on November 30, 2026, screening as part of the Asian Perspectives Features selection.

== See also ==
- Where is Gilgamesh?
- Descent of Inanna into the Underworld
- The Contendings of Horus and Seth
