= The Contendings of Horus and Seth =

Mythological story from the Twentieth Dynasty of Ancient Egypt

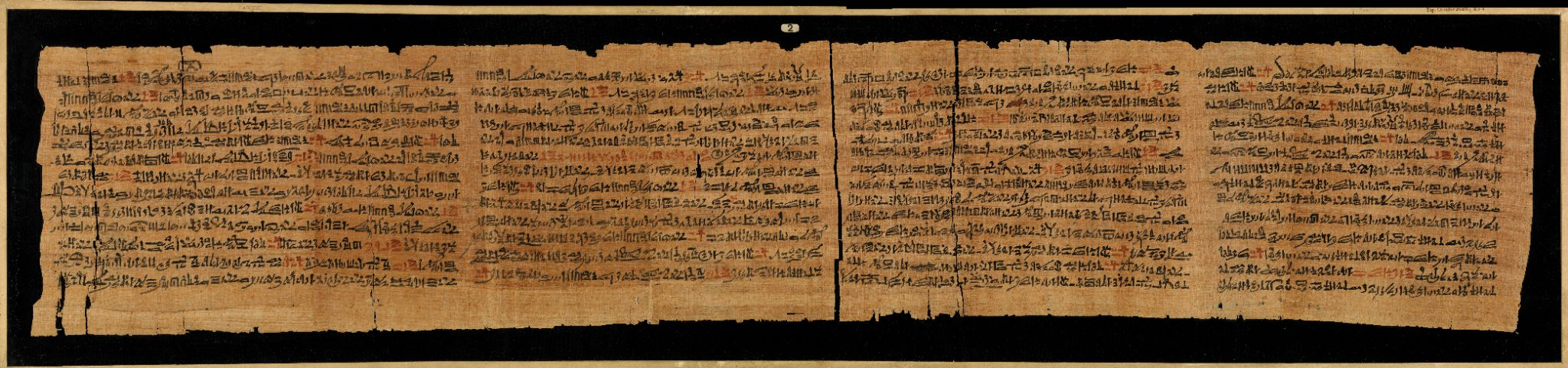
- Manuscript of 'Contendings of Horus and Seth' in hieratic script in the Chester Beatty Library
- Size: length: 55 cm
- Created: c. 1147 BC
- Discovered: 1931; Luxor, Luxor Governorate, Egypt
- Present location: Dublin, County Dublin, Ireland

"The Contendings of Horus and Seth" is a mythological story from the Twentieth Dynasty of Egypt found in the first sixteen pages of the Chester Beatty Papyri and deals with the battles between Horus and Seth to determine who will succeed Osiris as king.

== Chester Beatty Papyrus I ==
The Papyrus Chester Beatty I dates to the Twentieth Dynasty during the reign of Ramesses V (reigned 1149–1145 BCE) and likely came from a scribe's collection that was recorded for personal entertainment (Chester Beatty Pap I, Oxford). The papyrus contains the story of The Contendings of Horus and Seth as well as various other poetic love songs. The original provenience of the papyrus was Thebes. When found, the papyrus measured 55 cm (22 in) and had been torn and crushed. The papyrus was published by the Oxford University Press in 1931 and currently is located in the Chester Beatty Library in Dublin.

== The story ==
Horus tying upper and lower Egypt together with Seth.

Arguably the most important part of the Chester Beatty Papyrus I is the mythological story of "The Contendings of Horus and Seth" which deals with the battles between Horus and Seth to see who will be the successor to the throne of Osiris. The specific time of the Contendings is a period during which the fighting has temporarily stopped and Seth and Horus have brought their case before the Ennead. Throughout the story, Horus and Seth have various competitions to see who will be king. Horus beats Seth each time. The beginning of the story consists of Seth and Horus pleading their cases to the deities of the Ennead, who then share their opinions. Later in the story, Seth and Horus fight several long battles until Horus finally wins and becomes the king.

== Consequences of the story ==
The story of "The Contendings of Horus and Seth" is important to Egyptian society because of its significance to kingship. The story reflects the customary pattern of inheritance for kingship in Ancient Egypt: father to son. The story is also significant to the idea of divine kingship because it sets up the idea of the triad of Osiris as the dead king, Horus as the living king on earth, and Isis as the king's mother.

== Further reading and academic analyses ==
Many researchers and Egyptologists have dealt with "The Contendings of Horus and Seth". John Gwyn Griffiths, for example, talks about the whole conflict between Horus and Seth in his book The Conflict of Horus and Set. In the book, Griffiths discusses the different aspects of the ongoing battle for the office of Osiris, including the mutilations, homosexual episode, and the trial. Griffiths argues that the myth is of political and historical origin and that the story of Horus and Seth has to do with tribal struggles before the unification of Egypt. Other historians have discarded this idea when it comes to "The Contendings of Horus and Seth" and say that this particular story was created simply as a religious myth and that it should not be considered of historical context (Oxford Encyclopedia of Ancient Egypt).

In Ancient Egyptian Literature, Antonio Loprieno argues that the Contendings is one of the first instances of "mythology as a textual genre" and when mythology enters the literary field. He says that this has to do with the story as a political satire (Loprieno 50)

In the Oxford publication of the Chester Beatty Papyrus I that contains "The Contendings of Horus and Seth", the discussion is conducted by Alan H. Gardiner, where he compares the story with the stories of the Greek deities and of Homer's Odyssey.

== In popular culture ==
The myth of the conflict between Horus and Set has been adapted into various modern media:

- In literature, Rick Riordan's 2010 fantasy novel The Red Pyramid (the first installment of The Kane Chronicles) is heavily based on the Osiris myth and the subsequent contendings. The plot follows two siblings who host the gods Horus and Isis to battle Set after he banishes their father, who serves as the host for Osiris.
- The 2016 fantasy action film Gods of Egypt, directed by Alex Proyas, centers on the mythological battle for the throne of Egypt. The film depicts Horus partnering with a mortal thief to overthrow his uncle Set, who usurped the kingdom and plunged it into chaos after murdering Osiris.
- The Kurdish-American science fiction film Anfa 8 (2026) reimagines The Contendings of Horus and Seth as a futuristic conflict between humanity and artificial intelligence. In the narrative, the figure of Seth is represented by Anfa 8, a rogue AI that rules over the dystopian city of Soli. Drawing parallels to the mythic struggle for dominion, Anfa 8 plunges the city into darkness by covering the sky with a massive silver dome. The film's protagonist, representing Horus, battles the AI to shatter the dome and restore the sun, mirroring the ancient mythological themes of order conquering chaos and the restoration of natural balance.

== See also ==
- Ancient Egyptian literature
