= Francis Cole =

English zoologist (1872–1959)

- Born: Francis Joseph Cole; 3 February 1872; London
- Died: 27 January 1959 (aged 86)
- Education: University of Oxford
- Known for: Founded Cole Museum of Zoology and Cole Library
- Awards: FRS (1926); Rolleston Prize; Neill Gold Medal
- Scientific career
- Fields: Zoology
- Workplaces: University of Liverpool; University of Reading

Francis Joseph Cole FRS (3 February 1872 – 27 January 1959) was an English zoologist and a professor at the University of Reading for 33 years.

== Education ==
Cole was born in London and educated at Sir Walter St. John's School, Battersea and Jesus College, Oxford.

== Career ==
Cole was a lecturer in zoology at the University of Liverpool from 1897 until 1906, when he became Professor of Zoology at the University of Reading, the first holder of the post. He then began setting up the Cole Museum of Zoology, encouraging overseas visitors to the Department to donate specimens. He remained at Reading, until retiring in 1939, but carried on writing in retirement. He wrote in particular on comparative anatomy and the history of zoology, after his early work on the morphology of fish. His works included a "History of Protozoology" (1926), "Early Theories of Sexual Generation" (1930) and a "History of Comparative Anatomy from Aristotle to the Eighteenth Century" (1944).

Cole was a keen book collection and compiled a library of around 8000 volumes of books and scientific papers focussed on zoology, medicine and natural history. The collection was catalogued by zoologist Nellie B. Eales and is held at the University of Reading's Special Collections.

He retired from Reading in 1939 being replaced by Prof Charles Henry O'Donoghue.

== Awards and honours ==
Cole was elected a Fellow of the Royal Society (FRS) in 1926, and won the Neill Gold Medal of the Royal Society of Edinburgh in 1908. He was the 1950 Wilkins Lecturer.
