= University museum =

Museum run within a university

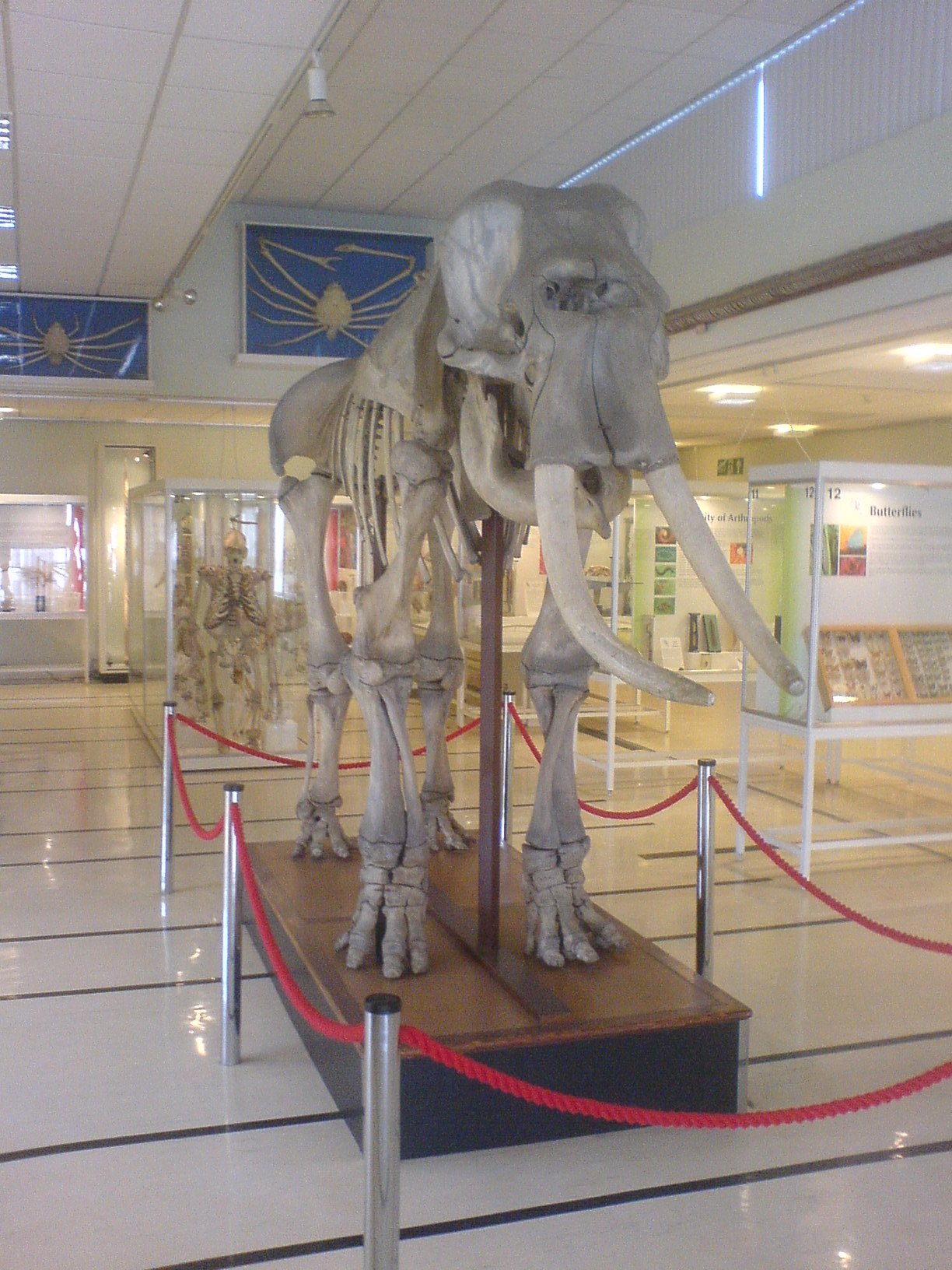
A mounted Elephant skeleton at the Cole Museum of Zoology, situated in the University of Reading's Whiteknights Campus.

A university museum is a repository of collections run by a university, typically founded to aid teaching and research within the institution of higher learning. The Ashmolean Museum at the University of Oxford in England is an early example, originally housed in the building that is now the Museum of the History of Science. A more recent example is the Holburne Museum of Art in Bath, established in 1882, which is now the official museum of the University of Bath.

== Mission ==
Historically, the focus of university museums and galleries included curatorial research into, as well as the display of, commemorative, ceremonial, decorative and didactic collections. For academics, these collections served as a valuable research resource. For students, museums performed both a leisure and learning function, developing their visual literacy, critical thinking, and creative skills. Aside from campus, museums served their perspective city and town's communities, spreading museological literacy among the different target audiences.

With decades, the role of the university museums changed as they started to become more open and receptive to the cultural needs of the public. Public educational outreach is considered now by many university museums as an integral part of their mission, some even adopt a market approach. Changes and decentralization of the institutional values coinciding with budgeting shortfalls in some cases "gave rise to tensions and a lack of cohesive identity among a demoralized staff". Many campus museums "have critical needs for facilities, staff, and support". In the 21st century, despite the challenges brought by transition, the university museums not only continue to play important role in object-based learning (tradition that reaches beyond the record of the founding of the University of Bologna) but also perform important civic and cultural functions for the larger society.

== Typology ==
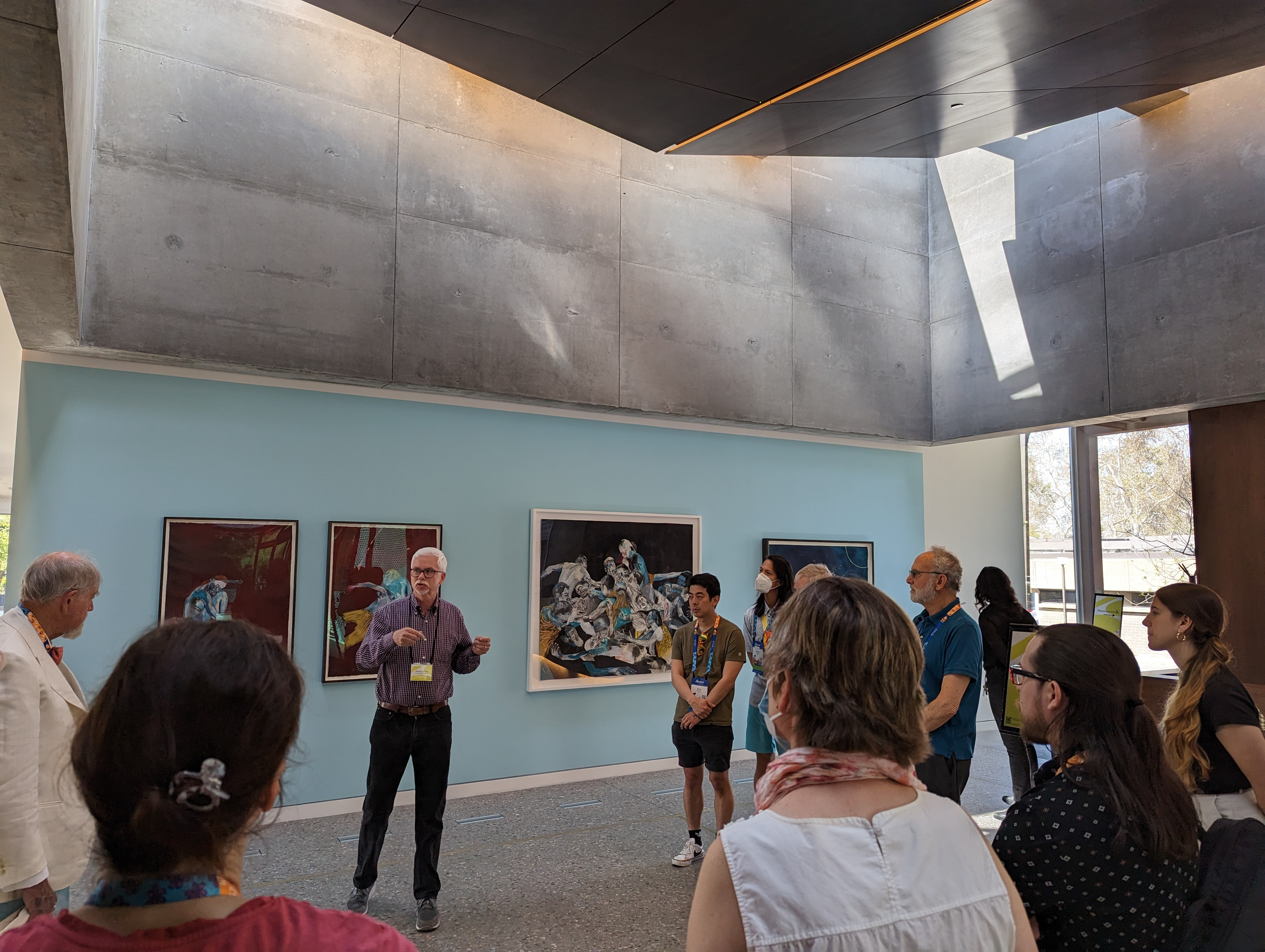
A guided tour of the Benton Museum of Art at Pomona College in Claremont, California

Organizationally, university museums are represented by a variety of historical, traditional and novel entities, such as anatomical theaters and archeology museums, natural science and art museums, history museums, planetariums, arboretums and aquariums, archives and house-museums, science and arts centers, ecomuseums, hospital museums, and contemporary art galleries, as well as discipline-specific collections hosted by academic departments and institutes; some special collections are hosted by the university libraries. In general, university museums and collections are classified based on disciplinary criteria or the nature of the artifacts. In Europe the number of the university museums and collections is estimated as 12,914.

== History ==
The first university museums can be traced to the medieval universities and their teaching collections to support medical education — the physic, or botanical, garden (hortus medicus) and the anatomical theatre (theatrum anatomicum). The first hortus medicus was established in Italy in either Padua or Pisa in the 1540s and the first theatrum anatomicum in Padua in 1594 for the purpose of educating both the apothecaries and doctors. In the beginning of the 17th century, anatomical theaters were established at the universities of Bologna, Ferrara, Leiden and Montpellier. There are records that document the use of Pisa's hortus medicus opened in the 1590s as a teaching museum. Soon, the teaching museum model was adopted by painters, sculptors, and architects. The cabinets of physics and chemistry followed the suit. At the University of Oxford, the picture gallery of Christ Church College was founded in 1546. In 1671, the University of Basel granted public access to the Basilius Amerbach's cabinet, which was donated by the city of Basel.

== Related organizations ==
- University Museums and Collections (UMAC) — an international association of university museums and collections.
- UNIMUSEUM - International University Museums Association
- UNIVERSEUM - European Academic Heritage Network
- Association of Academic Museums and Galleries (AAMG) - United States based organization.

== See also ==
- List of university museums in the United States
