= Nellie B. Eales =

British zoologist and university teacher (1889–1989)

- Born: 14 April 1889
- Died: 7 December 1989
- Education: University of Reading
- Occupations: Zoologist, university teacher, cataloger, scientific collector
- Employers: Marine Biological Association of the United Kingdom; University of Reading

Nellie Barbara Eales (14 April 1889 – 7 December 1989) was a British zoologist. She was a senior lecturer at the University of Reading and published research papers on a variety of zoological topics as well as a two volume catalogue on Professor F. J. Cole's extensive library. She was one of the first women in the United Kingdom to graduate with a zoological degree as well as the first woman to graduate with a doctorate from University College, Reading.

== Early life and education ==
Eales was born in 1889. In 1910, she became one of the first women in the United Kingdom to graduate with a zoological degree as well as the first woman to graduate with a doctorate from University College, Reading.

== Career ==
Eales worked at the Marine Biological Association and was appointed as curator of the University of Reading Zoological Department in 1912 . She spent her career at Reading University, progressing to the post of senior lecturer. Eales was a member of the University Senate from 1928 until 1942. She retired from her position at Reading University in 1954.

Eales's research began with cheese mites, and progressed to marine biology where she studied the sea hare and a narwhal foetus. She lectured full-time in zoology, and ran field courses at the Marine Biology Laboratory in Plymouth. She published The Littoral Fauna of Great Britain: A Handbook for Collectors in 1939, and for her students, Practical Histology and Embryology in 1940.

Eales was a fellow of the Zoological Society of London and was President of the Malacological Society of London from 1948 to 1951. She served as editor of the Proceedings of the Malacological Society from 1956 to 1969.

Having worked closely with Professor F. J. Cole, Eales was instrumental in obtaining his library of over 8000 books on early medicine and zoology for University of Reading after his death in 1959. After her retirement, she catalogued the collection, and published a two volume catalogue.

Eales died on 7 December 1989, a few months after celebrating her 100th birthday. The university offers a travel scholarship for marine biology students in her memory.
