= Damgalnuna =

Mesopotamian goddess

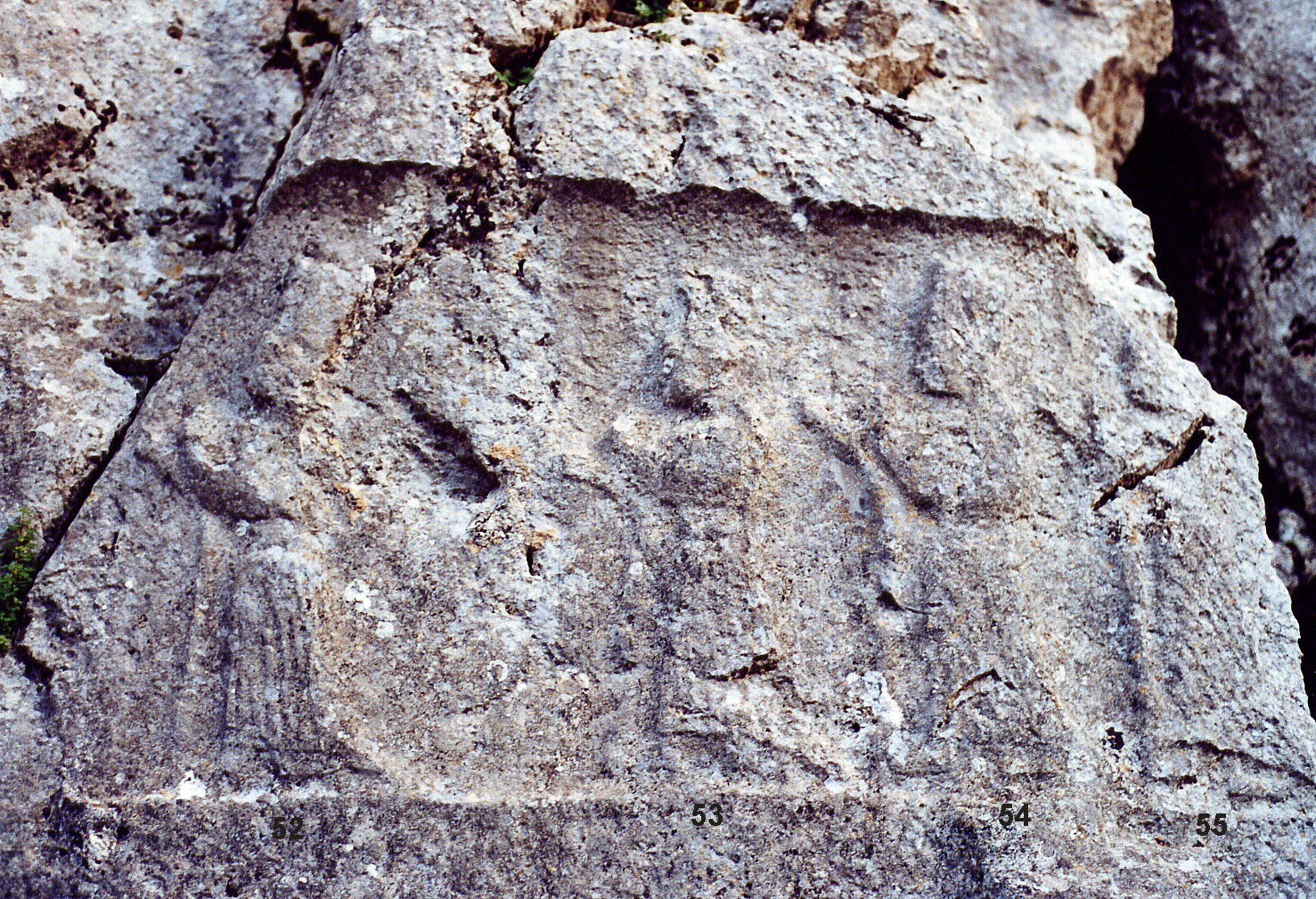
- A procession of goddesses, including Damkina (Damgalnuna), in the Yazılıkaya sanctuary.
- Other names: Damkina, Tapkina
- Major cult center: Eridu, Malgium

Genealogy
- Spouse: Enki
- Children: Nanshe, Asalluhi, Marduk, Enbilulu

Damgalnuna, also known as Damkina, was a Mesopotamian goddess regarded as the wife of the god Enki. Her character is poorly defined in known sources, though it is known that like her husband she was associated with ritual purification and that she was believed to intercede with him on behalf of supplicants. Among the deities regarded as their children were Nanshe and Asalluhi. While the myth Enki and Ninhursag treats her as interchangeable with the goddess mentioned in its title, they were usually separate from each other. The cities of Eridu and Malgium were regarded as Damgalnuna's cult centers. She was also worshiped in other settlements, such as Nippur, Sippar and Kalhu, and possibly as early as in the third millennium BCE was incorporated into the Hurrian pantheon. She appears in a number of myths, including the Enūma Eliš, though only a single composition, Damkina's Bond, is focused on her.

== Name, character and iconography ==
The theonym Damgalnuna can be translated as "the great wife of the prince," the "prince" implicitly being Enki. Joan Goodnick Westenholz pointed out that the writing of her name with the cuneiform sign NUN reflects her connection with the city of Eridu, as it was used as a logographic representation of its name. Shortened writings include ^{d}dam-gal and possibly ^{d}dam. It is agreed that the second form of her name, Damkina, developed later. In late sources it could be spelled as Damkianna. This form is attested in Neo-Babylonian letters found in Uruk, according to Paul-Alain Beaulieu originally sent from Eridu. Further variant spellings such as Damnun, Damnuna and Damgalana are also attested. The Hurrian form of the name was Tapkina.

Damgalnuna's individual character was poorly defined beyond her spousal relation with Enki. She was believed to intercede with him on behalf of human supplicants, which has been compared to an analogous role attested for Adad's wife Shala, Shamash's wife Aya, Ishum's wife Ninmug or Inanna's attendant Ninshubur. Like Enki, Damgalnuna could be associated with exorcisms and ritual purification. In incantations, she could be invoked against demons.

It has been proposed that cylinder seal depictions of a goddess accompanied by Enki's symbolic hybrids, the fish man and the fish goat, on cylinder seals who can be identified as Damgalnuna. Julia M. Asher-Greve points out that sometimes she appears in the same scenes on them as Enki. It has also been suggested that lions might have been her symbolic animals.

In Mesopotamian astronomy, Damgalnuna was identified with the constellation Wagon of Heaven, corresponding to Ursa Minor.

== Associations with other deities ==
Damgalnuna was the wife of Enki (Ea). In the myth Enki and Ninhursag, she and the eponymous goddess are treated as the same deity. However, Dina Katz points out that they were usually separate, and Ninhursag's husband was Šulpae. Deities considered to be children of Enki and Damgalnuna include Nanshe, Asalluhi, Marduk and Enbilulu.

In a variant of the Weidner god list, Damgalnuna is equated with Kiša, the wife of the river god Idlurugu. An Emesal vocabulary apparently mistakes her and her husband for the primordial deities Enki and Ninki. Despite their similar names, the two Enkis were not identical. Multiple alternate names are assigned to Damgalnuna in the god list An = Anum (tablet II, lines 173–184), including Ningikuga and Ninti. It has been argued that the latter name is also used to refer to her in the Hymn to Ninkasi, where this goddess is the mother of the eponymous beer deity. According to Antoine Cavigneaux and Manfred Krebernik, Ningikuga as a name of a spouse of Enki is to be distinguished with the use of this name to refer to the mother of Ningal or to Ningal herself.

The deities Ḫasīsu and Uznu, "wisdom" and "ear," were considered Damgalnuna's divine attendants (sukkals).

== Worship ==
The worship of Damgalnuna is attested in all periods of history of ancient Mesopotamia, though the scope of her cult gradually declined. She already appears in the Early Dynastic Zame Hymns. According to this source, her cult center was Eridu. A first millennium BCE hymn to Nanaya which lists various city goddesses also preserves information about her association with this city, though it also addresses her as the "Queen of Kullaba."

Another city considered to be Damgalnuna's cult center was Malgium, located to the south of Eshnunna. Both of her names, Damgalnuna and Damkina, appear in texts from this city. She is listed as one of its deities in the Code of Hammurabi. Two of its rulers, Takil-ilišu and Ipiq-Ishtar, referred to themselves as appointed to their position by her and Ea. The temple of the pair located in this city might have been the Enamtila, "house of life," mentioned in an inscription of Takil-ilišu.

A temple dedicated to Damgalnuna also existed in Nippur. It was built by Shulgi. A metrological text from the Middle Babylonian period also attests the existence of a house of worship which she shared with her husband, treated as separate from the former by Andrew R. George.

On Old Babylonian seals from Sippar, Damgalnuna and Enki are one of the three most commonly invoked divine couples, though they appear less frequently than Shamash and Aya or Adad and Shala. One of such objects, which belonged to a certain Enkimansum, has been inscribed with the formula "servant of Enki and Damgalnuna." They had a sanctuary in Sippar-Amnanum inside of the temple complex of Annunitum. It is known from a document stating that a number of officials, including the sanga priest of Annunitum, were responsible for inspecting its property after a theft occurred.

An inscription with Ashurnasirpal II indicates that Damgalnuna also shared a temple with her husband in Kalhu.

=== Hurrian reception ===
Damgalnuna was incorporated into Hurrian religion, where she similarly fulfilled the role of Ea's wife. According to Piotr Taracha, it is possible the transfer of her cult occurred in the third millennium BCE already. She is mentioned in the treaty between Šattiwaza and Šuppiluliuma I, in which she appears near the end of the list of divine witnesses, between Belet-ekalli and Išḫara. She is among the deities depicted in the Yazılıkaya sanctuary, where she appears in a procession of goddesses, between Shalash and Nikkal. She was also worshiped alongside other Hurrian deities in the Hittite capital, Hattusa, and in Nerik.

== Mythology ==
Only a single myth in which Damgalnuna plays a central role is known. She appears in it under the name Damkianna, though it has been suggested that in this context it might refer to Zarpanit. The text is known from two copies, one Neo-Assyrian and another Neo-Babylonian or later. Two translations have been published so far, one by Takayoshi Oshima and another by Wilfred G. Lambert, who gave it the title Damkina's Bond. Based on the fact that Marduk is already presented as a king of the gods, but at the same time Nabu is his scribe rather than son, the latter author assumed that it was originally composed under the rule of either the Kassite or Isin II dynasty. The former concludes it cannot be earlier than the reign of Nebuchadnezzar I. Based on the available evidence for the association between Damgalnuna and Malgium, Lambert suggested it originated in this city. The myth focuses on a conflict between the pantheons of Babylon and Nippur, led respectively by Marduk and Enlil, though its details are uncertain. The forces of Nippur lose, and the conflict is eventually resolved through Damgalnuna's intervention, prompted by a message about the battle delivered to her by Neretagmil, the sukkal of the god Nāru. Lambert argued that to that end, she released an object referred to as a "bond" (il-let-sa) in his translation, the nature of which is left unstated but which according to him was something possible to display, perhaps a clay tablet. Oshima instead refers to it as a "burden" and concludes that it might have been some sort of plague or natural disaster. The colophon of the Neo-Babylonian copy states that the contents of the tablet were a secret and revealing them to anyone from outside its intended audience of ancient scholars was considered a taboo of Marduk.

Damgalnuna appears in Enūma Eliš as Marduk's mother. However, the text provides her with no genealogy, and no account of her birth is included. The form of her name used in this text is Damkina.

According to Nathan Wasserman, one of the inscriptions of king Ipiq-Ishtar of Malgium might contain a reference to a flood myth involving Ea (Enki) and Damkina (Damgalnuna). It states that when an unspecified disaster was about to befall this city, Ea instructed his wife to save it by "insuring long dynastic kingship," which according to Raphael Kutscher should be understood as a euphemism for placing an usurper on the throne.

A hymn dedicated to Damgalnuna, identified in a subscript as a šir-šag-ḫula ("song of a joyful heart"), is also known. It focuses on her spousal relation to Enki.
