= Enki =

God in Sumerian mythology

Enki 𒀭𒂗𒆠
- God of subterranean fresh waters, wisdom, crafts, magic and incantations
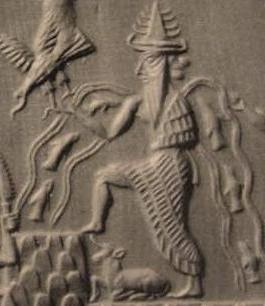
- Detail of Enki from the Adda Seal, an ancient Akkadian cylinder seal dating to circa 2,300 BCE
- Other names: Ea, Nudimmud, Nagbu, Niššīku
- Major cult center: Eridu, Malgium, Babylon
- Abode: Abzu
- Symbol: Ram-headed staff, goat-fish, turtle, ibex
- Number: 40

Genealogy
- Parents: An (father); Nammu or Urash (mother)
- Siblings: Enlil (in Enki and the World order); Ninmah (in Enki and Ninmah); Ishkur (in some texts)
- Consort: Damgalnuna; Ninhursag (in Enki and Ninhursag through syncretism with Damgalnuna); Ningikuga (in one tradition); Ninti (in the Hymn to Ninkasi)
- Children: several, including Nanshe, Asalluhi, Marduk and Enbilulu

Equivalents
- Ugaritic: Kothar-wa-Khasis
- Hurrian: Eyan
- Elamite: Napirisha
- Greek: Kronos possibly Prometheus possibly Poseidon

Enki (Sumerian: 𒀭𒂗𒆠 ^{d}EN-KI), also known as Ea (Akkadian: 𒀭𒂍𒀀 ^{d}E₂-A), was the Mesopotamian god of wisdom, crafts, fresh subterranean waters, magic, and incantations. He was believed to rule the Abzû. In Mesopotamian astronomy, he was associated with the stars of the southern band of the sky. Enki's wife was Damgalnuna, and their children included Nanshe, Asalluhi, Marduk and Enbilulu. His sukkal (attendant deity) was Isimud. Servants of the god included lahmu, kulullû, and the Seven Sages.

Enki was first worshipped in Sumer. The earliest sources associate him with the city of Eridu, which was his main cult center, and regarded as his home. His temple there was the E-Abzû. He was already a major deity at the time of the earliest written sources, and the influence of his cult spread outside of Southern Mesopotamia early on. It is uncertain when Enki was fully assimilated to Ea, a god whose name is of unknown, but possibly semitic origin. They were already syncretized with each other in parts of Babylonia in the second half of the third millennium BCE.

The cult of Enki/Ea was particularly influential in the Ur III and Old Babylonian Periods, where he became part of a triad at the top of the pantheon consisting of Anu, Enlil and himself. In the latter period, his cult is attested in almost all of the important cities of Babylonia.

Enki/Ea was also incorporated into Hurrian religion as a major god, with identical character and functions as in Mesopotamia. His cult spread into Anatolia, possibly as early as the third millennium BCE, and he became part of the Hittite pantheon. With the rise of Babylon and its patron god Marduk, Enki/Ea's cult lost importance, though he still remained a major god in first millennium BCE Babylonia. His cult is also attested in Assyria during this period, in the cities of Assur, Nineveh and Kalhu.

Enki/Ea's primary symbols included the goat-fish, the ram-headed staff and the turtle. In art, he was commonly depicted with water streams flowing from his body, or holding a vase from which water flows.

Enki/Ea frequently appears in Mesopotamian myths in the role of a crafty counsellor who finds solutions to difficult problems. Mesopotamian tradition regarded him as the creator of humankind from clay. Several Mesopotamian myths deal with the story of the creation of humankind. In Enki and Ninmah, Enki comes up with the plan to fashion the new being, meant to take over the labour of the gods. In Atra-hasis, Enki works with Belet-ili to create man from clay and divine blood. The advice he gives to his human protegee later allows humanity to survive Enlil's attempts to wipe it out, which culminate in the sending of the flood. In the later Babylonian Epic of Creation, the creation of man is instead explained as a collaboration between Ea and his son Marduk.

Enki/Ea is a supporting character in the Kumarbi cycle, where he plays the role of a problem solver and kingmaker.

== Names ==
The meaning of the names Enki and Ea is uncertain. It is agreed that they were originally separate deities, though it is unclear when they were fully equated with each other. According to Alfonso Archi, syncretism between them already existed in the pre-Sargonic period in parts of Babylonia.

=== Enki ===
The name Enki is usually translated as "Lord of the Earth" in Sumerian. This explanation is not universally accepted. Some scholars argue that it does not seemingly fit the functions of the god, and have proposed that Enki could have been an epithet of the deity that eventually replaced his original name. Despite the similarity between their names, Enki of Eridu and the primordial god Enki were separate figures. Thorkild Jacobsen proposed that their names had slightly different meanings and he translated the name of the primordial god as "Lord Earth". The forms of their names in the Emesal dialect are different; the name of Enki of Eridu is written Amanki, while the name of the primordial god is written Umunki.

Edmond Sollberger and Wilfred G. Lambert have proposed a different translation for the name of Enki of Eridu. It has been remarked that an omissible g appears at the end of the second element of his name, which does not appear in the name of the primordial god. For this reason they interpret this second element not as ki, "earth", but as ki(g) of unknown meaning. Sollberger understood an element ki(g) meaning "favour, benevolence, love" in Sumerian. Therefore, he translated Enki(g) as "Lord Love" or "Lord Benevolence". He argues that this translation reflects Enki's well-attested role in myths as a friend of humankind. However, this explanation is not generally accepted. It has been remarked that it is possible that the omissible g developed via dissimilation, though similar examples of dissimilation are so far not attested in Sumerian.

=== Ea ===
The name Ea first occurs in personal names from the Old Akkadian period. Earlier translations interpreting Ea as a Sumerian name meaning "House of Water" or "House of the Moon" are regarded as implausible by modern scholarship. In a few modern publications, the interpretation "House of Water" is sometimes presented as a scribal popular etymology. However, according to Lambert, there is no evidence for such a reinterpretation.

Due to the fact that the name appears associated with Semitic elements in the sources of the Old Akkadian Period, it has been suggested that Ea is most likely a Semitic name. It has been proposed that the etymology of the name is connected to the Semitic root ḥyy, to live. This explanation has not been proved with certainty, though it is considered plausible. Miguel Civil proposed that the name of the god Haya was originally an alternative spelling of Ea. Margaret W. Green proposed that the names Ea and Haya were both derived from the name of a pre Sumerian deity that was integrated into the pantheons of the Sumerians and of the Semitic peoples, and that Haya persisted as a separate deity after Ea was syncretized with Enki. The hypothesis of a connection between the names Ea and Haya is considered to be credible, but it is not proved, and it is not accepted by all scholars.

== Alternative names and epithets ==
=== Nudimmud ===
Nudimmud, one of the most frequently attested alternative names and epithets of Enki/Ea, was almost exclusively used in literary texts. In Akkadian sources, it could also appear in royal inscriptions, prayers, and incantations. It already appears in the Zame Hymns under the form ^{d}en-nu-te-mud. The standard writing was ^{d}nu-dím-mud. Earlier spellings include nu-te-me-nud from the Fāra period or nu-da-mud from the Ur III period. The verbal elements dím and mud in the standard orthography respectively mean "to build, create", and "to bring forth". The god list An=Anum ša ameli explains Nudimmud as Ea in his aspect as the god of creation. Jacobsen interpreted the name as "Image fashioner", "God of shaping", reflecting Ea's role as the god of crafts and as the god who creates figures from clay. The meaning of Nudimmud in the older periods is unclear. Antoine Cavigneaux and Manfred Krebernik remark that the standard orthography with dím and its translation likely reflect a later etymological reinterpretation of the name.

=== Nagbu ===
Nagbu, "Source, spring", was an alternative name of Enki/Ea which reflected his role as the lord of the springs and subterranean waters. In this aspect he was not only connected to irrigation and fertility, but he was also associated with the art of incantation, as subterranean water played an important role in Mesopotamian magic and incantation rituals. Nagbu is attested chiefly in sources from Babylonia, and in the Neo Babylonian period, the name often appears in incantation texts. It was written with the logogram ^{d}IDIM. This logogram already appears as a theophoric element in Akkadian and Neo Sumerian names. Starting from the second millennium BCE it often appears in Babylonian personal names. In the god list An=Anum, Nagbu is equated with Ea. It is unclear whether Nagbu was originally an independent deity or an aspect of Ea.

=== Niššīku ===
Niššīku was an alternative name and epithet of Enki/Ea of uncertain meaning. It is first attested in literary texts of the Old Babylonian period. Wilfred G. Lambert and Alan R. Millard propose that the name was derived from the Semitic element nasīku, "chieftain", reflecting Enki's Sumerian epithet nun, ''prince'', ''leader''. Hannes D. Galter considers that a connection between an Old Babylonian expression and a loanword from Aramaic is implausible. Alternative spellings of the name include Naššīku and Ninšīku. Ninšīku is likely a later folk etymology from Sumerian. It is attested from the Middle Babylonian period onwards. One god list explains Ninšīku as Ea in his aspect as god of wisdom. In this interpretation, -šiku was likely equated with Sumerian kù-zu, "wise".

=== DIŠ ===
The logogram DIŠ often designates Enki/Ea in Assyrian texts. In Neo Assyrian sources, it chiefly appears in royal inscriptions and incantation literature. It is sometimes attested as a theophoric element in personal names of the first millennium. In Neo Babylonian Uruk it designates Anu instead. The reading of DIŠ in akkadian is unknown. Galter suggests that DIŠ was possibly a numeral symbolizing the number 60, a number associated with Anu, and that its use for Ea could have been a way to equate him with the supreme god of the pantheon.

=== Other names and epithets ===
Enki/Ea had a variety of other names and epithets reflecting his different functions and his association with his abode, Abzû, and his cult center, Eridu. Galter remarks that the majority of other names of Ea are only documented from sources from the late second millennium, and therefore he presumes that they represent an effort to fully encompass and describe all of the aspects of the god. Craftsmanship deities such as Uttu and Ninagal could be regarded as alternative names of Ea in late sources.

The majority of Akkadian epithets of Ea reflect his role as the god of wisdom. Such epithets include for example, bēl nēmeqi ("Lord of wisdom"), bēl tašīmti ("Lord of understanding"), and apkal ilī ("Sage of the gods"). Bēl nagbi ("Lord of the subterranean waters") was a frequently attested epithet of Ea in his aspect as a water god. He could be referred to as bēl tenēšēti, "Lord of mankind". His association to the arts of incantation was reflected in his epithets mašmaš ilī, "Exorcist of the gods", and bēl išīputti ("Lord of the purification rites").

Ea could be referred to as Ea-šarru in some Akkadian texts. According to Galter, it is unclear whether Ea-šarru was simply an epithet of Ea or if a foreign deity was identified with Ea and šarru, "king", was added to distinguish them. He remarks that the earliest attestations of this name occur outside of Mesopotamia, which could indicate that the name did not originate in the region.

A common epithet of Enki/Ea in literary texts was Enlil-banda, "the junior Enlil". An early attestation of this epithet dates to the Old Babylonian Period. Several possible interpretations of this name have been suggested by scholars. It could indicate that Ea was regarded as a younger brother of Enlil, it could have been a way to equate Ea with Enlil, it could have been a way to assert that he is "like Enlil" in his domain, or it could mean that he received his functions and abode from Enlil.

The god could be referred to as the king of the Abzû and the king of Eridu. Another of his epithets was dàra-abzu, translated as Ibex or Stag of the Abzû. An early attestation of this byname is found in an Old Babylonian hymn. Several compound bynames of Enki/Ea formed with the element dàra appear in a later god list.

== Character and attributes ==
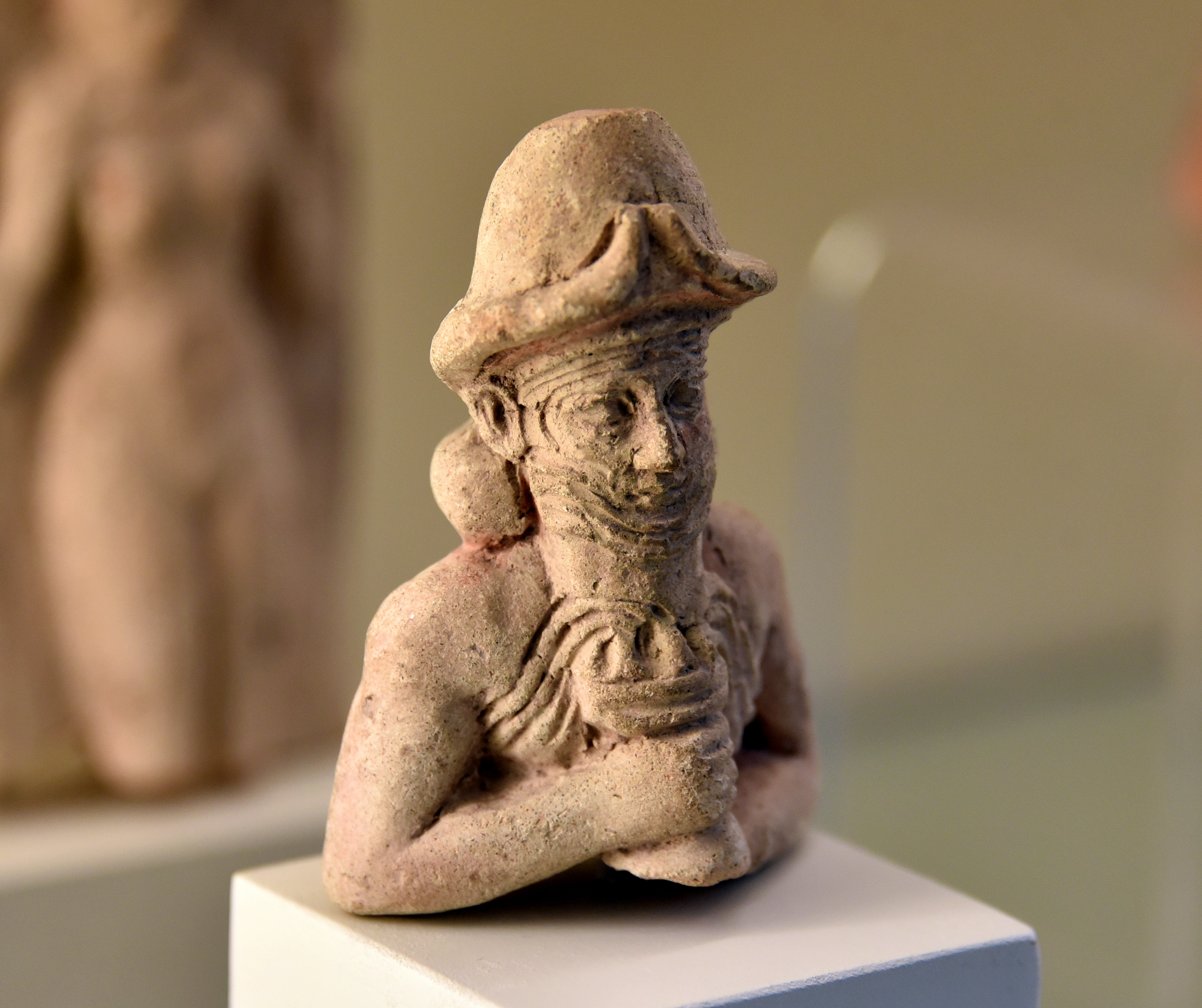
Old Babylonian (19th–17th century BCE) statue of Ea holding a vessel with flowing waters. Pergamon Museum.

Enki/Ea was worshipped as the god of wisdom, arts, crafts, fresh subterranean waters, springs, and by extension incantations and magic. He also had the function of a creator god. He was believed to reside in the Abzû, imagined as an under-earth fresh water region.

Enki/Ea's association with wisdom is already attested from Sumerian sources of the pre-Sargonic period. He was believed to be able to grant it to both humans and gods. Curse formulas invoking him could similarly ask him to take away the wisdom and intellect of an enemy. He was also connected to the determination of fate. A Neo-Babylonian text refers to him as the king of destinies. The nature of the wisdom connected to Enki/Ea has been described by modern scholars as practical skill, cunning or craftiness. In Mesopotamian mythology, he often uses guile or magic to turn situations to his advantage, and gives his advice to both gods and men. He could be referred to as the one "who knows the hearts of the great gods". Though he is the protagonist of only a few of the preserved Mesopotamian myths, he is one of the deities that intervenes most often in them. In the Agushaya hymn, he devises a plan to calm the heart of the warlike Ishtar, crafting a double of her from clay to be her adversary. In Ninurta and the turtle, he outwits the warrior god who was plotting against him. In the Adapa myth, his instructions allow Adapa to ingratiate himself with three gods. Some scholars have described the god's behaviour in some myths as similar to that of a trickster figure. In one of these myths, Enki is bound by an oath not to reveal to humanity the gods plan to wipe them out with a flood, but he warns his human protege by pretending to speak to a reed wall.

As the god of arts and crafts Enki/Ea could be invoked to assist with building projects. In later periods, through his assimilation of initially distinct minor craftsmanship deities, he was identified as the patron of craft professions such as weavers, blacksmiths, and builders, but also of agricultural professions such as goatherds and gardeners, as well as professions such as musicians, lamentation priests (kalû) and scribes.

Enki/Ea was believed to be typically a benevolent deity. Mesopotamian tradition regarded him as the god responsible for the creation of humans from clay. In the Šurpu incantation series, he is referred to as the god "whose hands created mankind". This process of creation has been compared to the work of a craftsman. In myths predating the Enuma Elish, Enki works together with a mother goddess (Ninmah, Belet-ili) to fashion the new being, and in the Enuma Elish, its creation is the product of Ea's collaboration with his son Marduk. In the Mesopotamian flood myth, he gives advice to his mortal protege which allows humanity to survive Enlil's attempts to wipe it out. In Sumerian texts, such as the myth Enki and the World Order, he is depicted as the god responsible for the organization of the earth. In the myth Inanna and Enki, he is depicted as the guardian of the me-s, fundamental powers and decrees of the gods which enable the functioning of human civilization.

As the god of the underground sweet waters and springs, Enki/Ea was believed to ensure the prosperity of the land by allowing sufficient irrigation. He was also believed to be able to deny access to fresh water, and could be invoked for that purpose in curses. Ea could be also connected to river water, though the river itself was worshipped as a separate deity, Id. He was one of the deities that could be invoked in relation to the river ordeal. In Sumerian, the same sign was used to designate water and semen. Sumerian literature about Enki could be explicit; the myth Enki and Ninhursag features sexual encounters between the god and several goddesses, and in Enki and the World Order he creates the waters of the Tigris by filling the river with his semen. This portrayal of the god has been contrasted with the one of Akkadian texts where Ea chiefly appears in his role as a crafty counsellor.

Enki/Ea also appears as one of the most important gods in incantation texts. Groundwater was believed to have purifying and healing properties, and because of this it played a major role in incantations and magic. Enki/Ea was invoked for a broad variety of purposes, including exorcism, purification, curing physical ailments, house building, and appeasing gods and demons. A common Mesopotamian incantation narrative, dubbed the Asalluhi-Enki or Marduk-Ea formula, describes a dialogue between Enki and his son Asalluhi (Marduk in the Akkadian version). Asalluhi comes across a problem that he cannot solve, and asks Enki for help. Enki tells Asalluhi that he knows everything that his father knows, but still proceeds to instruct him in the course of action to take. This formula already existed in the Early Dynastic Period, as attested by an incantation to counter snake bite.

The Mesopotamians divided the sky into three zones assigned to the gods Anu, Enlil, and Ea. They associated Ea with the stars nearest to the equator, while those near the poles were assigned to Enlil, and the central stars to Anu. This division of the sky is first attested in the thirteenth century BCE.

== Symbols and iconography ==
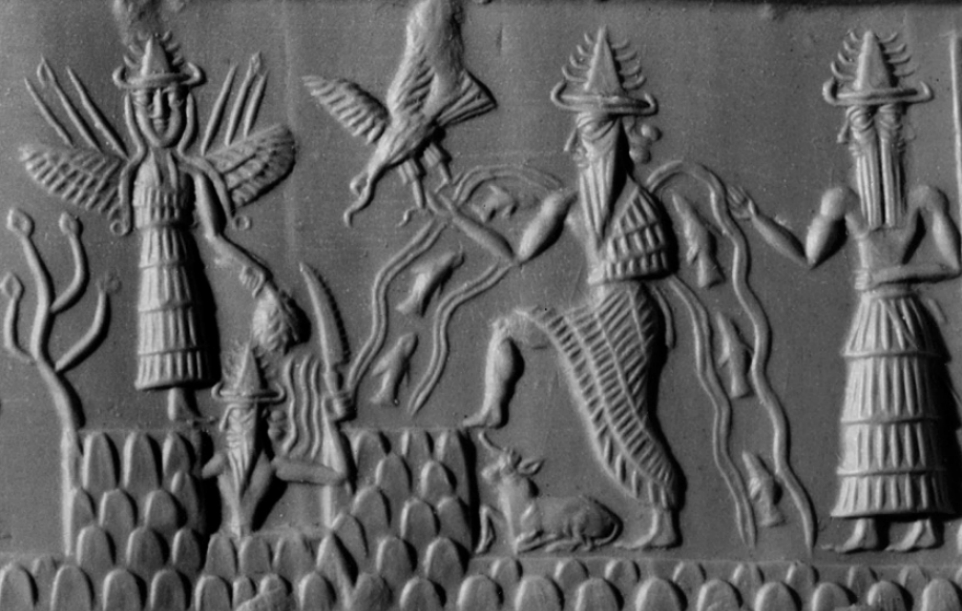
Detail of the Adda Seal, an ancient Akkadian cylinder seal (circa 2300 BCE) depicting Enki with water streams coming from his shoulders. British Museum.

Enki/Ea is considered one of the few Mesopotamian deities with a recognizable iconography. His most distinguishing features are water streams flowing from his body, often accompanied by fish swimming in the water. These features are first attested in the Old Akkadian Period. Enki's iconography in the older periods is uncertain. It has been proposed that he is depicted on an Early Dynastic seal representing a sitting god with two fish beneath his feet, though this identification is not universally accepted. Enki/Ea's water streams could be depicted as coming from his shoulders or his hips, or he could be depicted sitting within his shrine or abode, with the streams surrounding it in the shape of a rectangle. Additionally, he could often be depicted with water sprouting vessels, carrying them either on his shoulders, in his hand or above his hand.

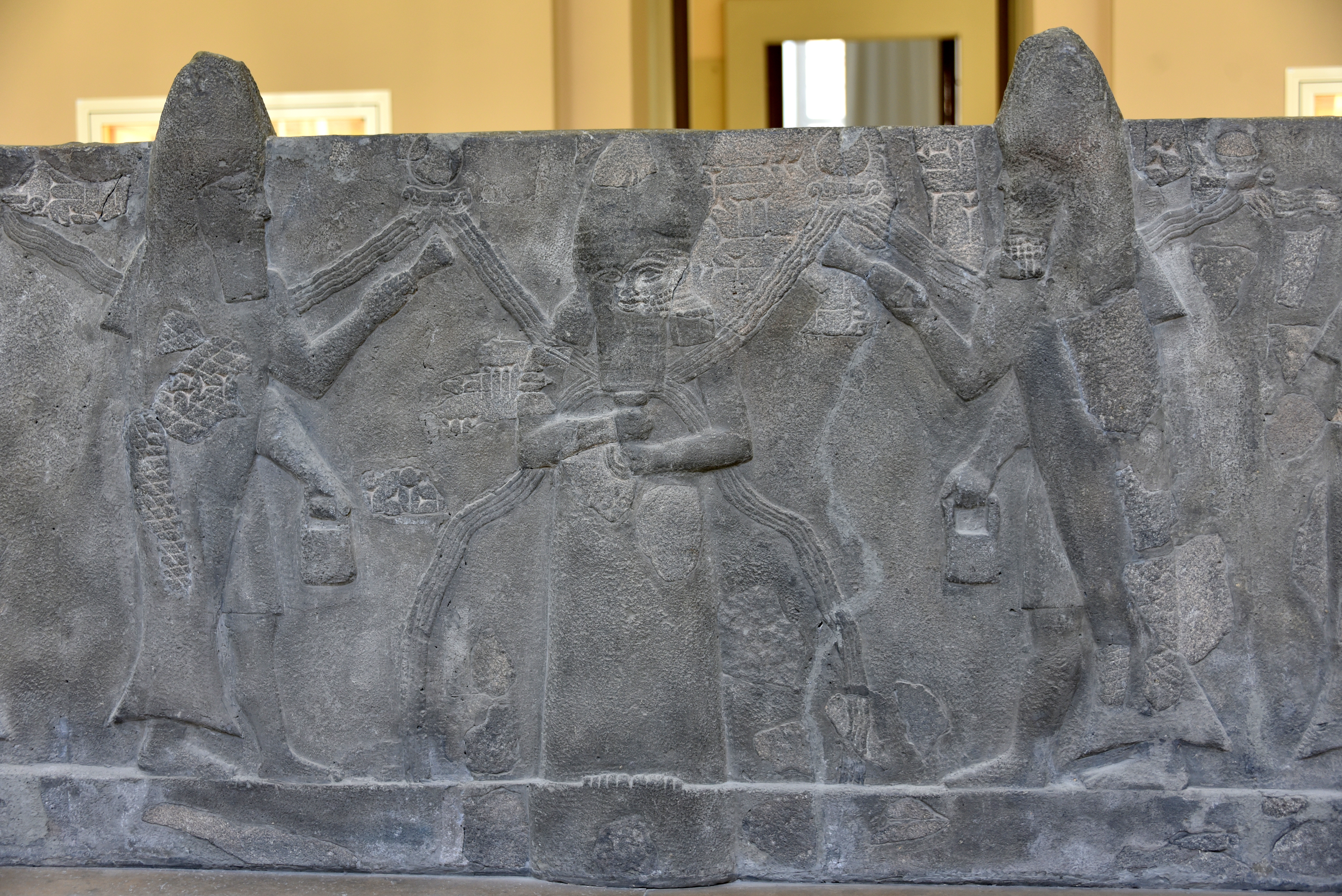
Ea flanked by fish-cloaked apkallus. 7th century BCE. Pergamon Museum.

His emblems include the goat-fish and the ram-headed staff. They were often depicted together, for example on kudurrus. The kudurru of Nazi-Maruttash refers to them as "the great emblems of Ea". The ram-headed staff is attested in art from the Old Babylonian period until the Achaemenid period. In Neo Assyrian seals, Ea is sometimes represented carrying a crook, which Jeremy Black and Anthony Green suggest may be a symbolic representation of the staff. The goat-fish is attested in mesopotamian art from the Neo Sumerian period until Hellenistic times, and it was later adopted into roman art. It is at the origin of the zodiacal constellation Capricorn. Ea could often be represented sitting or standing on it. While the goat-fish's connection to Ea is well attested, it could also be depicted as a general apotropaic figure, not attached to any god. Clay figurines of goat-fishes could be used in apotropaic magic.

Another symbol of Ea was the turtle. It was associated with him since the Old Akkadian period. On kudurrus it could be used as his symbol instead of the goat-fish with the ram-headed staff, or it could be represented on the back of the goat-fish.

Ea was often depicted alongside his two faced vizier Isimud. Since the Old Akkadian period he could also be depicted alongside his Lahmu servants, divinities represented as naked or kilted male figures with abundant facial hair and locks of hair on each side of their face. On cylinder seals they could be represented as his doorkeepers, holding a gate-post, or in later periods a spade. Another figure closely associated with Ea in pictorial representations is the fish-man, who has the upper body of a man and the lower body of a fish. It was depicted next to symbols of Ea. It is attested in pictorial representations from the Neo Sumerian period up until Hellenistic times, and might have been the precursor of the merman in Greek and Medieval European art and literature.

In Akkadian period seals, Ea was depicted in various scenes, some of which likely have a mythological background. A well known example is the seal of Adda. There he is depicted with one foot on a mountain, with water streams coming out of his shoulders, and fish swimming in them. An ibex or a bull is seated beneath his right foot. An eagle descends from above to the center of the scene. Ea's two-faced vizier stands behind him. The god rising from the mountain is most often interpreted as Shamash, and the armed goddess as Ishtar. Another well attested example is a motif where a half-man, half-bird creature is presented before an enthroned Ea by one or two gods, one of which is generally Isimud. Various interpretations of these scenes have been proposed by scholars. Pierre Amiet proposed that the scene on the Adda cylinder may represent the revelation of the forces of nature in early spring. Kramer and Maier proposed that the scene of the "bird-man" led before the god of streams could be derived from the Anzû myth, representing the return of the tablets of destinies to Enki after the defeat of the Anzû bird who had stolen them, as in the Sumerian version of the myth he was their guardian, while in the akkadian version they were stolen from Enlil instead. However, since only a few, difficult to understand myths are preserved from this period, the narrative behind the scenes remains uncertain. Ea could also be depicted travelling on his boat. According to one text, the name of the boat was "Ibex of the Abzû". Enki's association with the ibex dates to the second half of the third millennium.

The little owl is called the bird of Ea in the Bird Call Text.

== Relations with other deities ==
=== Parents ===
The sky god An is named as the father of Enki in multiple sources, including the myth Enki and the World order and Enuma Elish. In a balbale to Enki by Ishme-Dagan, the parents of Enki are An and a commonly attested wife of his, Urash.

The creator goddess Nammu was regarded as the mother of Enki in the tradition of Eridu. She is attested in this role in the myth Enki and Ninmah, the god list An=Anum, and late incantations. In Enki and Ninmah, she provides the incentive for her son to devise the creation of humankind. It has been remarked that Nammu and An do not appear together in Sumerian or Akkadian literature, and only a single inscription refers to them as a couple. Galter points out that this might indicate two separate traditions for Enki's lineage. While Leick presumes An and Nammu together are Enki's parents, Black, Green and Lambert keep the traditions separate. Lambert remarks that mentions of An as Enki's father are more common than the tradition where Nammu is his mother, and presumes that Enki's birth in this second tradition was imagined as a result of parthenogenesis.

=== Siblings ===
In the myth Enki and the World Order, Enki names Enlil as his older brother. It has been further proposed that Enki's well attested epithet Enlil-banda, "Junior Enlil", could possibly reflect a tradition according to which Enki was regarded a younger brother of Enlil, though it is only one of the possible explanations for this epithet.

In the myth Enki and Ninmah, Enki calls Ninmah his sister.

In some texts praising the weather-god Ishkur, Enki is referred to as his twin brother. However, such a connection does not appear in texts focusing on Enki. According to Daniel Schwemer, this is explained by the difference in rank between them, as there would be no incentive for naming Ishkur, a lower ranking deity, as the twin of Enki in texts dedicated to the higher ranking god.

=== Consort ===
Enki/Ea's spouse was Damgalnuna (also known as Damkina). She was believed to act as an intermediary between her husband and supplicants.

In the myth Enki and Ninhursag, Ninhursag instead appears as Enki's consort. In this context, she was syncretized with Damgalnuna.

Ningikuga was the name of a goddess regarded as a wife of Enki. In tablet II of the god list An=Anum she is equated with Damgalnuna. Ningikuga was also the name of the mother of Ningal. According to Jacobsen, this name refers to a single deity, while they are treated as separate goddesses in Ningikuga's Reallexikon der Assyriologie entry by Cavigneaux and Krebernik.

=== Children ===
Marduk, from a cylinder seal of the 9th century BCE.

Marduk, the tutelary god of Babylon, was regarded as the son of Enki/Ea and Damgalnuna. He could be referred to as Ea's first-born son and heir. The earliest documented sources attesting to the tradition where Enki is Marduk's father date to the Old Babylonian Period. In this period, Marduk was assimilated to Asalluhi, a god of incantations who was regarded as a son of Enki and Damgalnuna. The syncretism between Asalluhi and Marduk is documented at the earliest in a letter of the king of Larsa Sin-Iddinam, where he is referred to as "Asalluhi, king of Babylon". An hymn from the Old Babylonian period addresses Asalluhi as the first born son of Enki and as Marduk. The syncretism between Asalluhi and Marduk was not fully complete in the Old Babylonian period, however, and they could still be occasionally referred to as separate deities. With the rise of Babylon Marduk's importance in the pantheon grew and he took over certain characteristics of his father, such as his function as organizer of the earth. In Enuma Elish, Ea is depicted as rejoicing over his son's new status as king of the gods, and attributing to him his name and offices.

Nanshe was regarded as the daughter of Enki and Damgalnuna. According to Gebhard Selz, the tradition of Enki being the father of Nanshe likely already existed in Early Dynastic Lagash. She could appear alongside him in sumerian and bilingual incantation texts, together with Asalluhi and Nammu. Several scholars argue that Nanshe's brother Ningirsu, usually regarded as a son of Enlil, was originally also regarded as a son of Enki.

Enbilulu could be regarded as a son of Enki and Damgalnuna; in the myth Enlil and Ninlil he is instead the son of the eponymous deities.

In the Hymn to Ninkasi, the eponymous goddess is Enki's daughter with Ninti. The hymn further states that she was raised by Ninhursag. It has been proposed that in the context of this hymn Ninti is an alternative name of Damgalnuna. In the god list An=Anum Ninti is equated with this goddess.

Ea is referred to as the father of Dumuzi (Tammuz) in Old Babylonian incantations, though he does not play a role in the narratives about this god.

A fragmentary literary text identifies Numushda as a son of Enki, though he was usually regarded as a son of Nanna.

The incantation goddess Ningirima could be regarded as a daughter of Enki/Ea, but in another tradition she was instead the sister of Enlil.

In the god list An=Anum, Ea is assigned several sons aside from Marduk; Dumuzi-abzu, Barra, Barragula, Burnuntasa, Nera, and Kigulla. Kigulla also appears elsewhere as a goddess, the wife of Nita, equated with Ninurta. Dumuzi-abzu was originally the name of a female deity from the region of Lagash who was not referred to as Enki's child in older sources. Akiko Tsujita has proposed that she was reinterpreted as his son due to a confusion with the similarly named Dumuzi (Tammuz). Ḫedimmeku appears as the only daughter of Enki/Ea in An=Anum. She is otherwise twice referred to as "the daughter of Abzu" in incantations, and in the Šurpu incantation series she appears near him.

In a section of the myth Enki and Ninhursag depicting a succession of incestuous couplings between Enki and his descendants, the goddesses Ninšar, Ninkurra, in one variant Ninimma, and Uttu appear as Enki's daughters. It is unclear why its author chose these goddesses for their respective roles. At the end of the myth, eight more deities are born from the ill body parts of Enki; Abu, Ninsikila, Ningirietud, Ninkasi, Nazi, Azimua, Ninti and Ensag. Their names are reinterpreted as word play on the Sumerian words referring to his body parts.

Uttu could also be regarded as a daughter of Enki/Ea in other contexts; she is named as such in an incantation ritual, though one text attests that she could also be regarded as a daughter of Anu. In the god list An=Anu ša amēli, which probably originated in the Kassite period, and reflects syncretistic tendencies, she is instead identified as a manifestation of Ea, alongside other deities associated with professions and crafts. In an incantation text, Ea fashions from clay several craftsmanship deities, among them Ninšar and Ninkurra. As the god of crafts, Enki/Ea was connected to the various craftsmanship deities, though the nature of their relation varies depending on the source.

=== Court ===
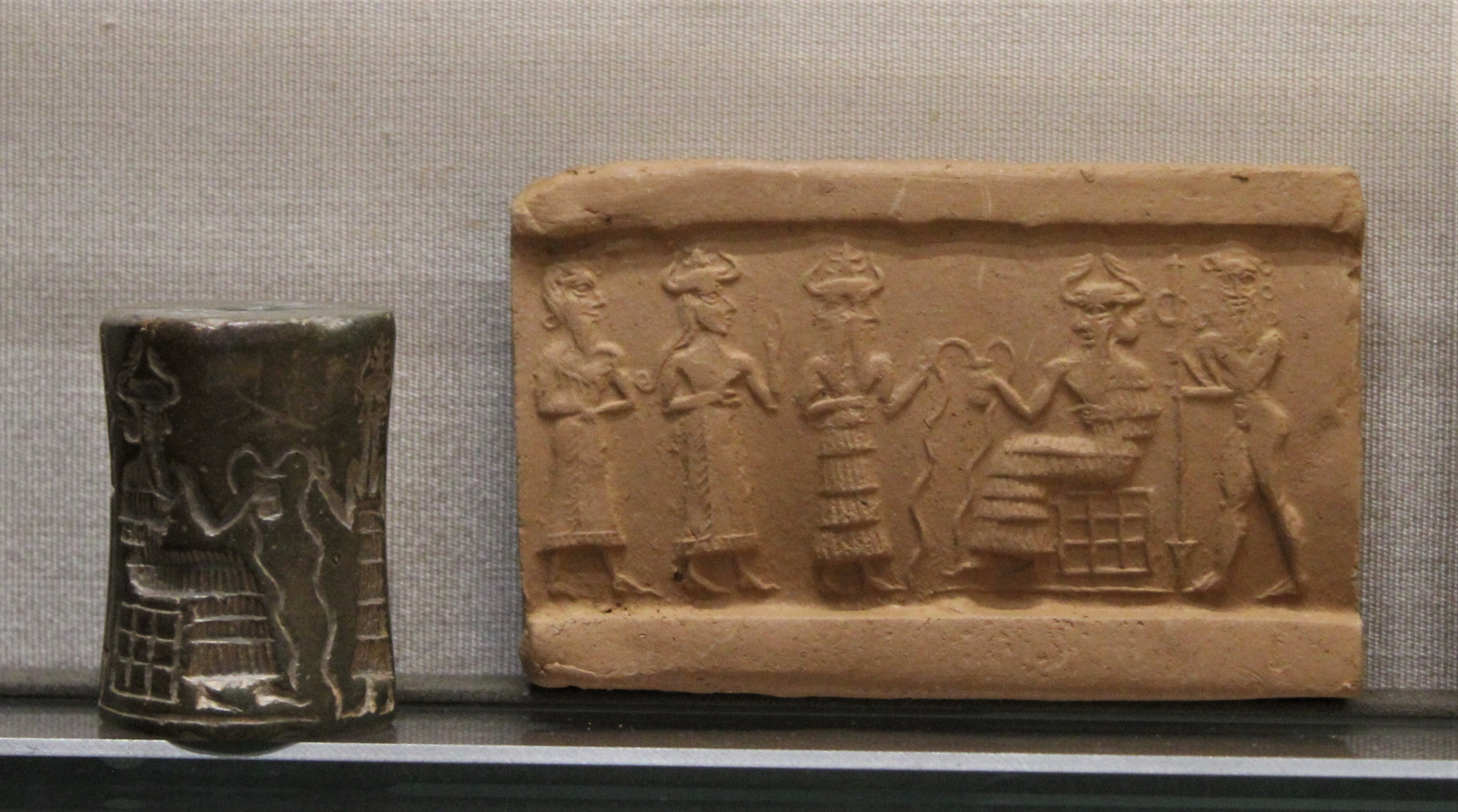
Akkadian cylinder seal depicting the enthroned Enki accompanied by a Lahmu holding a gate-post, and his two faced vizier Isimud, who introduces a personal goddess leading the owner of the seal.

Enki/Ea's sukkal was Isimud, who was characteristically depicted with two faces in Mesopotamian art. It has been argued that the name Ara, which could be used as an alternative name of Isimud from the Old Babylonian Period onwards, initially belonged to a distinct goddess who was also an attendant of Enki.

Sirsir was a deity of the circle of Enki that could be regarded as his boatman, and in later periods, be identified as an aspect of Enki or his son Marduk. Kaḫegal ("mouth of prosperity") and Igiḫegal ("eye or face of prosperity") were two divinities regarded as doorkeepers of Enki, usually paired together in sources. They are attested in this role since Old Babylonian times onwards, and appear in association with Enki and Eridu in incantations. The god-list An=Anum names them among the doorkeepers of Enki, who are there numbered to be eight. A later text refers to Kaḫegal and Igiḫegal as lahmu of Eridu or the Abzû.

One sumerian text of Middle Babylonian origin refers to the goat-fish (suḫurmāšu), a supernatural being well attested as an emblem of Enki/Ea, as the "lofty purification priest of the Abzû".

Lahmu were a class of supernatural beings regarded as servants of Ea, and later of his son Marduk. They were associated with water. They were believed to reside in Ea's subterranean domain and act as doorkeepers of his temple. Certain texts number fifty Lahmu at Ea's service. Lahmu could be depicted in art as a male, long haired figure usually with six or four curls, either naked or wearing a girdle. This figure is sometimes referred to as "nude hero" or "wild man" by art historians. The so-called Göttertypentext edited by F. Köcher mentions supernatural creatures in the service of Ea also referred to as "lahmu". Their appearances are varied, combining the body parts of fish, humans, and other animals. According to Wiggermann, the usage of the term "lahmu" in the Göttertypentext represents an evolution from the original meaning of the word and that here it was used to refer to newly invented categories of creatures.

The kulullû, or fish-man, was also a class of supernatural beings who could be associated with Enki/Ea. The Göttertypentext refers to the kulullû as a creature of this god. In art this being was depicted with a human upper half and the lower body of a fish. Textual evidence instead describes the kulullû as a being with the head of an unidentified creature, the kissugu, the upper body of a human and the lower body of a carp.

The Seven Sages (apkallu) were fish-men creatures of the Abzû regarded as responsible for teaching humankind various aspects of human culture, in a Babylonian and Assyrian tradition dating to the late second and the first millennium BCE. They are described as servants of Ea in the Epic of Erra, and are called "the Seven Sages of Eridu" in a text from the first millennium BCE known as the Twenty One Poultices. Mesopotamian traditions around the Seven Sages were the source for the later Babyloniaca of the Babylonian priest Berossos, which relates that a hybrid fish-human creature named Oannes came out of the sea to teach the inhabitants of Babylonia various aspects of human culture, such as writing, temple building and sciences. The Seven Sons of the Abzû are servants of Ea which appear in incantations, and who were concerned with the purifying of water and curing of sicknesses. It is presumed that they are identical with the Seven Sages.

A connection between Ea and the South Wind is documented in texts; Essarhadon refers to her as the breeze of this god, and in an Assyrian incantation she is called "the beloved of Ea".

=== Enki/Ea and foreign deities ===
In an Assyrian incantation series, Enki/Ea is identified with the Elamite god Napirisha, who might have shared with him an association with underground waters. In Elam, Ea was possibly also associated with Inshushinak and the Dilmunite god Enzag.

At Ebla, the local form of Ea was associated with Zilašu, the local form of the Mesopotamian beer goddess Siris. He was also connected with Rašap, an Underworld god.

In a god list part of an Ugaritic ritual, Ea is identified with Kothar-wa-Khasis, like him a god associated with craftsmanship.

Ea and his spouse Damgalnuna were connected with the Hurrian goddesses of fate, Hutena and Hutellura, or to their Hittite counterparts, the Gulses and the Mother-Goddess, in some lists.

Ea was identified with Kronos in the writings of Berossos in the third century BCE.

Comparisons have been sometimes made between Ea and the Greek Titan Prometheus in modern scholarship. They both feature as culture heroes, and save humanity from extinction by warning a human protege in a flood myth. Both are depicted as largely responsible for the various facets of human civilization, and the creation of man. Some scholars have argued that Prometheus was assimilated to Ea by the Greeks, and that he acquired his role as a culture hero as a result, though this view is not universally accepted.

In 1964, a team of Italian archaeologists under the direction of Paolo Matthiae of the University of Rome La Sapienza performed a series of excavations of material from the third-millennium BCE city of Ebla. Much of the written material found in these digs was later translated by Giovanni Pettinato. Among other conclusions, he found a tendency among the inhabitants of Ebla, after the reign of Sargon of Akkad, to replace the name of El, king of the gods of the Canaanite pantheon (found in names such as Mikael and Ishmael), with Ia (Mikaia, Ishmaia). Jean Bottéro (1952) and others suggested that Ia in this case is a West Semitic (Canaanite) way of pronouncing the Akkadian name Ea. In the nineteenth and early twenty century some scholars proposed that the Israelite god Ya[hweh] was derived from the Mesopotamian Ea, and these views are upheld by a minority of modern scholars.

== Worship ==
=== Third millennium BCE ===
Early attestations of Enki appear in documents from the Fāra (Early Dynastic IIIa) period. His main cult center was the city of Eridu, which was regarded as his home already in the sources of the Early Dynastic Period. Enki was referred to as king of the Abzû and king of Eridu in inscriptions from this period onwards. Eridu was one of the oldest cities of Sumer. The earliest evidence of occupation at the site dates to the early Ubaid period. The temple of Enki in Eridu was the E-Abzû ("House of the Abzû"). It could be referred to with the by name Eengura ("House of Sweet Waters") in Sumerian literature or cultic laments. The name of Enki/Ea's ziggurat in Eridu was Enunir ("House, Temple-Tower"). It is already attested in the Temple Hymns, and is mentioned in sumerian literature such as the lament for Eridu and the hymn to Haya as well as in the later syncretistic hymn to Nanaya. In the Early Dynastic period, construction work was done on the E-Abzû by a king of Ur, Elili.

Enki was regarded as a high ranking deity in the Sumerian city states at the time of the earliest written sources, as evidenced by his prominent position in the Fara and Abu Salabikh god lists, and by royal inscriptions from the period. In the territory of Lagash, it is presumed that he was worshipped in the numerous shrines bearing the name "Abzû" in the region. One of these shrines, the Abzû-banda ("Small Abzû") was built by Ur-Nanshe and plundered some generations later by Lugalzagesi in his invasion of Lagash. An inscription of Enmetena commemorates his building of the Abzû of Parsir for "Enki, lord of Eridu". In the inscriptions of the rulers of Lagash, Enki is characterized as the god who grants wisdom to the ruler, and who assists him with temple building. In the Stele of Vultures, Enki is invoked after Enlil and Ninhursag, and before Suen, Utu, and Ninki. After the part of the curse section of the Stele invoking Enki, the text further mentions carp-fish that go to the Abzû. According to Espak, this is possibly to be interpreted as carp-fish being released to take the oath to Enki in the Abzû, similarly to another passage which mentions doves being released to carry the oath to the moon god Suen in Ur. An inscription of Ur-Nanshe dealing with the building of a temple in Girsu contains an incantation invoking Enki to assist with the temple construction. He is asked to place the root of the reed inside the earth and to give a building oracle. In Umma, the construction of a temple for Enkigal ("the great Enki") is known from an inscription of Ur-Lumma. The king Gisha-kidu describes Enki as his adviser.

The earliest attestations of the name of the god Ea date to the 24th century BCE. It is uncertain when Enki and Ea were fully assimilated with each other, though Alfonso Archi argues that a syncretism already existed before the Akkadian conquest in some parts of Babylonia. In Ebla, the logogram ^{d}en-ki was used to write the name of the local form of Ea, Hayya, in the pre-Sargonic period. He had a place of worship in the city, attested under the designation é ^{d}en-ki. A festival of Ea is attested in Ebla, which took place in the twelfth month. It is known that jugglers participated in the festival, and that it included the presentation of a man and a woman to the god as well as an invocation at a gate.

The influence of Enki expanded beyond the confines of southern Mesopotamia at an early period. In Kish, a sanctuary of the god existed in the Old Akkadian period.

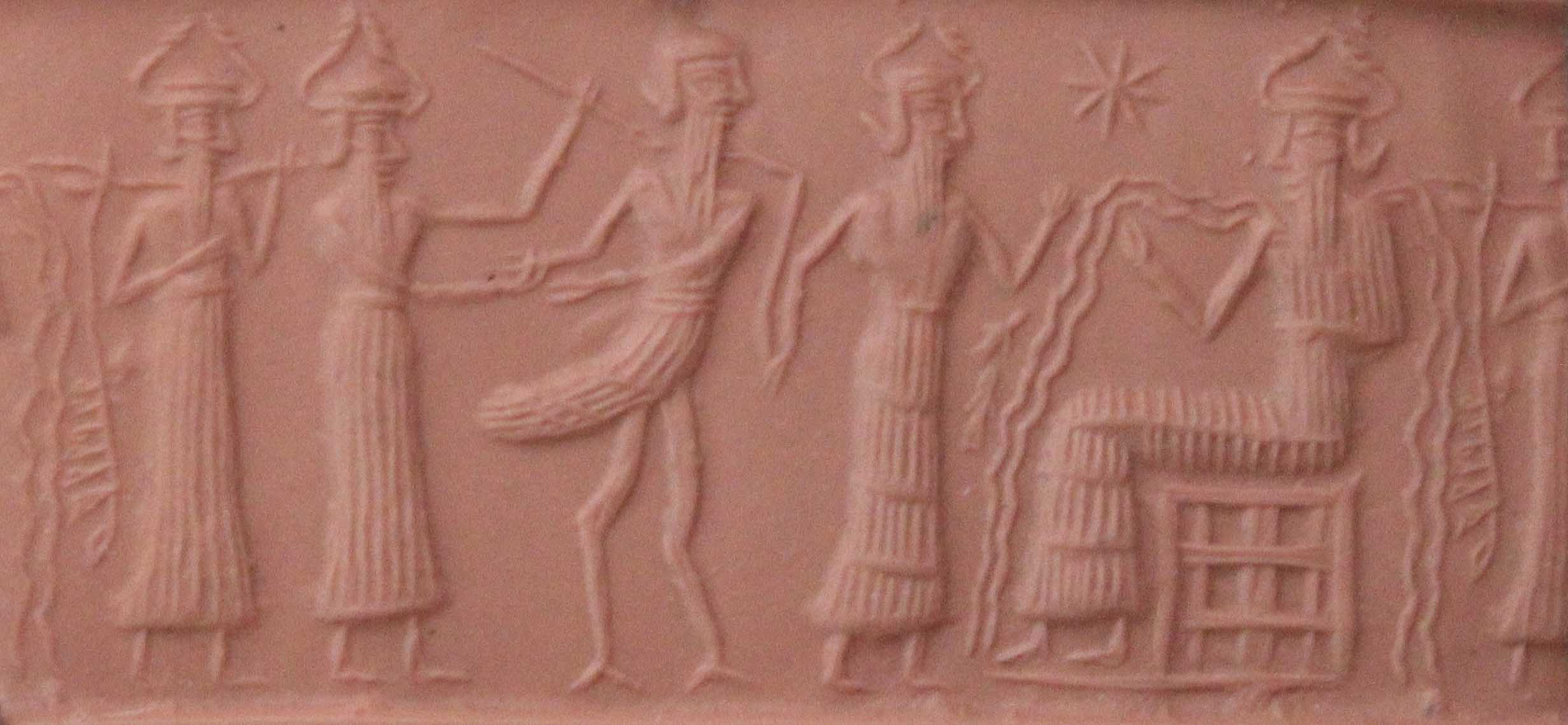
Akkadian cylinder seal representing three gods introducing a half bird, half man creature before the enthroned Enki.

Enki is one of the gods mentioned in the inscription of Naram-Sin of Akkad on the Bassekti Statue dealing with the deification of the king. As he was not among the major gods of the dynasty of Akkad, his appearance here is likely connected to his status as one of the chief deities of Sumer. A fragment from another inscription of Naram-Sin dealing with his successful campaigns against Shimanum describes Enki as the helper of the king.The end of a curse formula of an inscription of Naram-Sin invokes Enki to withdraw access to irrigation water from his enemy, and to take away his knowledge.

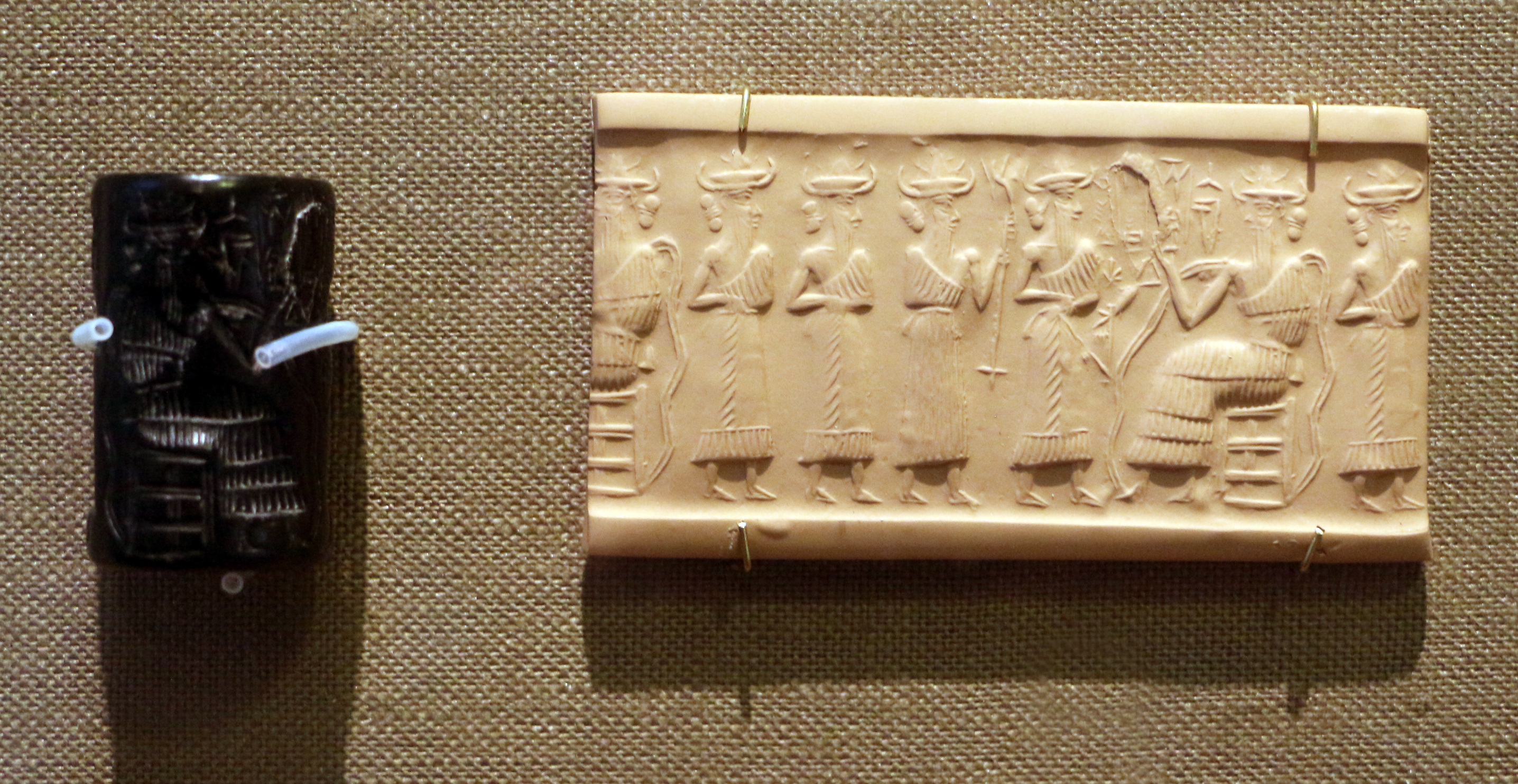
Akkadian cylinder seal depicting four deities stepping before the enthroned Enki.

In the period following the fall of the Akkadian Empire, the Lagashite ruler Ur-Bau commemorated his building of a temple of Enki in Girsu in an inscription. His successor Gudea built a temple on the bank of the Tigris for Enki, which is also attested from an offering list from the Ur III period.

The cult of Enki/Ea was particularly influential in the following Ur III and Old Babylonian periods. From the Ur III period, Enki/Ea came to be regarded as part of a triad occupying the top rank in the pantheon and consisting of himself, Anu, and Enlil. Ur III rulers Ur-Nammu, Amar-Suen, and possibly Shulgi commemorated their repair work on Enki's E-Abzû in Eridu. A temple of Enki existed in Ur itself in this period. Its name was Egeštušudu ("House of Perfect Wisdom"). Temples of Enki/Ea are further attested in Umma and Puzrish-Dagan. A variety of priestly as well as secular offices from the temple of Enki in Eridu are attested. A known office is that of the en-priestess. Galter points out that this position might have had a notable importance in the time of the Ur III dynasty, as the appointment of the en-priestess of Eridu was the subject of a year name during the rule of Shulgi, Amar-Suen, and Ibbi-Sin. Enkum (purification priests) and Ninkum (purification priestesses) were another class of cultic officials from Eridu in the service of Enki. They chiefly used water contained in various vessels for their rituals. In the myth Inanna and Enki, Enkum and Ninkum are servants of Enki that he sends after the goddess to retrieve the me-s that she took. Ishib (lustration priests) are also attested as part of the cult of the god, though unlike the enkum, this office was not specific to the tradition of Eridu. The myth Inanna and Shukaletuda mentions khôl mascara worn by the ishib of Eridu.

=== Second millennium BCE ===
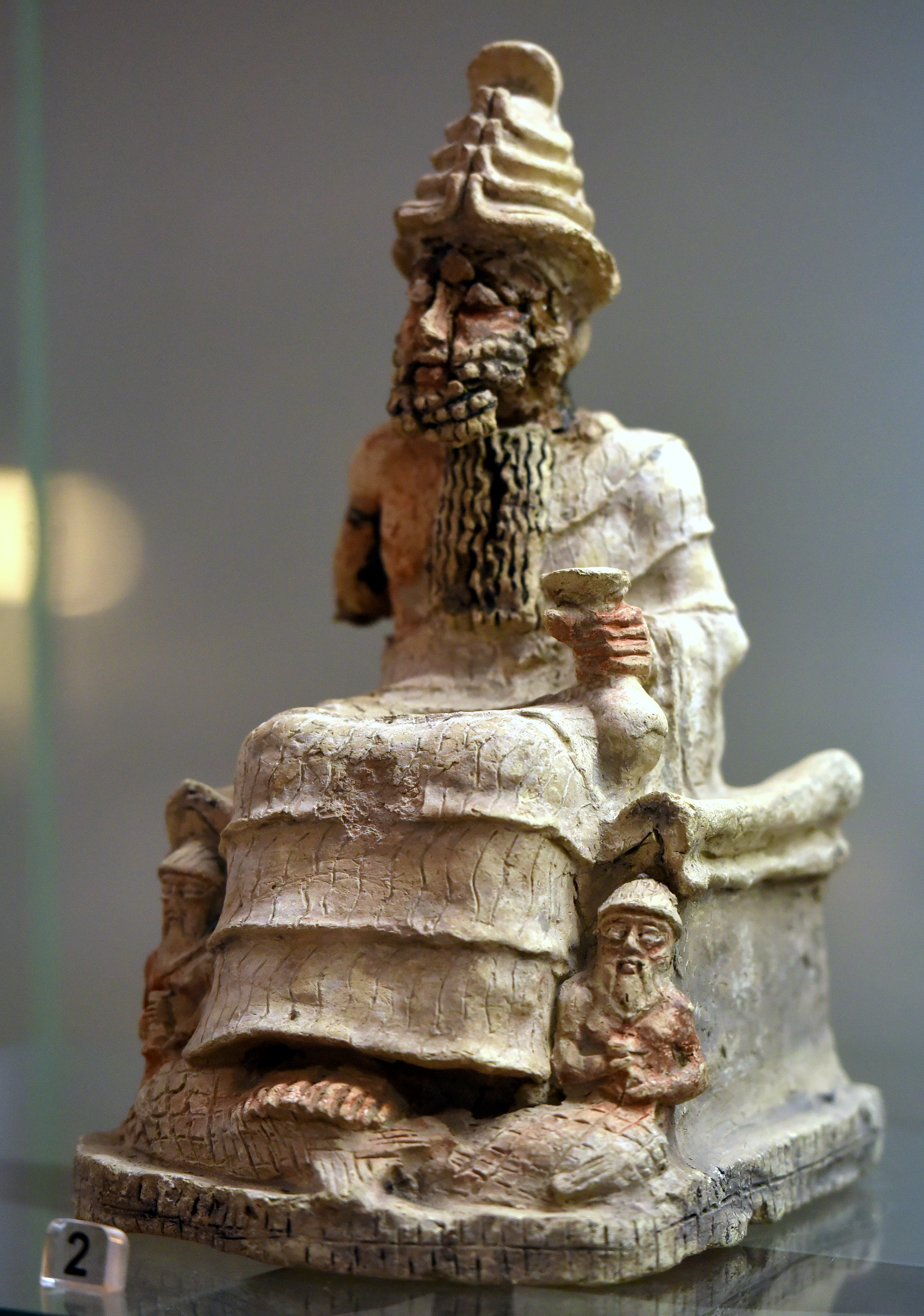
God Ea, seated, holding a cup. From Nasiriyah, southern Iraq, 2004–1595 BCE. Iraq Museum

Ea's cult spread to Mari, where the earliest evidence for its presence dates to the beginning of the second millennium. He was one of the major deities of the local pantheon. Evidence from tablets dating to the first two centuries of the second millennium indicate that he was one of the deities most frequently invoked in Mariote personal names. Some examples include Ea-malik, Nabi-Ea, Rama-Ea and Idlal-Ea. He had a sanctuary in the city, which is referred to as é ^{d}en-ki in documents. The curse section of an inscription of Puzur-Ishtar invokes Ea alongside Dagan and Ishtar. In the great list of sacrifices of the time of Zimri-Lim, the quantity of offerings that Ea receives is only second to that of the goddess Dīrītum, and on par with high ranking deities such as Dagan and Adad.

In the Old Babylonian Period, Enki/Ea's cult is attested in most of the important cities of Babylonia. In Nippur, Enki and Damgalnuna's temple is known from a fragment of a business document from the reign of Samsu-Iluna. Enki also had a shrine in Sippar in this period. In seals from this city, Enki/Ea and Damgalnuna/Damkina are the third most invoked couple after Shamash and Aya and Adad and Shala. An inscription of Sin-kashid attests his building of a temple of Enki/Ea in Uruk, though the god is not mentioned in this king's year name formulas. Ea's temple in Kisurra was built by Itur-Shamash. Shrines of Enki/Ea are attested in Isin and Dilbat.

Ea and his wife Damkina were also the tutelary deities of Malgium, the capital of a small kingdom east of the Tigris and south of Eshnunna essentially known from sources of the Old Babylonian Period. The location of the city has not been identified. An inscription of a king of Malgium, Takil-ilissu, documents the repair work he made on the Enamtila ("House of life"), possibly the temple of Ea and Damkina in this city. The curse formula of the same inscription invokes Ea, Damkina, and Ea's attendant Ara. An inscription from another king, Ipiq-Ishtar, relates that after Anu, Enlil, Dingirmah and Ea determined the fate of Malgium, Ea counseled Damkina to make firm the foundations of Malgium by ensuring a long dynastic kingship in order to avert disaster for the kingdom. This has been interpreted as a possible euphemism to legitimate an usurpation of the throne.

Nur-Adad of Larsa commemorated the repair work he did on the E-Abzû of Eridu. In Larsa itself, a temple of Ea was built or rebuilt by Rim-Sin I. Rim-Sin I repeatedly used the epithet "who perfectly executes the me's and rites of Eridu" in his inscriptions, which attests of the importance that Ea and Eridu held for this king. Starting with his twenty-second year name, Rim-Sin I began to mention the triad Anu-Enlil-Ea in his year names, possibly reflecting his ambition to rule over southern Babylonia. The king also rebuilt Enki's temple in Ur. It was headed by a sanga (administrator). Enkum and ishib are among the offices attested. The office of sanga, enkum and ishib belonged to the category of priestly offices that were transmitted by inheritance. Secular offices that could be bought are also attested, and included that of oven worker and brewer. Enki, Damgalnuna and Asalluhi were also worshipped in a chapel inside the city's main sanctuary, the Ekišnugal.

After Rim-Sin I, Ea is no longer mentioned in year name formulas. He only rarely appears in the royal inscriptions of the First Dynasty of Babylon. Unlike Anu and Enlil, he is not mentioned in the year formulas of Hammurabi, though he features prominently in two hymns of praise to this ruler. One of them describes Ea bestowing kingship upon the lands to Hammurabi. Hammurabi was also a patron of the E-Abzû of Eridu.

The kings of the First Sealand Dynasty restored the tradition of invoking Ea in year names. After the Old Babylonian period, evidence for the worship of Ea outside of Eridu is scarce. A temple of Ea and Damkina in Nippur is mentioned in a Middle Babylonian metrological text. By contrast, evidence from the First Sealand Dynasty indicates that Ea was a major deity in the state pantheon. The cult of Ea together with Enlil replaced the former triad of Anu, Enlil, and Ea at the head of the pantheon. Ea was also rather frequently invoked in personal names from the region. Curse formulas on Kassite kudurrus often invoke the triad Anu-Enlil-Ea first in their listing of deities. At the end of the second millennium BCE, the rise of Babylon led to its tutelary god Marduk becoming the head of the Mesopotamian pantheon. As a consequence, Ea's cult lost importance in favour of that of his son. Marduk took over certain functions of his father such as his role as organizer of the earth.

=== First millennium BCE ===
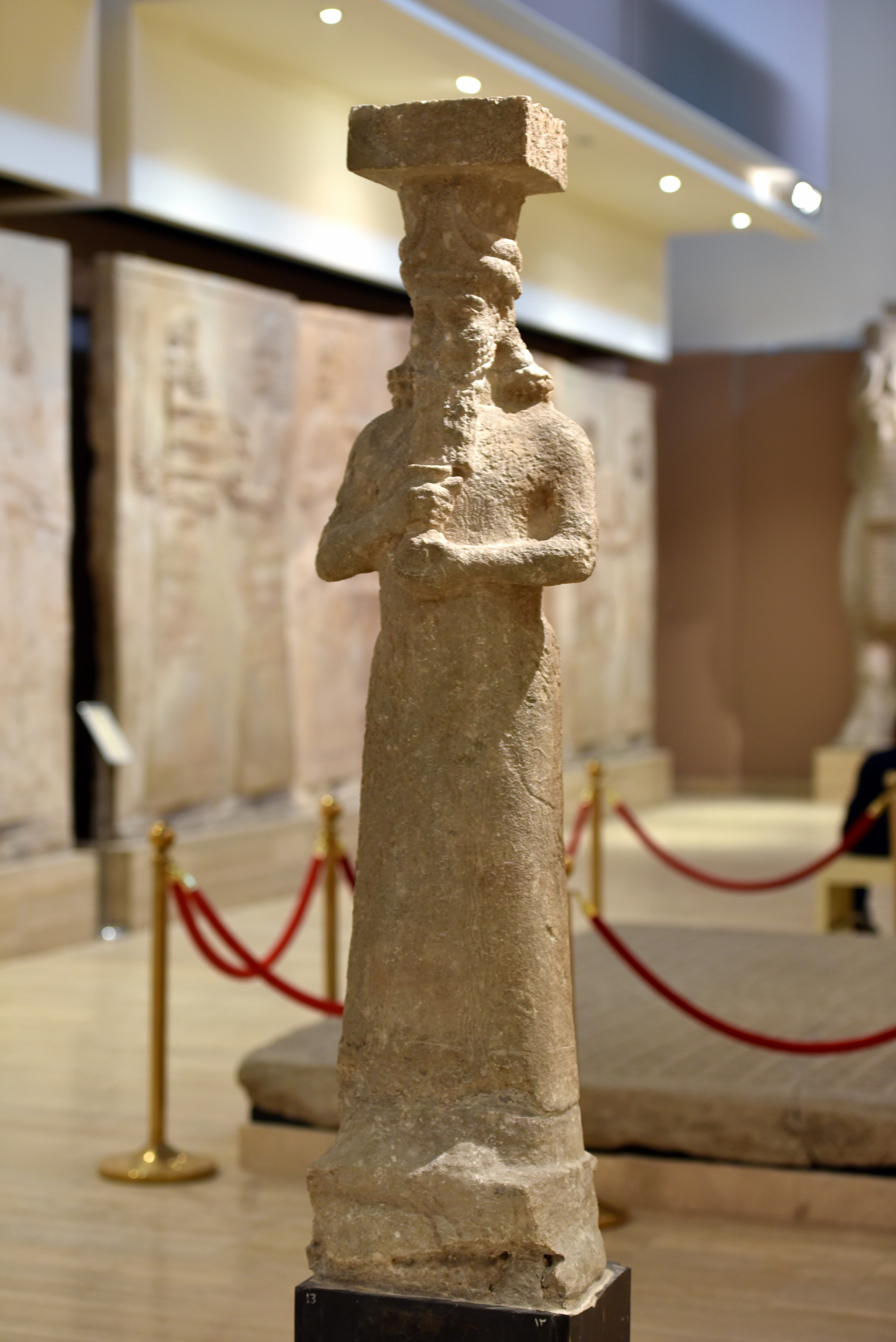
God Ea, a statue from Khorsabad, late 8th century BCE, Iraq, now in the Iraq Museum

Ea nevertheless remained an important deity in ritual and cult in first millennium BCE Babylonia. He also retained a degree of importance in the realm of personal piety through his role as the god of magic and incantations, though by contrast he is only infrequently invoked in theophoric personal names of this period, with names formed invoking Marduk or Nabu predominating. Most of the personal names invoking Ea between the sixth and fourth centuries BCE belong to individuals from Babylon. In Babylon, Ea was worshipped in the Ekarzagina ("House of Pure Quay or House of the Quay of Lapis Lazuli"), a temple which was part of the complex of Esagil. The earliest evidence for the existence of a temple of the god in Babylon dates to the first millennium. He also had multiple shrines within the city. Essarhaddon had a statue of Ea and other gods made and then purified in the Ekarzagina. An inscription of Assurbanipal commemorates his repair work on this temple, and Nabonidus furnished it with a new throne. Ea's temple in Babylon is still mentioned in a description of the Esagil complex dating to the Seleucid period. Shrines of Ea are attested in Uruk, Sippar, Borsippa, and possibly Nippur between the sixth and fourth century BCE.

Ea was also worshipped in first millennium BCE Assyria. His cult there is attested in the cities of Assur, where he had several shrines, Nineveh, and Kalhu. In this region, he is usually mentioned under the name Ea-šarru. The temple of Ea and Damkina at Kalhu was rebuilt by Assurnasirpal II. In Assyrian royal inscriptions, Ea is chiefly characterized by his aspect as a craftsman god who assists with building projects.

=== Anatolian reception ===
The worship of Ea was introduced into Anatolia through the Hurrian cults. According to Piotr Taracha, he might have been introduced in the region in the third millennium BCE already. In Hurrian religion, the cult of the god was adopted directly from Babylonia, and he was regarded as a prominent, active god, with a similar rank to the one he held in his region of origin. Ea's character and role were functionally identical to the ones he had in Babylonia. His name was rendered as Eyan in Hurrian, Aaš in Hittite, and Iyas in Luwian. He could be invoked as a divine witness in political treaties; the earliest evidence for this dates to the fourteenth century BCE. He could also be invoked in rituals overseeing the construction of buildings. In the procession of Hurrian gods of the sanctuary of Yazilikaya dating to the reign of the Hittite king Tudhaliya IV, Ea is depicted following Kumarbi, and preceding the male form of Shaushka and his two handmaidens Ninatta and Kulitta. In a Hurrian ritual regarding the construction of buildings, Ea receives, among numerous other offerings, ear shaped bread. The akkadian word for ear, adopted as a loanword in Hurrian, was the same as the word for wisdom. Therefore, the shape of the bread was directly connected to the attribute of the god invoked to guarantee the success of the construction. A temple of Ea is attested in Hattusa in the thirteenth century BCE. He was still regarded as a prominent god by the Hittites of Northern Syria in the first millennium BCE.

== Mythology ==
=== Creation myths ===
==== Enki and the world order ====
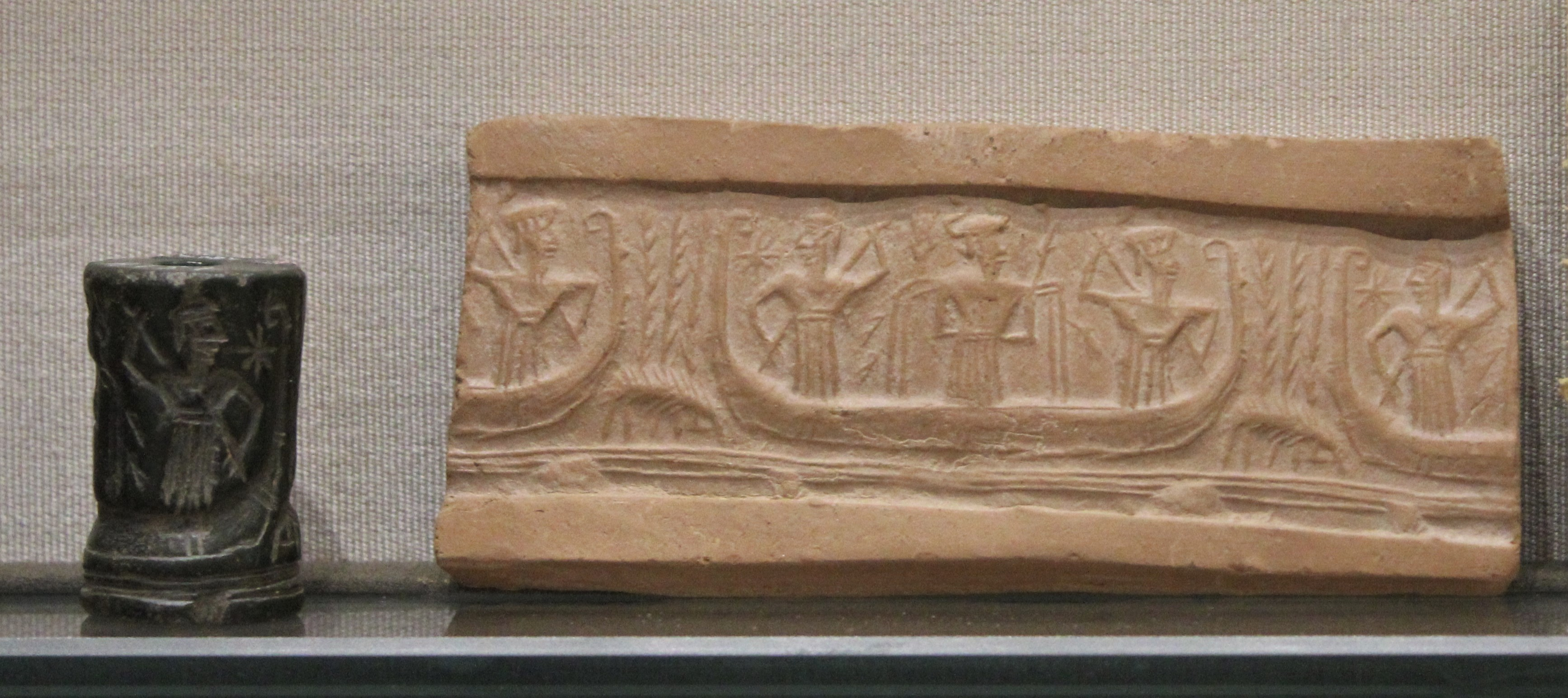
Akkadian cylinder seal depicting Enki travelling in his boat.

Preserved from Old Babylonian tablets, Enki and the world order is one of the longest and best preserved myths in the sumerian language. It portrays Enki as the god responsible for the organization of the world. His prerogatives are given to him by Enlil, the chief god of the pantheon, here his older brother. In this myth, the city of Ur is depicted as the capital of Sumer. It has been argued that this reflects an original date of composition of the myth at the time of the Ur III dynasty.

The composition begins with the poet's praise of Enki. Enki then praises himself twice, declaring his intention to journey to Sumer, Meluhha, Magan and Dilmun, to which the Anuna-gods respond positively, praising his connection to the me-s, fundamental powers and decrees of the gods which enable the functioning of human civilisation. The cult personnel of Enki performs various rituals to purify his temple. The god then travels on his boat, accompanied by his divine attendants. He blesses Sumer and the city of Ur. He then travels to Meluhha, which he blesses with luxuriant fauna and flora, and Dilmun, which he purifies, blesses, and gives to Ninsikila. He also blesses the Martu. In a fragmentary passage, he curses Elam and Marhashi.

The second half of the composition focuses on his institution of different crafts and his attribution of different areas of responsibilities to other gods. Enki fills the Tigris and Euphrates with water and puts Enbilulu in charge of its regulation, then he puts a deity whose name is not preserved in charge of the lagoons and marshes. He entrusts the sea, where he built a shrine, to Nanshe, plans the functioning of the rain, and puts Ishkur in charge of it. He takes care of the agricultural tools and puts Enkimdu in charge of them, then he provides the field with various grains and vegetables, and assigns this domain to Ezina. Enki assigns the task of preparing bricks to Kulla; he then builds a model house, and appoints Mushdamma in charge of house construction. After providing the steppe with vegetation and herds, he puts Šumugan in charge of it. He builds stalls and sheepfolds and assigns this domain to Dumuzi. He performs certain tasks, such as the demarcation of boundaries, and puts Utu in charge of the universe. He then organizes the art of weaving and assigns this domain to Uttu. In the last, and longest section, Inanna intervenes to complain that she has not received suitable functions. In a badly preserved section, Enki responds by pointing out the functions that she already holds.

==== Enki and Ninhursag ====
This myth is known from three Old Babylonian copies, one from Nippur, one from Ur, and one from an unknown provenance. It is a source of debate in modern scholarship, subject to various different translations and interpretations.

At the beginning of the text, the story is set in Dilmun. The goddess of Dilmun, Ninsikila, complains to Enki that her land lacks water. Enki responds by summoning underground sweet waters to Dilmun, and as a result it becomes a rich, fertile land. Some scholars identify Ninsikila as another name of Ninhursag in this myth. However, this interpretation is not universally accepted.

The next scene takes place in the marshes in the south of Sumer. Enki sleeps with Ninhursag, and she becomes pregnant. After nine days of gestation, she gives birth to Ninnisig/Ninšar. One day, Enki spots Ninnisig/Ninšar along the riverbank in the marsh. He also sleeps with her, she becomes pregnant, and after nine days of gestation, she gives birth to Ninkurra. Similarly, Enki sees her, has intercourse with her, she becomes pregnant, and after nine days of gestation, she gives birth to Uttu. In a variant of the story, she instead gives birth to Ninimma, who is the one to give birth to Uttu. What follows is a fragmentary passage in which Ninhursag apparently instructs Uttu to not let Enki into her house unless he gives her cucumbers, apples and grapes as a gift. Enki summons sweet waters, making the land fertile, and a gardener gives him cucumbers, apples and grapes as thanks. Enki brings them to Uttu, introducing himself as the gardener, and she opens her house to him. He then has intercourse with her. Ninhursag removes his semen from Uttu's body, and grows eight plants from it.

Enki spots the unfamiliar plants in the marsh, and decides to eat them in order to "know their heart" and "determine their destiny". As a result, Ninhursag curses him, and he falls deathly ill. A fox offers its help to Enlil and the other gods, and Enlil promises it fame and to erect two kiskanu trees in its honor if it succeeds in bringing Ninhursag back. The fox adorns itself and goes to see Ninhursag. Due to the fragmentary passage of the text, it is unknown how it managed to convince her to heal Enki. Ninhursag asks Enki which parts of him hurt, and after he names them, she facilitates the birth of eighth deities, which removes the illness from his body. Their names contain elements which pun with the ill body parts of Enki; Abu is connected to the top of the head, and the akkadian word abbattu, Ninsikila to the hair (siki), Ninkiriedu to the nose (kiri), Ninkasi to the mouth (ka), Nazi to the throat (zi), Azimua to the arm (á), Ninti to the rib (ti), and Ensag to the side (zag). The myth ends with the assignment of roles to the new deities, and a formula of praise to Enki.

Comparisons have been made between Enki's eating of the plants and its consequences and Adam and Eve's eating of the apple in Genesis.

==== Enki and Ninmah ====
This myth is known from a few tablets in Sumerian from the Old Babylonian period, as well as a bilingual Sumerian–Akkadian copy from the Neo-Assyrian period. In the first part of the myth, Enki creates humankind in collaboration with Nammu, Ninmah, and several helper goddesses, while the second part focuses on a drunken contest between Ninmah and Enki.

The beginning of the myth describes a time in which the gods had to work for their food themselves. The gods who work grow dissatisfied with their situation. Enki, who lies asleep in his bed in the Abzû, is woken up by Nammu, here his mother, who informs him of their complaints and tells him to create a substitute to perform the hard labour. Enki devises a plan to create humankind from the clay of the Abzû, and delegates its execution to his mother, assisted by Ninmah and seven helper goddesses.

In the second section, the gods take part in a banquet, where Enki is praised. Enki and Ninmah get drunk, and start a competition. Ninmah fashions six humans with some kind of physical disabilities, the nature of which is not always understood. Each time, Enki successfully finds a place in society for them. Then they exchange roles. Enki creates two beings, the second of which, called Umul, is in such bad shape that Ninmah cannot decree a ''good fate'' for them. As a result, she loses the competition. Then Ninmah gives a difficult to interpret speech where she complains about being chased from her city after it was attacked, accusing Enki of being responsible for her misfortune. Due to the damage to this section of the text, Enki's answer and the resolution of the myth is unclear, but it seems that he attempts to appease Ninmah and that he finds a place for Umul. Some scholars have interpreted Umul as a premature or not fully developed baby.

==== Enūma Eliš ====
The Babylonian Epic of Creation, celebrating the elevation of Babylon's national god Marduk as the head of the Mesopotamian pantheon, was composed in the second half of the second millennium BCE. It has been suggested to date to the reign of Nebuchadnezzar I, though there is no secure evidence for its date of composition. In Enūma Eliš, Ea plays a crucial role in killing Abzû, here personified as a god of an older generation, and he becomes the father of the future king of the gods, Marduk.

The beginning of the poem describes the creation of the first gods as a result of the mingling of Tiamat and Abzû. While Abzû is usually the name of Ea's underground cosmic water domain, it appears here as the personification of these waters and as Tiamat's consort. Ea is here the son of Anu, himself created from the union of the pair Anshar and Kishar, themselves the result of the union between Lahmu and Lahamu, themselves the result of the union between Tiamat and Abzû. The clamor and restless behaviour of the younger gods angers Abzû and Tiamat. While Tiamat is initially reluctant to harm her creations, Abzû plots to kill the younger gods, supported by his vizier, Mummu. Ea becomes aware of Abzû's designs and devises a plan to foil them. He fashions a sleep spell that he casts on Abzû and Mummu. When they are asleep, he binds and then kills Abzû, and imprisons Mummu.

Afterwards, he establishes his abode on the body of Abzû, which becomes his underground water domain. The following section deals with the birth of Marduk, Ea's son with Damkina, described as surpassing all of the gods. His grandfather Anu, delighted with the young god, gives him the four winds. The waves that Marduk creates by whirling the winds irritate a group of gods only specified as children of Tiamat. They urge her to act and avenge her consort and his vizier. She raises an army and takes the god Qingu as her new consort. When Ea learns of her preparations, he is horrified and brings the news to his grandfather Anshar. Anshar is initially angered and blames Ea for the situation caused by his murder of Abzû. Ea defends himself by arguing that it was a necessary action at the time. Anshar then orders Ea to defeat Tiamat. He fails, and Anshar then sends Anu, who also fails. Ea then summons his son and instructs him to seek out Anshar and volunteer to challenge Tiamat.

Then Ea from his secret dwelling called
[The perfect one] of Anshar (?), father of the great gods,
Whose heart is perfect like a fellow citizen or countryman (?),
The mighty heir who was to be his father's champion,
Who rushes (fearlessly) into battle : Marduk the Hero !
He told him his innermost design, saying,
‘O Marduk, take my advice, listen to your father !
You are the son who sets his heart at rest !
Approach Anshar, drawing near to him,
And make your voice heard, stand your ground:
he will be calmed by the sight of you.'

Foster proposes that while the design of Ea (in his translation ''secret words'') could refer to magic words told to Marduk, it could also be connected to Marduk's later demand to the gods to be made their king in exchange for his help. Marduk's offer is accepted by the gods. After his defeat of Tiamat, Marduk organizes the universe. He tells Ea his idea to create humankind from divine blood so that they might do the hard labor of the gods. Ea suggests that one of the rebels be killed to fashion this new creature. Marduk then demands that the rebellious gods hand over their leader in exchange for amnesty. The rebellious gods single out Qingu. He is executed, and Ea fashions humankind from his blood. While Ea still participates in the creation of humankind, in accordance with older Mesopotamian tradition where he works with the mother-goddess to fashion the new being, the idea of the creation of humankind is there attributed to his son. The role of the mother-goddess in the older tradition is here fully taken over by Ea. In the last sections dealing with Marduk's multiples names, Ea gives to his son his own name, and puts him in charge of his offices.

==== Disputation between the bird and the fish ====
The beginning of this Sumerian disputation poem relates a creation story centered on Enki. He is depicted bringing the waters of the land together and organizing them, giving the Tigris and Euphrates their places and laying down irrigation ditches. He sets up stalls, sheepfolds, cities and hamlets, causes the people to multiply and organizes their system of government. He then organizes the marshes, and furnishes them with abundant fauna and flora.

==== The First Brick ====
Ea appears in his role as a creator deity in a building incantation concerning the renovation of temples, known from Late Babylonian tablets and a late Assyrian fragment, dubbed "The First Brick". It contains a creation myth in which Ea creates the Abzû and then fashions from clay various deities, as well as a king and humankind, which all participate in the temple renovation process. The deities created are Kulla, tasked to renovate the first brick, the deities Ninildu, Ninsimug and Ninagal, tasked to help with the construction, the deities Arazu, Guškinbanda, Ninzadim, Ninkurra, Ašnan, Laḫar, Siris, Ningišzida, Ninšar, Adag, Umunmutamgu, and Umunmutamnag, the last eight of which are instructed to supply resources to humankind for their regular offerings, and finally Kusu, tasked to perform the rites of the temple.

=== Story of the flood ===
==== Atra-ḫasīs ====
This myth is the longest preserved Old Babylonian Epic. It is known from Old Babylonian tablets, the best preserved being three tablets written by the scribe Ku-Aya under the reign of Ammi-ṣaduqa, perhaps from Sippar, two Middle Babylonian pieces, one from Ras Shamra and one from Nippur, as well as fourteen Neo Assyrian pieces from the library of Ashurbanipal. Enki plays a crucial role in Atra-ḫasīs. He first creates humankind alongside the mother goddess (variously named Mami, Mama, Nintu, and Bēlet-ilī ), and later opposes Enlil's attempts to wipe it out, which culminate in the sending of the flood.

The myth begins describing a time in which the gods had to work for their food themselves. The gods divide the world between themselves; Anu claims the Heavens as his domain, Enlil claims the Earth, and Enki claims the underground water ocean Abzû. The task of working falls to the Igigi gods. After 40 years of toiling, they grow discontent and rebellious. They set fire to their tools and surround Enlil's Ekur shrine in Nippur. Enlil is woken up by his vizier Nusku, who informs him of the situation. Anu and Enki are brought into Enlil's presence. Enki suggests that the mother goddess creates a new being, man, to bear the load of the work instead of the Igigi. He proposes a plan to create man from a mix of clay and divine blood, and works together with the mother goddess to fashion this new creature. The god Wê-ila is killed and his blood used to create humankind. The process of creation of humankind itself is not entirely preserved. The mother goddess is congratulated and named "Mistress of all gods", Bēlet-kāla-ilī.

In the next section of the myth, humankind has multiplied, and they create so much noise that Enlil is unable to sleep. He decides to wipe out humanity by sending a plague. The text introduces Atra-ḫasīs, who prays to his god, Enki, for help. Enki instructs him to tell his fellow men to stop praying and sending offerings to all of the gods, and to instead concentrate their offerings on the god responsible for the plague, Namtar. Atra-ḫasīs executes Enki's instructions and Namtar, pleased and embarrassed by the gift, alleviates the plague. Humans multiply, and once again Enlil is unable to sleep due to the noise. He decides this time to wipe out humanity with a famine and orders Adad, the weather-god, to withhold his rain. Once more Atra-ḫasīs prays to Enki, who instructs him to tell his fellow men to stop praying and sending offerings to all of the gods, and to instead concentrate their offerings on Adad. Adad is embarrassed by the gift and discreetly allows enough rain for humanity to survive. The composition at this point is fragmentary and entire passages are missing. Enlil resumes the drought but appoints Anu and Adad as guards of the heavens, Enki as guard of the regions under the earth, and himself as guard of the earth. His plan is foiled in an incident which involves fish being freed on the starving humanity. Enlil then confronts Enki. He decrees that humanity will be wiped out by a flood, and has him swear an oath against his will to ensure his cooperation.

Enki finds a way to bypass his oath and sends a dream to Atra-ḫasīs. When Atra-ḫasīs seeks clarification about the dream, Enki speaks indirectly to him through a reed wall, and instructs him to build a boat and destroy his house. He warns him that the flood will come on the seventh day. Atra-ḫasīs speaks with his elders and explains his departure by telling them that since Enki had a falling out with Enlil, he, as Enki's servant, must leave Enlil's earth. The people help him build his boat and load it with animals. Before the departure, he holds a banquet, but he cannot take part in it himself, as he is feeling sick with the knowledge of the impending destruction. On the seventh day the flood comes and wipes out humanity, with the exception of Atra-ḫasīs and his family on the boat. Enki and Bēlet-ilī grieve for their creation, and the gods begin to suffer from hunger, since they no longer receive food offerings. The flood lasts for seven days and seven nights. When the flood ends, Atra-ḫasīs makes an offering to the gods. When he discovers that a part of humanity survived, Enlil is furious and confronts Enki again. The section of the text containing Enki's reply is damaged, but Enlil is convinced to let humanity live. In exchange, he has Enki and Bēlet-ilī institute ways of controlling their population. Only a part of the proposals of Enki and Bēlet-ilī is preserved; it concerns the creation of infertile women, and the institution of classes of priestesses that do not bear children.

==== The Eridu Genesis ====
This fragmentary myth in the Sumerian language preserves another account of the Mesopotamian story of the flood. It is reconstituted from several related, but distinct variants preserved from two fragments, one from Nippur and one from Ur, both dating to the Old Babylonian period (circa 1600 BCE), as well as a bilingual sumero-akkadian fragment from the library of Ashurbanipal. As the oldest fragment preserving this myth dates from around the same period as the tablets preserving Atra-ḫasīs, the relation between the two texts is uncertain.

Though much of the text is lost, it is presumed that Enki plays the same role as he does in other accounts dealing with the flood, and ultimately placates Enlil, ensuring that humankind is allowed to survive. The beginning of the composition seemingly deals with the creation of man, an act for which An, Enlil, Enki and Ninhursag are credited. Another fragmentary section dealing with the establishment of the first cities describes Nintu giving Eridu to Enki. A badly preserved portion of the text deals with the scene where the flood hero, here named Ziusudra, receives Enki's warning about the flood through a wall.

==== Epic of Gilgamesh ====
Tablet XI of the standard edition of the Akkadian Epic of Gilgamesh tells the story of the flood, in which Ea plays the same role as in Atra-ḫasīs. The flood story in the Epic of Gilgamesh is believed to be based on the one in Atra-ḫasīs.

Gilgamesh meets the flood survivor, here named Utnapishtim, during his quest for immortality. Utnapishtim tells him how he and his wife survived the flood and were made immortal by the gods as a result. The reason why the gods sent the flood is not given. They swore an oath to make sure the task would be accomplished. Ea, who did not wish to see humankind destroyed, found a way around his oath and warned Utnapishtim. He sent him a dream, and then, speaking his words through a reed wall, he instructed him to demolish his house and build a boat. When Utnapishtim asked him what to tell the elders and the people of his city of Shuruppak, Ea instructed him to tell them that since he had fallen out with Enlil, he could not remain on the earth and that he was going to live in Ea's underground ocean. With the help of his people, Utnapishtim built a massive boat that he filled with his kin, possessions, and animals. The flood came and wiped out humanity. It lasted for six days. When the flood stopped, Utnapishtim sent three birds to see if the waters had decreased enough for him to land. This episode has been compared to a similar one in the account of the flood related in the Book of Genesis. After the last bird failed to come back to the boat, Utnapishtim prepared an offering for the gods on the top of the mountain. When Enlil realized that humans still lived, he was furious, and demanded to know the reason for their survival. Ninurta answered that Ea was the only one capable of this feat. Ea told Enlil that his decision to wipe out humanity was a disproportionate punishment, and proposed other ways to control the size of its population. Enlil, convinced to let humanity live, granted Utnapishtim and his wife immortality.

==== The Babyloniaca ====
Ea was assimilated with Kronos in the writings of Berossos. Berossos transmitted a variant of the Mesopotamian story of the flood in his Babyloniaca, a work meant to present the history of the Babylonians to the Greeks. His original work is lost, but it is known from quotes of Alexander Polyhistor and Abydenus, themselves quoted by Eusebius. There Kronos warns Xisuthros (the hellenized form of the sumerian Ziusudra) about the incoming flood, appearing to him in a dream in the version quoted by Polyhistor. He instructs him to build a boat, stuff it with provisions and animals, and take his family and kin with him. He tells him the exact month in which the flood will come, and also instructs him to bury all writings in Sippar, two details which are not present in the older cuneiform sources.

=== Inanna myths ===
==== Inanna and Enki ====
This long myth is preserved from a few tablets dating to the first third of the second millennium BCE.

It tells the story of how Inanna acquired the me-s from Enki, their guardian.

The plot begins when Inanna travels to Enki's temple in Eridu. Enki instructs his sukkal Isimud to give her food, drink, and to treat her as a friend. Inanna and Enki then begin a drinking contest. Thoroughly drunk, Enki gives her over a hundred me-s. The list of the me-s is not fully preserved. It includes the me-s connected to aspects of human culture such as kingship, war, priestly offices, speech, crafts (woodworking, metalworking, writing, smithing, leather working, masonry, and basket weaving), eroticism and intelligence, among others. Inanna takes them and loads them into the Boat of Heaven, and she departs for her city of Uruk. When he is sober again, Enki realizes that the me-s are missing. He asks Isimud where they are, and the sukkal replies that he has given them all to Inanna. Enki's reaction is missing due to the fragmentary of the text at this point, but determined to get back the me-s, he dispatches Isimud and enkum servants to seize the Boat of Heaven and its cargo.

Isimud catches up with Inanna and tells her that while she is free to return to Uruk, Enki has ordered that the Boat of Heaven be brought back to Eridu, which angers the goddess. As soon as the enkums grab the Boat, Inanna summons her sukkal Ninshubur, who prevents them from seizing it in unclear circumstances. Enki then attempts to take back the me-s five more times. The second time, he dispatches Isimud alongside the fifty giants of Eridu, the third time alongside the fifty Lahamu of the Engur, the fourth time alongside the "Big fish", the fifth time alongside the guards of Uruk, and the sixth time alongside the guards of the Turungal canal. Each time, Inanna calls Ninshubur and the Boat of Heaven is able to continue its journey. Inanna eventually reaches Uruk triumphantly and unloads the me-s among the celebration of her people. At the end of the myth Enki gives a speech that for the most part is lost, but whose last lines may indicate his reconciliation with Inanna and Uruk.

==== Inanna's descent into the Underworld ====
Enki/Ea plays a supporting role in the Sumerian poem Inanna's descent into the Underworld, and the shorter Akkadian poem Ishtar's descent, where he devises a plan to revive the eponymous goddess after she has been struck dead by Ereshkigal.

In the Sumerian version, as Inanna makes her preparations to journey into the Underworld, she instructs her sukkal Ninshubur to ask Enlil, Nanna, and Enki for help if something happens to her. The queen of the Underworld, Ereshkigal, is displeased to learn of Inanna's visit. When Inanna is brought into her presence, Ereshkigal strikes her down and hangs her corpse from a nail. Ninshubur, in mourning, goes to see Enlil and Nanna, but both of them refuse to help her. She then goes to see Enki, who expresses concern for Inanna and agrees to help. He fashions two androgynous beings, the galaturra and the kurgarra, from the dirt beneath his fingernails, and gives them the water and bread of life. He then tells them to go see Ereshkigal, who is in labour, and to express sympathy. When, appeased, she offers them gifts, Enki instructs them to refuse all of them, and instead to ask only for the corpse on the nail. Finally they are to sprinkle the food of life and the water of life upon it to revive Inanna. The plan succeeds, and Inanna is able to leave the Underworld, though she then has to find a substitute to take her place there. She picks her husband Dumuzi, who, unlike her attendants, was not mourning her properly.

In the Akkadian version, it is Papsukkal that comes to see the gods with the news that since Ishtar has been trapped in the Underworld, all sexual activity has ceased on earth. Ea creates Asushunamir, an androgynous figure, and instructs them to appease Ereshkigal, and then to have her swear an oath of the great gods to give them the water of life. Ishtar is revived, but Ereshkigal is furious and she curses Asushunamir to a grim life on earth.

==== The Agushaya hymn ====
Ea plays a major role in this Old Babylonian literary work. Known from two tablets of unknown provenance, it is one of the most difficult literary texts of the period. Here the god appears in his usual role in Mesopotamian literature as an ingenious deity who devises plans to resolve difficult situations.

The poem begins with a hymn praising Ishtar in her aspect as the goddess of war. Her excessively aggressive behaviour irritates Ea, who resolves to put an end to it. He proposes to the gods to create her an opponent, Ṣaltu ("discord"). As he is the only one with the skill to accomplish the task he has proposed, the gods delegate its execution to him. Ea then creates Ṣaltu from the dirt beneath his fingernails. She is described as a powerful fighter of monstrous proportions. Ea then tells Ṣaltu that she has been created to disrespectfully challenge Ishtar, whom he calls Irnina ( the name of one of her aspects) and he instructs her on how she is to act. He proceeds to describe Ishtar so that Ṣaltu might recognize her. In a fragmentary section, Ea taunts Ṣaltu by praising Ishtar.

So he dispatched Ṣaltu
extraordinary of form
making her tremble with insults,
contempt and calumny.
Ea the wise, whose reasoning is beyond all,
goes on to add yet a word
(that cuts) to her heart.
The sign of Ishtar the queen he gives her-
for it is Ishtar herself, greater than all the gods.
He makes her know her grandeur.
He well describes to her that prideful self,
this lest she avoid (her) later.

As a result, Ṣaltu flows into a rage and goes to look for the goddess. Ishtar hears of this new opponent and dispatches her sukkal Ninshubur to acquire more information on her. The confrontation between Ishtar and Ṣaltu is lost. In the last section, the goddess, now referred to with the name Agushaya, complains to Ea about Ṣaltu and demands that he sends her away. Ea responds positively, and declares that one day of the year people will perform a whirling dance in the street in her honor. The end of the poem indicates that Ishtar has abandoned her overly violent ways.

==== Inanna and Shukaletuda ====
After the prologue of this Sumerian myth, a short story relates how Enki gives to a raven certain tasks, including growing the first palm tree. After Inanna is raped in her sleep by the gardener Shukaletuda, she ravages the land with plagues in search of him, but with the advice of his father, he hides among the masses and is able to initially escape her wrath. Inanna travels to Enki's temple in Eridu, and asks for his assistance, threatening to not come back to her sanctuary until she is able to bring her attacker to justice. Enki agrees, and the goddess is able to find Shukaletuda by "stretching herself across the whole sky like a rainbow". She then condemns him to death. Bottéro presumes that the father of Shukaletuda is Enki in his interpretation of the myth.

=== Miscellaneous myths ===
==== Enki's journey to Nippur ====
This myth is one of the shortest and best preserved in the Sumerian language. The first part of the composition is devoted to the praising of Enki's temple in Eridu, while the second one is concerned with Enki's journey to Nippur.

The composition begins with a poetic description of Enki's temple, built from silver and lapis lazuli and decorated with gold. Enki's sukkal Isimud is introduced, and he praises the temple, describing its architecture and enumerating the different kind of musical instruments that play within. The temple itself is portrayed as a mountain floating upon the waters, surrounded by a garden where fruits grow and birds nest. The god then embarks on the journey to Nippur on his boat.

In preparation of the banquet that he is to hold in Nippur, Enki kills oxen and sheep, and brings musical instruments with him. When he arrives in Nippur, he enters the giguna (a sacred part of a temple) and begins to prepare the beer for the banquet. When the preparations are finished, Enki invites the gods to the banquet. An and Enlil are seated in the high place, and Nintu is seated at a place of honor. The gods drink and feast. At the end of the composition, Enlil, pleased by the banquet, gives a blessing praising Enki's temple.

==== Enmerkar and the Lord of Aratta ====
In a passage of the sumerian myth Enmerkar and the Lord of Aratta, with relates the rivalry between Uruk and Aratta and the contests between Uruk's king Enmerkar and the king of Aratta, Enmerkar instructs his messenger to Aratta to recite "the spell of Nudimmud" (line 135). This is followed by a section that most scholars have interpreted as the evocation of this spell (lines 136–155).

Once, there was no snake, there was no scorpion
There was no hyena, there was no lion,
There was neither dog nor wolf,
There was neither fear nor terror,
Mankind had no rival –
At that time, the lands of Subartu (and) Hamazi,
(Lands now of) contrasting-corresponding tongues : Sumer
the great land of the princely attributes
(and) Akkad, the distinguished land,
The land of the Amorites who sleep in the open,
In all of heaven and earth the 'civilized' people
Verily were able to address Enlil in one language.
Thereupon the one who is at the same time lord, prince and king,
Enki who is at the same time lord, prince and king,
He who is at the same time lord, prince and king,
Enki the lord of abundance, the lord who fulfils (his) promises,
The lord of understanding, the wisest of the nation,
The leader of the gods
Displaying wisdom, the lord of Eridu,
In their mouths placed confused languages (and) contention –
The language of mankind which had been one.

— W.W. Hallo (1991), lines 136–155, translation following the interpretation of the "Confusion of tongues".

The translation and interpretation of this passage is the subject of much discussion and debate. Some scholars argue that lines 136–155 are not the evocation of the spell of Nudimmud, and that they are therefore not part of Enmerkar's speech.

One subject of debate in this passage of the myth concerns the actions of Enki. One interpretation, followed by the majority of scholars, is that the passage contains an aetiological story explaining why humankind speaks different languages. According to this interpretation, the past is envisioned as a "Golden Age" where humankind spoke the same language, before Enki changed the speech in their mouths and caused the emergence of a multilingual world. The reason for his actions in this context is also debated.

Another interpretation is that the passage refers to an unification of languages. Alster Bendt and H.L.J. Vanstiphout argue that the incantation calls upon Enki to restore the unity of languages in the future, and specifically to have humankind speak in Sumerian. An unification of the languages, but taking place in the past, has also been proposed by Christoph Uehlinger.

==== Myth of Anzû ====
In the standard Akkadian version of this myth, Ea devises a plan to defeat the Anzû bird, who stole the tablets of destinies from Enlil, after the gods Adad, Girra, and Shara refuse to fight him. Under his advice, the gods summon Ninurta's mother Mami, cover her with honors, name her ''Mistress of all the gods'', Belet-ili, and name her son Ninurta champion of the gods. Belet-ili orders him to go fight the Anzû bird and retrieve the tablets. Ninurta confronts the Anzû bird, however, he is able to use the powers of the tablets to deflect the arrows that Ninurta shoots at him. Ninurta sends Sharur back to Ea to ask for help. Ea instructs him to cut off the feathers of his wings and throw them around, telling him that the Anzû will call the detached feathers back to his wings with a cry, and at this moment, Ninurta's arrows will be able to reach him. Ninurta accomplishes the instructions and is able to kill Anzû.

==== Ninurta and the turtle ====
Enki plays one of the main roles in this Sumerian text, which is the only preserved episode of a larger literary composition connected to the later Akkadian Anzû myth. It differs from this narrative in certain aspects, notably in the fact that here the Anzû bird has stolen the tablet of destinies from Enki instead of Enlil. In this composition, Enki outmaneuvers Ninurta, who, unsatisfied with the reward he received for defeating the Anzû, was plotting against him.

The beginning of the text preserves a short speech of the Anzû, who tells the victorious Ninurta that when Ninurta attacked him at the orders of an unnamed god, likely Enki, the tablets of destinies fell from his grasp and were returned to the Abzû. Ninurta regrets that he couldn't take possession of the tablets and their powers for himself. From his abode, Enki learns of Ninurta's thoughts. The Anzû bird brings Ninurta to the Abzû. Enki first flatters him, lauding him as the victor over the mythical bird, and offers him fame as a reward. Unhappy with his promises, Ninurta begins to secretly plot against Enki, who becomes aware of his plans. After Ninurta raises his hand against Enki's sukkal Isimud in an altercation, Enki fashions a turtle from the clay of the Abzû and stations it next to the gates of the Abzu. He lures Ninurta to this location, and pretends to be ignorant of the situation when he is attacked by the turtle. The turtle digs a pit and pushes Ninurta into it. He is unable to ascend from the pit and Enki taunts him. The mother of Ninurta, who appears here under the name Ninmena, comes to ask for her son's release. Ninmena is identified by Kramer as a name of Ninhursag in this context. Joan Goodnick Westenholz remarks that while in literary texts the name Ninmena was used to refer to her, they were otherwise regarded as distinct goddesses. Here Ninmena refers to Enki as "my Uruku", an unknown epithet of his, the translation of which is uncertain according to Bottéro. Kramer translates this epithet as "my plant-eater" and connects it to the myth Enki and Ninhursag.

==== Nergal and Ereshkigal ====
In this Akkadian myth, which relates how Nergal became Ereshkigal's husband and the King of the Underworld, Ea helps the god elude the dangers of the Underworld. The myth is known from two slightly different versions, a shorter one attested from a Middle Babylonian Manuscript, and a much longer one known from a seventh century source and one from Neo-Babylonian Uruk.

After Nergal fails to pay his respects to the vizier of the queen of the Underworld, Ereshkigal, at a banquet where he represented her, she demands that Nergal be brought before her. In the later version, Ea gives him instructions so he can elude the dangers of the Underworld; he tells him to fashion a chair from different species of wood, and then warns Nergal not to sit, eat, drink or bathe while he is there. Stephanie Dalley proposes that the chair that Nergal takes with him to the Underworld in this version may have had the same purpose as a type of chair called a "ghosts chair", whose purpose, as described in a ritual text, was to prevent seizure by ghosts. While Nergal follows most of Ea's advice, he fails to follow the last one and has sex with Ereshkigal. On the seventh day, while Ereshkigal is asleep, Nergal leaves the Underworld. When Ereshkigal realizes that Nergal has left, she is distraught, and sends her vizier Namtar to ask the gods to send him back, threatening to raise the dead to eat the living if they do not comply. Ea has disguised Nergal, so Namtar does not recognize him, and he goes back to his mistress empty handed. Ereshkigal sees through Ea's scheme, however, and she tells Namtar to seize the disguised god. This time, for an uncertain reason, Namtar fails to identify him. At this point the text breaks. When it resumes, Nergal receives advice from a god, perhaps Ea. He returns to the underworld and reunites with Ereshkigal.

In the Middle Babylonian version, Ereshkigal plans to kill Nergal at his arrival, and Ea gives him seven plagues which he stations by each of the gates of the Underworld. While they hold the gates open, he rushes to the palace and is about to kill Ereshkigal when, to save her life, she offers him her hand in marriage and the rulership of the Underworld, which he accepts.

==== Adapa and the South Wind ====
This myth is known from fragmentary tablets from Tell al-Amarna dating to the fifteenth or fourteenth century BCE, and from Assur dating to the late second millennium BCE.

The myth begins by introducing Adapa, a priest of Ea. He is described as a sage who expertly accomplishes the rites of Eridu and to whom Ea gave wisdom, but not immortal life. One day he embarks on his boat into the sea. The South Wind blows strongly and sinks his boat, and frustrated, Adapa curses it and breaks its wing. On the seventh day, Anu demands to his sukkal Ilabrat where the South Wind has gone, and Ilabrat answers that Adapa broke its wing. Angered, Anu demands that Adapa be brought before him. Ea, made aware of Anu's plans, instructs Adapa to go see the gods Dumuzi and Gizzida who stand before the Gate of Anu while wearing mourning garnments, and to tell them that he is mourning them and their seasonal absence from the earth. This will put them in a good mood, they will accompany him to Anu and put a good word for him. Further, Ea tells Adapa that he must not eat or drink anything that Anu gives him, because it will kill him. Adapa accomplishes the instructions, and ingratiates himself to Dumuzi and Gizzida, who bring him before Anu. Anu demands to know why he broke the South Wind's wing. Adapa answers that he was catching fish for the temple of Ea but that the South Wing created a storm and sank his boat. Dumuzi and Gizzida speak in his favour. Appeased, Anu decides to give him the water and bread of eternal life. However, following the instructions of Ea, Adapa doesn't drink or eat anything, and loses his chance to obtain immortality. Following this, there is a gap of unknown length to the end of the story. An alternate version of the ending of the story preserved on another fragment has Anu give Adapa eternal fame instead of eternal life.

The meaning of the myth is debated among scholars, and many different interpretations have been proposed. In Mesopotamia, the tale was later incorporated into incantations invoking Adapa's powers for curative purposes against illnesses caused by the South Wind.

==== Gilgamesh, Enkidu and the Netherworld ====
The second section of the prologue of this Sumerian poem describes Enki's journey into the Underworld by boat, in an unnamed body of water, when he is suddenly attacked. The reason for Enki's journey is unknown, and its outcome is not told by the poet, either because it was so well known that it did not need to be told, or because it was unimportant to the narrative of this poem. At the end of the composition, when Enkidu is trapped in the Utu to open a passage so Enkidu is able to leave the Underworld.

==== The Death of Gilgamesh ====
In this Sumerian poem, Enki sends a vision to the protagonist, who lies sick on his deathbed. In the vision, he sees the assembly of the gods. They debate over his fate, as while he is a mortal, he is also the son of the goddess Ninsun. Enki says that the only man to receive immortality, Dumuzi, and that a wrestling festival should be set up in his honor. In another passage of the poem, with the advice of Enki, Gilgamesh organizes the building of his tomb with the help of the people of Uruk. The tomb is built in stone in the river bed of the Euphrates, which was diverted for the construction.

In version B of the sumerian poem Gilgamesh and Huwawa, Enki provides Gilgamesh with advice on how to defeat Huwawa, apparently speaking it through Enkidu.

In an atypical variant of the Epic of Gilgamesh preserved from the fragment of a tablet dated to the beginning of the Middle Babylonian period and perhaps originating in the realm of the First Sealand dynasty, the name of Enkidu is replaced by ^{d}40, elsewhere used to represent Ea, and the name of Gilgamesh is replaced by ^{d}30, elsewhere used to represent Sîn. Uruk is replaced by Ur in this variant. The reason for these substitutions is unclear. The preserved parts of the story are the passages relating Enkidu's initiation into human culture and the interpretation of Gilgamesh's dreams by his mother.

==== Others ====
Enki plays a supporting role in the Sumerian literary composition on the Gudea Cylinders, which relates the building of the temple of Ningirsu by Gudea of Lagash. As a wisdom and craftsmanship god, he plays an active role in the construction process, and alongside deities of his circle, he makes the final preparations for the temple before the arrival of Ningirsu. He blesses the E-ninnu at the inauguration banquet.

Ea appears in a portion of a myth focused on Zarpānītum preserved from a small fragment of a tablet of uncertain date. He tells his son Marduk that she is suited to be his bride and that they should rule the sea together.

Ea is mentioned under the hellenized form of his name, Aos, in an extract from a text composed by Eudemus of Rhodes and preserved in the writings of Damascius. According to Eudemus, in Babylonian cosmology Aos was regarded as the brother of Anos (Anu) and Ilinos (Enlil), as well as the father of Bēlos (Marduk) with Daukē (Damkina). His parents are here Kissarē (Kishar) and Assōros (Anshar). The account given by Eudemus offers parallels to that of the Enūma Eliš, though they are not identical; Aos is notably the brother of Anos as opposed to his son. The source that Eudemus used was likely related to the Babylonian Epic.

A Babylonian text preserved from fragments dating either to the Seleucid or the Parthian period possibly attests of a succession myth between an older and a younger generation of gods involving Ea. Here he is the son of Anu and the brother of Ninamakalla. He and his sister are seemingly responsible for the murder of Anshar, a god of the older generation.

=== Hurrian myths ===
Ea plays a supporting role in the Kumarbi cycle. The cycle includes several compositions in both Hittite and Hurrian. Alfonso Archi argues that these compositions were transmitted from the Hurrians to the Hittites around the fourteenth century BCE, at a time when Hittite culture was significantly influenced by that of its neighbours. Its story centers on the conflict between the god Kumarbi and his son Teshub for kingship over the gods. Ea's characterization is the same as in Babylonian myths; he appears as a resourceful god who finds solutions to difficult situations. His behavior changes in the different compositions; he appears as an ally of Kumarbi in the Song of LAMMA, criticizes both sides for the destruction they cause in the Song of Hedammu, and finally helps Teshub in the Song of Ullikummi.

In the Song of Emergence, Ea helps facilitate the birth of several deities, including that of the future king of the gods, Teshub. The composition begins by relating the succession of three kings of the gods, Alalu, Anu, and Kumarbi, each overthrown by the previous one. After Kumarbi becomes pregnant with several deities, including Teshub, as a result of biting off Anu's genitals during their fight, he seeks the help of Ea in Nippur. A conversation takes place between Ea, Kumarbi, Anu and Teshub to determine how he should exit Kumarbi's body. Teshub is finally born from Kumarbi's head while the god of the river Tigris is born from another place. Kumarbi then tells Ea to give him Teshub so he can devour him. In a broken section of the narrative, a rock is substituted for Teshub, and he escapes death. In a later section of the text, a discussion takes place between the gods to determine who will become their king. Teshub is frustrated by the turn of the conversation and he curses several gods, including Ea. His bull Šeri cautions him against cursing the gods, singling out Ea in particular. The fact that Šeri singles out Ea among the gods which Teshub should not curse may indicate that either he was at the time not aligned with Kumarbi and could still be won over, or that Sheri judges him to be an especially dangerous opponent. Another god later tells Ea about Teshub's curses, and Ea answers by an expression which perhaps means that any god cursing him does so at their own risk. After a large gap, another fragmentary section of the composition deals with the labours of a pregnant Earth, and Ea rewards the messenger who brings him the news of the successful birth of her children.

In the Song of LAMMA, Ea plays the role of a kingmaker. At the beginning, he and Kumarbi raise the eponymous deity to the kingship of the gods. The goddess Kubaba proposes that LAMMA meets the Primeval Gods, but he refuses. Ea and Kumarbi become dissatisfied with their choice of LAMMA as king. Ea enters in communication with the Primeval Gods Nara-Napsara down in the Underworld, and tells them of a scheme to overthrow him. In the end, LAMMA is defeated by Teshub, but due to the badly preserved nature of this portion of the narrative, it is uncertain how exactly the Storm-god succeeded.

In the Song of Hedammu, Ea becomes troubled by the destruction caused to mortals by the conflict between Kumarbi and Teshub. He reprimands both sides, pointing out the necessity of human worship of the gods and their offerings. Kumarbi is furious that Ea has admonished him in the assembly of the gods. Hoffner suggests that this moment may be the turning point in the narrative where Ea and Kumarbi's alliance breaks off, as in the Song of Ullikummi, Ea instead helps Teshub defeat Kumarbi's champion Ullikummi.

In the Song of Ullikummi, following his previous attempts to raise a ruler in order to supplant Teshub, Kumarbi engenders Ullikummi with a giant rock. Teshub and his allies confront Ullikummi, but they are defeated. Tašmišu advises Teshub to travel to the Abzû and ask Ea for help. Ea uncovers the source of Ullikummi's strength; he grows on the right shoulder of the giant Ubelluri, "on whom the heaven and earth are built". He was placed there as an infant by the Irsirra deities to hide him from Teshub and his allies. Ubelluri was unaware of the identity of the god on his shoulder, and he did not notice his presence at first, until he began to feel pain. In order to cut off Ullikummi from Ubelluri, Ea and the Primeval Gods use the primeval copper cutting tool which was used to cut apart heaven and earth. After a break in the text, Ea expresses sadness for the many lives lost during the conflict. Teshub is then apparently able to defeat Ullikummi, though the end of the text is partially broken.

In the poem Ea and the Beast, Ea is engaged in a dialogue with an animal of unknown nature, the suppalanza.

The beast makes a prophetic speech announcing the birth and rise of a new god who will become the ruler of the gods, while Ea asks him questions in return. Ea is here depicted as seemingly ignorant of the situation, a portrayal which differs from his usual role as a knowledgeable counselor to the gods.

Archi argues that the poem is a part of the Kumarbi cycle due to similarities between their narratives, including the impregnation of someone with several deities and the manner of their conception and birth. He proposes that the new god prophesied by the beast is Teshub. Ian Rutherford remarks that the beast's question to Ea "don't you know?", parallels Ea's question to Ubelluri in the song of Ullikummi "don't you know, Ubelluri?" and proposes that Ea's behaviour here is explained by the poet's intention to create a parallel with the song of Ullikummi. He suggests that this might be an argument in favour of classifying the poem as part of the Kumarbi cycle, as it would explain Ea's apparent character development in the different songs, from an ally of Kumarbi to an ally of Teshub.

== See also ==
- Ancient Near East
- Eridu
- Capricornus
- Aquarius (constellation)
- Me (mythology)
- Mesopotamian mythology
