= Enbilulu =

Mesopotamian god of irrigation

Enbilulu (Sumerian: 𒀭𒂗𒁉𒇻𒇻 ^{d}EN-bi.lu.lu) was a Mesopotamian god associated with irrigation, and by extension with both canals and rivers. The origin of his name is unknown, and there is no agreement among experts in which way he was related to the similarly named deities Bilulu and Ninbilulu. While originally an independent deity, he eventually came to be seen as a name of Marduk and is mentioned in this role in the Enūma Eliš.

== Character ==
The meaning of the term bilulu is not known, but it appears in two other names of deities as well, Ninbilulu, known from Early Dynastic sources (including the Zame Hymns), and Bilulu, known from the myth Inanna and Bilulu. It has been proposed that there was originally only one deity, Bilulu, who was female and later split into male Enbilulu and female Ninbilulu. However, the identification of Enbilulu and Bilulu is "problematic" according to Wilfred G. Lambert, as "the character of the goddess (...) is not sufficiently similar to that of Enbilulu for the matter to be sure." Another possibility is that Ninbilulu and Enbilulu were the same deity, whose gender either changed after the Early Dynastic period from female to male or who was regarded as male all along. The sign NIN, while conventionally translated as "queen" or "mistress", did not necessarily denote name as belonging to a female deity.

It has been argued that the theoretical original Bilulu was a personification of the storm or of rain clouds. However Enbilulu only rarely is mentioned in association with rain. Frans Wiggermann instead proposes the word bilulu refers to rushes.

Enbilulu was chiefly associated with irrigation and with the water of both canals and rivers. He could be called the "canal inspector of heaven and earth." He has been described as a "purely agricultural deity". Lambert compared him to Enkimdu.

== Worship ==
Ninbilulu, who according to Antoine Cavigneaux and Manfred Krebernik might be the same deity as Enbilulu, appears in the Early Dynastic Fara and Abu Salabikh god lists and in a zame hymn from the same period in relation with Tigris, Euphrates and other sources of water, but without a cult center listed. Daniel Schwemer proposes that Enbilulu originally belonged to the pantheon of Eridu. Wilfred G. Lambert considered him to be a deity associated with the city of Babylon. In the Esagil temple complex, a seat was dedicated to him jointly with Enmesharra. It bore the name du_{6}.ki.sikil, "mound, pure place."

An exorcistic text from the late first millennium BCE assumed to originate in Der lists Enbilulu alongside multiple other agricultural deities, such as Urash, Ennugi and Ningirsu, and implores all of them to protect a field.

A Hittite scribe named Ḫanikkuili, son of a man bearing the Mesopotamian name Anu-šar-ilan, described himself as a servant of Enbilulu in a colophon of a text about Naram-Sin he copied.

== Mythology ==
In the myth Enlil and Ninlil Enbilulu's parents are the eponymous deities, Enlil and Ninlil, while his brothers are Nanna, Nergal and Ninazu, In other sources he could instead be considered as a son of Ea.

In the myth Enki and the World Order, Enbilulu is entrusted with taking care of the Euphrates and the Tigris by the eponymous god. Enki himself is apparently responsible for their debit in the same narrative, though it is Enbilulu who regulates them.

A single incantation credits Enbilulu with being responsible for the creation of the order of days, week and months, a role usually attributed to the moon god Sin (Nanna). Linguistic analysis indicates it was composed in the Middle Babylonian period, but the only known tablet might be a late copy.

== Enbilulu as a name of Marduk ==
In the Enūma Eliš, Enbilulu is one of the names bestowed upon Marduk. Wilfred G. Lambert noted that Enbilulu appears to be one of the names among the fifty which can be considered "major," as it originally belonged to a fully distinct deity. He considers Asalluhi, Tutu and Šazu to be the other names belonging to this category. It is uncertain how Enbilulu came to be absorbed by Marduk. It has been proposed that Marduk was first equated with Adad of Babylon, mentioned as a distinct deity in year names of Hammurabi and Samsu-iluna, and then by extension with Enbilulu. There is however no direct evidence that Adad was ever called Enbilulu in Babylon, and Daniel Schwemer notes that the only source suggesting an equation between them is late and only offers an explanation of Enbilulu's character as Adad-like.

Enūma Eliš describes Enbilulu as a deity who is responsible for the distribution of water and thus for the preservation of pastures and crops. The variant name Enbilulu-Epadun is specifically connected with irrigation canals. Two further names, Enbilulu-Gugal and Enbilulu-Hegal, are linked with abundance. The enumeration of variant Enbilulu names is followed up by Sirsir.

Identification of Marduk and Enbilulu is also known from other sources, such as the incantation series Udug Hul, the oldest examples of which are known from the late second millennium BCE. The god list An = Anu ša amēli refers to him as Marduk ša patati, "Marduk of the canals." He is also listed as the Sumerian counterpart of Marduk in an Emesal vocabulary.

In a single hymn, Enbilulu occurs as a name of Nabu rather than Marduk.
