= Mushdamma =

Mušdam(m)a, inscribed ^{d}muš-dam-ma, and titled šidim gal ^{d}en-líl-lá-ke_{4}, "the great builder of Enlil,” was an ancient Mesopotamian divine architect who was appointed as patron god of house construction by Enki in the myth “Enki and the World Order.”

== Mythology ==
In his long list of divine appointments in “Enki and the World Order,” his assignment of the god Mušdama is described:

He tied down the strings and coordinated them with the foundations, and with the power of the assembly he planned a house and performed the purification rituals. The great prince put down the foundations, and laid the bricks. Enki placed in charge of all this him whose foundations once laid do not sag, whose good houses once built do not collapse, whose vaults reach up into the hart of the heavens like a rainbow – Mušdama, Enlil’s master builder.

— Enki and the World Order, lines 341–8

He is assigned as building constructor to the role of mason given to Kulla, the brick-god.
