= Kulla (god) =

Kulla, inscribed in cuneiform as ^{d}SIG_{4}, where SIG_{4} was the Sumerogram for the Akkadian word libittu, meaning “brick,” was the Sumero-Babylonian brick-god who was invoked alongside Mušdam, the divine architect at the outset when laying a foundation for a building, but consequently banished when construction work was completed in elaborate incantation rituals which formed a part of the exorcist's curriculum. He was formed from a piece of clay that Ea had pinched off in the primeval ocean, in a tale recited as part of the ritual for restoring a temple, “when Anu created heaven.”

== The rituals ==
The earliest attestations to the god whose specialty was to govern the fashioning of bricks and supervise the building process from start to finish was in the Sumerian myth 'Enki and the World Order' from the First Dynasty of Isin which recalls that Enki put Kulla in charge of the pickaxe and brick-mold. He was invoked when the laying of the foundation of buildings, and shooed-away upon their completion, lest his presence cause further construction to be required and other building work elsewhere to be neglected. In a ritual for the repair of a temple, the invocation is described:

[I]f one has to open the foundations of a house, in a propitious month, on a favourable day, when he opens the foundations and lays the brick … you set up an offering arrangement to Kulla, the lord of foundations and brickwork, set out a censor of juniper, libate fine beer, scatter pressed-out sesame, cedar resin, cypress oil, honey, milk, wine, all kinds of stone, silver, gold and all kinds of aromatics into the River god, sacrifice a ram and pour its blood into the foundations.

In Esarhaddon’s account of the laying of the foundations of Esagil, he recalls:

I performed pure sacrifices to the great gods and Kulla, the lord of the fundament and the brickwork, I laid their foundations [upon a … mixed with] wind and choice beer, and made their superstructure durable.

A second ritual was often performed at the end of the work to drive away the god, with him unceremoniously “loaded” onto a boat and banished to the netherworld with incantations. The construction crew, too, were forbidden to approach the building for three days. Alternatively the divinities were thanked for their assistance and bidden to return from whence they came.
