= Kulullû =

Mythical Creature

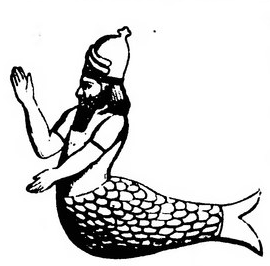
Relief of a Mesopotamian fishman (Kulullû)

Kulullû, inscribed 𒄩𒇽𒍇𒇻, "Fish-Man", was an ancient Mesopotamian mythical monster possibly inherited by Marduk from his father Ea. In later Assyrian mythology, he was associated with kuliltu, "Fish-Woman", and statues of them were apparently located in the Nabû temple in Nimrud, ancient Kalhu, as referenced on a contemporary administrative text.

== Ritual uses ==
He had the head, arms and torso of a human and the lower body and tail of a fish and was portrayed in sculptures found in palaces and on kudurrus. With a bitumen smeared clay figurine, he seems to have found special purpose attracting prosperity and divine benevolence to households, as his icon was inscribed ri-da hi-ṣib KUR-i er-ba taš-mu u ma-ga-ru, "come down abundance of the mountain, enter intercession and compliance".

He appears in Mesopotamian iconography from the Old Babylonian period onward. The Agum-Kakrime Inscription places his apotropaic icon on the gate of the ká-su-lim-ma, the chamber of Marduk and his divine consort Zarpanītu. He was one of the eleven monstrous spawn of Tiāmat in the Epic of Creation, Enûma Eliš. He is one of the demons listed in tablet VIII of the Šurpu incantation series, the ritual to counter a curse of unknown origin. He also features in a hymn to Marduk and the gods of the Esagila.

His depiction in Assyrian reliefs is limited to a marine scene in Sargon II's palace at Khorsabad, ancient Dur-Šarru-kên, a small relief at Tell Halaf and on an ornamental brass ring found at Har Sena'im, an Ituraean cult site on the southern slopes of Mount Hermon.

== See also ==
- Mermaid (Ninurta)
