= Ningikuga =

Mesopotamian goddess

Ningikuga was a Mesopotamian goddess. Her name can be explained as nin-gi-kug-a(k), "lady of the pure reed".

A tradition according to which Ningikuga was a wife of Enki is known. In the Old Babylonian An = Anum forerunner she occurs in his circle after Damgalnuna, while in An = Anum itself she is outright equated with her. In the latter list she appears in line 178 of tablet II, before Ninti.

In two sources, an Old Babylonian balbale composition and in a love song, Ningikuga is the name of Ningal's mother. By extension, she functioned as the grandmother of Inanna. While Thorkild Jacobsen assumed that the mother of Ningal and the spouse of Enki were the same goddess, Antoine Cavigneaux and Manfred Krebernik keep the two uses of the name separate. Jacobsen also argued that based on the meaning of Ningikuga's name it can be assumed that both she and her daughter were associated with reeds and marshes.

Line 28 of tablet III of An = Anum explains Ningikuga as a name of Ningal. A single hymn to Inanna also uses the name Ningikuga to refer to a manifestation of this goddess, and describes her as "the mistress of all, the pure one, who purifies the earth".
