= Asalluhi =

Mesopotamian god

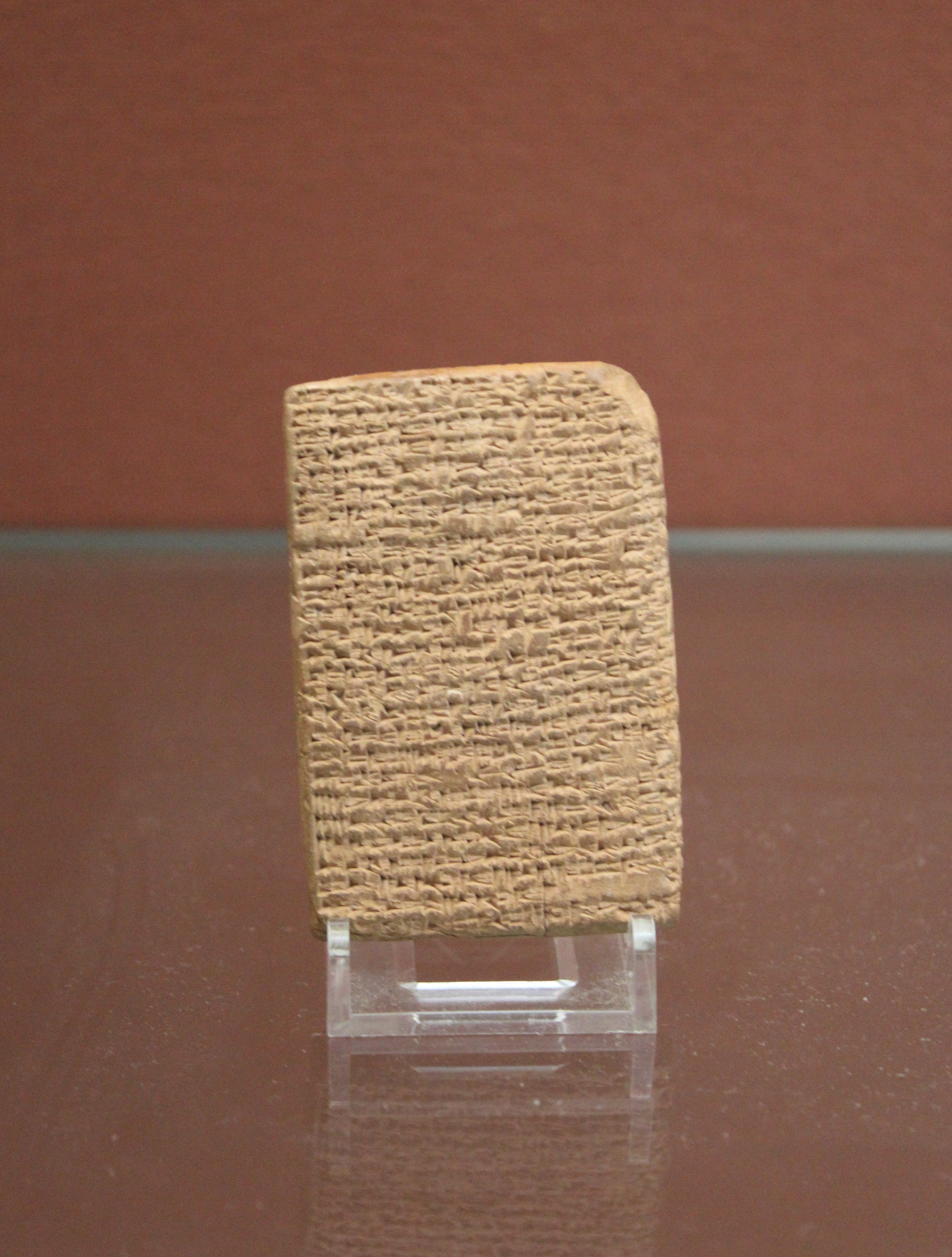
Clay tablet with a Sumerian spell against demons, calling on Asalluhi, god of magic. Old Babylonian Period (2000-1600 BC).

Asalluhi, also spelled as Asarluhi or Asalluhe, also known as Asaralimnuna, Asaralim, Asalim or Asarnuna was a Mesopotamian god primarily associated with the sphere of incantations and exorcism, commonly operating together with his father Enki. He is likely the same deity as Asar, who was attested starting from the third millennium BCE.

During the Old Babylonian period, Asalluhi gradually became syncretized with Marduk, eventually becoming another name for Marduk.

== Name ==
The name Asalluhi is written phonetically as ^{d}asal-lú-ḫi, ^{d}a-sa-lu-úḫ, ^{d}a-sa-lú-ḫi or ^{d}a-sa-al-lú-ḫi. An offering list from Ur III Umma spells the name as ^{d}É.ŠÁRA-lú-ḫi.

The meaning of Asar remains uncertain. Johandi offers two suggestions, that asar(re) could be a-sar-(re(d)) "swift seed" or a-ari-sar "water impregnating the field plots." ^{d}asar is attested in third millennium god lists, personal names and administrative documents, while the name Asalluhi was first attested until the Ur III period. However, the spelling Asalluhi appeared in an incantation against the demon Samana which Finkel dated to the Old Akkadian period. If the dating is right, then Asalluhi was an attested spelling earlier than the Ur III period.

Jacobsen reads lú-ḫi as lú-ḫe, meaning "man-drenching", and thus argues that Asalluhi's name means "man drenching Asal." Lambert proposes that the lú-ḫi element in the name Asalluhi may be a phonetic spelling of luḫe, which the meaning of the root luḫ (purge) would be fitting for Asalluhi’s role in incantations related to exorcism. Johandi offers another explanation that since many of the instructions Enki gives to Asalluhi involves mixing together ingredients, lú-ḫi may have originally been an epithet meaning "the mixer" which eventually connected with the original name Asar to form Asalluhi. lú-ḫi could also have been an ellipsis for lú-ḫe-ĝál/nun, meaning "the one of abundance and plenty."

The Nippur god list from the Old Babylonian period gives Asalluhi another name called Asarag, which could possibly be translated as "the good Asar." This name is unattested elsewhere.

== Character and iconography ==
Asar was already attested in the Third Millennium as part of incantations, albeit playing a minor role.

Asalluhi often appears in incantations in relation to his father Enki. This type of incantation follows the formula where two deities are engaged in a conversation, discussing how to treat the patient. In his studies on incantations, Falkenstein has dubbed it the Marduk-Ea type invocations. However, the name is not very representative of the whole, and Cunningham has shown that the formula was attested earlier in the Fāra and Ebla texts, with Enlil taking the role of Ea and Ningirima taking the role of Marduk. Earlier incantations had Asalluhi send a messenger to Enki to seek support, but starting in the Ur III period Asalluhi started to occasionally directly seek out Enki in his temple to ask for support, possibly emphasizing the mediating role of temples instead of messengers.

The general structure of the Asalluhi-Enki dialogues starts with Asalluhi noticing a problem and reporting to his father Enki. Enki assures Asalluhi that he knows everything that he knows, and then proceeds to instruct Asalluhi on the procedures.

Geller argued that during the Old Babylonian period the incantation priest would assume the role of Asalluhi, who would be acting as the messenger for Enki. Johandi notes that such a translation would not make sense for some of the texts, and there is nothing like the first millennium texts where the priests directly claim to be in the image of Asalluhi/Marduk, although the option still remains possible.

Asalluhi also appears in what is commonly termed the legitimation-type formula as per Falkenstein. The priests will legitimize themselves by establishing them as the representative of the gods. As most of the incantations of this type are directed against demons, Enki and his circle feature prominently among them. The priest would claim that the incantation is the incantation of gods such as Asalluhi, while in other texts they would claim that the gods themselves cast the incantation. Asalluhi is claimed to be the one to recite the "incantation of Eridu" in the Old Babylonian period, whereas in earlier periods the role was assumed by the human priest.

Asalluhi also features in consecration incantations, which prepares objects and materials for rituals. In particular, he seems to appear in preparing objects for purification.

Although in hymns Asalluhi's role as an exorcist is not stated, and outside of incantations his connections with magic are doubtful, his role as a divine exorcist was already well established by the Old Babylonian period. It would still seem that in the Asalluhi-Enki formula, Asalluhi functioned as the executor of Enki's orders, and Asalluhi cannot be called an expert, lacking initiative and needing Enki's encouragement. In other texts, such as a myth, and incantation texts of other formulas like the legitimation-type, though, Asalluhi is described as an exorcist or as the exorcist of the gods.

In the Sumerian Temple Hymns, Asalluhi is described with more aggressive characteristics, listing epithets like "the strong prince", "the hero", and was even described as a leopard and a storm. The other name given to Asalluhi in the hymn, Asaralimnuna can either mean "Asar, the princely bison" or "Asar, the bison of the prince." Johandi notes that this imagery is reminiscent of the young warrior gods archetype, for example Ninurta.

Asalluhi seemed to have a relationship with the deified Shulgi, who was honored in Asalluhi's temple in Kuara. Other texts relate Asar/Asalluhi to deities associated with the underworld and other deified kings, so it is possible that Asalluhi may have had a connection with the underworld.

Jacobsen had argued that Asalluhi was originally a storm god based on the reading of lú-ḫi as lú-ḫe, which would translate the name Asalluhi as "man-drenching Asal," and that Ishkur was also attested with the lú-ḫe epithet. Johandi suggests that it is possible, however there is no other evidence pointing to Asar/Asalluhi originally functioning as a storm god, and points out that a deity being associated with storm imagery does not corroborate to a deity being a storm god with Ninurta being the prime example.

Asalluhi was also said to have granted wisdom to Mesopotamian kings in a couple texts, taking over the role usually reserved for Enki. In Asalluhi A, Asalluhi was described with several traits reminiscent of that of Enki. The sharing of traits with Enki is likely due to the father-son relationship.

In contrast to his usual portrayal as a deity benevolent to humans, some texts, namely Sin-Iddinam's prayer to Ninisina and another Old Babylonian letter relate Asalluhi to plagues. Oshima believes that Marduk was the god related to disease and sickness and Sin-iddinam's prayer is suggestive of Marduk's possible original role before the identification with Asalluhi, but Johandi disagrees and suggests that Asalluhi may have had a similar role prior to the identification with Marduk as the letter was dated quite early (reign of Sumu-abum), although evidence for Asalluhi's role in human sickness is scarce. Asalluhi's implied ability to cancel incantations could also point to a less benevolent side to the god.

== Associations with other deities ==
Asalluhi is considered the son of Enki, likely due to the close proximity between Kuara and Eridu. Although previously it was believed that the earliest attested father-son relationship between Enki and Asalluhi dated to the Ur III period, Johandi noted that the relationship between Asar and Enki dated back the Early Dynastic Period. In an Early Dynastic incantation against snake-bite, Asar sends a man to his father Enki, to which Enki responds that everything he knows, Asar knows too, mirroring the Asalluhi-Enki (Note: Also known as the Marduk-Ea type formula) incantation formula attested later. Asalluhi was identified as Enki's daughter in one text, and twice in a text from Ugarit. However, as Asalluhi is identified as male in every other text from Mesopotamia, this was likely a scribal mistake.

Asar and Asalluhi are commonly believed to be the same god, but Cunningham suggests that Asar and Asalluhi may have originally been separate gods, as an Old Babylonian god list refers to Asar and Asalluhi separately in consecutive lines. Johandi believes that the separation between Asar and Asalluhi was to distinguish Marduk and Asalluhi apart, not Asar and Asalluhi. The possibility cannot be excluded that Asar, Asalluhi and Asaralimnuna were originally different deities, but it is also just as likely that they were the same god.

During the Old Babylonian period, Asalluhi started to be syncretized with Marduk, with Sin-iddinam's prayer to Ninisina offering the earliest evidence of such syncretism. Another Old Babylonian text substitutes "son of Eridu" with "lord of Tintir" as a title for Asalluhi. A hymn to Asalluhi (Asalluhi A) identifies Asalluhi with Marduk. and a hymn to Marduk from Sippar calls him Asalluhi. A prayer made to Marduk/Asalluhi by Hammurabi clearly views the two to be the same deity. Asalluhi is often substituted with Marduk in the Akkadian bilinguals of the incantations starting from the Old Babylonian period, although some bilinguals still write Asalluhi in the Akkadian version. However, in the Old Babylonian period the syncretism was not yet complete, as one incantation text mentions Marduk and Asalluhi separately and occupying different roles, with Marduk capturing the victim either because of powerlessness or he refused to help, and Asalluhi reporting to Enki and securing a treatment for the victim. Another incantation text against Lamashtu lists Asalluhi and Marduk separately as deterrence to the demon. (Note: There is a possibility that this incantation against Lamashtu dates to a later date, during the Middle Babylonian period.) A prayer for Samsu-iluna also lists Marduk and Asalluhi separately, perhaps as a deliberate policy by Samsu-iluna to reclaim authority over the rebellious south, or as indication that the syncretism was not complete yet during the Old Babylonian period.

It is unclear why Asalluhi and Marduk were syncretized. Sommerfield suggested that both gods had similar traits and were gods of incantations, while Johandi believes that Marduk and Asalluhi were syncretized together for something other than magic. Lambert suggests that Marduk's syncretism with Asalluhi was purely political to make Marduk more respectable.

The name of the wife of Asalluhi was probably Panunanki or Eru(a), judging by how both names were known as alternative names for Marduk's wife Zarpanit. A goddess known as Ninmeḫama appeared together with Asalluhi in The Lamentation for Sumer and Ur. Her actual name could probably be Nin é-HA.A-ke_{4}, meaning "lady of the temple of Kuara." She was likely viewed as Asalluhi's wife, especially as a god list equated Ninmeḫama with Sarpanit.

During the Early Dynastic period, Asar was seemingly associated with other deities, particularly Ashgi and Ishkur. Ninshubur may have also had a connection with Asalluhi. Asalluhi sometimes appears together with Utu in incantation texts, which Johandi interprets as possibly due to influence from syncretism with Marduk, although the sun god was already noted to appear in incantations in connection with deities related to water, including Enki.

== Worship ==
Asalluhi's cult center was the city of Kuara. A text from Abu Salabikh praised Asar-lú-KAL of Kuara, and a hymn praised Asalluhi as the patron god of Kuara, giving him the epithet "highly esteemed prince."

An offering list from Girsu during the Lagash II period lists Asar, who received one sila of princely oil and one sila of dates. Asar/Asalluhi appears in administrative texts from the Ur III period, most commonly from Puzrish-Dagan. Despite being the god of the city of Kuara, in the Ur III texts Ninsun repeatedly receives more offerings than Asalluhi, meaning that Ninsun was likely perceived as the more important deity in Kuara during the Ur III period. Asalluhi appears often with the circle of Enki in offering lists from Nippur and Umma in the Ur III period. It would also seem like Asalluhi received regular offerings in Ur III Girsu. He appears in offering lists from Larsa, Ur and Nippur in the Old Babylonian period, also together with the circle of Enki. As the son and less important god, Asalluhi is generally given fewer offerings than Enki and Damgalnuna. In texts outside of incantations, Asalluhi appears after Enki and Damgalnuna, forming a triad attested since the Ur III period.
