= Ninmada =

Mesopotamian snake charmer deity

- Divine snake charmer
- Member of Šassūrātu

Genealogy
- Siblings: Ninazu

Ninmada was a name applied to two separate Mesopotamian deities, a god and a goddess. The female Ninmada was a divine snake charmer, and in the myth Enki and Ninmah she appears as an assistant of the eponymous goddess. The male Ninmada was called the "worshiper of An" and was regarded as a brother of the snake god Ninazu. It is assumed that these deities could be partially conflated with each other or shared a similar origin, though proposals that there was only one Ninmada are also present in modern scholarship.

== Character ==
The name Ninmada means "lord of the country" or "lady of the country" in Sumerian. Nin is a grammatically neutral term and can be found in the names of both female (Ninisina, Ninkasi, Ninmena) and male (Ningirsu, Ninazu, Ningishzida) deities. Some forty percent of earliest Sumerian deities had such names, including city gods, but also servants and children of major deities.

It is assumed that there were two separate deities named Ninmada, but Antoine Cavigneaux and Manfred Krebernik consider it possible that they either shared the same origin or that they could have been partially conflated. Wilfred G. Lambert considered only the female Ninmada to function as a divine snake charmer. She fulfilled this role in the courts of Enlil and Anu. Frans Wiggermann considers the male Ninmada, the brother of Ninazu, and the snake charmer deity to be one and the same. This view is also supported by Frank Simons, who assumes there was only one Ninmada, both a snake charmer and the "worshiper of An", an epithet assumed to only refer to the male deity by other researchers. The god list An = Anum refers to Ninmada both as a snake charmer and as the "worshiper of An". and apparently considers the deity to be male.

According to Jeremiah Peterson, Ninmada's status as a brother of Ninazu might indicate he was considered to be a deity associated with the underworld. He additionally points out that in different copies of the Nippur god list, Ninmada alternates with Ningishzida, whose association with the underworld is well attested.

== Worship ==
A temple of Ninmada is mentioned in the so-called Canonical Temple List after the temples of Ninkasi, but its location is presently unknown and its name is not preserved.

Male Ninmada appears in an inscription of Gudea as one of the deities invoked to help with the construction of E-ninnu, the temple of Ningirsu in Girsu.

An exorcistic text referred to as "Gattung II" mentions Ninmada, the "worshiper of An." This epithet is assumed to refer to male form of this deity. The same sequence mentions Ninkurra, described as "lord who digs up lapis lazuli," Ninzadim, Ninnisig (the butcher of Ekur), Kusu (a purification goddess), Siris (here labeled as the cook of Anu, an otherwise unknown role), and Nisaba.

Theophoric names invoking Ninmada are also known, for example Ur-Ninmada from Sargonic Adab.

== Associations with other deities ==
Ninmada's brother was Ninazu. Frans Wiggermann notes that this tradition is known from sources from both of Ninazu's cult centers, Eshnunna and Enegi. While Enlil is referred to as their father in the myth How Grain Came to Sumer, Dina Katz points out that it is uncertain if he should specifically be understood as the father of Ninmada and Ninazu, or if he is simply addressed as such because of his senior status among the gods. According to Andrew R. George, the female snake charmer Ninmada could be regarded as a daughter of the brewer goddess Ninkasi, and appears with her in enumerations of Enlil's courtiers.

It has been proposed that male Ninmada can be identified with Umun-šudde (or Lugal-šudde), who appears with Ištaran and Alla in an Emesal litany.

A goddess whose name was written as ^{d}nin-ma-da also appears alongside Dagan in a text from Nippur, possibly as his parhedra (spouse), but it is possible in this case the name should be read as Belet-matim. No other sources which would support the assumption that Ninmada was regarded as related to Dagan are otherwise available.

== Mythology ==
Ninmada appears alongside Ninazu in the myth How Grain Came to Sumer. He is considered to be a male deity in this case. In the beginning of the myth, Enlil restricts the growth of the freshly created grain to mountains in the distant north. Ninazu wants to bring it to the Sumerians living in the south. Since he has no permission to do so, Ninmada advises him to ask the sun god Utu for help, but as the rest of the narrative is not preserved, it is unknown how did he aid them and in which way the crop eventually reached Sumer. Frans Wiggermann notes that the information about grain preserved in the myth appears to match conclusions of archaeologists, as it is assumed domesticated cereals arrived in Mesopotamia from the so-called Hilly Flanks surrounding the area.

Ninmada appears as one of the seven helpers of Ninmah in the myth Enki and Ninmah, alongside Ninimma, Shuzianna, Ninšar, Ninmug, Mumudu and Ninniginna. In this text, all of them are understood as minor goddesses of birth. Ninmah's helpers could be collectively called Šassūrātu. (Note: This term was derived from šassūru, "womb," a Sumerian loanword in Akkadian.) In an Ugaritic god list, they were equated with Hurrian Hutena and Hutellura and local Kotharat. (Note: The latter group is also known Mari, where they were known as Kûšarātum. Their name is derived from the Semitic root kšr, "to be skilled.")
