= Ninkasi =

Mesopotamian goddess of beer

- Goddess of beer
- Other names: ^{d}KAŠ.DIN.NAM (Kurunnītu?)
- Major cult center: Nippur
- Symbol: possibly a cup

Genealogy
- Parents: Enki and Ninti
- Siblings: Siraš
- Children: Meḫuš, Mekù, Ememete, Kitušgirizal, Nušiligga, possibly Ninmada

Ninkasi was the Mesopotamian goddess of beer and brewing. It is possible that in the first millennium BC she was known under the variant name Kurunnītu, derived from a term referring to a type of high quality beer. She was associated with both positive and negative consequences of the consumption of beer. In god lists, such as the An = Anum list and the Weidner god list, she usually appears among the courtiers of the god Enlil, alongside deities such as Ninimma and Ninmada. She could also be paired with Siraš, a goddess of similar character, who sometimes was regarded as her sister. A possible association between her and the underworld deities Nungal and Laṣ is also attested, possibly in reference to the possible negative effects of alcohol consumption.

A number of works of Mesopotamian literature refer to Ninkasi, for example the myths Lugalbanda in the Mountain Cave and Lugalbanda and the Anzud Bird. A hymn dedicated to her, known simply as the Hymn to Ninkasi, is also known. It is commonly discussed and quoted in modern literature.

== Name ==
Ninkasi's name, written in cuneiform as ^{d}Nin-ka-si, means "mistress of beer." The explanation "lady who fills the mouth" has been proposed in the past but according to Reallexikon der Assyriologie und Vorderasiatischen Archäologie should be considered implausible. A possible earlier writing of the name, ^{d}Nin-^{ka_{15}}kaš-si, has been tentatively translated as "mistress barmaid," though its precise etymology remains a matter of debate. Like many other names of deities originating in the Sumerian language, it is assumed to be a combination of the grammatically neutral word nin, which appears in names of both male and female deities, and the name of a product, place or object. In one of the earliest Mesopotamian god lists, some forty percent of the deities have names starting with nin.

It has been proposed that the deity ^{d}KAŠ.DIN.NAM should be understood as a late form of Ninkasi. A second attested spelling of this name is ^{d}KAŠ.DIN.NU. The Sumerian compound KAŠ.DIN represents the word kurun (Akkadian: kurunnum), a type of beer regarded, in Mesopotamian texts, as being of a particularly high quality . According to Paul-Alain Beaulieu, the name was most likely read as Kurunnītu, though Kurunnam has also been proposed. Beaulieu considers the former option to be more likely, as the syllabic spelling ^{d}ku-ru-ni-tu_{4} is also attested. The equivalence between this deity and Ninkasi is directly attested in two lamentations.

== Character ==
Ninkasi was the goddess of beer, and as such was associated with its production, consumption and effects - both positive and negative. Jeremy Black described her as "one of (...) minor deities without a strongly defined personality who merely symbolise the object or phenomenon that they are associated with." While he also described her as a divine barmaid, Manfred Krebernik argues that she was not connected with the sale of beer and with professions related to it.

The proposal that Ninkasi was also associated with wine, common in older literature, is no longer regarded as plausible.

While typically regarded as a goddess, in some late sources Ninkasi could appear as a male deity, a phenomenon also attested in the cases of the artisan goddess Ninmug and Ninshubur, the sukkal (attendant deity) of Inanna.

It is possible that in art Ninkasi was depicted holding a cup. Furthermore, she might be among the deities shown in banquet scenes on items such as gaming boards and fragments of musical instruments.

== Worship ==
Ninkasi was already worshiped in the Early Dynastic period, but there is no evidence that she was the tutelary deity of a specific city at any point in time. She was instead worshiped as a "universal" deity in various parts of Mesopotamia. While a city is mentioned in the Hymn to Ninkasi, it should be understood not as a reference to a hitherto unknown cult center, but rather as a poetic indication that any city where beer was drunk can be considered a city of Ninkasi.

The worship of Ninkasi is attested in Early Dynastic administrative documents from Shuruppak, the cult center of Sud. It is also possible that in the same period she had a sanctuary in Eridu. In the Ur III period, she was worshiped in Umma. She is also well attested as one of the members of the pantheon of Nippur, where she appears for the first time in offering lists from the Ur III period. According to a Middle Babylonian metrological text she had her own temple in this city. Two temples of Ninkasi are mentioned in the Canonical Temple List, but their names are lost and their locations are uncertain. There is also evidence that she was worshiped in Egiparku, a sanctuary of Ningal in Ur. A socle dedicated to her, E-ušumgalanna ("house of the ušumgal," translated by Andrew R. George as "dragon of heaven") was built there by the official Sin-balassu-iqbi, who was active during the period of neo-Assyrian rule over Babylonia, before the rise of the Neo-Babylonian Empire.

Attestations of worship of Kurunnītu are rare. In Nippur she was venerated in the temple of Gula. A festival held in Babylon in honor of the same goddess involved Kurunnītu (^{d}KAŠ.DIN.NAM), as well as Belet Eanna (Inanna of Uruk), Belet Ninua ("Lady of Nineveh"), Ninlil and Bizilla (who both acted as the divine representatives of Kish in this case). A few documents indicate that she was worshiped in Uruk, and the Eanna archive attests that during the reign of Nabopolassar various elements of jewelry were prepared for her statue. Sennacherib plundered a statue of her from Uruk in 693 BC. Another was returned to Der by Esarhaddon. She is also attested in a kudurru (boundary stone) inscription from the reign of Marduk-apla-iddina I.

Theophoric names invoking Ninkasi are already known from the Early Dynastic and Sargonic periods, examples include Amar-Ninkasi and Ur-Ninkasi. The name Kurunnītu appears in two neo-Babylonian theophoric names, both of them feminine: ^{d}KAŠ.DIN.NAM-šarrat and ^{d}KAŠ.DIN.NAM-tabni.

== Associations with other deities ==
Ninkasi's parents were Enki and Ninti, but according to the Hymn to Ninkasi, she was raised by Ninhursag rather than by her mother. Ninhursag was generally not associated with raising children otherwise, and the childhood of deities is typically not described in Mesopotamian texts. It is possible that a deity corresponding to Ninti precedes Ninkasi and Siraš (also known as Siris), another goddess associated with beer, in the Nippur god list.

Ninkasi and Siraš were commonly associated with each other, but the nature of the connection between them varies between sources. In the god list An = Anum they are equated with each other and in a bilingual Neo-Assyrian version of one of the myths about Lugalbanda Ninkasi in the Sumerian version corresponds to Siraš in Akkadian, but in a version of the Weidner god list from Assur with an explanatory column they are stated to be sisters instead. According to Richard L. Litke, a tradition in which Ninkasi was the wife of Siraš, in this case seemingly treated as a male deity, might be attested in a single source, most likely a late copy of an Old Babylonian list of deities, though he notes it might also be interpreted as a reference to the two being sisters instead. According to Manfred Krebernik, no references to either of them having a spouse is known. A further deity associated with both of them was Patindu, a god linked with ritual libations whose name might mean "he who makes the stream of wine sweet."

The god list An = Anum mentions a group of five children of Ninkasi. According to Manfred Krebernik, their names seem to allude to terms related to beer, binge drinking and inebriation: Meḫuš ("glowing me"), Mekù (or Menkù, "beautiful me" or "beautiful crown"), Ememete (or Menmete, "ornate speech" or "ornate crown"), Kitušgirizal ("magnificent seat") and Nušiligga ("not drying up"). Additionally, according to Andrew R. George, the snake charmer deity Ninmada could be regarded as Ninkasi's daughter.

Ninkasi was also regarded as the "brewer of Ekur," and in this role appears in lists of courtiers of Enlil alongside deities such as his scribe Ninimma, his butcher Ninšar, or his snake charmer Ninmada. For example, Ninimma, Ennugi, Kusu, Ninšar, Ninkasi and Ninmada appear in sequence in at least two sources, An = Anum and the Canonical Temple List. Another similar group, consisting of Šuzianna, Nuska, Ninimma, Ennugi, Kusu, Ninšar and Ninkasi appears in an offering list from the Ur III period and in an esoteric explanatory text. It has been proposed that Ninkasi's classification as a deity from the circle of Enlil relied on his link with Nisaba, commonly regarded as his mother in law, who in addition to being a goddess of writing was also associated with grain, which was also indirectly linked to Ninkasi as the main resource used to produce beer. A single document in which Ninkasi appears alongside Šala also likely depends on a similar connection.

The Weidner god list places both Ninkasi and Siraš between Nungal, the goddess of prisons, and Laṣ, the wife of Nergal. Similarly, Kurunnītu in multiple documents appears in association with the goddess Bēlet-balāṭi, who might be a late form of Manungal, and as such was likely an underworld deity. It has been proposed that this possible association between beer and underworld deities was meant to serve as a reflection of negative effects of alcohol consumption.

In the incantation series Šurpu Ninkasi appears alongside the fire god Gibil, possibly in reference to the use of fire in beer production, though it has been called into question if it was necessary, and experiments show that it is plausible that Mesopotamian brewers relied on cold mashing. A grouping of Ninkasi, Irḫan, Šakkan and Ezina is also attested, but the reasons behind the juxtaposition of these deities are not known.

== Literature ==
=== Hymn to Ninkasi ===
A hymn dedicated to Ninkasi is known. A translation was published by Miguel Civil in 1964, with later revisions made in 1991. It is commonly quoted in professional literature today. Three copies are presently known, one from Nippur and two from unknown locations. Due to lack of references to historical events and the purposely archaic style of literary texts it is not possible to precisely date the composition of the hymn, but it is agreed that the known tablets come from the Old Babylonian period.

It is assumed that it is a poetic description of the process of brewing. It indicates that the main ingredient used was bappir, presumably a type of bread, assumed to be dry and similar to modern biscotti. However, recent studies conducted by archaeologist Adelheid Otto, brewing technician Martin Zarnkow and Assyriologist Walther Sallaberger indicate that the instructions given in the hymn as usually translated do not fully align with known information about the production of beer in ancient Mesopotamia, which creates the need for further analysis and a retranslation of fragments of the composition in accordance with newer discoveries. Sallaberger argues that the term bappir is likely to refer to sourdough. It is also likely that the references to honey present in the hymn are a purely literary device meant to highlight the quality and aroma of beer prepared by Ninkasi, as it was an expensive luxury good and as such was not used to prepare any ordinary drinks. In administrative texts, only barley and occasionally emmer products are attested as ingredients used in brewing, not honey or herbs. Even researchers who do assume aromatics were actually used admit it is uncertain if the flavor would survive fermentation.

=== Other texts ===
In the myth Lugalbanda and the Anzud Bird, the eponymous hero describes Ninkasi and her activity in detail while planning a banquet for the Anzû's family. He refers to her as "the expert woman, who redounds to her mother's credit," and states that her fermenting vat is made of lapis lazuli, while her cask - from silver and gold. According to Jeremy Black, the passage about the goddess should be understood as a part of an elaborate metaphorical description of beer Lugalbanda plans to serve, and she is not herself a participant in the events of the myth. She is also referenced in passing in Lugalbanda in the Mountain Cave, where at one point "the wooden dahaša (a type of vessel) of Ninkasi" puts the hero to sleep, which is most likely another metaphor pertaining to the consumption of beer.

A fragment of a myth known from Abu Salabikh mentions Ninšar slaughtering cattle and sheep while Ninkasi brewed beer.

Ninkasi is one of the eight deities born in the end of the myth Enki and Ninhursag. Her name is reinterpreted as a pun on the word ka, "mouth," in this composition, and like in the other passages her birth corresponds to Enki announcing a specific body part. Ninti makes a similarly brief appearance as her sister, rather than mother, according to Dina Katz because the names of the eight deities in this scene were "not selected for theological reasons but to suit body parts," with Ninti's name being reinterpreted as a pun on the word ti, "rib."

== Modern relevance ==
The asteroid 4947 Ninkasi, discovered in 1988 by Carolyn S. Shoemaker and Eugene Merle Shoemaker at the Palomar Observatory, is named after the goddess.

Ninkasi Brewing Company from Eugene, Oregon, founded in 2006, is named after her as well. As of 2013, it was the third largest craft beer brewery in the state.

The American Homebrewers Association annually issues a "Ninkasi Award" during their National Homebrew Competition.

== See also ==
- History of beer
