= Hutena and Hutellura =

Hurrian goddesses

- Goddesses of fate and divine midwives
- Major cult center: Halab, Ugarit, Hattusa

Equivalents
- Ugaritic: Kotharat
- Mesopotamian: Šassūrātu
- Hittite: Gulšeš and DINGIR.MAH

Hutena and Hutellura (also spelled Hudena and Hudellura; ḫdn ḫdlr in alphabetic Ugaritic texts) were goddesses of fate and divine midwives in Hurrian mythology.

== Number ==
An unresolved problem in scholarship is the number of goddesses referred to with the names "Hutena and Hutellura." Piotr Taracha notes that only two figures depicted on the Yazılıkaya reliefs are labeled as such, but at the same the names appear to be plural. However, he also notes that based on equations in god lists the name Hutellura seemed to refer to a singular goddess, corresponding to Mesopotamian Ninmah, Nintu or Aruru. He concludes that it can be assumed they were a pair worshiped together, like Ninatta and Kulitta or Ishara and Allani.

Alfonso Archi assumes that the development of Hutena and Hutellura in Hurrian religion was influenced by the Syrian midwife goddesses, known as Kotharāt in Ugarit or Kûšarātum in Mari (both derived from the Semitic root kšr, "to be skilled"), who were regarded as a group of seven. According to god lists, Hutena and Hutellura were equated both with them and with Šassūrātu (derived from šassūru, "womb," a Sumerian loanword in Akkadian), assistants of the Mesopotamian birth goddess. As attested in the myth Enki and Ninmah, the latter group consisted of seven goddesses: Shuzianna, Ninimma, Ninmada, Ninšar, Ninmug, Mumudu and Ninnigina. On this basis, he proposes that Hutena and Hutellura should also be understood as a heptad.

== Character ==
Emmanuel Laroche proposed that their names are both derived from the Hurrian verb ḫut, perhaps to be translated as "to favor." Another proposed translation for the root word is "to raise." Alfonso Archi suggests the translation "those of favoring" for Hutena and notes that while derived from the same root, Hutellura most likely needs to be understood as analogous to the word hutelluri, "midwife." He assumes the names reflected their benevolent nature.

A connection existed between Allani and Hutena-Hutellura, possibly due to the belief that the determination of each person's fate took place in the underworld.

While in theory it can be assumed that Hutena-Hutellura were regarded as responsible for premature deaths, such cases were often explained as divine wrath affecting a community. The character of the fate goddesses themselves was regarded as benevolent.

In addition to determining fates, Hutena and Hutellura were also goddesses of birth and midwifery. As such, they were likely believed to be responsible for shaping the fetus during pregnancy.

== Worship ==
Hutena and Hutellura appear in kaluti (offering lists) of the goddess Hebat and her circle, usually following her servant Takitu and preceding the pair Ishara and Allani. In the Yazılıkaya sanctuary, they are likewise placed right behind Hebat, her daughters and Takitu, with the figures representing them labeled as 47 and 48 in modern scholarly sources. An exception is known from the Hurrian offering lists from Ugarit, where Hebat is followed by Ishara and Allani, while Takitu, Hutena and Hutellura are placed behind this pair.

Hutena and Hutellura were most likely originally incorporated into Hebat's court in ancient Aleppo.

In rituals they could also appear in relation to Ea, Damkina and Izzummi (the Hurrian name of Isimud), who in Anatolia were part of the Hurrian pantheon.

== Mythology ==
Hutena and Hutellura appear in the myths Song of Hedammu and Song of Ullikummi, both of which belong to the cycle of Kumarbi. In the latter text, they are present during the birth of the eponymous stone monster, and present him to his father Kumarbi.

In Hittite translations both of this cycle and other Hurrian myths and ritual texts they are substituted with the Gulšeš and DINGIR.MAH.
