= Kotharat =

Heptad of Syrian goddesses

- Tutelary goddesses of marriage, conception, pregnancy and birth
- Major cult center: Mari, Ugarit
- Parents: hll (Hulelu?)

Equivalents
- Mesopotamian: Šassūrātu
- Hurrian: Hutena and Hutellura

Kotharat (Ugaritic: 𐎋𐎘𐎗𐎚, kṯrt) were a group of seven goddesses associated with conception, pregnancy, birth and marriage, worshiped chiefly in the northern part of modern Syria in the Bronze Age. They are attested in texts from Mari, Ugarit and Emar. There is no agreement among translators over whether they had individual names in Ugaritic tradition. They were considered analogous to the Mesopotamian Šassūrātu, a collective term referring to assistants of the goddess Ninmah, and to Hurrian Hutena and Hutellura. It has been suggested that the latter were at least in part patterned after the Kotharat.

== Name ==
The name Kotharat (Kôṯarātu) is a conventional vocalization of Ugaritic kṯrt. Spellings such as Kathiratu and Katiratu is also used in modern literature. Other forms of the name of the Kotharat are attested in texts from Mari: the older Kawašurātum (^{d}kà-ma-šu-ra-tum) and more recent Kûšarātum (^{d}ku-ša-ra-tum). In Emar, they were known as "Ilū kašarāti" (DINGIR^{MEŠ} ka-ša-ra-ti). All of these names are most likely derived from the Semitic root kšr, "to be skilled" or "to achieve," which is attested in West Semitic languages and in Akkadian. Its other derivatives include the name of the god Kothar, the Ugaritic word kṯr, "wise" or "cunning," and Hebrew kôšārāh, "luck" or "prosperity." Possible cognates, ku-ša-ri and ku-šar, have also been identified among theophoric elements known from Akkadian personal names.

Ugaritic texts indicate that the word Kotharat is plural, and it is conventionally assumed that it refers to a group of seven goddesses. However, occasionally smaller number, either four or six, is postulated as an alternative.

=== Possible individual names ===
Individual names of the Kotharat might be attested in the Ugaritic myth Marriage of Nikkal and Yarikh. Gabriele Theuer restores them as follows: ṯlḫh, mlgh, yṯtqt, bq’t, tq’t, prbḫṯ, dmqt. Wilfred G. E. Watson gives a similar list, but excludes yṯtqt. However, not all experts agree that these words are given names. Theuer, who accepts that each of these words is the name of a single goddess, considers ṯlḫh either a cognate of Hebrew šillûḥîm, which might refer to dowry, or alternatively of Akkadian šalāḫu, "to tear out," which she assumes might indirectly refer to removing the infant from mother's womb. She points out the similarity between mlgh and Akkadian mulugu, a term referring to the property a bride brought from her father's house. The word yṯtqt might be derived from the root ṯtq, possibly "to split off," "to separate," and as such designate the goddess as a responsible for cutting the umbilical cord. Similarly, the root bq’, from which bq’t might be derived, refers to splitting, and possibly refers specifically to splitting the womb in this context. The term tq’t is most likely derived from tq’, "to hit with a hand," presumably referring to enthusiastically clapping hands to celebrate the birth of a child or possibly indirectly alluding to determination of a favorable fate. The compound prbḫṯ according to Theuer is presently impossible to translate and might be a Hurrian loanword in Ugaritic. Finally dmqt, seemingly designated as the youngest of the Kotharat, might mean "the good" or "the kind" and like tq’t refer to the ability to determine a positive fate for the infant. Aicha Rahmouni assumes that dmqt might instead refer to the whole group, not necessarily to a single goddess, and translates it as either "fairest ones" or "fairest one."

Another translator, David Marcus, does not assume that the passage refers to individual goddesses:

Let her partings gift and dowry
Be weighed out (?) for her
Bursts (?) of handclapping for prbḫṯ,
The fairest and youngest of the Kotharat.

He argues that prbḫṯ is the name of a mortal woman, presumably a bride, poetically compared to one of the Kotharat. This interpretation is also supported by John Gibson, who presumes the Kotharat are invoked to bless her in her marriage. He considers it possible that the text was recited during wedding ceremonies in Ugarit and the name prbht is simply a placeholder.

== Character ==
The Kotharat were chiefly associated with conception, pregnancy and birth. They were believed to be responsible for forming human children during pregnancy. Additionally, literary texts indicate that they blessed marriages. They are also sometimes characterized as divine midwives in modern literature. However, Dennis Pardee objects to this description, arguing that in known myths the Kotharat appear to only intervene before pregnancy.

One of the Ugaritic texts describes them with the term snnt. Especially in older literature, it is often assumed to be a cognate of Akkadian sinuntu, "swallow." However, many researchers, for example Dennis Pardee and Aicha Rahmouni, favor the explanation "shining" or "brilliant," based on similarity to Arabic sanā, "to shine," "to gleam" or "to be exalted" (used to refer to stars), as well as its Aramaic cognate referring to refining metal or glittering. The proponents of the latter theory point out that there is no precedent for Ancient Near Eastern deities being referred to as "swallows," while various epithets highlighting luminosity are attested in Mesopotamian and Eblaite texts, as well as in the Hebrew Bible.

== Associations with other deities ==
According to Ugaritic texts, the god hll was the father of the Kotharat. The vocalization of his name is uncertain, though a god named Hulelu, whose origin is presently unknown, was worshiped in Emar and might be related to Ugaritic hll. The meaning of the name is not known, though a similarity with the Arabic word hilālun, "crescent moon", has been pointed out. Based on this possible relation he is often considered an astral deity, possibly a lunar god specifically associated with the crescent phase. Another proposed translation of his name is "star." Dennis Pardee instead suggests the name might mean "purity," while Wilfred G. E. Watson favors "brightness." Yet another theory connects hll with the senior Mesopotamian god Enlil.

Lists of deities from Ugarit and Mari indicate that the Kotharat were understood as analogous to the Lower Mesopotamian Šassūrātu. The sources from the former site additionally attest an equivalence between them and Hurrian Hutena and Hutellura. The term Šassūrātu refers to goddesses regarded as helpers of Ninmah. Both they and the Kotharat appear in offering lists from Mari. Their name is derived from the Akkadian word šassūru, a direct loan from Sumerian meaning "womb" or "midwife." They appear in the myth Enki and Ninmah, where the members of this group are Ninimma, Shuzianna, Ninmada, Ninšar, Ninmug and Ninnigina. They are collectively characterized as "wise and knowing." The latter names refer to a group of Hurrian deities believed to be responsible for determining the fate of humans, also associated with birth and midwifery. Alfonso Archi considers it possible that the Hurrians living in Syria patterned them on the Kotharat and their Mesopotamian counterparts. He assumes that they were a heptad of deities, much like the Kotharat, which is a position also supported by Volkert Haas. However, Piotr Taracha remarks that while both "Hutena" and "Hutellura" are grammatically plural, on the Yazılıkaya reliefs only two figures are identified by them. He also points out that in some cases Hutellura was seemingly treated as a singular goddess analogous to Ninmah.

Wilfred G. E. Watson argues that in the myth Marriage of Nikkal and Yarikh (KTU 1.24), the Kotharat function as handmaidens of the eponymous goddess.

Despite their names being cognates, there is no direct indication in any known sources that the Kotharat were ever associated with the god Kothar.

== Worship ==
The Kotharat originated in inland Syria. They were worshiped by Amorites in various cities located in the north of this region. According to Alfonso Archi, they spread through the Middle Euphrates area in the early second millennium BCE. They are attested in offering lists from Mari. They were also worshiped in Emar, though there is no indication that they had a temple there and they are absent from known theophoric names. Marten Stol also tentatively suggests that a relief from Tell Chuera depicting seven goddesses might be an indication that the Kotharat or a similar group of birth goddesses were worshiped in this location.

The Ugaritic texts also mention the Kotharat. Wilfred G. E. Watson counts them among the principal goddesses of this city of local origin alongside Anat, Ashtart, Athirat and Shapash. In two similar lists of deities (one fragmented), they appear between the pair Arṣu-wa-Šamuma ("Earth and Heaven") and the moon god Yarikh. A single possible theophoric name invoking the Kotharat, bn kṯrt, has been identified as well.

=== Uncertain and disproved attestations ===
Dennis Pardee argues that the genealogy of deities presented by Philo of Byblos might reflect one of the Ugaritic deity list, in which the Kotharat appear after Ilib, Arṣu-wa-Šamuma ("Earth and Heaven") and El, before Dagan. The late Phoenician author mentions seven daughters of Elos/Kronos alongside Elyon, the pair Ge and Ouranos, and Dagon. He additionally argues that the Ugaritic list might reflect a tradition in which their father was El. However, Lluís Feliu concludes that the presence of Kotharat in this document might be the result of a scribal mistake: kṯrt in place of aṯrt (Athirat), the wife of El. He points out that in an analogous list written in the syllabic cuneiform script, the deity occurring between El and Dagan is designated by the logogram ^{d}NIN.MAH, which according to him never designated groups of deities such as Kotharat or Šassūrātu, and as such might refer to a singular deity, the wife of El, instead.

Two purported attestations of the Kotharat postulated by William F. Albright, on a tablet from Beth Shemesh and in verse 7 of Psalm 68, are no longer accepted in modern scholarship.

== Mythology ==
The Kotharat are among the deities appearing in the Ugaritic myth Marriage of Nikkal and Yarikh, sometimes referred to with the title Nikkal and the Kotharat instead. They apparently oversee the birth of a son of Nikkal and Yarikh, and might also be invoked to bless a mortal woman, prbḫṯ due to her own upcoming wedding, though it has also been proposed that the passage enumerates the individual names of the Kotharat.

They also appear in the Epic of Aqhat. They visit the house of Danilu after Baal intercedes on his behalf with El, and grants him a descendant, the hero of the narrative, Aqhat. Danilu holds a six day long feast in their honor. On the seventh day they leave. It is possible they later return to act as midwives during the birth of Aqhat, though this assumption is speculative as a section of the story presumed to describe these events is missing.
