= Ninkurra =

Name of multiple Mesopotamian deities

- Name of multiple Mesopotamian deities

Genealogy
- Children: Ninimma or Uttu (in the myth Enki and Ninhursag)

Ninkurra or Ninkur was a name of multiple Mesopotamian deities, including a divine artisan, presumably a female sculptor. There is no agreement among researchers if this Ninkurra corresponds to the identically named goddess appearing in the myth Enki and Ninhursag. A different deity named Ninkur appears in enumerations of ancestors of Enlil in god lists. This theonym was also employed as a logogram to represent the name of a goddess worshipped in Mari and in Emar on the Euphrates, possibly to be identified as the wife of Dagan, Shalash.

== Ninkurra in southern Mesopotamia ==
The theonym Ninkurra (^{d}nin-kur-ra) or Ninkur (^{d}nin-kur) is sparsely attested in sources from southern Mesopotamia. It is assumed that more than one deity bearing this name existed. According to Dina Katz all of them were female, though in a more recent publication Josephine Fechner and Michel Tanret point out a reference to a male Ninkurra in the god list An = Anum. The character of the deities designated by this name shows a high degree of fluidity, which is likely to reflect the geographic scope of the individual attestations.

=== Craftsman deity ===
Ninkurra (alternatively: Ninkur) appears Weidner god list, An = Anum and ritual texts as a craftsman deity, associated with other similar figures, such as Kulla, Ninmug or Ninagala. Sometimes the collective term ilī mārē ummâni (Akkadian: "gods of the craftsmen") was used to describe a group of such deities. An incantation states that various artisan deities, including Ninkurra, were created by Ea from clay. Ninkurra was regarded as a sculptor, but the material she was believed to work with varies between sources: a Mîs-pî incantation connects her with precious and semi-precious stones, while an inscription of Sennacherib instead mentions limestone.

=== Daughter of Enki ===
In the myth Enki and Ninhursag a goddess named Ninkurra is a daughter of the eponymous god born from an incestuous encounter between him and Ninnisig. Subsequently, she also becomes his victim, and depending on the version, she is either the mother of Ninimma and thus grandmother of Uttu, or the mother of the latter goddess, with Ninimma skipped. According to Dina Katz it remains uncertain why any of the goddesses who appear in this section of the myth were selected by its compilers for their respective roles. Lluís Feliu interprets this version of Ninkurra as a goddess of the mountains based on the literal meaning of her name, and argues she was the same as the craftsman deity, whose role as a divine sculptor according to this theory would point at the origin of the material divine statues were made of. However, Antoine Cavigneaux and Manfred Krebernik consider them to be two separate deities.

=== Husband of Uttu ===
In a late tradition documented in the god list An = Anum Ninkurra, in this case male, appears as the husband of Uttu. According to Cavigneaux and Krebernik this version corresponds to the divine craftsman. Josephine Fechner and Michel Tanret suggest that this Ninkurra might be the same as the deity Nin-NAM.RI, possibly to be read as Ninbirre, explained in An = Anum as a divine seal cutter (^{d}BUR.GUL).

=== Primordial deity ===
Another goddess with the same name, Ninkur, occurs alongside a male deity named Enkur in lists of the so-called "Enki-Ninki deities," the ancestors of Enlil. The pair Enkur-Ninkur is attested in the Old Babylonian An = Anum forerunner, in An = Anum itself, and in a god list known from a copy from Mari, but their exact position among the generations of primordial deities varies.

=== Underworld deity ===
It has been argued that a further deity named Ninkur or Ninkurra was associated with the underworld. In this context, the name would designate her as the "lady of the underworld", as the sign KUR could serve as a designation of the land of the dead. The name might appear in this context in the so-called First Elegy of the Pushkin Museum, in which a man named Ludingira invokes Ninkurra alongside various underworld deities, after Nergal and before Ningishzida, Gilgamesh, Bitu and Etana, to ask them to care for his father in the land of the dead. An identical enumeration of deities is attested independently in three more sources.

Dina Katz notes that while this version of Ninkurra would plausibly have a similar character to Ereshkigal, she is unlikely to be identical with her, as she never appears alongside Namtar; additionally an Old Babylonian god list from Uruk which places her after Ninti and before Lisin seems to treat she was a separate figure from Ereshkigal. She tentatively proposes that she might have been a goddess of similar character originally worshiped further to the north than Ereshkigal, and closely linked to Nergal, possibly as his spouse, though ultimately lack of evidence makes determining the nature of the relations between these three deities impossible. Support for this interpretation has been voiced by Grégoire Nicolet as well.

== ^{d}NIN.KUR in Mari and Emar ==
A further deity represented by the logogram ^{d}NIN.KUR is also attested in Mari, for the first time appearing in a list of bread offerings from the Early Dynastic or Sargonic period. This entry directly precedes "Lugal Terqa," an epithet of Dagan. A further attestation comes from a list of cloth offerings from the reign of Zimri-Lim. However, it is possible that in the Old Babylonian Mari god list, where this name occurs in the end of the section focused on theonyms starting with the sign NIN, the male craftmanship deity is meant.

The name ^{d}NIN.KUR or ^{d}NIN.KUR.RA is additionally well attested in texts from Emar. They attest the existence of a temple (É), a treasury, and additionally a gate and a street named in honor of this deity. This theonym appears in a number of offering lists too. A month named after ^{d}NIN.KUR is attested in the local calendar. A kissu festival dedicated to Dagan, which apparently took place in the nearby settlement Šatappi, involved ^{d}NIN.KUR as well. The nature of this celebration is difficult to ascertain, though since the rites dedicated to ^{d}NIN.KUR involved a nugagtu, sometimes translated as "mourning woman," as well as laying down her statue and making offerings to underworld deities such as Shuwala, it has been proposed that it commemorated the descent and subsequent return of a deity from the land of the dead. However, since much of the evidence is ambiguous, more cautious proposals are also present in scholarship, for example that the kissu commemorated the marriage or symbolic enthronement of the deities involved. Another Emariote ritual dedicated to ^{d}NIN.KUR involved specialists named nagīrtu (the feminine form of Akkadian nagīru, "herald"), though neither the details of its performance nor the role of these women in it is known.

Antoine Cavigneaux and Manfred Krebernik suggest that in both Mariote and Emariote texts the theonym ^{d}NIN.KUR(.RA) should be read as Bēlet-mātim, and that it refers to Shalash, a goddess presumed to be Dagan's usual spouse. Lluís Feliu simply renders it as Ninkur or Ninkurra, but he also notes that a goddess named Ba’alta-mātim appears in texts from Mari in association with Emar, and might be one and the same as ^{d}NIN.KUR. He also concludes that she was a spouse of Dagan, and that she can be identified as Shalash based on the presumed continuity of traditions pertaining to the latter. He points out that the use of ^{d}NIN.KUR to represent her might be related to the logogram ^{d}KUR being used to write the name of Dagan in the areas located around the middle of the Euphrates. Additionally, he considers it possible that ^{d}NIN.KUR was understood as a synonym of ^{d}NIN.HUR.SAG, also uses as a logographic writing of the name of Dagan's spouse.

Grégoire Nicolet proposes that the entry Ninkur in a variant of the Weidner god list known exclusively from Ugarit might represent the deity from Emar, as opposed to any lower Mesopotamian namesake. He suggests that Ugaritic scribes might have added her to the list due to her importance in the traditions of a nearby area.
