= Uttu =

Mesopotamian goddess

- Goddess of weaving
- Major cult center: Babylon, possibly Umma
- Animals: possibly spiders

Genealogy
- Spouse: Ninkurra

Uttu(𒋳𒌆 TAG.TUG₂) was a Mesopotamian goddess associated with weaving. It has been suggested that she was connected with spiders, though the evidence is limited to a single text which might reflect scribal speculation. She was worshiped in Babylon and possibly in Early Dynastic Umma. She appears in multiple myths, such as Enki and Ninhursag and Enki and the World Order.

== Name and character ==
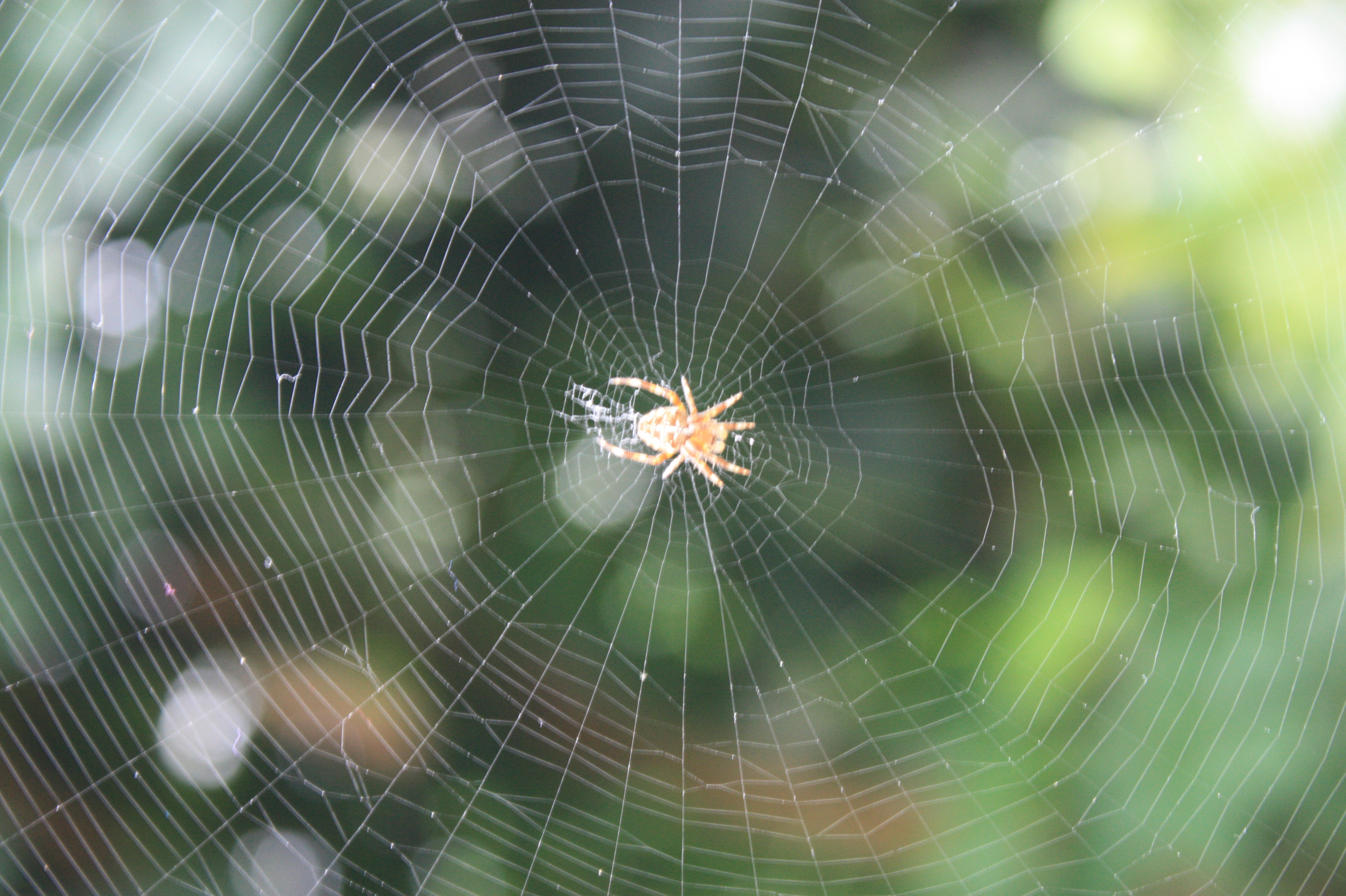
It has been argued that Uttu was envisioned as a spider spinning a web, but the evidence in favor of this view is limited.

Uttu's name was written TAG×TÙG, with the sign TAG (usually pronounced as tuku) referring to the action of weaving cloth. The word uttu could also denote a part of a loom. It is also possible that the name ^{d}TAG.NUN should be read as Uttu, though Joan Goodnick Westenholz rejected this interpretation and instead assumed that ^{d}TAG.NUN was one of the multiple writings of the name of Bizilla or a closely related goddess who like her came to be associated with Nanaya in later sources.

Uttu was regarded as the goddess of weaving. According to an esoteric explanatory text which links various materials with gods, she could be associated with colored wool.

=== Uttu and spiders ===
Thorkild Jacobsen argued that Uttu was envisioned as a spider spinning a web. However, the connection between Uttu and spiders, or more precisely between her name and the Akkadian word ettūtu ("spider"), is limited to a single text, and it might represent a "learned etymology" (scribal speculation), a folk etymology or simply rely on the terms being nearly homophonous. Two copies of the text contain slightly different versions of the same passage, "the handiwork of a spider (ettūtu) will be steady in his house," or "the handiwork of Uttu will be steady in his house." Ettūtu was only one of the words for spiders present in Akkadian texts, the other two being anzūzu (written ŠÈ.GUR_{4}) and possibly lummû. In Sumerian, spiders were known as aš, aš_{5}, lùm or si_{14}. In Mesopotamian literature spiders are mostly attested in proverbs, with a particularly well attested one describing a spider (ŠÈ.GUR_{4}) putting a ḫamitu insect in fetters and then cutting it into pieces after it acted as a witness in a lawsuit against a kuzāzu insect. Most likely the meaning of it was that an evildoer should not act as a witness. Another proverb mentions a spider (ettūtu) which prepared a net to catch a fly but ended up threatened itself by a lizard, possibly meaning that one responsible for evil deeds will be eventually defeated by a greater force. Spiders also occur as an art motif on Early Dynastic seals associated with female weavers.

== Worship ==
Uttu was worshiped in the E-ešgar, "house of work assignment," which was a part of the Esagil temple complex in Babylon.

^{d}TAG.NUN, who might be the same deity as Uttu, had a temple in Umma in the Early Dynastic period, built by king Il. ^{d}TAG.NUN is also attested in a theophoric name, Ur-^{d}TAG.NUN.

Two bilingual Sumero-Akkadian incantations known from the neo-Assyrian period mention Uttu. In both cases, she is described cooperating with Inanna on spinning yarn.

== Mythology ==
According to the myth Enki and Ninhursag, Uttu's parents were Enki and Ninkurra. In a late tradition, Ninkurra was instead a male deity and Uttu's husband. A variant of Enki and Ninhursag makes Ninkurra Uttu's grandmother and Ninimma her mother. Enki is also addressed as Uttu's father in a Neo-Assyrian incantation. However, another late text documents a tradition in which her father was Anu. In the late god list An = Anu ša amēli, Uttu is equated with Enki, which reflects a theological phenomenon of reinterpreting originally distinct deities responsible for specific professions as aspects of him even if they were originally viewed as female.

In Enki and Ninhursag, Uttu is the final goddess Enki (aided by his sukkal Isimud) tries to seduce while engaging in a series of incestuous encounters with his descendants (Ninšar, Ninkurra, in a variant of the text Ninimma, and finally Uttu). Unlike the other goddesses, Uttu receives advice from Ninhursag, and probably attempts to trick Enki with a false promise of marriage under the condition that he will supply her with fresh produce. While she is initially successful, Enki manages to obtain the requested cucumbers, apples and grapes from a farmer. He approaches her for a second time disguised as a gardener and this time Uttu becomes pregnant. Ninhursag intervenes and manages to remove Enki's seed from Uttu's body, which breaks the cycle of incestuous relationships. The scene is more detailed than the previous encounters between Enki and his daughters in the same myth. The narrative makes no reference to Uttu's association with weaving.

Uttu also appears in the myth Enki and the World Order, where she is the last of the deities awaiting the assignment of a domain. She is called a "conscientious woman" and "the silent one". It has been pointed out that both in Enki and Ninhursag and in Enki and the World Order, Uttu's appearance marks a shift in the narrative: after her encounter with Enki in the former myth, the cycle of Enki's attempts at seducing and taking advantage of the goddesses ends, while in the latter, after her destiny is declared, Inanna and her complaints about not receiving an appropriate share of the universe take the center stage.

A reference to Uttu is also known from the debate poem The Debate between Grain and Sheep, which describes a distant time before she started to weave, symbolically representing the age before the advent of civilisation and technology.
