= Ennugi =

Mesopotamian god

- Agricultural god
- Member of the court of Enlil
- Major cult center: Nippur

Genealogy
- Spouse: Nanibgal

Ennugi (𒀭𒂗𒉡𒄄) was a Mesopotamian god associated with agriculture, especially irrigation, and with the underworld. According to an incantation he was also considered to be the creator of grubs. He was a member of the court of Enlil, and appears in god lists alongside its other members, such as Ninimma and Kusu. He was worshiped in Nippur, where his temple Erabriri was most likely located. He is also mentioned in a number of myths, including Atra-Hasis and the Epic of Gilgamesh.

== Name and character ==
Manfred Krebernik and Jan Lisman suggest that Ennugi's name is a shortened form of the theonym Enlunugid, possibly "the lord who lets nobody return", known from the Early Dynastic Zame Hymns, as well as the Fara and Abu Salabikh god lists. Benjamin Foster argues that he was an underworld deity. A late explanatory list (CT 25, 49) explains his name as "lord of the netherworld, lord of no return" (bēl erṣetim bēl lā târi). However, despite the similarity of the names he most likely was not the same deity as Ennugigi, who is attested in a number of sources, including the myth Nergal and Ereshkigal, as one of the gatekeepers of the underworld.

Ennugi was also associated with irrigation, though he was not the only Mesopotamian god responsible for it. His epithets highlight his agricultural character. He could be called the "lord of dike and ditch" or the "lord of the field and ploughmen". He is also mentioned in the text Lipit-Ishtar and the Plow as one of multiple deities partaking in fieldworks, the other ones being Ninurta, Lisin, Suen, Nuska and Ninamaškuga.

An incantation states that Ennugi was the creator of grubs. Other mythical figures who could be credited with the creation of various similar living beings were Ninkilim and Alulu, a primordial king of Eridu.

== Associations with other deities ==
Ennugi belonged to the court of Enlil. He functioned as the guzalû of this god. This term is variously translated as "throne-bearer," "chamberlain" or "herald." According to Manfred Krebernik, it might have been a position associated with judicial power. In a single text, he is also called Enlil's son. Andrew R. George notes that both in the god list An = Anum and in the Canonical Temple List, Ennugi appears alongside other courtiers of Enlil, after Ninimma and before Kusu, Ninšar, Ninkasi and Ninmada. In one case he is also identified with one of the sons of Enmesharra, presumably based on an unidentified shared aspect of their respective characters.

The goddess Nanibgal was regarded as Ennugi's wife. This theonym was often treated as an epithet or alternate name of Nisaba. However, at some point it came to designate a separate deity. In most god lists Nanibgal appears separately from Nisaba, which indicates they were understood as two separate deities, but there is presently no evidence that she was worshiped independently from the latter. She and Ennugi also appear separately from Nisaba and Haya in an incantation. Only a single example of a theophoric name invoking her, Ur-Nanibgal (an ensi of Nippur), is known. According to An = Anum, Nanibgal fulfilled the same role in Ninlil's court as Ennugi did in Enlil's.

In the incantation series Šurpu, Ennugi appears alongside Mandanu, a god regarded as the guzalû of Marduk.

The god Gā'u could be referred to as the shepherd of Ennugi, though he also appears in association with Suen. Richard L. Litke tentatively proposed that this might indicate the existence of a tradition in which his two masters were identified with each other on this basis. However, according to other authors this should be considered a "mere curiosity." Wilfred G. Lambert went as far as suggesting the reading "shepherd of Ennugi" might be erroneous.

Jeremy Black and Anthony Green proposed that Ennugi might have been considered analogous to Gugalanna, the husband of Ereshkigal, because the latter's name can be translated as "canal inspector of An". However, the use of the similar epithet gugallu to refer to Ennugi might be a scribal error. It is possible that in reality the term gallȗ is meant, in this context to be understood as a designation of an officer of the divine assembly.

== Worship ==
It was formerly believed that Ennugi first appears in an offering list from the Ur III period, but according to Manfred Krebernik and Jan Lisman he was already worshiped in the Early Dynastic period under a longer form of his name, Enlunugid. In the Zame Hymns, this deity appears in association with Umma. Marcos Such-Gutiérrez additionally notes a single theophoric name invoking Ennugi, Ur-Ennugi, is already present in a text from Adab from the Old Akkadian period.

Shulgi built a temple dedicated to Ennugi in Nippur, according to Douglas Frayne possibly to be identified with the Erabriri known from later sources, such as the Canonical Temple List. Andrew R. George notes that this ceremonial name can be translated as "house of the shackle which holds in check," and also concludes that it was likely located in Nippur. The temple of Mandanu in Babylon bore the same name, possibly due to him fulfilling an analogous position in the court of Marduk as Ennugi did in Enlil's. Another temple dedicated to him was the Erabšaša, "house which snaps the shackle," whose location is unknown. He is also attested in a brick inscription from Ur.

== Mythology ==
Ennugi is briefly mentioned in Atra-Hasis. He also appears in the standard edition of the Epic of Gilgamesh as one of the gods who take on oath while they decide to cause the great flood.

In the incantation series Šurpu, Ennugi is implored to bind Asakku, which according to Wilfred G. Lambert reflects a tradition where he, rather than Ninurta, was responsible for vanquishing this demon.

A hymn to Nuska states that he was responsible for issuing orders to Ennugi.
