= Ninimma =

Mesopotamian goddess

- Divine scribe, scholar or librarian
- Member of the court of Enlil
- Major cult center: Nippur

Genealogy
- Parents: Enki, Enlil or Enmesharra (father); Ninkurra (mother)
- Spouse: Kusibanda or Ninurta
- Children: Uttu (in a variant of the myth Enki and Ninmah)

Ninimma was a Mesopotamian goddess best known as a courtier of Enlil. She is well attested as a deity associated with scribal arts, and is variously described as a divine scholar, scribe or librarian by modern Assyriologists. She could also serve as an assistant of the birth goddess Ninmah, and a hymn describes her partaking in cutting of umbilical cords and determination of fates. It has also been suggested that she was associated with vegetation. In the Middle Babylonian period she additionally came to be viewed as a healing deity.

Nippur was Ninimma's main cult center, though she is also known from documents from other cities, such as Adab and Uruk. In various sources, she appears alongside deities such as Nisaba, who like her was associated with scribes, or other members of Enlil's court, such as Shuzianna and Ninkasi. She is sparsely attested in literary texts, with only two hymns dedicated to her presently known. She also appears in the myth Enki and Ninmah and in a variant of Enki and Ninhursag.

== Character ==
Ninimma's history has been characterized as long and complex. The meaning of the second element of her name, written in cuneiform as SIG_{7} (correct reading is confirmed by phonetic spellings in lexical lists and other sources) remains unknown, with past proposals including "green growth," "brick," or a pun on a term referring to the vulva. A further possibility is that the name was understood as ^{d}nin-im-ak, "lady of clay" or "lady of the clay tablet". Her role as a goddess associated with scribal arts is well attested. According to Julia Krul this was the oldest aspect of her character. Christopher Metcalf characterizes her as a goddess associated with wisdom and writing who was "appealing to the mind of an ancient scholar of Sumerian literature." She has been variously described as fulfilling the role of a divine scholar, scribe or librarian by modern authors.

A further role attested for Ninimma is that of a goddess of birth. In an Old Babylonian hymn, she is described as a helper of Aruru who partakes in creation of life and assists her in cutting the umbilical cord and determining fates. Ninimma might have also been associated with vegetation. This aspect of her character might be tied to her role as a goddess of birth.

From the Middle Babylonian period onward, Ninimma could also be regarded as a healing goddess. A reference to this role can be found in the incantation series Šurpu, where she appears in a sequence of deities invoked to break a curse, after Lugal-Marada and Imzuanna, and before Shuzianna, Šulpae, Sadarnunna, Belet-ili, Sud, Siris and Ningishzida.

A possible reference to an association between Ninimma and a type of birds (KUR.GI^{mušen}; translation uncertain, possibly geese) has been identified by Karen Focke.

While the view that Ninimma was primarily a male deity is not considered credible today, sporadic references to male Ninimma are nonetheless known. One possible example is a god list where Ninimma is described as "Ea of the Scribes," ^{d}nin.ìmma = ^{d}é-a šá ^{lú}ṭupšarri.

== Associations with other deities ==
As of 1999, the only known text directly referring to Ninimma's parentage is a variant of the myth Enki and Ninhursag, according to which her parents were Enki and Ninkurra. A hymn published in 2019 also identifies this god as her father, though only indirectly, but her mother is left nameless. In Seleucid Uruk, Ninimma instead came to be viewed as one of the seven children of Enmesharra. This tradition most likely was not yet known in earlier periods, and relied on equating her with the deity Zisummu, well attested in this role. According to Karen Focke, in the god list An = Anum Ninimma is labeled as a sister of Ninurta, which would make her a daughter of Enlil, who is also called her father in a Neo-Assyrian incantation. However, based on the recently published hymn, which refers to her as Ninurta's wife, Christopher Metcalf has challenged this interpretation, pointing out that only a single manuscript of An = Anum refers to Ninimma as nin ^{d}nin-[urta]-ke_{4}, literally "lady of Ninurta," and this phrase might also be interpreted as referring to her status as his wife, rather than sister, as previously assumed. Joan Goodnick Westenholz in an earlier publication pointed out that Ninimma could be linked to Ninnibru, the title of Ninurta's wife, though she assumed this association reflected her role as Ninurta's sister, rather than spouse. Elsewhere, the god Kusibanda is described as Ninimma's husband. He was considered the deity of goldsmiths. In a variant of the myth Enki and Ninhursag, the eponymous god impregnates Ninimma, who subsequently gives birth to Uttu.

Ninimma was regarded as one of the members of the court of Enlil, specifically as a scribe in his service. She is already attested as a member of his circle in the Old Babylonian An = Anum forerunner. In An = Anum itself she is also said to be a nurse of his children, notably Suen. The same role could be attributed to Shuzianna as well. Julia M. Asher-Greve notes that direct references to goddesses breastfeeding, such as the designation of Ninimma as a nurse of Sin are rare in Mesopotamian literature. Outside An = Anum, Ninimma appears in association with the moon god only in a single Neo-Assyrian fragmentary god list where her entry follows his.

Ninimma could also be associated with Nisaba (for instance in god lists she often follows her and her spouse Haya) and possibly acquired some of her characteristics as a result. It has been argued that they fulfilled a similar role in the pantheon of Nippur. However, Andrew R. George argues that their character was not identical, and that Ninimma's main role can be compared to a modern librarian, while Nisaba functioned as a scribe and scholar. A single Old Babylonian letter invokes Nisaba and Ninimma together in a greeting formula in which the sender wishes the recipient to receive wisdom from these goddesses.

Various ritual texts indicate Ninimma was associated with Shuzianna, who also appears alongside her in the myth Enki and Ninmah among the eponymous goddess' helpers aiding her in creation of mankind. They both were also members of a group of deities from the court of Enlil which according to Wilfred G. Lambert is known from an offering list from the Ur III period and a later theological commentary, which also included Nuska, Ennugi, Kusu, Ninšar and Ninkasi. Ninimma additionally appears alongside these five deities and Ninmada in sections dedicated to Enlil's courtiers in An = Anum and the Canonical Temple List.

The name of Irda, a minor goddess from the pantheon of Nippur who was associated with the underworld, appears as a title of Ninimma in the Old Babylonian forerunner of An = Anum, but according to Karen Focke they are not associated with each other in any other texts, which likely indicates this is an ancient scribal error. In An = Anum itself, Irda appears after the section dedicated to Ninimma.

According to Frans Wiggermann Ninimma was sometimes confused with the obscure creator goddess Nammu, which might be why the latter was sporadically referred to as the "true housekeeper of Ekur". Wilfred G. Lambert instead considered it possible that Nammu and Ninimma were etymologically related, rather than merely confused with each other, and suggests that Ninimma was at some point in time functionally analogous to Nammu, and like her was regarded as a primordial creator deity.

== Worship ==
The oldest attestation of Ninimma is an entry in the Early Dynastic Fara god list. She was chiefly associated with the city of Nippur, where she was already worshiped prior to the rise of the Akkadian Empire in the third millennium BCE. She is well attested in offering lists from this city and Puzrish-Dagan from the Ur III period. However, only two such documents are known from later times, one from the Old Babylonian period and another from the reign of the Neo-Babylonian king Nebuchadnezzar II. A temple dedicated to her existed in Nippur. It bore the ceremonial Sumerian name Emekilibšudu, "house which perfects all the me". The Nippur Compendium indicates that it housed chapels dedicated to Enlil, Ninlil and Ninurta. Another temple of Ninimma known from lexical lists, Enamengarra, "house which establishes dominion", was also located in Nippur according to Karen Focke. Furthermore, she was worshiped in the temple of Gula in the same city. She was one of the deities who took part in a procession during a festival connected to this location known from sources from the Achaemenid period.

Theophoric names from Nippur from the Ur III and Old Babylonian periods, such as Ur-Ninimma and Ku-Ninimma, indicate that Ninimma enjoyed a certain level of popularity. A number of scribes bearing the latter name are known. In the sphere of personal religion, the worship of Ninimma continued in the Kassite period, as indicated by prayers and seal inscriptions. She also appears in Middle Babylonian theophoric names, such as Ninimma-kipišu or Ninimma-andul.

In addition to various attestations of Ninimma from Nippur, a temple dedicated to her is also mentioned in a text from Adab either from the Early Dynastic or Sargonic period. A text from the palace of Sennacherib in Nineveh indicates that a cultic seat dedicated to her, Nidana-geštu, "(house of) learning and understanding," existed in the library of the Ešarra temple in Assur. According to Andrew R. George, its existence might have been the result of patterning the cult of Ashur on that of Enlil. Another seat dedicated to her was located in the temple of Ningal in Ur.

An Early Dynastic statuette from Uruk might be inscribed with Ninimma's name, but the reading is not certain, and there is no other evidence in her early presence in this city. In a ritual text from the same city from the Seleucid period, she appears alongside deities such as the local goddess Uṣur-amāssu, Šilamkurra, elsewhere described as a daughter of Ninsun, and otherwise unknown Ninurbu. However, she is not attested in earlier Neo-Babylonian sources from this city, and does not appear in theophoric names or legal texts.

== Literature ==
Ninimma is sparsely attested in Mesopotamian literature. An Old Babylonian hymn focused on her role as a divine scribe until 2019 was the only known composition dedicated to her, though references to an unpublished lament from the Ur III period can also be found in Assyriological literature. Since then, only a single further hymn dedicated to her has been identified. In addition to describing Ninimma's usual roles, it also portrays her as an adviser to various deities, including Enki and Inanna, in this composition referred to with the epithet in-nin_{9}, "mistress" (typically used in texts highlighting her warlike character), rather than with the proper theonym. It also describes Ninimma as the wife of Ninurta, and implores her to mediate with him on behalf of a worshiper, identified in the closing lines king Nanni (also spelled Nanne), who is also known from the Tummal Chronicle, which counts him among the members of the Second Dynasty of Ur and attributes the creation of the garden of the Ekur, Enlil's temple in Nippur, to him. Christopher Metcalf assumes that he came to be viewed as a literary character in the Old Babylonian period, when the discussed text was composed. Jeremiah Peterson notes that no other cultic song circulated in this period mentions any historical or legendary rulers earlier than Gudea, and on this basis tentatively speculates that Nanni's presence in this text might be a form of cryptography based on the similarity of his name to the word nanni, "someone", meant to make the composition appropriate for any ruler. Both hymns dedicated to Ninimma are assumed to be scholarly compositions, and according to Metcalf they might be disconnected from active worship of this goddess, with their main purpose being to "glorify the scholarly author's own craft." However, Peterson does not agree with this assumption, and points out that Ninimma's presence in offering lists makes it plausible that hymns dedicated to her were in active circulation as part of her cult.

Ninimma also appears in the myth Enki and Ninmah, where she is one of the seven goddesses who help with the creation of mankind. The remaining six members of this group are Shuzianna, Ninmada, Ninšar, Ninmug, Mumudu and Ninnigina. They do not appear together elsewhere, and the criteria based on which the compilers of this text selected them are unknown. Collectively the helpers of Ninmah could be referred to as Šassūrātu. In god lists this group was treated as analogous to foreign goddesses of similar character, Hurrian Hutena and Hutellura and Ugaritic Kotharāt.

A further myth which mentions Ninimma is Enki and Ninhursag, according to which she was a daughter of Ninkurra and Enki and mother of Uttu. In the version from Nippur she is absent and Ninkurra gives birth to Uttu instead. It is not certain why these specific goddesses were selected for their respective roles.
