= Ninti =

Mesopotamian goddess

- Major cult center: Lagash

Genealogy
- Spouse: Enki
- Children: Ninkasi, Siris

Ninti (Sumerian: 𒀭𒎏𒋾; "mistress of life") was a Mesopotamian goddess worshipped in Lagash. She was regarded as the mother of Ninkasi. She also appears in the myth Enki and Ninhursag as one of the deities meant to soothe the Enki's pain. In this text, her name is reinterpreted first as "lady rib" and then as "lady of the month" through scribal word play.

== Attestations ==
Ninti's name can be translated as "mistress who keeps alive" or "mistress (of) life". A variant form of her name might be Nintiḫal, "mistress who allocates life". However, Jeremiah Peterson notes that due to the existence of the divergent variant spelling Kurratiḫal it is not certain how the cuneiform sign NIN should be read in this case.

Oldest attestations of Ninti have been identified in texts from Fara. She is also attested in Early Dynastic texts from Lagash, and according to Gebhard Selz must have been worshipped in this city, as references to a temple dedicated to her are known. This conclusion has been subsequently accepted by other authors. She also appears in the theophoric names Ninti-badmu, "Ninti is my mother", and Ninti-men, "Ninti is the crown" or "Ninti has the crown". Further attestations, including theophoric names (for example Ur-Ninti), as well as entries in offering lists and god lists, are available from the Ur III and Old Babylonian periods. In the Old Babylonian god list from Mari, Ninti appears in the proximity of Nindara and Ninmug.

== Associations with other deities ==
A hymn to Ninkasi states that while this goddess was raised by Ninhursag, her parents were Ninti and Enki. Ninti and Ninkasi occur near each other in a document from the Fara period. The relation between Ninti and Enki is also attested in the god-list An = Anum, where she is equated with his spouse Damkina. The masculine equivalent of her name, Enti, is also given as an alternate name of Enki, though in other contexts ^{d}EN.TI was instead a logographic representation of the name of Ebiḫ, a mountain god presumed to represent Hamrin Mountains. Ninti also occurs next to Enki in a lexical list referred to as Silbenvokabular A.

Antoine Cavigneaux and Manfred Krebernik additionally suggest that the deity Nintiḫal might correspond to Ninti in the Nippur god list, and that under this name she was understood as the mother of Siris. The list records the sequence Nintiḫal, Siris, Ninkasi. Nintiḫal is also attested in relation to Nungal, the goddess of prisons. She was regarded as the udug (in this context: "protective spirit") of her house.

Gebhard Selz stresses that Ninti should not be confused with Nintinugga, a healing-goddess from Nippur.

== Mythology ==
In the myth Enki and Ninhursag, Ninti appears as one of the eight deities created to relieve Enki of his pain, being specifically responsible for healing his ribs. The other deities created for the same purpose in this narrative include Abu, Ninsikila (Meskilak), Ningiriutud (Ningirida), Ninkasi, Nanshe, Azimua and Ensag (Inzak). In the end, when favorable destinies are proclaimed for all of them, Ninti is appointed to the position of the "lady of the month". Her name is reinterpreted first as a pun on nin-ti, "lady rib", and then nin-iti, "lady of the month", which according to Dina Katz reflects the fact that the compilers of the text selected her entirely based on her name's potential for wordplay and were "not interested in her religious background". Jeremiah Peterson considers the reinterpretation of her name to be an example of a folk etymology.
