= Shuzianna =

Mesopotamian goddess

- Dam-ban-da of Enlil
- Member of Šassūrātu
- Major cult center: Nippur

Equivalents
- Ugaritic: Dadmish

Shuzianna (Šuzianna; 𒀭𒋗𒍣𒀭𒈾 ^{d}Šu-zi-an-na) was a Mesopotamian goddess. She was chiefly worshiped in Nippur, where she was regarded as a secondary spouse of Enlil. She is also known from the enumerations of children of Enmesharra, while in the myth Enki and Ninmah she is one of the seven minor goddesses helping with the creation of mankind.

== Name ==
Shuzianna's name has Sumerian origin and means "the just hand of heaven." A late text offers an esoteric bilingual explanation, "AN-tum gāmilat (ŠU.GAR) napišti (ZI) ^{d}A-nim," "the goddess (alternatively: Antu) who saves the life of Anu." Another similar source explains it as "^{d}Be-let Babili, e-ti-rat," "Lady of Babylon, the savior," based on the similarity to Šu-an-na^{ki}, an uncommon alternate name of that city.

A neo-Assyrian theological text explains that she was a name of Gula. However, she and Gula were worshiped as two separate goddesses in Nippur.

== Position in the pantheon ==
The Weidner god list places her in the circle of Ninurta, right behind Lugal-Marada (the city god of Marad) and his wife Imzuanna. The trilingual Sumero-Hurrian-Ugaritic edition from Ugarit equates her with the local goddess Dadmish. She is absent from the Old Babylonian Isin and Nippur god lists, though in a list from the same period regarded as a predecessor of the later An = Anum she appears in the circle of Enlil, in the proximity of the deities Ninkasi, Sirash and Patindu, associated with ritual libations. An = Anum list itself identifies her as a "concubine" (dam-ban-da) of Enlil and nurse of Sin, though the same text also refers to Ninimma as the latter. The term referring to her relation with Enlil has also been translated as "second wife" or "younger wife."

In an incantation, she is called the concubine of Anu, rather than Enlil, which might be the result of confusion with Ninursala, who is called the dam-ban-da of Anu in the god list An = Anum.

In some ritual contexts she was associated with Ninimma. They also appear together in the myth Enki and Ninmah among the eponymous goddess' helpers aiding her in creation of mankind. The group consisted out of seven goddesses, the remaining five being Ninmada, Ninšar, Ninmug, Mumudu and Ninniginna. According to god lists, under their collective name Šassūrātu they were equated with groups of foreign goddesses of similar character, Hurrian Hutena and Hutellura and Ugaritic and Mariote Kotharāt.

She also appears in various lists of the seven children of Enmesharra. One text calls her the "daughter of Enmešarra, whom Enlil married."

== Worship ==
Shuzianna was worshiped chiefly in Nippur, where she had a temple. In the Ekur complex she was worshiped in the E-gagimah (Sumerian: "house, exalted harem"). She was also one of the fourteen deities worshiped in Eurusaga, the temple of Gula, alongside the likes of Urmah, Ninimma, Belet-Seri, Sirash and Ningirzida. It is also possible that a joint temple dedicated to her and Enlil, E-kiaggashudu (Sumerian: "perfect beloved house") known from a theological text was located in Nippur. Additionally, while the E-kurigigal (Sumerian: "house, mountain endowed with sight") in Nippur was dedicated to Enlil and his primary wife Ninlil, one text indicates that it was also where rites connected to the marriage between him and Shuzianna were celebrated.

In addition to her main cult center, Shuzianna was also worshiped in Umma (in the Ur III period), as well as in Uruk (where she appears in a late ritual from the Hellenistic period in a context related to Enmesharra), Ur and possibly in a presently unknown location in Assyria. In Ur she was worshiped in E-eshbanda (Sumerian: "house, the little chamber") a sanctuary within the Ningal temple, built by Sin-balassu-iqbi.

One of the Temple Hymns is dedicated to Shuzianna.
