= Lumma =

Mesopotamian god

- Divine warrior and farmer
- Major cult center: Umma, Nippur
- Weapon: mace

Genealogy
- Parents: Ninmug (mother)

Lumma was a Mesopotamian god who could be portrayed as a warrior or as a farmer. It has been proposed that he was originally understood as the deified form of historical king Eannatum of Lagash, but this theory remains a matter of dispute among researchers. He could be paired with Ḫadaniš, and together they belonged to the group of deities associated with Enlil and the temple Ekur. The goddess Ninmug could be described as his mother. The worship of Lumma is best documented in Umma and Nippur. One of the kings of the former of these two cities bore the theophoric name Ur-Lumma.

== Name ==
The reading of the name ^{d}LUM-ma is not entirely certain, though Lumma (^{d}Lum-ma) is commonly used in modern Assyriological literature. In the past Ḫumma was believed to be a plausible reading. The uncertainty extends to theophoric names with the element ^{d}LUM-ma, resulting in spellings such as Ur-LUM-ma.

Origins in Sumerian, in a Semitic language or in a substrate have all been proposed for Lumma. Possible translations presuming the first of these options is correct include "magnificent", "lush" or "tall". While attempts have also been made to explain it as "cloud", Lumma shows no affinity with weather deities in any sources. Proponents of the second theory interpret his name as an imperative derived from the root *lmm, "to gather", or less plausibly as *lūn-ma, "he has come".

In names in which the element lumma appears to fulfill a theophoric function, but is not accompanied by the dingir sign, it might be understood as an epithet of another deity. In this case, it can be translated as "the lusty one", in a sense highlighting the strength of its bearer. According to Gebhard J. Selz the deity meant might be Dumuzi. However, his interpretation has been challenged by Gianni Marchesi, who argues most of his examples are misreadings. He instead suggests Ningirsu is a plausible interpretation.

== Character ==
Lumma was regarded as a warrior deity, and his attribute was a mace. He could also be described as a farmer. Gianni Marchesi notes that the combination of these two roles might suggest he was a deity similar to Ninurta or Ningirsu, though his position in the Mesopotamian pantheon was less prominent. A close affinity between the character of Lumma and Ningirsu has also been pointed out by Daniel Schwemer.

Lumma could be invoked against harmful supernatural beings. An incantation refers to him as a gallu (in this context, a supernatural "gendarme"), and implores Dumuzi to hand over a malicious demon troubling the petitioner to him. Marchesi argues that he can be considered the "gendarme-demon par excellence."

Bendt Alster suggested that Lumma might have been the personification of good luck. He was believed to bestow it upon people of good reputation. This aspect of his character is known from a proverb.

=== Lumma as a deified king ===
Thorkild Jacobsen suggested that Lumma represented the deification of a historical king, Eannatum of Lagash. The name Lumma is described in primary sources as Eannatum's "Tidnean name", Tidneans being a group of Amorites. It has been suggested that the second name might indicate that his mother or grandmother was an Amorite woman, though this theory is not plausible in the light of direct references to his family hailing from Gursar, a small settlement in the state of Lagash. A further possibility is that he received it from Tidnean mercenaries serving in his army, but it is not universally accepted either. Gebhard J. Selz's proposal that Lumma is to be interpreted as a title of Dumuzi in this context and that it refers to the king serving as a symbolic representation of this god is implausible according to Gianni Marchesi. Yet another possibility is that Eannatum was only a regnal name, while Lumma the given name of the same king, but the evidence is not conclusive.

Jacobsen pointed out that Lumma was associated with Ḫadaniš, who according to the Sumerian King List was a king of Ḫamazi, and on this basis concluded both of them were kings who at some point controlled Nippur, placed their statues in Ekur, and eventually came to be worshiped as deities associated with this temple. Other possible examples of minor deities who originated as deified legendary or historical rulers include Enlilazi, the "superintendent of Ekur", Ur-Suena, the herald of this temple's outer shrine, Ur-Zababa, the counsellor of Ninurta, Malaka, and others. Itūr-Mēr and Yakrub-El worshiped in Mari have also been classified as such.

The proposal that the god Lumma is deified Eannatum has been accepted by Assyriologists such as Wilfred G. Lambert, Richard L. Litke, Ichiro Nakata, Samuel Noah Kramer, and a number of other researchers, but it did not find universal support and remains a matter of controversy. Josef Bauer due to the broad distribution of theophoric names invoking Lumma argues that it is outright impossible for him to be a deified king of Lagash. The possibility that there were two deities named Lumma, a deified king and an unrelated independent figure, has also been considered. It is also possible that even if he did develop as a deified ruler, he was not identical with Eannatum, but rather with another bearer of the name Lumma, which was common in the third millennium. Another candidate is an ensi named Lumma mentioned in texts from Adab and Shuruppak.

== Associations with other deities ==
Lumma was frequently associated with Ḫadaniš, and both of them could be described as udug E_{2}-kur-ra, "guardians of Ekur". As such, they belonged to the circle of deities connected with Enlil. A single esoteric scholarly texts equates Lumma with Nuska and Ḫadaniš with Sadarnunna, Nuska's spouse. However, elsewhere Nuska and Lumma occur as separate deities.

A lamentation refers to Lumma as a servant of a deity whose name is not preserved, who might be either Dumuzi, another similar dying god such as Ningishzida or Lulil, or alternatively Ningublaga. This connection reflects his relatively low rank in the Mesopotamian pantheon.

The goddess Ninmug could be addressed as Lumma's mother. While a standard list of deities of laments in some known examples places him next to Ereš'ugga ("queen of the dead", the wife of Lugala'abba), this is most likely a mistake based on confusion between her and Ninmug resulting from the similar pronunciation of the Emesal forms of their names. Whether the connection between Lumma and Ninmug was based on the latter being involved in the investiture of kings and the former possibly being a deified ruler is not certain.

== Worship ==
Most attestations of the worship of Lumma come from the Early Dynastic period and from the reign of the Third Dynasty of Ur. It is presumed that he was venerated in Nippur and Umma. In sources from the former city, he appears in a number of theophoric names. Many are also known from the latter, including that of the local ruler Ur-Lumma. He used the title lugal in his own inscription, but texts from Lagash call him an ensi. Another Ur-Lumma was an official during the reign of Lugalzagesi. Lumma is also attested in an offering list from Umma from the Ur III period.

Due to Lumma's connection to Ninmug it has been suggested that at some point he might have belonged to the local pantheon of Kisiga, a city which according to the Early Dynastic Zame Hymns was her cult center.

In Adab, Lumma is attested in various theophoric names from the third millennium BCE, such as Lu-Lumma, Ur-Lumma and Lumma-zi. Further examples are also available from Shuruppak and Ur. Lumma is also attested in the names of various fields and canals. One example is Lummagimdu, "good like Lumma".
