= Šassūrātu =

Mesopotamian goddesses, helpers of Ninmah

- Assistants of Ninmah

Equivalents
- Ugaritic: Kotharat
- Hurrian: Hutena and Hutellura

Šassūrātu were a group of Mesopotamian goddesses regarded as the assistants of Ninmah. Their name can be translated as "midwives" and they were considered to be tutelary goddesses of pregnant women. They appear in the myth Enki and Ninmah, where they receive individual names, as well as in a late version of Atrahasis.

== Name and character ==
The name of the Šassūrātu is an Akkadian derivative of the Sumerian word šassūru, which can be translated as "womb" or "midwife." It is grammatically plural. As a theonym, it referred to a group of seven goddesses who functioned as the tutelary deities of pregnant women and birth. As such, they were regarded as helpers of the goddess Ninmah. Most likely they were believed to assist her during the birth of every human child. Manfred Krebernik characterizes them as "mother goddesses," a term commonly employed to refer to deities who took part in creation of mankind and of other gods. However, as noted by Julia M. Asher-Greve, the term "birth goddess" might be preferable in Assyriology. Joan Goodnick Westenholz also objected to the use of the phrase "mother goddess" in most cases, as deities subsumed under this term were typically not described as responsible for nurturing children. The term "birth goddess" is also favored by Alfonso Archi, who notes that the idea of a divine "Great Mother" which was originally formed by Johann Jakob Bachofen "enjoyed great success but (...) finds no justification in the documentation."

In texts from Ugarit, Šassūrātu correspond to local Kotharat and Hurrian Hutena and Hutellura, groups of goddesses of similar character. The equivalence between the first two groups is also known from texts from Mari, where they appear side by side in offering lists. It is possible that both Šassūrātu and Kotharat served as models for Hutena and Hutellura.

=== Šassūrātu as a single deity ===
The term Šassūrātu is in some cases used to refer to a single deity. It could be treated as an alternate name of Nintur, "mistress birth-hut," who was initially a fully distinct goddess, as attested in the Kesh temple hymn. However, Lluís Feliu notes the term is never directly equated with the name Ninmah, and therefore it cannot be assumed that the logogram ^{d}NIN.MAH was ever used interchangeably with the name Šassūrātu, for example in Ugarit, where both appear in syllabic versions of offering lists and most likely represent different Ugaritic deities.

The goddess Šasurra (^{d}Šà-sur-ra), whose name is etymologically related and who is treated alongside the Šassūrātu in reference works such as Reallexikon der Assyriologie und Vorderasiatischen Archäologie, was associated with the city of Urrak (^{uru}Ur-rak^{ki}). She is attested in a text known as the "Archive of Mystic Heptads," where she appears in an enumeration of birth goddesses from various cities, alongside Aruru, Nintur, Ninmah, Ninhursag, Ninmena and Erua (a manifestation of Zarpanit). The purpose of this list was most like to claim the position of the other goddesses for Zarpanit, who is subsequently described as the "mistress" of the entire heptad.

== Mythology ==
Šassūrātu appear as assistants of Ninmah in the myth Enki and Ninmah. In this text, their names are given as Ninimma, Šuzianna, Ninmada, Ninšar, Ninmug, Mumudu and Ninnigina. Wilfred G. Lambert established that these seven goddesses do not occur as a group anywhere else, and that at least six of them are attested in other sources. Ninimma was a goddess associated with writing, regarded as similar to Nisaba. Šuzianna was associated with midwifery also in other texts and she appears alongside Ninimma in other contexts. Ninmada, when treated as a goddess, was a divine snake charmer. Seemingly two deities, one male and one female, shared this name, though it is possible that they had similar origin or that they were at least partially conflated. Ninšar was a divine butcher and housekeeper. Ninmug was associated with artisanship, especially metalworking; she was also invoked during the preparation for divine statues. Her role as a birth goddess was most likely directly linked to her other functions, as the same Sumerian terms were used to refer to the fashioning of statues and to the birth of children. Mumudu according to Lambert most likely should be considered a form of Mamu, the goddess of dreams who was a daughter of the sun god Shamash. Ninnigina is otherwise unknown.

A late, Neo-Assyrian version of Atrahasis also mentions the Šassūrātu, though in this case two groups numbering seven unnamed goddesses each appear, one tasked with creating men and the other - women. Marten Stol presumes a connection existed between this group and the "fourteen (variant: sixteen) children of Dingirmah" known from god lists, though he notes there is no clear indication that all of them were goddesses.
