= Bappir =

Sumerian dish of twice-baked barley bread

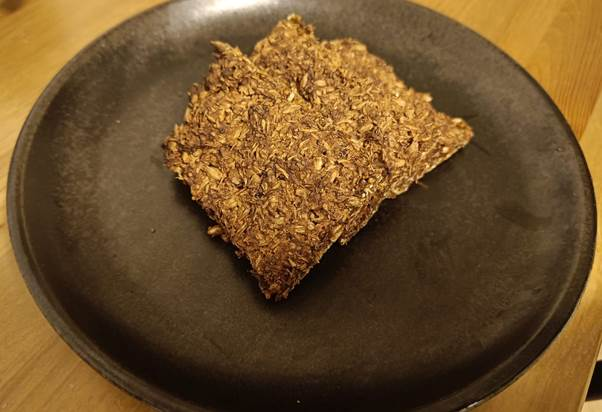
- Type: Bread
- Place of origin: Ancient Mesopotamia
- Main ingredients: Malted barley, barley flour, honey, water
- Other information: Used for brewing beer

Bappir was a Sumerian twice-baked barley bread that was primarily used in ancient Mesopotamian beer brewing. Historical research done at Anchor Brewing Co. in 1989 (documented in Charlie Papazian's Home Brewer's Companion (ISBN 0-380-77287-6)) reconstructed a bread made from malted barley and barley flour with honey, spices and water and baked until hard enough to store for long periods of time; the finished product was probably crumbled and mixed with water, malt and either dates or honey and allowed to ferment for a few days, producing a somewhat sweet brew. It seems to have been drunk flat without bottling or conditioning with a straw in the manner that yerba mate is drunk now.

It is thought that bappir was seldom baked with the intent of being eaten; its storage qualities made it a good candidate for an emergency ration in times of scarcity, but its primary use seems to have been beer-making.

A modern interpretation of Sumerian bappir bread was brewed and bottled in 2016 by Anchorbrew.

== See also ==
- Ninkasi, the Sumerian goddess of beer
- Biscotti, a similarly twice-baked modern bread that is often eaten as a sweet course with wine or coffee
