= Dadmiš =

Hurrian and Ugaritic goddess

- Goddess of healing
- Major cult center: Ugarit

Equivalents
- Mesopotamian: Shuzianna

Dadmiš (Ugaritic: 𐎄𐎄𐎎𐎌, ddmš) or Tadmiš (^{d}ta-ad-mi-iš) was a goddess worshipped in Ugarit. She is attested in texts written both in Ugaritic and in Hurrian. Her origin and functions remain unknown.

== Identification ==
The earliest researchers did not yet recognize Dadmiš as a separate deity, and her name was considered to be an epithet of Resheph, ršp ddm. Due to the trend in early scholarship to look for Greek explanations for terms present in Ugaritic texts it was assumed that this alleged deity was analogous to Apollo Didymaeus, similar to how the name Niqmaddu (nqmd, "Hadad the avenger") was misinterpreted as Nikomedes and the toponym Yman, referring to an area near the kingdom of Amurru known also from Assyrian and Hebrew sources, as Ionia. The correct reading of the name, Dadmiš, was first proposed as early as 1932 by Bedřich Hrozný (who was also responsible for identifying the names of many Hurrian deities, for example Nupatik and Kumarbi, in Ugaritic texts), and eventually became the consensus.

The later discovery of a trilingual version of the Weidner god list with Sumerian, Hurrian and Ugaritic columns made it possible to establish not only that Dadmiš was not an epithet, but a separate deity, but also that she was female, unlike Resheph. Sporadic references to Dadmiš as a male deity can nonetheless be found in later literature, for example Volkert Haas referred to her as "der (...) Gott Dadmiš" in a brief description of the religion of Ugarit, while Aaron Tugendhaft labels her as "the Hurrian god Tatmiš".

The spelling of Dadmiš' name differs between the alphabetic texts (ddmš) and the standard syllabic cuneiform ones (^{d}ta-ad-mi-iš), and as a result two romanized forms of the name are used in modern publications, Dadmiš and Tadmiš. Michael C. Astour argued that the syllabic spelling reflected Hurrian phonetics.

== Origin ==
The origin of Dadmiš is uncertain. Emmanuel Laroche in an early study assumed that Dadmiš was a Syrian goddess in origin. The derivation of her name from the Akkadian word dadmū, "dwellings," has been tentatively proposed by Jean Nougayrol, and was subsequently accepted by Michael C. Astour, who suggested that she was originally the city goddess of Dadmuš, a settlement located in the "Transtigridian" area with an etymologically related name. However, Marco Bonechi points out that in Ugarit the cognate term dadmum most likely was used in the sense known from letters from Mari, where it appears to function as an Amorite name of the kingdom of Aleppo. He points out that Ugaritic texts also contain the term ddm, which might refer to inhabitants of the countryside surrounding ancient Aleppo ("Dadmians"), and to the "gods of da-ad-me-ma," who have been tentatively linked with Dadmiš in past scholarship. Dennis Pardee accepts interpreting this term as "the gods of the land of Aleppo," but considers the origin of Dadmiš to be unknown.

Manfred Krebernik proposes that a connection exists between the name of Dadmiš and that of Tadmuštum, a Mesopotamian goddess associated with the underworld. The name of the latter might be derived from Akkadian dāmasu ("to humble") or dāmašu (related to the word "hidden"). A similarity between her name and Geʽez damasu ("to abolish," "to destroy" or "to hide") has been noted as well.

Wilfred G. E. Watson counts Dadmiš among goddesses worshiped in Ugarit who according to him had Hurrian or Anatolian origin. Gabriele Theuer also considers her to be a deity of Hurrian origin. However, Dennis Pardee considers this implausible on linguistic grounds.

== Character ==
The character of Dadmiš is unknown. Dennis Pardee considers her to be a goddess of healing. His assumption relies on the equation between her and the Mesopotamian goddess Šuzianna, attested in the trilingual edition of the Weidner god list from Ugarit. Šuzianna was recognized as a healing goddess, and as such could be described as a Gula-like figure. It has also been pointed out that Išḫara, who could be referred to with the epithet belet da-ad-me, "lady of the dwellings," which might be etymologically related to the name of Dadmiš, could be regarded as a divine healer as well. Aaron Tugendhaft assumes that Dadmiš is additionally equated with Zababa in another line of the same document.

On the basis of her possible relation to Tadmuštum, Manfred Krebernik proposes that Dadmiš was an underworld deity. He also suggests she was associated with Resheph and might have been regarded as his wife in Ugaritic tradition. According to Nicolas Wyatt, both of them belonged to the group referred to as "the gods who help Baal" (Ugaritic: il t‘ḏr b‘l). However, Dennis Pardee does not consider either of them to be closely associated with Baal.

== Attestations in the Ugaritic texts ==
In four Ugaritic god lists, Dadmiš appears between Resheph and the "assembly of the gods". In another similar document, she is present between two different deities whose names are not fully preserved. She also belonged to the Hurrian pantheon of the city. In a Hurrian ritual text, she follows Teššub, Kušuḫ and Ea and precedes Šauška.

While best attested in the god lists, Dadmiš is also present in other types of religious texts. In an offering list, she occurs after Yarikh, Anat of Saphon and Pidray, who all receive the same animal, a ram, as a sacrifice (Anat also receives a bull). In another, she follows Resheph; both of them are listed as recipients of sacrificial rams.

Despite the aforementioned evidence for the worship of Dadmiš, she is absent from known Ugaritic myths.
