= Kusu (goddess) =

Mesopotamian goddess

- Goddess of purification
- Member of the court of Enlil
- Major cult center: Nippur
- Animals: duck
- Symbol: censer

Genealogy
- Spouse: Indagara
- Offspring: Šudkuga

Kusu was a Mesopotamian goddess associated with purification and with grain. It is not certain which aspect of her character was originally primary, and which developed secondarily. She was considered to be a member of the court of Enlil, and in a number of text appears with other deities connected to him, such as Nuska. She could also be associated with other deities responsible for exorcisms, such as Ningirima. Multiple sanctuaries dedicated to her existed in Nippur, though she was also worshiped in other cities, for example Lagash and Assur. In the Seleucid period, she was additionally introduced to the local pantheon of Uruk.

== Character ==
Kusu was a goddess associated with purification. She was a deification of a type of ritual censer, nignakku, or at least was believed to use this tool herself. Other implements she was associated with include the gizzilû (torch) and the egubbû (a type of vessel). She was also associated with grain. It has been suggested that her name might mean "ripe cereal" or "bundle of ears of corn." Whether she was initially a grain goddess or a purification goddess and which of the aspects developed secondarily remains a matter of dispute among researchers.

The so-called Bird Call Text states that the duck was regarded as the bird of Kusu.

According to Julia Krul, a male aspect of Kusu is also attested. However, according to Frank Simons references to this version of this deity are infrequent. It has been suggested male Kusu is only attested in sources from the first millennium BCE.

=== Ezina-Kusu ===
The compound theonym Ezina-Kusu might rely on the proposed relation between Kusu's name and terms referring to grain, as the second part is a name of a grain goddess, Ezina. Frank Simons goes as far as suggesting Kusu was initially an epithet of Ezina which eventually became a separate goddess. The double name appears to refer to a deity analogous to Ezina in sources such as one of the inscriptions on the Gudea cylinders and The Debate between Grain and Ewe. At the same time, as noted by Joan Goodnick Westenholz, Ezina and Kusu appear separately in offering lists from Lagash. They also continued to be worshiped separately from each other in later periods. Furthermore, they appear in distinct roles in incantations, with the former invoked in formulas related to purification and the latter in these pertaining to birth.

== Associations with other deities ==
Kusu was associated with Enlil. She was called his "chief exorcist." According to Wilfred G. Lambert, she belonged to a group of deities from his court who appear together in sources such as an offering list from the Ur III period, an incantation, and a late esoteric explanatory text. Its other members were Shuzianna, Nuska, Ninimma, Ennugi, Ninšar and Ninkasi. In a text from Seleucid Uruk, Kusu appears in association with Nuska and Isimud.

In the text The First Brick, an incantation most likely recited during temple renovations, Kusu, addressed as the "chief priest of the great gods," is listed as one of the deities created by Ea from clay.

Kusu's husband was the god Indagara. According to Jeremiah Peterson, it is not certain if his name, which might be a term referring to a "young breed bull," designates him as a "theriomorphic, hybrid, or anthropomorphic" figure. He is equated with Ishkur in the god list An = Anum, and with Ḫaya in an Old Babylonian hymn to the latter god. Said composition mentions him alongside Kusu and refers to both of them as the deities "without whom heaven would not be pure nor earth bright, continual providers of the great meals of An and Enlil in their grand dining-hall." According to An = Anum, Kusu also had a daughter, Šudkuga, who is otherwise only attested in the Mari god list.

Due to their shared role in exorcisms, Kusu was often associated with deities such as Ningirima and Girra. A Mîs-pî ritual from Nineveh mentions the "holy water vessel of Kusu and Ningirima." This ritual container is also mentioned in other late rites. In late periods, Kusu, Ningirima and Nisaba functioned as the primary purification deities.

== Worship ==
Kusu, whose name was written in this context as ^{d}ku_{3}-su_{3}-ga(-PA.SIKIL), is already attested in offering lists from Early Dynastic Lagash. She appears in theophoric names from this location as well. She is also mentioned in a number of ritual texts as one of the deities of the Eibgal, a temple of Inanna (worshiped under the name Ninibgal locally) in Umma. Kusu could also be invoked in šuillakku, a type of prayers written in Akkadian focused on individual entreaties of petitioners.

A temple of Kusu existed in Nippur. While a metrological text attesting its existence does not mention its name, according to Andrew R. George it might be the same temple as the Esaĝĝamaḫ, "house of the exalted purifier," mentioned in the Canonical Temple List. It has been suggested that it might have also been dedicated to Ezina at some point. However, George notes that its name appears to reflect Kusu's position in the court of Enlil. The Canonical Temple List also mentions a second temple of Kusu, the Ešuddegištuku, "house which hears prayers." In Nippur she was also worshiped in the bīt dalīli, "house of fame," though she shared this sanctuary with Nisaba, Ningal, Shamash and Bēl-āliya. Furthermore, she was one of the deities venerated in a temple of Gula located in this city.

Kusu was also worshiped in Assur, where she had a seat in the temple Ešarra, dedicated to the god Ashur. A socle dedicated to her which bore the ceremonial name Eankikuga, "house of pure heaven and underworld," is attested in an inscription of Sin-balassu-iqbi from a sanctuary of Ningal located in Ur. Its author was a governor of this city in the Neo-Assyrian period.

In an unpublished hymn dedicated to the city of Borsippa, the temple name Egissubiduga, "house whose shade is pleasant," appears in association with Kusu, though in other sources this name instead belongs to a temple of Sin located in Damru, a town close to Babylon which was the latter deity's local cult center.

While Kusu is not attested in Neo-Babylonian texts from Uruk, she came to be worshiped in this city in the Seleucid period. Her presence in the late version of the local pantheon most likely should be considered part of a broader phenomenon which was centered on introduction of deities connected to the professions of various craftsmen, kalû clergy, as well as āšipu. According to Julia Krul, she might have been worshiped in the Bīt Rēš, "head temple," a complex dedicated to Anu and Antu built in this period. It is possible she functioned as the divine guardian of one of its gates. A room designated as 79b during excavations might have been a cella dedicated to her. An even later reference to Kusu might occur in a text dated to the reign of Tiberius, though the restoration is not certain.
