= Ninmug =

Mesopotamian artisan goddess

- Goddess of artisanship and birth
- Member of Šassūrātu
- Major cult center: Kisiga, Adab
- Symbol: golden chisel, silver burin, obsidian knife

Genealogy
- Spouse: Ishum; Hendursaga (through syncretism with Ishum); possibly Lugala'abba
- Children: Lumma

Ninmug or Ninmuga was a Mesopotamian goddess. She was associated with artisanship. This role was reflected in her epithet tibira kalamma, "metalworker of the land" or "sculptor of the land". She could also be regarded as a goddess of birth and assistant of Ninmah, most likely because the fashioning of statues of deities and the birth of children could be described with the same terms in Sumerian texts. Her main cult centers were Kisiga, whose location remains uncertain, and Adab.

From the Old Babylonian period onward, the god Ishum (and by extension his counterpart Hendursaga) could be regarded as her husband. While no children are attributed to him, Ninmug herself is addressed as the mother of the minor god Lumma in some sources. She was also associated with the underworld goddess Ereš'ugga based on similar writing of their names. While most researchers assume they were separate, it has also been proposed they were the same deity, and by extension that Ninmug could also be viewed as the wife of the sea god Lugala'abba.

== Name and character ==
The theonym Ninmug was written in cuneiform as ^{d}NIN.MUG. The reading was established based on the phonetic Emesal form, ga-ša-an-mu-ga, and on the phonetic gloss in the lexical list Diri, ni-im-mu-ug. ^{d}NIN.ZADIM might have been a variant spelling, though it has also bean argued that it should be read as Ninzadim, a distinct deity associated exclusively with seal cutters. Thorkild Jacobsen interpreted the name Ninmug as "lady vulva", but it is now assumed that element mug, which is also attested in personal names such as Mugsi (known from Adab) refers to an unidentified cultic utensil or building.

Ninmug was associated with artisanship and with birth. Most likely both functions were interlinked, and Antoine Cavigneaux and Manfred Krebernik point out that the same terms could be used to refer to birth of children and fashioning of cult statues and statuettes. She was particularly closely connected with metalworkers. She was referred to with the Sumerian title tibira kalamma, "metalworker of the land". However, it has also been argued that the term tibira might have referred to a sculptor working with stone, ivory or wood, as opposed to a metalworker. If this assumption is correct, Ninmug's epithet would accordingly designate her as the "sculptor of the land" instead. She could be described as wielding a variety of tools related to her trade, such as a golden chisel, a silver burin and an obsidian knife. She was also associated with the investiture of kings, as attested in the myth Enki and the World Order.

It has been argued that in late periods Ninmug started to be viewed as a male deity. However, as noted by Cavigneaux and Krebernik, it is not certain if the male deity Nin-MUG, who could be equated with Ea and who is conventionally assumed to be a god of bowyers, can be necessarily interpreted as a male form of Ninmug, and it is possible that his name was instead read Ninzed or Ninzedim.

== Worship ==
Ninmug is already attested in the Early Dynastic god list from Fara (Shuruppak), in which she precedes Ninšar. There is evidence that she was actively worshiped in this city. One of the Zame Hymns from Abu Salabikh from the same period associates her with Kisiga (Kissik). However, no other references to Kisiga have been identified in any sources from the third millennium BCE. The precise location of this city is unknown, but it is agreed that it was located in southern Babylonia, possibly in the Sealand. Texts from the first millennium BCE indicate it was close to Ur, Larsa, Uruk, Kullaba, Eridu and Nemed-Laguda. Identification with Tell al-Lahm is sometimes proposed. Later references to Kisiga are known from Old Babylonian texts and from between 1000 BCE and 600 BCE. It is known that it also functioned as a cult center of Inanna and Dumuzi or of Lugal-irra and Meslamta-ea.

Another major cult center of Ninmug was Adab, where at least before the Sargonic period she had her own temple. The eleventh month in the local calendar was named after her, as was a nearby canal. A sanga priest and officials involved in the cult of this goddess are also attested in documents from this city. In offering lists she appears after Ishkur or Nisaba. Offerings to Ninmug are also mentioned in records from Umma, while in Lagash she had a sanga priest.

In the Ur III and Old Babylonian periods, Ninmug could appear alongside her husband Ishum in cylinder seal inscriptions. It has been argued she was a popular deity at the time. References to her in personal letters are infrequent, though she nonetheless occurs comparably often as Ninsun or Ninkarrak. Theophoric names invoking Ninmug are known, one example attested in sources from between Early Dynastic and Ur III times being Ur-Ninmug.

== Associations with other deities ==
Ninmug's husband was Ishum, first attested in this role in the Old Babylonian period. As in the case of other divine wives, such as Aya and Shala, Ninmug was invoked to intercede with her husband on behalf of worshipers. Her intercessory role is attested in an Old Babylonian letter, whose author addresses her because "Ishum will listen to what you say". Hendursaga could be regarded as the husband of Ninmug too, but this was a secondary development based on the equation between him and Ishum. (Note: It is possible that in the third millennium BCE, Hendursaga's wife was instead Dumuziabzu, the tutelary goddess of Kinunir (Kinirsha), a city in the state of Lagash, though in that period family relations between deities were often particularly fluid or uncertain.) While no references to Ishum having children are known, Ninmug could be addressed as the mother of the god Lumma. An Emesal text, possibly a lament for an unidentified dying god, mentions them both alongside goddesses such as Nintinugga, Ninisina, Ereš'ugga and Lisin. Lumma was regarded as a guardian (udug) of Ekur, Enlil's temple in Nippur, or as an underworld demon (gallû). Gianni Marchesi describes him as "gendarme demon par excellence". It is possible that he originally belonged to the pantheon of Kisiga.

Lumma could also be associated with Ereš'ugga, whose name means "queen of the dead." A second translation, proposed by Wilfred G. Lambert and based on variant spellings, is "mistress of the house of the dead." Due to similarity between the names, she was sometimes confused with Ninmug. Her name was written as NIN-ĝa'uga or NIN-ug-ga, with the NIN sign in this case read as either ereš or égi based on provided glosses. The god list An = Anum equates her with Ninkarrak. It is possible that the confusion between her and Ninmug is responsible for the equation between the latter and Meme in a double column edition of the Weidner god list. According to An = Anum, Meme was an alternate name of Ninkarrak. Ereš'ugga was the wife of Lugala'abba, ("lord of the sea"), a god associated with both the sea and the underworld who was worshiped in Nippur during the reign of Samsu-iluna. An = Anum keeps Ninmug and Ereš'ugga apart, with the former appearing alongside Ishum and the latter alongside Lugala'abba. However, Wilfred G. Lambert asserted that they should be considered two variant spellings of the name of a single deity, who could be viewed as the wife of both Ishum and Lugala'abba.

In texts pertaining to the fashioning of statues of deities, Ninmug could appear alongside other deities associated with craftsmanship, such as Kusigbanda, Ninagala, Ninduluma and Ninkurra.

An offering list from Umma from the Ur III period mentions a nameless sukkal (attendant deity) of Ninmug.

== Mythology ==
In the myth Enki and Ninmah, Ninmug is one of the seven helpers of the eponymous goddess, described as goddesses of birth. The other six members of this group are Ninimma, Shuzianna, Ninšar, Ninmada, Mumudu and Ninniginna. It is assumed that Ninmug's role in this myth might be the reason why a single eršemma text equates her with Ninhursag, Dingirmah and Lisin. Ninmah's helpers could be collectively called Šassūrātu. This term was derived from šassūru, "womb", a Sumerian loanword in Akkadian. In an Ugaritic trilingual version of the Weidner god list, they were equated with Hurrian Hutena and Hutellura and local Kotharat. The latter group is also known Mari, where they were known as Kûšarātum. Their name is derived from the Semitic root kšr, "to be skilled".

Ninmug also appears in the myth Enki and the World Order. When Inanna complains about not being assigned a domain, she mentions her alongside Aruru, Nanshe, Nisaba and Ninisina as goddesses who receives specific areas of influence from Enki. Ninmug's appointment is stated to be the office of tibir kalamma.
