= Ninšar =

Mesopotamian goddess

- Divine butcher
- Member of Šassūrātu
- Major cult centre: AB.NAGAR, Nippur

Genealogy
- Spouse: Erragal

Ninšar (Sumerian: 𒀭𒊩𒌆𒊬, ^{d}NIN.SAR; also read Nin-nisig) was a Mesopotamian goddess commonly associated with the preparation of meat. The reading of her name remains uncertain, and its possible etymology appears to be unrelated to her role in the Mesopotamian pantheon. She was chiefly worshiped in Nippur, though her original cult center was the settlement AB.NAGAR.

== Name ==
The reading of the theonym written in cuneiform as NIN.SAR remains uncertain. Wilfred G. Lambert considered Ninšar to be the correct reading. This option is also accepted by Andrew R. George. Antoine Cavigneaux and Manfred Krebernik instead argue that the correct reading might be Nin-nisig. Ninmu and Ninezenna have also been proposed as alternatives. According to the god list An = Anum, the name could also be represented by the logograms ^{d}MUḪALDIM ("cook") or ^{d}GÍRI ("knife"). A syllabic spelling, nin-nì-si, might be present in a god list from Mari, but both the restoration of the final sign and the identification of this deity with Ninšar remain uncertain.

The name NIN.SAR is usually translated as "Lady Greenery" or "Lady Greens". One hymn to Nuska might contain a play on the name and the word SI_{12}, referring to the color green. Antoine Cavigneaux and Manfred Krebernik note that the name's meaning shows no direct connection with her well attested functions.

Ninšar should not be confused with homophonous ^{d}nin-šár ("Lady of All"), who appears alongside the matching male deity Enšar (^{d}en-šár) in enumerations of ancestors of Enlil in sources such as the god list An = Anum and the incantation series Šurpu.

== Character ==
Ninšar was associated with meat, and was often described as the "butcher of Ekur," as already attested in texts from the reign of Shulgi. An even earlier text from Lagash from the reign of Urukagina calls her the "butcher of Ningirsu." She could also be referred to with the epithet "she who makes the food good." She is also attested in the role of a divine housekeeper. An Early Dynastic text refers to her as an artisan or carpenter (nagar). In various documents, she appears in enumerations of the courtiers of Enlil, with the sequence of Ninimma, Ennugi, Kusu, Ninšar, Ninkasi and Ninmada occurring in at least two sources, An = Anum and the so-called Canonical Temple List.

Her husband was the god Erragal, who like her was associated with knives. He is sparsely attested, and while he was likely distinct in origin from the better known Erra, not much else is possible to determine about him with certainty based on available documents. He might have been associated with the destruction caused by storms.

== Worship ==
In the Early Dynastic period, Ninšar was worshiped in multiple cities, for example Nippur and Shuruppak. The Zame Hymns refer to AB.NAGAR as her cult center. She also had a temple in the state of Lagash built by Uruinimgina, most likely in Girsu.

Evidence for the worship of Ninšar is also available from Umma from the Ur III period. In the same period Shulgi built a temple dedicated to her in Ur.

In the Kassite and Middle Babylonian periods, a temple of Ninšar existed in Nippur, and it is possible that it can be identified with the E-šuluhhatumma, "house worthy of the cleansing ritual," which is assigned to her in the so-called Canonical Temple List without a location specified. ,

The theophoric name Ur-Ninšar is common in sources from the Early Dynastic and Ur III periods. Other names invoking her are known too and continued to appear in the records from the Old Babylonian period.

== Mythology ==
In the myth Enki and Ninmah, Ninšar appears as one of the seven assistants of the eponymous goddess, the other six being Ninimma, Shuzianna, Ninmug, Ninmada, Mumudu and Ninniginna. They do not appear together otherwise. However, in this myth they are collectively described with the term Šassūrātu, a designation of a group of Ninmah's helpers.

In Enki and Ninhursag, she is the daughter of the eponymous deities, and in turn becomes the mother of Ninkurra.

In a text known as The First Brick, which functioned as a formula recited during temple renovations, Ninšar is listed among the deities created by Ea from clay to provide humans with goods they could in turn offer to the gods.

A fragment of a myth known from Abu Salabikh mentions Ninšar slaughtering cattle and sheep while Ninkasi brewed beer.
