= Siris (goddess) =

Mesopotamian goddess of beer

- Goddess of beer
- Other names: Siraš, Zilaš
- Major cult center: Nippur, Ebla

Genealogy
- Parents: possibly Nintiḫal (mother)
- Siblings: Ninkasi

Siris or Siraš was a Mesopotamian goddess associated with beer. She was also worshiped in Ebla, where her name was spelled as Zilaš. Cognates of her name are also present as terms referring to alcoholic beverages or deities associated with them in languages such as Ugaritic and Hebrew. She was closely associated with another goddess of similar character, Ninkasi, though the nature of the connection between them varies between sources. She is attested in a variety of texts, including god lists, offering lists and a variant of the Ballad of Early Rulers.

== Name and character ==
Siris' name was commonly written in cuneiform logographically as ^{d}ŠIM, ^{d}ŠIM✕A, or ^{d}ŠIM✕NINDA, though syllabic phonetic spellings are known too. A theonym attested in the texts from Ebla, Zilaš (^{d}Zi-la-šu), is presumed to be another writing of the name too. Other related theonyms include trṯ, attested in the Ugaritic texts, and Tiršu, known from a theophoric name of a ruler of Hazor mentioned in the Amarna letters, Abdi-Tirši ("servant of Tiršu"). Cognates are also present in Phoenician (trš) and Hebrew (tîrôš) as ordinary nouns referring to wine or grape must. Most likely all of these words were derived from a common Semitic root possibly referring to fermentation, reconstructed as *ṮRŠ by John F. Healey.

In Mesopotamia Siris was associated with beer. As summarized by Manfred Krebernik, she was connected with production, consumption and the effects it had on humans, but not necessarily with innkeepers responsible for its sale. Her name functioned as a metonym for the beverage itself in Akkadian texts. When used in this context, it was written syllabically and without the so-called "divine determinative" (dingir), a sign used to indicate a word is a theonym in cuneiform. The Eblaite sources associate her with wine and honey. In Mesopotamian texts the association between Siris and wine is not directly attested, though Krebernik notes it is not implausible that she was connected with more than one alcoholic beverage in this area.

== Associations with other deities ==
Siris and Ninkasi, another goddess associated with beer, are juxtaposed in various texts, for example in god lists. They could be regarded as sisters as attested in a version of the Weidner god list with explanatory notes from Assur. However, in other sources they could be treated as equivalents, for example in the god list An = Anum and Neo-Assyrian versions of Lugalbanda myths. Richard L. Litke states that a single text might refer to Siris as a male deity and Ninkasi's husband, but according to Manfred Krebernik no references to either of them having a spouse are known. The view that a tradition in which Siris was considered Ninkasi's daughter is documented in some copies of An = Anum is considered unconvincing today. In the Nippur god list, Siris and Ninkasi are preceded by the deity Nintiḫal, who might be the mother of the former. She might be the same deity as Ninti, who was the mother of Ninkasi.

In An = Anum, Siris is listed in a section dedicated to the courtiers of Enlil. Manfred Krebernik argues that the deities of beer were placed in his circle because the goddess responsible for grain from which the beverage was made, Nisaba, was closely associated with him due to being viewed as his mother-in-law. A text only known from late copies referred as Gattung II in Assyriological literature refers to Siris as the "great cook of An," but this role is not attested for her otherwise. In Ebla, Siris (Zilaš) was associated with a local version of the god Ea, Ḥayya. In a Mesopotamia incantation to which Wilfred G. Lambert assigned the title The First Brick, Siris is said to be one of the deities created by Ea from clay taken from the Apsu.

In a number of texts, Siris appears alongside Ningishzida. For example, tablet VII of Maqlû contains a formula labeled as "the incantation of Siris and Ningishzida." They are also invoked together in Muššu'u and in Šurpu. The connection might be based on a shared association with alcohol, as it is sometimes assumed Ningishzida was associated with wine. An alternate proposal is that it depended on his character as an underworld god, as underworld and beer deities might have been associated with each other to illustrate the negative effects of excessive alcohol consumption. In the Weidner god list, Siris and other beer deities are placed between Laṣ and Nungal, which might be another example supporting the latter theory.

== Attestations ==
The oldest reference to Siris occurs in an Eblaite offering list, while in Mesopotamia the first known instance of her name spelled syllabically occurs in an Old Babylonian incantation from Isin. She is also attested in various god lists, including An = Anum, the Nippur god list and the Weidner god list.

A single theophoric name invoking Siris has been identified in the corpus of texts from Nippur from the Kassite period. According to the Nippur Compendium, a text known from Neo-Babylonian copies, she was worshiped in the temple of Gula in this city, which at the time bore the ceremonial name Eurusagga. She is still attested in a text from this city from the Achaemenid period. Siris was also worshiped in Assur, where she had her own sanctuary, in Isin, and in Babylon in the temple of Mandanu, Erabriri, where she had a seat named Ekurunna, "house of liquor."

A variant of the Ballad of Early Rulers from Ugarit and Emar adds a reference to Siris which is not attested in known Mesopotamian copies of the same text. The composition is often interpreted as an example of "wisdom literature" or as a drinking song. The exact reasons behind Siris' inclusion are not certain. The line mentioning her is a blessing, "may Siraš rejoice over you!" It has been suggested that while only attested in Syrian copies of the text, it nonetheless originates in a variant of the composition which originally arose in Mesopotamia.

According to Julia M. Asher-Greve, Siris might also be represented in Mesopotamian visual arts, as a seal with a depiction of two goddesses seemingly holding drinking cups according to her might be a depiction of this goddess and Ninkasi. Another similar image has been identified on an object which might have originally been a part of an instrument or a gaming board.
