= Ninhursag =

Sumerian goddess

Ninhursag 𒀭𒊩𒌆𒄯𒊕
- Mother goddess, goddess of fertility, mountains, and rulers
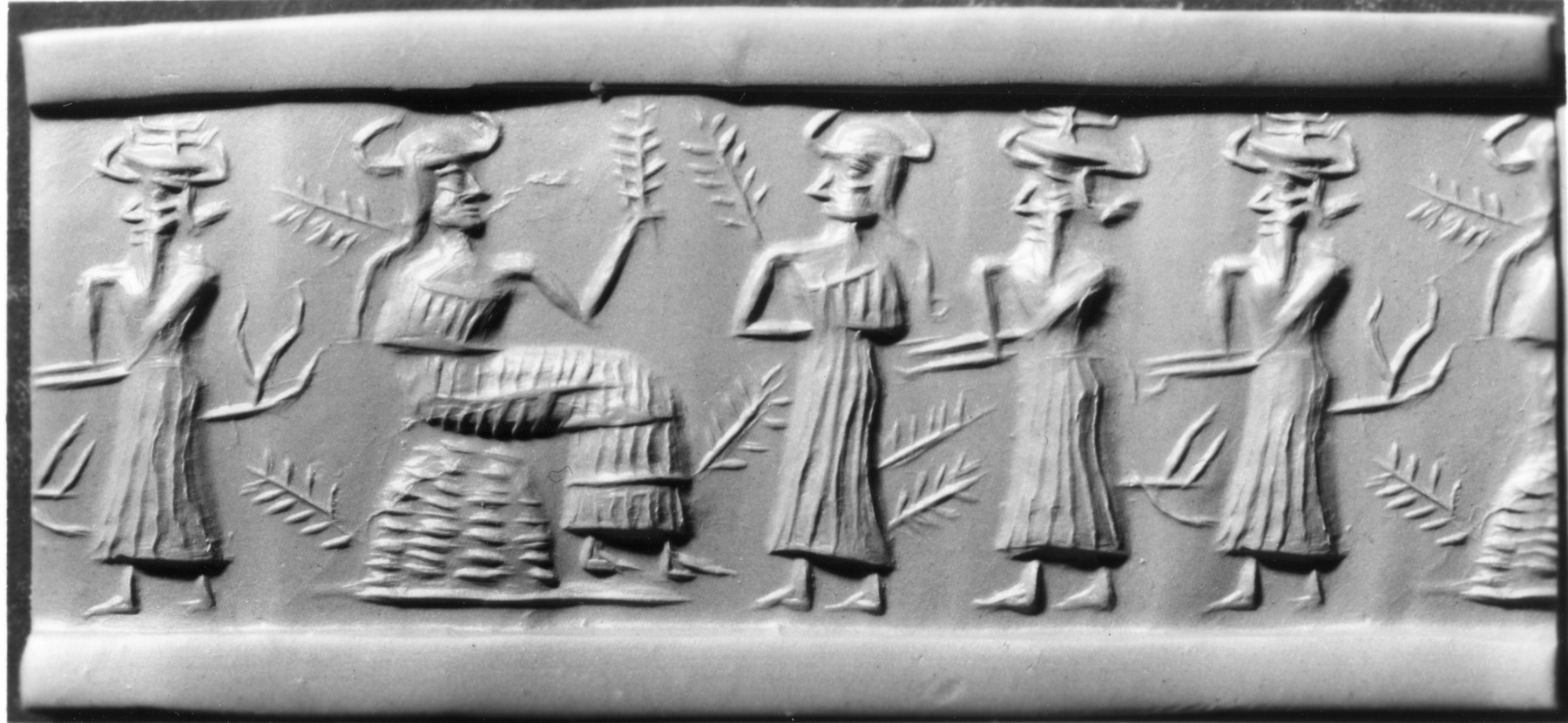
- Akkadian cylinder seal impression depicting a vegetation goddess, possibly Ninhursag, sitting on a throne surrounded by worshippers (circa 2350–2150 BC)
- Symbol: Omega-like symbol

Genealogy
- Siblings: Enlil, Enki, Adad
- Consort: Šulpae; Enlil (only in Lagash and other early traditions); Enki (only in Enki and Ninhursag through syncretism with Damgalnuna)
- Children: Ashgi, Panigingarra, Lisin, Egime, and Lillu (with Šulpae); fifteen other children, consisting of Atugula, Atutur, Ninšar, NIG-gumaḫa, Burukaš, Zarzaru, Zurmuzarmu, Nin-BUR.SAL, Šazumaḫ, Ušumšasu, Naĝaršaga, Anmea, Amaea, UR-guru, Urra, and Amaniranna; Ninurta (only in Lagash and other early traditions)

Equivalents
- Elamite: Kiririsha
- Syrian: Shalash
- Hittite: Ḫannaḫanna
- Ugaritic: Athirat

Ninḫursaĝ (Sumerian: 𒀭𒎏𒄯𒊕, romanized: Ninḫarsang; ^{D}NIN-ḪAR.SAG̃), sometimes transcribed Ninursag, Ninḫarsag, or Ninḫursaĝa, also known as Damgalnuna or Ninmah, was the ancient Sumerian mother goddess of the mountains, and one of the seven great deities of Sumer. She is known earliest as a nurturing or fertility goddess. She is the tutelary deity to several Sumerian leaders.

Her best-known myths are Enki and Ninhursag describing her dealings with Enki resulting from his sexual exploits, and Enki and Ninmah a creation myth wherein the two deities compete to create humans. She is referenced or makes brief appearances in others as well, most notably as the mother of Ninurta in the Anzû Epic.

== Name ==
Ninhursag means "lady of the sacred mountain" from Sumerian NIN "lady" and ḪAR.SAG̃ "sacred mountain, foothill", possibly a reference to the site of her temple, the E-Kur (House of mountain deeps) at Eridu. She had many names including Ninmah ("Great Queen"); Nintu ("Lady of Birth"); Mamma or Mami (mother); Aruru (Sumerian: 𒀭𒀀𒊒𒊒) and Belet-Ili (mistress of the gods, Akkadian).

According to the 'Ninurta's Exploits' myth, her name was changed from Ninmah to Ninhursag by her son Ninurta. As Ninmena, according to a Babylonian investiture ritual, she placed the golden crown on the king in the Eanna temple.

Possibly included among the original mother goddesses was Damgalnuna/Diĝirmaḫ (great wife of the prince) or Damkina (Sumerian: 𒀭𒁮𒆠𒈾, “true wife”), the consort of the god Enki.

Nintur was another name assigned to Ninhursag as a birth goddess, though sometimes she was a separate goddess entirely.

The mother goddess had many epithets including shassuru or 'womb goddess', tabsut ili 'midwife of the gods', 'mother of all children' and 'mother of the gods'. In this role she is identified with Ki in the Enuma Elish. She had shrines in both Eridu and Kish. However, it has also been proposed that the name Ninhursag in documents from Mari should be understood as a logographic writing of the name Shalash, the wife of Dagan, who was the goddess of Bitin near Alalakh rather than Nagar (modern Tell Brak) in the Khabur Triangle. Belet Nagar has alternatively been identified with Hurrian deities: Shaushka (though this proposal was met with criticism) or Nabarbi.

=== Diĝirmaḫ ===
Dingirmah ("great goddess") was a very common epithet of Ninhursag. In older literature, the name was transcribed as ^{d}Mah, but the correct reading was confirmed through the existence of a syllabically written Emesal form, Dimmermah.

Although she was originally an epithet of Ninhursag, Dingirmah eventually developed into a separate goddess at the end of the Early Dynastic period. In the Nippur god list, Dingirmah was one of the nine goddesses of birth enumerated after Šulpae, and the Isin god list similarly included her as one of six birth goddesses. Dingirmah was also present in the An = Anum god list, which listed her alongside Ninhursag, Ninmah, Aruru and Nintur. It is uncertain whether these were all regarded as variant names for the same goddess or different goddesses with similar functions.

A temple dedicated to Dingirmah, the E-maḫ, was built in Adab by a local ruler. Another temple was built at Malgium by King Ipiq-Ištar.

=== Ninmaḫ ===
Ninmah ("great lady") was one of the most common epithets of Ninhursag alongside Dingirmah. The name was already attested in Fara and pre-Sargonian Lagash, and primarily occurred in liturgical and literary texts. An Akkadian form, Ereshmah (written syllabically as e-re-eš-ma-aḫ), was attested at Ugarit, and was either a variant or the correctly written form of the name.

Like Dingirmah, Ninmah was initially an epithet of Ninhursag who later developed into a separate goddess at the end of the Early Dynastic period. In Lagash, King Entemena built a temple that was at first dedicated to Ninhursag, and then rededicated to Ninmah.

In a text known as Archive of Mystic Heptads, Ninmah was labeled separately from Ninhursag as the "Bēlet-ilī of the Emaḫ temple" in an enumeration of seven goddesses of birth.

=== Nintur ===
Nintur was a goddess of birth who was initially regarded as a fully distinct goddess from Ninhursag, as indicated in the Temple Hymns. Her name is translated as "mistress birth-hut". Thorkild Jacobsen suggested that the element TU had been derived from the Sumerian word šà-tùr (meaning "womb, uterus"), which is generally regarded as accurate. Scholars such as Gebhard J. Selz proposed a different interpretation that TU was instead derived from the Sumerian verb utud, meaning "to give birth", thus rendering the theonym as Nintud. However, this interpretation has been contested on phonological grounds.

She is first attested in the god lists from Early Dynastic Fara and Abu Salabikh, in which her name was written as ^{d}Tur, without the NIN sign. Nintur was also mentioned in the Zame Hymns from the same period, in which the nineteenth hymn referred to her as the tutelary goddess of Kesh, a role that was eventually transferred to Ninhursag. However, the goddesses were not immediately syncretized in Kesh, as one of the Temple Hymns treated Nintur as a distinct figure and credited her with beautifying Ninhursag's temple in the city. In the Kesh temple hymn, the goddesses were considered synonymous, with Ninhursag and Nintur being interchangeably used as the names of the mother of Ashgi.

In Adab, like in Kesh, Nintur was initially still regarded as a distinct goddess, and was referenced in a hymn dedicated to Ninhursag of Adab, in which she, as "Mother Nintur", was said to have determined the destiny of the E-maḫ, Ninhursag's temple in Adab, alongside Enlil and Enki.

In pre-Sargonian Lagash, Nintur occurred in offering lists as a minor goddess, and had two additional local manifestations: Nin-tur_{5}-ama-uru-da-mu_{2}-a ("Nintur, mother who grew with the city") and Nin-tur_{5}-za_{3}-ga ("Nintur of the Sanctuary"), which were names of statues dedicated to her. However, it is doubtful that she was considered a separate goddess, and had been syncretized with Ninhursag by the time of Gudea, the ruler of Lagash during the Gutian Dynasty. An inscription on one of Gudea's statues that he had placed in a temple of Ninhursag contained an inscription addressing Ninhursag as Nintur, although this inscription is the only known instance of the goddesses being syncretized in Lagash.

== Function ==
As evidenced by the large number of names, epithets, and areas of worship associated with her cult, Ninhursag's function in religion had many different aspects and shifted notably over time. Ninhursag was not the tutelary goddess of any major city, her cult presence being attested first in smaller towns and villages. It is possible that she was viewed originally more as a nurturing than a birth goddess. Another theory posits that, along with the goddess Nintur, she was the birth goddess of wild and domesticated animals. Her connection to the biological process of childbirth in worship is suspected to have developed later, as she began to by syncretized with other 'birth-goddesses', and took on her Bēlet-ilī name. In this birth aspect, she is called by the kings of Lagash as "the midwife who suckled them". From the third Early Dynastic Period and onward, the most common Ninhursag epithets emphasize her as the supreme "mother of the world". This term of mother, Julia Asher-Greve and Joan Westenholz argue, was analogous to the generic 'father' used for gods such as Anu and Enki, and therefore transcends the biological concept of motherhood. Later in the Neo-Sumerian Period she became more associated with the physical process of birth. (i.e. her offerings including umbilical cord cutters). In the Old Babylonian Period some posit a decline in her worship, as she loses her high status as part of the four supreme deities of the pantheon. However Westenholz posits that her cult continued to be relevant but shifted function, as she became Bēlet-ilī.

She had a documented role in Sumerian kingship ideology. The first known royal votive gift, recovered from Kiš, was donated by a king referring to himself as ‘beloved son of Ninḫursaĝa'. Votive objects dedicated to her Diĝirmaḫ name were recovered in Adab, dating to the Early Dynastic Period.

She could also be understood not simply as affiliated with mountains, but as a personification of mountain (or earth) as well. One text in Sumerian, the Disputation between Summer and Winter, describes the creation of the seasons as a result of the copulation of Ninhursag (the earth) and Enlil. Another temple hymn from Gudea praising Ningirsu (epithet of Ninurta) describes him as having been born by a mountain range. She had a connection to the wild animals, particularly deer, who dwell on or around the mountains. Stags appear in façade on the walls of her temples, as well as in works containing the lion headed eagle, a symbol of Ninurta. One composition, a dedication of Ninhursag's Kes temple, mentions deer, bison, and wild goats in connection to the building.

She and her other names could also appear in ritual incantations for a variety of functions, some of which include Damgalnunna to protect from evil demons, and Ninhursaga and Nintur in birth related incantation. As Ninmah she has appeared occasionally in medical texts, such as one from Sultantepe which describes a ritual and offerings to be performed for the goddess in order to cure bedwetting. It is suggested that her role in performing healing connects to that of her healing Enki in Enki and Ninhursag.

== Association with other deities ==
=== Family ===
Ninhursag's parentage and ancestry is not described in any known texts. In the Hymn of Adad, the eponymous storm god is referred to as Bēlet-ilī's brother.

=== Consorts and children ===
Ninhursag's most well attested consort was Šulpae, who could be described as her "beloved spouse". They were attested as consorts in sources from Kesh, such as the Kesh Temple Hymn, and Nippur.

Deities who were regarded as the children of Ninhursag and Šulpae include Ashgi, Paniĝinĝarra, Lisin, Egime, and Lillu, who was possibly identical with Ashgi. Marcos Such-Gutiérrez suggests that Ashgi was initially Ninhursag's husband in Adab due to Šulpae being sparsely attested in sources from this city from the third millennium BCE, and was only viewed as her son in later periods. Paniĝinĝarra could appear alongside his mother in sources such as greeting formulas in letters. Although Ninhursag was generally identified as Lisin's mother, at least one text equated them with each other instead. According to the god list An = Anum, Lisin (who here had swapped genders) was a son of Belet-Ili. Egime resided at her mother's Emaḫ temple in Adab, and appeared alongside Ninhursag in the lament Lulil and his sister, in which the two mourned the death of Ashgi (referred to in the text as Lulil, meaning "man-spirit").

In the An = Anum god list, Ninhursag was assigned sixteen additional children besides Paniĝinĝarra, Lillu, Ashgi, and Lisin, named Atugula, Atutur, NIN.LA_{2}, NIG-gumaḫa, Burukaš, Zarzaru, Zurmuzarmu, Nin-BUR.SAL, Šazumaḫ, Ušumšasu, Naĝaršaga, Anmea, Amaea, UR-guru, Urra, and Amaniranna. NIN.LA_{2} is generally accepted to be the same goddess as Egime, because NIN was glossed as e-gi, while the sign LA_{2} (𒇲) is believed to have been derived from ME (𒈨).

In Lagash, she was associated with Enlil as his wife, and the mother of Ningirsu (Assimilated with Ninurta.) She is Ninurta's mother as Bēlet-ilī/Mami in Anzû and other myths as well. Some Sumerian sources identify her as both Enlil's wife and sister, likely to rectify earlier traditions where she was Enlil's spouse, before later traditions had the goddess Ninlil as his wife instead. After this change Ninhursag was reassigned as Enlil's elder sister.

Enki was portrayed as Ninhursag's consort in the myth Enki and Ninhursag, in which the eponymous goddess is treated as the same deity as Damgalnuna, Enki's usual wife. However, Dina Katz points out that the goddesses were usually separate. In Enki and Ninmah, Enki instead refers to Ninmah as his sister.

=== Attendants ===
In the An = Anum god list, Dingirmah was assigned a sukkal ("divine vizier") named Ekigara.

Her chief herald was the god Urumaš, and four additional deities who served as heralds were included in her entourage. Saparnuna was the herald of Kesh, Engal-DU.DU and Nimgir-Kurra were the heralds of the underworld, and Lugaligipirig was the herald of Adab. Six deities named Saĝšutašubšuba, KA.NI-šu-KID.DU.DU, Adgigi, Gudub, Ekurabsa, and Nin-Aruru (not to be confused with Aruru) were designated as her gud-balaĝ ("bull lyres"). Additionally, Šulpaedara, Šulpaeamaš, and Tuduga served as the "standing gods" of her E-maḫ temple in Adab.

Ninhursag in her mother/birth aspects was also likely affiliated with a group of seven minor goddesses known as the Šassūrātu, "wombs", who were assistants of mother goddesses. These seven appear in Enki and Ninmah to assist in fashioning humankind from clay alongside their mistress, and are listed as Ninimma, Shuzianna, Ninmada, Ninšar, Ninmug, Mumudu, and Ninniginna.

=== Syncretism ===
Ninhursag was considered to be similar to the Elamite goddess Kiririsha, who was also regarded as the "mother of the gods". Frédéric Grillot considered them to be equivalent to one another, but partially based his conclusion on an assumed parallel between the presumed union of Ninhursag and Enki with that of Kiririsha and Napirisha.

In Old Babylonian Mari the logographic writing ^{d}NIN.HUR.SAG.GA was used to represent the name of Shalash, the wife of Dagan.

In Hittite sources, the logographic writings DINGIR.MAH and ^{d}NIN.TU were used to render the name of the Hittite mother goddess Ḫannaḫanna.

In a bilingual Akkadian-Amorite lexical list from the Old Babylonian period which presumably originated in southern Mesopotamia, DIĜIR.MAḪ (Bēlet-ilī) was equated with an Amorite deity named ʔAṯeratum (a-še-ra-tum), but according to Andrew R. George and Manfred Krebernik in this context the name designated Athirat, the goddess also known from Ugarit, rather than the Mesopotamian goddess Ašratum.

== Iconography ==
Ninhursag was commonly depicted seated upon or near mountains, her hair sometimes in an omega shape and at times wearing a horned head-dress and tiered skirt. In a rectangular framed plaque from pre-Sargonic Girsu, the goddess seated upon "scale like" mountains is determined to be Ninhursag. Here she wears a crown that is more flat without horns, and has hair in an omega like shape. In another depiction, she is seated upon mountains and also has a mountain on her horned crown. Here she wears a tiered robe. She was identified as the female figure standing behind her son Ninurta on a fragment of the Stele of the Vultures.

Another symbol of hers was Deer, both male and female. Studies on a plaque from Mari have identified the stone as being a representation of her. The stone likely represents both a face and the naked female form. A notable feature of the plaque is the area below the 'nose area' where ten stags stand eating plants on opposite sides of the face. There is another group of five animals under the nose, which are suspected to be birds. In a frieze recovered from the same Mari temple, two stags flank an Igmud-eagle, the symbol of her son Ninurta. There are a number of other images with this eagle as well (such as the vase in the gallery below), where deer, ibexes or gazelles are present to represent Ninhursag.

According to Johanna Stuckey, her symbol, resembling the Greek letter omega Ω, has been depicted in art from approximately 3000 BC, although more generally from the early second millennium BC. It appears on some boundary stones (kudurru) on the upper tier, indicating her importance. The omega symbol is associated with the Egyptian cow goddess Hathor, and may represent a stylized womb. Joan Goodnick Westenholz and Julia M. Asher-Greve argue that the symbol should be interpreted as a schematic representation of a woman's hair rather than the shape of an uterus. They tentatively propose an identification with Nanaya rather than Ninhursag as well.

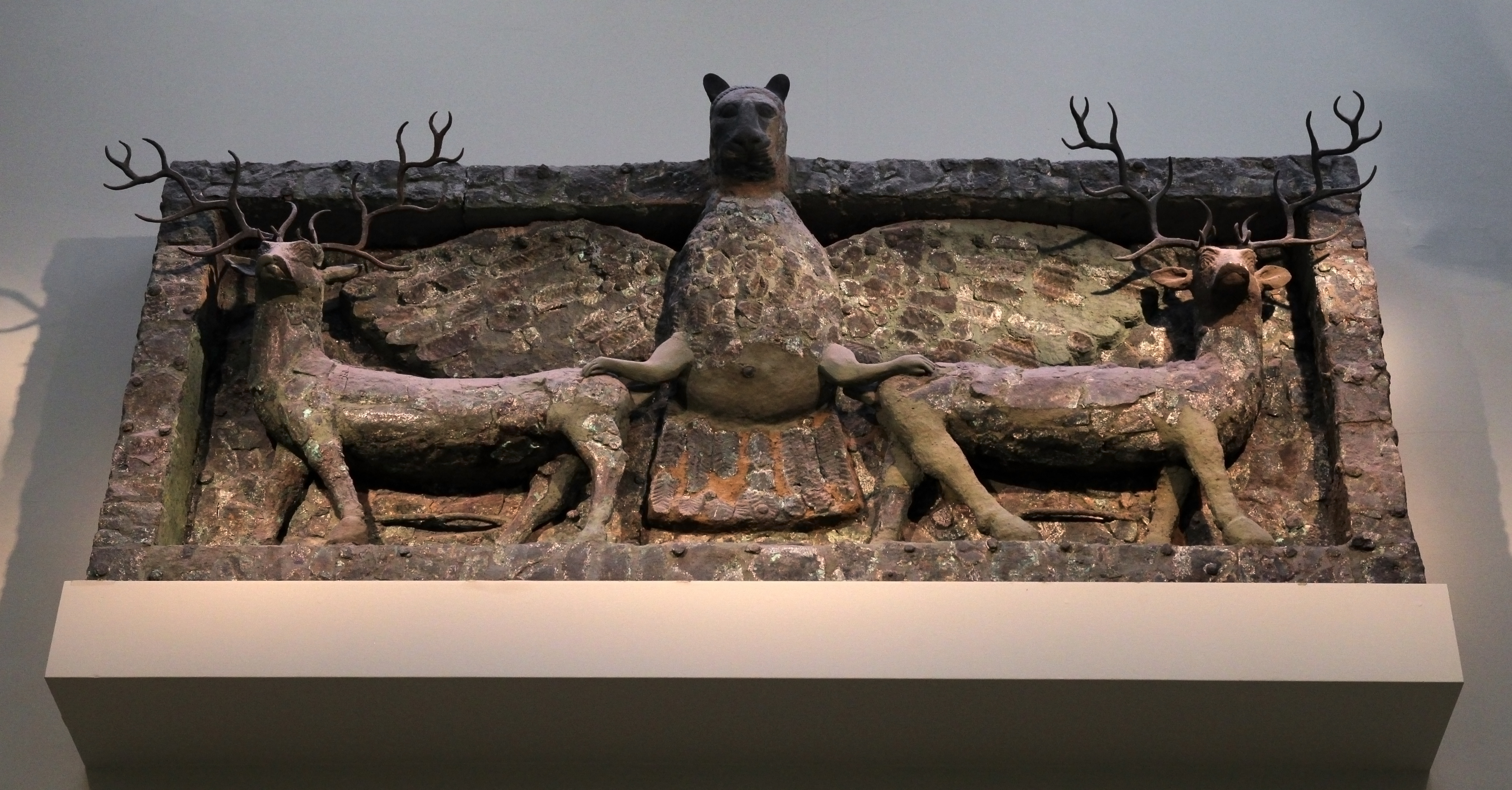
Mari temple frieze: containing symbols of Ninhursag and her son Ninurta.

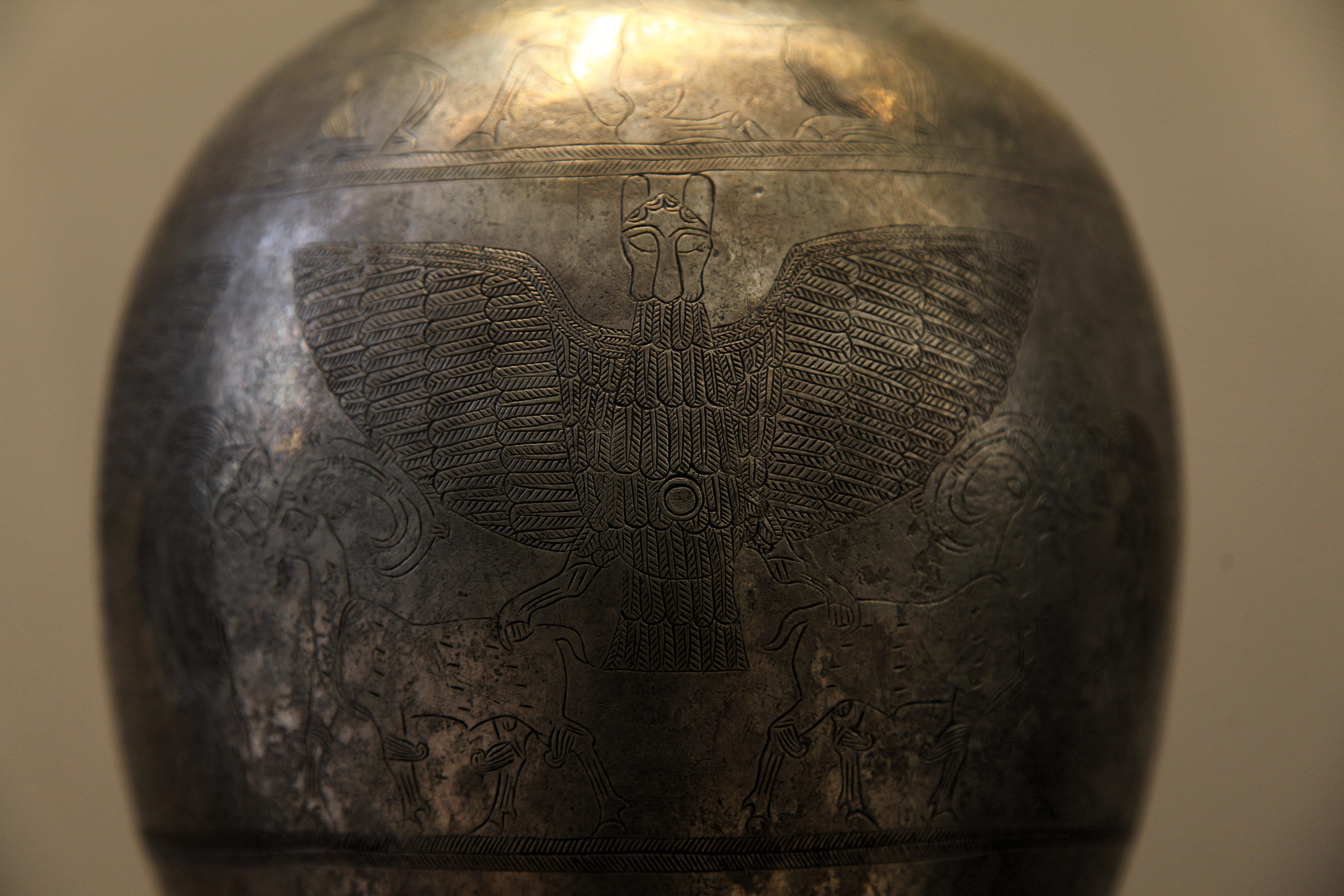
The Silver vase of En-temena, which was dedicated to Ningirsu.

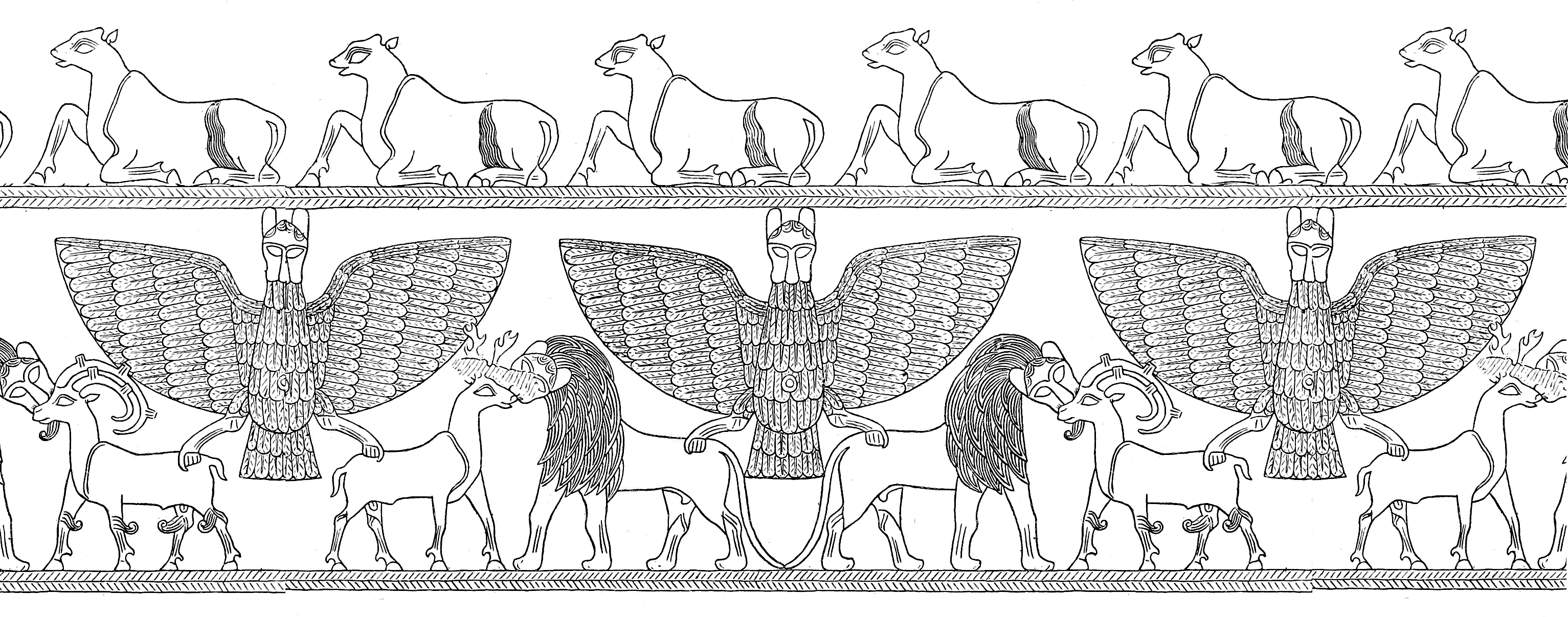
Detail on the En-temena vase - the stags here likely represent Ninhursag, with the lions greeting them in a friendly way by licking their cheeks, rather than attacking them.

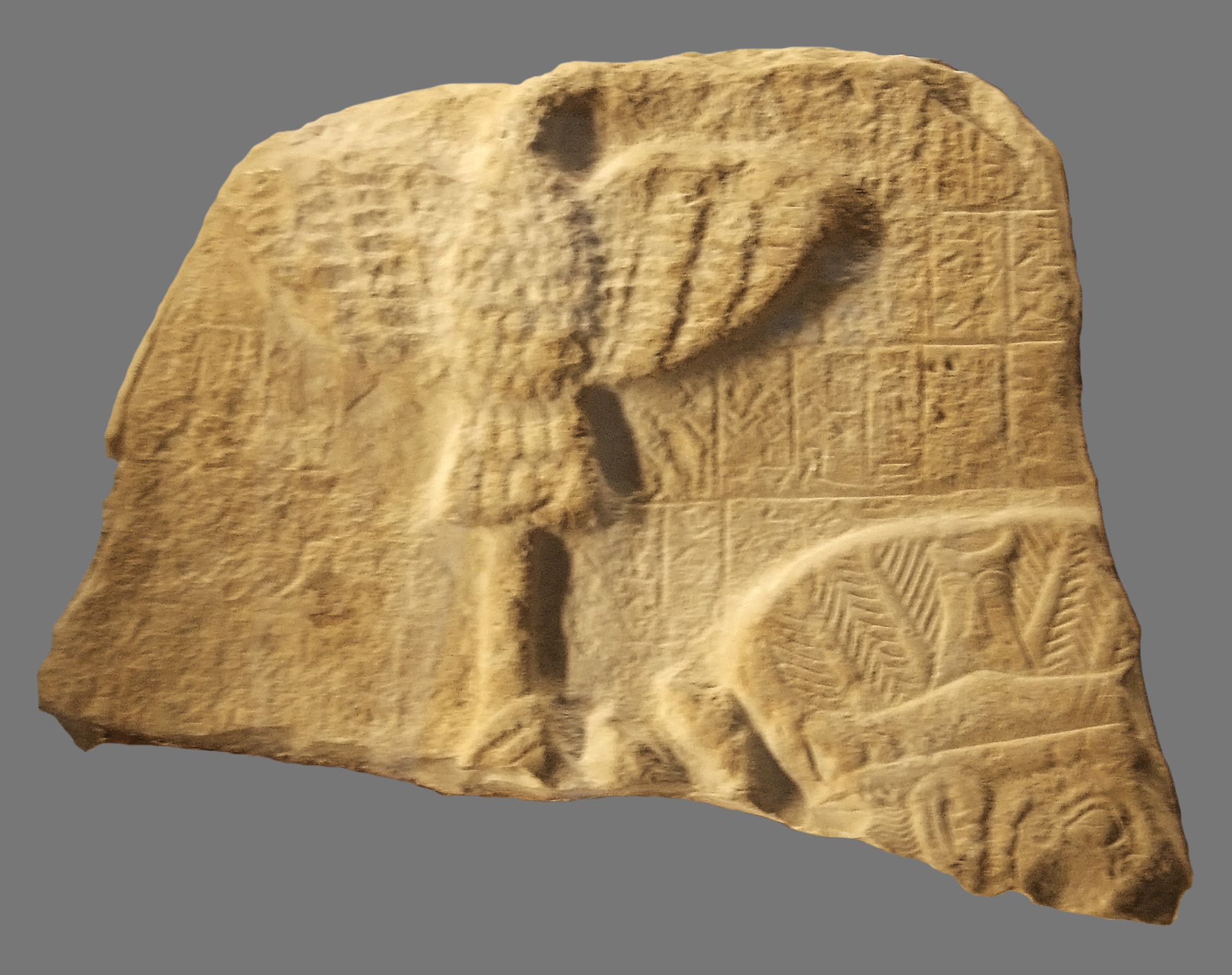
This is the fragment of the Vulture Stele that (likely) contains Ninhursag.

== Mythology ==
=== Enki and Ninhursag ===
Two full copies of Enki and Ninhursag have been uncovered. One is from Nippur which contains the complete text (although some passages on the tablet are broken), and another from Ur, found in the house of a priest of Enki, where half of the text is missing. This second tablet contains fewer lines, and hence it is considered a truncated version. There exists also an excerpt, covering the incestuous couplings, which differs from the Nippur version's events.

In Enki and Ninhursag, the goddess complains to Enki that the city of Dilmun is lacking in water. As a result, Enki makes the land rich, and Dilmun becomes a prosperous wetland. Afterwards, he and Ninhursag sleep together, resulting in a daughter, Ninsar (called Ninnisig in the ETCSL translation, Ninmu by Kramer). Ninsar matures quickly, and after Enki spots her walking along the bank, sleeps with her, resulting in a daughter, Ninkurra. Enki spots her and sleeps with her as well, resulting in Uttu. (In alternate versions the order is Ninkura, Ninima, then Uttu.) After Enki has intercourse with Uttu, Ninhursag removes the semen from her womb and plants it in the earth, causing eight plants to spring up. As a result of his actions, Ninhursag curses Enki by casting her "life giving eye" away from him. Enki then becomes gravely ill. A fox then makes an offer to Enlil that he will bring Ninhursag back to cure him; in exchange Enlil promises to erect two birch trees for the fox in his city, and to give the creature fame. The fox is able to retrieve Ninhursag, and she then cures Enki, giving birth to eight minor deities from his ailing body parts.

Comparisons between this myth and that of Genesis are common. As suggested by Samuel Kramer and W. F. Albright, Enki's eating of the eight plants and the consequences following his actions can be compared to the consumption of the fruit of knowledge by Adam and Eve.

=== Enki and Ninmah ===
The text containing this myth has been recovered on tablets from varying locations. The primary two making up the translation are from the Old Babylonian period and were recovered from Nippur. A third tablet from this period was also found containing an extract of the middle of the myth as well. There was also a bilingual (Sumerian and Akkadian) version in the library of Assurbanipal, and one very fragmented tablet from the Middle Assyrian period that may contain the myth, but deviates from the bilingual version in the creation portion of the myth.

Enki and Ninmah as a narrative can be separated into two distinct parts, the first being the birth of mankind, and the second a competition between the two spouses. The first half of this text recounts Enki creating the first humans at the behest of Namma, referred to here as his mother. He receives help forming the body of men and women from Ninmah as well as her seven servants, the birth goddesses. Once man is finished the group has a banquet, where Enki and Ninmah drink beer and the other gods praise Enki's greatness. In the second half, Ninmah creates seven humans with illnesses and disabilities, for whom Enki finds places in society. Enki then creates an individual so damaged that Ninmah cannot find a place for them, resulting in her losing the competition. She then complains that Enki has driven her away from her home. The ending of the text is not well understood (due to damage on the tablet), but is likely Enki consoling Ninmah and possibly finding a place for the human he made.

=== Others ===
Ninhursag appears in the text Creator of the Hoe, where she is referred to as "the mother of the gods".

In the Anzû epic, Ninhursag under the name Bēlet-ilī or Mami speaks in support of Ninurta her son, and is given the epithet "The Mistress of All Gods". In another myth involving her son, Ninurta's Exploits, the titular god goes out to conquer the mountain land to the north of Babylonia, and piles the bodies of its stony kings into a great burial mound. He then dedicates this mountain to his mother, once Ninmah, now renamed Ninhursag after the mound.

Damkina is the mother of Marduk in Enūma Eliš.

== Worship ==
Theories posit that, in earlier times, Ninhursag was the highest ranking female deity, but was later displaced from that status by Ninlil, before the Old Babylonian period where she was syncretized with other birthing goddesses.

As Ninhursaga, she had temples in Nippur (Ur III period), and Mari. In Adab, she was worshipped under her Diĝirmaḫ epithet. Under her Ninmah epithet, she had temples in Adab, Babylon, and Ĝirsu, known as 'E-maḫ' or the 'majestic house'.

A temple of hers from Ur's Early Dynastic Period (Mesopotamia) was excavated by Sir Leonard Woolley during his series of excavations at various sites around the city, built presumably by a King A'annepada, as per the temple dedication: "Aanepada King of Ur, son of Mesanepada King of Ur, has built this for his lady Ninkhursag." In Early Dynastic Lagash, a temple was dedicated to Ninhursag, then later to Ninmaḫ.

An inscribed door socket was found at an unexcavated mound on the Adaim river near where it meets the Tigris river, Khara'ib Ghdairife. It read "Manistusu, king of Kis, builder of the temple of the goddess Ninhursaga in HA.A KI. Whoever removes this tablet, may Ninhursaga and Samas uproot his seed and destroy his progeny."

== See also ==
- Ereshkigal
- Eve
- Inanna
