= NIN (cuneiform) =

Sumerian word

Cuneiform NIN ("lady") sign, a ligature of MUNUS (𒊩) and TÚG (𒌆)

The Sumerian word NIN (𒊩𒌆), later borrowed into Akkadian, was used to denote a queen or a priestess, and is often translated as "lady". Other translations include "queen", "mistress", "proprietress", and "lord". The word EREŠ, also meaning "queen" or "lady", is written using the cuneiform sign for NIN as well.

Many goddesses are called NIN or EREŠ, such as ^{D}NIN.GAL ("great lady"), ^{D}É.NIN.GAL ("lady of the great temple"), ^{D}EREŠ.KI.GAL, and ^{D}NIN.TI.

The compound form NIN.DINGIR ("divine lady" or "lady [of a] god"), denotes a priestess.

== In writing ==
NIN originated as a ligature of the cuneiform glyphs of MUNUS (𒊩) and TÚG (𒌆); the NIN sign was written as MUNUS.TÚG (𒊩𒌆) in archaic cuneiform, notably in the Codex Hammurabi. The syllable nin, on the other hand, was written as MUNUS.KA (𒊩𒅗) in Assyrian cuneiform. MUNUS.KU = NIN_{9} (𒊩𒆪) means "sister".

Basic cuneiform MUNUS sign ("woman")

Basic cuneiform TÚG sign (syllable ku)

== Occurrence in the Gilgamesh epic ==
Ninsun (^{D}NIN.SÚN) as the mother of Gilgamesh in the Epic of Gilgamesh (standard Babylonian version), appears in 5 of the 12 chapters (tablets I, II, III, IV, and XII). The other personage using NIN is the god Ninurta (^{D}NIN.URTA), who appears in Tablet I, and especially in the flood myth of Tablet XI.

Of the 51 uses of NIN, the other major usage is for the Akkadian word eninna (nin as in e-nin-na, but also other variants). Eninna is the adverb "now", but it can also be used as a conjunction, or as a segue-form (a transition form).

The two uses of NIN as the word for "sister" (Akkadian ahātu), for example, are used in Tablet 8 (The Mourning of Enkidu), line 38:

"May…
"May the brothers go into mourning over you like sisters…"

== See also ==
- Bel (mythology)
- EN (cuneiform)
- Nin-anna
- Nin-hursag
- Nin-imma
- Nin-isina
- Nin-ildu
- Puabi-Nin
- Ninkasi
