= Ancestors of Enlil =

Mesopotamian primordial deities

- Primordial deities
- Major cult center: Nippur
- Abode: underworld
- Tree: tamarisk
- Offspring: Enlil, Nuska

Equivalents
- Hurrian: Hurrian primeval deities
- Ugaritic: Ilib

Ancestors of Enlil or Enki-Ninki deities were a group of Mesopotamian deities. Individual lists do not agree on their number, though the enumerations always start with the pair Enki (to be distinguished from the water god Enki) and Ninki and end with Enlil. In the earliest recorded lists, Enki and Ninki were the immediate parents of Enlil, but beginning in the Ur III period onwards, a growing number of 'ancestors' separated them. Enki and Ninki became primordial, ancestral beings who were no longer active and resided in the underworld. They could be invoked in exorcisms. They are attested in various texts, including god lists, incantations, prayers and myths.

== Terminology ==
The term "ancestors of Enlil" refers to a group of Mesopotamian deities. They are already attested in Early Dynastic sources. The same group is sometimes instead referred to as "Enki-Ninki deities" (German: Enki-Ninki-Gottheiten), an approximate translation of the plural ^{(d)}En-ki-(e-)ne-^{(d)}Nin/Nun-ki-(e-)ne, derived from the names of the pair Enki and Ninki, and used to refer to all of these deities collectively in primary sources. Wilfred G. Lambert proposed the English translation "Enkis and Ninkis". He also coined the term "theogony of Enlil" to refer to the lists of these divine ancestors. The latter label is also used by Andrew R. George.

The names Enki and Ninki refer to a pair typically opening lists of ancestors of Enlil. The names of the individual pairs which follow all contain the signs en, "lord", and nin, "lady". In each pair, the en name precedes the nin name. There is no indication that the individual pairs were meant to illustrate the stages of development of the universe. Not all of the names are possible to fully translate.

While Enki and Ninki could be identified in older scholarship as Enki and Damgalnuna, this view is regarded as erroneous. As already noted by Thorkild Jacobsen in 1976, the ancestral deity Enki is to be distinguished from the better known god of the same name, who is associated with fresh water. Wilfred G. Lambert has suggested that the latter name had a different etymology, and due to the presence of an omittible g in spellings such as ^{d}En-ki-ga-ke_{4} assumed that instead of ki, "earth", it was formed with the element kig, of unknown meaning. Jacobsen instead explained the two names as having slightly different meanings from each other, "lord earth" and "lord of the earth". The equation of Enki and Ninki with Ea (Enki) and Damkina (Damgalnuna) in an Emesal vocabulary is isolated and presumably a mistake, and the Emesal forms of the names of the two Enkis, respectively Umunki and Amanki, are not identical.

== Variation ==
The names and number of pairs in lists of Enki-Ninki deities vary in each of the available sources. The only consistent feature is that the first generation consists of Enki and Ninki, and the last generation consists of Enlil and Ninlil. There are no exceptions from the former rule and only one from the latter.

The number of pairs varies from 3 to 21. 7 or 8 appear in Early Dynastic god lists, 9 (10 if Enmešarra is counted) in the Old Babylonian god list from Mari, (Note: In this god list, the usual formula closing the list, ama a-a ^{d}En-lil_{2}-a_{2}-ke_{4}-ne, "the parents of Enlil," was misunderstood as a pair of deities as well, ^{d}En-ama-a-a-^{d}En-lil_{2}-la_{2} and ^{d}Nin-ama-a-a-^{d}En-lil_{2}-la_{2}.) 16 in the Old Babylonian An = Anum forerunner, and 21 in An = Anum (tablet I, lines 96–138). The unusual length of the sequence in the last of these sources was most likely the result of compiling variant traditions. Lambert believes that the intermediary deity pairs between the Enki-Ninki and Enlil-Ninlil pairs function to create a sense of remoteness separating their times.

== Position in Mesopotamian mythology ==
According to Christopher Metcalf, the tradition regarding Enlil's parentage which involved the Enki-Ninki deities is now considered conventional, though relevant sources remain difficult to interpret. Based on the meaning of the names Enki and Ninki, it is presumed it was related to the belief that earth was a primordial element from which everything else emerged. However, Enlil's parentage presumably varied between traditions. He was alternatively regarded as a son of Anu, as attested for example in an inscription of Lugalzagesi. (Note: Xianhua Wang suggests that this tradition reflected an attempt at reconciling two different traditions about the identity of the Mesopotamian king of the gods by making the candidates father and son.) Two sources which include both the pairs Enki and Ninki and An with either Urash or Ki, with the latter placed before them, are also known, and presumably reflect the belief that the coupling of earth and heaven preceded the emergence of the ancestors of Enlil. A further deity who could be regarded as Enlil's father was Lugaldukuga, a figure associated with the “holy mound” (duku).

While Ninlil can be mentioned alongside Enlil in the lists enumerating his ancestors, these deities are never described as the ancestors of both of them, possibly to avoid the implications of incest between them. Wilfred G. Lambert suggested that an alternate interpretation of the lists might have been that each "generation" evolved from the previous one, with Enki and Ninki slowly morphing into Enlil and Ninlil, similarly with no implications of incest.

The ancestors of Enlil were associated with the underworld. However, available sources do not explain how they came to reside there. Andrew R. George suggests that their placement in the underworld simply reflected the fact they were believed to be no longer active. A myth in which Enki and Ninki were banished to the underworld or fled there and found a new role there might have existed, though it is not directly preserved save for a possible allusion in an incantation. A single incantation places them in the Abzu, which is presumed to be a part of a broader pattern of references to underworld deities instead dwelling there.

The names of the primordial deities associated with Enlil could be invoked in exorcisms against evil spirits, though according to Wilfred G. Lambert relevant sources postdate the Old Babylonian period and might represent a tradition which only developed relatively late. However, according to Andrew R. George earlier examples also exist, and typically make Enki and Ninki the figures by which demons are forced to swear oaths in specific exorcisms. As primordial deities, they might have been invoked in this context as a representation of the state of the universe before the emergence of forces they were meant to counter.

== Attestations ==
The oldest references to the ancestors of Enlil have been identified in the Fara and Abu Salabikh god lists from the Early Dynastic period. They have been dated to the middle of the third millennium BCE. They are also present in a short passage from an early literary text:

At that time Enki and Nunki had not emerged, Enlil did not exist, Ninlil did not exist

They are also mentioned in relation with the underworld in a section of the Zame Hymns dedicated to Nergal. The residence of this god is described in it as "the big dwelling, whose shadow spreads in the west over the Enki and Ninki".

Ninki alone is mentioned in the oath formula on Eannatum's Stele of the Vultures, where it is stated that if Umma were to break the promises made, this goddess would punish the city. This formula differs from these assigned to all the other deities invoked in the same text (Enlil, Ninhursag, Enki, Suen and Utu).

In incantations dated to the middle of the third millennium BCE, Enki and Ninki are mentioned in association with roots of the tamarisk. Two examples, presumed to be copies of southern Mesopotamian texts, are known from Ebla:

Tamarisk, unique tree, tree of An, its roots below (are) Enki and Ninki, its branches above (are) An, the princely cleansing priest

Tamarisk, its roots (below) (are) Enki and Ninki, from (its) top (?) (is) Enlil. Tamarisk, by the life of Heaven, the life of Earth, the life of An, Enki, Ninki (you are conjured).

Presumably the tree was believed to "mediate" between Enki and Ninki, who resided in the underworld, and An, who resided in heaven.

A single offering to a goddess named Ninki, made by the queen, is mentioned in another text from Ebla, but according to Alfonso Archi most likely this figure is to be distinguished from the primordial deity bearing the same name. He suggests this name might only be an uncommon spelling of the better attested ^{d}be-munus/^{d}Ba-al_{6}-tum, the spouse of Hadabal. In an earlier publication he also considered it a possibility that she might have been the spouse of the local form of Ea, Ḥayya. "Ninki" is also attested in Ebla as a part of the phrase nin-ki kalam tim^{ki}, “lady of the country”, possibly the epithet of a goddess, and as a title of Tilut, one of the wives of the vizier Ibrium.

According to Wilfred G. Lambert, after the Early Dynastic period a gap in attestations of the ancestors of Enlil occurs, but further sources mentioning them are known from the Old Babylonian period and later. However, Gonzalo Rubio lists a single possible Ur III example, a fragment from Nippur, N-T545 (A 33647), which might be either an incantation or a literary text. It is also assumed that a mourning festival dedicated to them -associated with the duku in Nippur took place annually as early as in the third millennium BCE. Walther Sallaberger argues that ezem dukuga, celebrated there in the Ur III period, can be connected with later rites associated with them. In later periods they appear in various versions of Udug Hul. In Šurpu, the pairs Enki and Ninki and Enšar and Ninšar are invoked.

The ancestors of Enlil are also mentioned in the myth Death of Gilgamesh. The eponymous hero seemingly meets them in the underworld.

He set out these gifts (...),
for Enki and Ninki, Enmul and Ninmul,
Endukuga and Nindukuga,
Endašurima and Nindašurimma,
Enmu-utula, (Note: A variant spelling of Enutila.) Enmešarra,
the female and male ancestors of Enlil.

Enumerations of pairs of ancestors of Enlil also occur in laments dedicated to him, which commonly include long lists of various deities associated with him. An unfinished text of this variety known from the Old Babylonian tablet CBS 10417 mentions a gift he received from the pairs Enki and Ninki and Enul and Ninul. According to Paul Delnero's interpretation of the text, most likely a goddess appeals to Enlil to spare her city from destruction, similarly as Bau does in another similar text, in this case by reminding him of the time when he himself received a city from his ancestors. A prayer to Enlil refers to Enki and Ninki as “the father who begat you”. Jeremiah Peterson has tentatively suggested that a recently published fragmentary text, “The birth of Enlil” (MS 3312), might be an account of the succession from Enki and Ninki to Enlil. However, according to its translator, Christopher Metcalf, the deities mentioned in it are left unnamed, and it is therefore difficult to interpret what theogonic tradition it reflects.

A hymn to Enki might attribute his position as a god associated with water to a collective of Enki-Niki deities. A different composition dedicated to the same god might mentions two of them, Enul and Ninul, in a similar context. A prayer to Shamash and the “gods of the night” invokes Enki and Ninki alongside Alala and Belili, a pair of primordial deities belonging to the family tree of Anu.

A Middle Assyrian text, the so-called "Offering Bread Hemerology", prescribes offering bread to Lugaldukuga, Enki, Enmešarra and the West Wind on the 29th of Tašrītu, an autumn month. Offerings to the ancestors of Enlil are also mentioned in an administrative text from the reign of Nebuchadnezzar II and in so-called Astrolabe B. The latter source specifically refers to a funerary offering made in Tašrītu, and lists Lugaldukuga alongside the pair Enki and Ninki as its recipient. This might have been a rite connected to the akītu festival.

== List of ancestors of Enlil ==
Names	Meaning of the second element	Details
Enki and Ninki	"earth"	A variant spelling of Ninki, Nunki, is also attested. It occurs in Early Dynastic sources from Lagash. Grammatically, both names are appositive rather than genitive constructions, and therefore should be translated as “lady earth” and “lord earth”. However, Ninki's name appears to be understood as a genitive construction, “lady of the earth” or “lady of the underworld”, in Eannatum's inscription on the Stele of Vultures. A late Assyrian copy of an earlier bilingual text refers to Enki and Ninki as the "lords of destinies".
Enul and Ninul	"ancient" or "luxuriance"	A hymn addresses Enul and Ninul as the parents of Nuska. In another composition, they are implored to bring prosperity during the organization of the universe, while in a hymn dedicated to Ishme-Dagan they bless his kingship alongside Enki and Ninki. Ninul also appears in a single theophoric name from Old Akkadian Adab, Ur-Ninul. A reference to Enul might be present in the text UM 29-15-229, a fragment of an explanatory Old Babylonian god list from Nippur. In addition to the existence of the theonym Enul, the term en ul, to be understood as "ancient lord", also appears to function as a less specific designation in a number of compositions, including the Temple Hymns and Inanna and Ebiḫ.
Enmul and Ninmul	"star", "shining"	Enmul and Ninmul never occur in the same sources as Enul and Ninul, with the exception of An = Anum and a single ritual text possibly influenced by god lists, and therefore they might have been understood simply as a variant of Enul and Ninul, with the sign mul read as ul_{10}.
Ennun and Ninnun	"lordly", "much"	
Enkur and Ninkur	"Mountain"	In addition to functioning as the name of a primordial goddess paired with Enkur, Ninkur is also attested as the name of a craftsman deity and as a logographic writing of the name of the wife of Dagan, presumably to be identified as Shalash, in texts from Emar and Mari.
Enkingal and Ninkingal	"leader"	Enkingal and Ninkingal are the Old Babylonian forms of the earlier names Enkungal and Ninkungal, with the second element, originally a term referring to fat-tailed sheep, reinterpreted as a different phonetically similar word.
Enšar and Ninšar	"totality"	Enšar appears in the myth Toil of Babylon, where he is described as the "father of the gods". However, his name might function as an epithet of Lugaldukuga in this context.
Enbuluḫ and Ninbuluḫ		The names Enbulug and Ninbulug attested in an Old Babylonian god list might represent a variant of Enbuluḫ and Ninbuluḫ.
Engiriš and Ningiriš	"butterfly"	According to Antoine Cavigneaux and Manfred Krebernik, Engiriš and Ningiriš most likely correspond to En-UḪ and Nin-UḪ from Early Dynastic sources, with the sign UḪ in the latter name read as either uḫ, "louse", or as giriš_{x}, "butterfly". In An = Anum the variant form Ningaraš, “lady merchant”, occurs.
Endašurimma and Nindašurimma	"dung heap"	Endašurimma and Nindašurimma are first attested in the Old Babylonian period, though they might be identical with an earlier pair from Fara and Abu Salabikh whose names were written with the sign Á or DA. Both of them are addressed as "brother and sister of all the gods" in an incantation, while Endašurimma also appears alongside Endukuga among the keepers of the gates of the underworld in the Sultantepe version of Nergal and Ereshkigal.
Enamaš and Ninamaš	"sheep-pen"	While Enamaš and Ninamaš first occur in the Old Babylonian period, they might correspond to an earlier pair whose name was written with the signs LAK 777.DU_{6}. However, the latter have also been interpreted as an early version of Endukuga and Nindukuga instead.
Endukuga and Nindukuga	"holy hill"	In most Old Babylonian lists, Endukuga and Nindukuga are among the last generations listed, appearing directly before Enlil and the optional Enutila and Enmešarra. They appear alongside Endašurimma and Nindašurimma among underworld deities listed as recipients of offerings in a late Assyrian text. The primordial deity Nindukuga is to be distinguished from the use of the same name as an epithet of Ellamesi, the wife of Šumugan, attested in An = Anum (tablet III, line 205).
Enan(na) and Ninan(na)	"heaven"	the variants Enan and Ninan, "lord heaven" and "lady heaven", are already attested in the Early Dynastic period while Enanna and Ninanna, "lord of heaven" and "lady of heaven" are later reinterpretations; Ninan(na) is to be distinguished from Ninanna understood as an epithet of Inanna (An = Anum, tablet IV, lines 2 and 187),.
Enutila and Ninutila	"past"	The spelling of Enutila's name shows a degree of variety. In some cases, he appears alone, without Ninutila. He was also not always regarded as an ancestor of Enlil. A myth mentioning him, The Defeat of Enutila, Enmešarra, and Qingu, is known, but only 18 lines survive. Andrew R. George suggests that in this context, Enutila is to be understood as Enmešarra's father. According to Wilfred G. Lambert, due to containing descriptions of the defeats of many deities, this text should be understood as a late scholarly compilation of originally separate fragments rather than as a traditional myth.
Enmešarra and Ninmešarra	"countless me"	Enmešarra has been described as the best known of the deities belonging to the category of ancestors of Enlil. However, he was not always counted among them. In some cases he appears alongside the en-nin pairs, but without a corresponding female deity. The goddess Ninmešarra, who is to be distinguished from the identical epithets of Inanna (already attested in the writings of Enheduanna) and Ninlil, most likely only developed after was incorporated into lists of ancestors of Enlil, in order to provide him with a matching spouse. Wilfred G. Lambert suggests that initially a tradition in which Enmešarra was Enlil's father existed and only with time he was instead integrated into the Enki-Ninki tradition. However, he acknowledged that direct statements to that effect are not known, and that in the text Enlil and Namzitarra, Enmešarra is his paternal uncle instead.
Enkum and Ninkum		The names Enkum and Ninkum could be used both as theonyms and as a designation of a type of human functionary. Frans Wiggermann notes that while in some cases they appear among ancestors of Enlil, they are also attested as courtiers of Enki, and on this basis argues it is possible a tradition where they were his ancestors instead existed. A single text connects Enkum with the term kummu, "bedroom", which might indicate that his name was understood as "lord bed", from Sumerian en kum, though this proposal remains unproven.

== Related deities ==
Ancestors of Enlil could sometimes be mentioned alongside other, normally unrelated primordial figures. In An = Anum, Enšar and Ninšar occur among ancestors of Anu, and additionally another listed pair, Enuruulla and Ninuruulla, follows the en-nin pattern. In the so-called Gattung I, a compilation of exorcistic formulas, deities belonging to the lists of ancestors of Anu, namely the pair Enuruulla and Ninuruulla and Anshar and Kishar, occur among ancestors of Enlil instead. An Old Babylonian incantation also links a pair of ancestral deities usually connected to Anu, Dūri and Dāri, with Enlil.

Dina Katz proposes that Ereshkigal might have developed from Ninki. She assumes that the former might have split from the latter at some point between the reign of Eannatum and Uruinimgina. In contrast with Ninki, Ereshkigal does not appear in Early Dynastic god lists.

Andrew R. George has suggested that the portrayal of the ancestors of Enlil as no longer active figures dwelling in the underworld makes it possible to compare them to the so-called "Seven Conquered Enlils". This group of deities was associated with Enmešarra.

According to Alfonso Archi, Mesopotamian primordial deities such as the ancestors of Enlil might have influenced similar groups in Hurrian mythology. Two of such Hurrian deities, Minki and Amunki, might be derived from Ninki and the Emesal form of Enki, Umunki. Wilfred G. Lambert has proposed that their names developed from possible phonetic variants of the Sumerian ones not attested in textual sources. Archi additionally suggests that another of the Hurrian primordial deities, Namšara, might have been derived from Enmešarra.

Karel van der Toorn argues that the Ugaritic god Ilib can be considered a representation of a theological idea analogous to the ancestors of Enlil.
