= Ilib =

Ugaritic deity and religious concept

- Primordial deity and generic term for ancestral spirits
- Other names: Eni attanni, DINGIR a-bi
- Major cult center: Ugarit
- Offspring: possibly El

Equivalents
- Hurrian: Alalu
- Mesopotamian: Ancestors of Enlil
- Phoenician: Elyon

Ilib (also known as eni attanni) was an Ugaritic god most likely regarded as a primordial deity. As a generic term, the word ilib seemingly also referred to spirits of ancestors. The god and the concept were most likely connected with each other. Ilib's role has been compared to that played by deities such as Alalu in Hurrian religion or ancestors of Enlil, for example Enmesharra, in Mesopotamian religion. Offerings to him are mentioned in a number of Ugaritic texts.

== Name ==
The theonym written in the Ugaritic alphabetic script as ‘l’b can be vocalized as Ilib or ‘Ilu’ibī. It is typically translated as "the god, the father" or "the god of the father". The translation "El of the father" is also considered a possibility, though it is less common. It is presumed that the word ab, "father", became ib in Ilib's name through the process of assimilation.

Multilingual texts from Ugarit indicate that Ilib's name was translated as DINGIR a-bi (to be read as ilabi) in Akkadian and as in atn in Hurrian. The vocalized form of the latter name is eni attanni, a plural equivalent, enna atanniwena, is known as well.

== Character ==
According to Dennis Pardee Ilib functioned as a theogonic deity, specifically as the ancestor of the family of El, and by extension of other gods belonging to the Ugaritic pantheon. A similar possibility is accepted by Lluís Feliu as one of the plausible interpretations of Ilib and his relation to El. Ilya Yakubovich proposes interpreting Ilib as a figure similar to Elyon, a creator deity and ancestor of El from a later non-Ugaritic source, Phoenician History of Philo of Byblos.

John F. Healey instead argues Ilib was not a deity, but a generic term for dead ancestors honored by individual families. He assumes that his prominent position in offering lists should be treated as an indication that a family deity of the Ugaritic kings is meant, rather than as an indication that a god senior to El, Baal, Dagan and other deities was believed to exist. A parallel to this understanding of Ilib might be the Eblaite ^{d}A.MU, representing the concept of a person's posthumously deified father.

Karel van der Toorn notes that it is possible both a distinct god named Ilib and a generic concept of an ancestral spirit referred to as ilib coexisted in Ugaritic religion. He proposes the former was a divine reflection of the latter, an ancestor of the gods developed through theological speculation under the influence of Hurrian beliefs about deities such as Alalu and other so-called "Olden Gods", who served as ancestors of other members of the pantheon and were believed to have reigned in distant past. Alfonso Archi argues that to the Hurrians Ilib's translation eni attanni represented a "generic ancestor of the gods". He points out Hurrians might have been influenced both by the western tradition of ancestor worship and by Mesopotamian beliefs about primordial deities who reigned before the currently worshiped ones. A well attested example are the ancestors of Enlil, such as Enmesharra.

A correspondence between Ilib and the Mesopotamian god Ilaba has been suggested by Wilfred G. Lambert. However, Pardee argues their respective characters were not similar and rules out the possibility that the Ugaritic god was derived from the Mesopotamian one. Manfred Krebernik notes that accepting that Ilib was derived from Ilaba would require assuming that the name of this god was reinterpreted after he was introduced into the Ugaritic pantheon.

The proposal that Ilib was an epithet of El is not regarded as plausible.

== In the Ugaritic texts ==
The attestations of Ilib in the Ugaritic texts are scarce. In a standard ritual enumeration of deities, he is listed as the second entry, occurring after the introductory phrase "the gods of Mount Zaphon" and before El. In one of the offering lists, he is the first of the deities mentioned, with the pair ảrṣ w šmm, "Earth and Heaven", separating him from El. A ritual focused on Ilib alone is alluded to in the Ugaritic texts, but no descriptions of it survive. The text RIH 77/2B+ appears to be focused jointly on him and El, and most likely describes ritual contemplation. Ritual texts, for example KTU 1.162, also mention the sacrifice of cattle and rams to him. In KTU 1.109 he is listed among the deities receiving offerings in the temple of Baal alongside El, Baal, Anat and Pidray. The text specifies that the group was honored with a burnt offering (šrp), and that latter Ilib received a lamb in the urbt, presumed to be a window or some type of small sanctuary. The Hurrian translation of Ilib's name appears in Hurrian offering lists from Ugarit, and it is presumed that functionally both deities were the same, similarly to how Nikkal is attested in both Ugaritic and Hurrian texts. He or his plural form occurs in the beginning of such texts, before El, Kumarbi and Teshub.

A reference to Ilib understood as a generic designation for a family deity occurs in the Epic of Aqhat. The concept is referenced in passages describing filial duties. According to this literary text, a son was expected to set up a stela for his father's ilib after his death.

=== Other attestations ===
Only two possible references to Ilib are known from outside Ugarit: he is seemingly mentioned in a damaged bowl inscription from Lachish and in a theophoric name known from a seal from Palestine, though in the latter case most likely a generic ancestor spirit is meant.
