= Lugaldukuga =

Mesopotamian god regarded as father of Enlil in some traditions

Lugaldukuga (Sumerian: "lord of the holy mound") was a Mesopotamian god primarily understood as a theogonic figure. He is best attested as the father of Enlil, the head of the Mesopotamian pantheon, though other traditions about the parentage of the latter also existed, and no references to him in this role are known from before the Kassite period. Sometimes he could also be described as his grandfather instead. He was envisioned as a no longer active and as an inhabitant of the underworld. He could be equated with other deities of similar character, such as Enmesharra. It is not known which part of Mesopotamia he originated in, though references to him are known from texts from both Babylonia and Assyria.

The name Lugaldukuga could also function as an epithet of the god Ea, who was not regarded as Enlil's father.

== Character ==
Lugaldukuga was understood as a primeval deity. Such figures were generally regarded as ancient and no longer active (unlike the regular gods) by the Mesopotamians. Wilfred G. Lambert proposed that Lugaldukuga was originally understood as a "prime mover" in the local theology of a presently unknown small settlement, and only came to be incorporated into major scholarly works at a later date. His name means "lord of the holy mound (the Duku)" in Sumerian. The Duku was regarded as the place where Enlil determined destinies for other deities. It was also believed to be the dwelling of his ancestors. The word has two possible meanings, as the sign du could refer to both a hill and to a brick platform. According to Wilfred G. Lambert, it is possible that they could be interpreted as the cosmic location and its physical representation in Enlil's Ekur temple complex in Nippur.

Lugaldukuga was regarded as the father of Enlil, but the tradition placing him in this role is relatively late. It is first attested in the god list An = Anum, most likely composed in the Kassite period. He is absent from the Old Babylonian forerunner to this composition. Sources referring to him as Enlil's grandfather are also known. Wilfred G. Lambert proposed that this view might originate in a tradition where Enmesharra was identified as Enlil's father, though direct statements confirming the presence of such an idea in Mesopotamian theology are not presently known from any texts.

While Lugaldukuga was most likely assumed to be an inhabitant of the underworld, a single source, a mystical explanatory text for an Akitu festival of Ninurta taking place on the twenty fourth day of Iyar states that he resided in heaven. Wayne Horowitz notes that while it would be an unusual residence for Enlil's father, this passage might parallel the reference to Dumuzi and Ningishzida residing in heaven rather than as usually assumed in the underworld during their annual temporary death, known from the myth of Adapa.

=== Enlil's parentage in other traditions ===
While Enlil is commonly referred to as the father of other deities in known literature, his own parentage is only rarely discussed in primary sources. The view that his ancestors were the so-called Enki-Ninki deities is now considered to be conventional, though materials pertaining to it are difficult to interpret. In another tradition, his father was the sky god Anu. A recently published myth describing the birth of Enlil, only known from a single copy (MS 3312) and compared to Old Babylonian incantations, keeps his parents nameless, though according to Jeremiah Peterson it is possible that it belongs to the Enki-Ninki tradition. Enki and Ninki are the first generation of Enlil's ancestors in god lists, incantations, and other texts, and they are usually followed by a varying number of pairs of deities whose names start with "En" and "Nin". They are mentioned in the Sumerian composition "Death of Gilgamesh," where the eponymous hero encounters these divine ancestors in the underworld. The oldest document preserving this tradition is the Fara god list (Early Dynastic period). Sometimes all the ancestors were collectively called "the Enkis and the Ninkis." Enki, the ancestor of Enlil, is not to be confused with the god Enki (Ea). The ancestral Enki's name means "lord earth" while the meaning of the name of the god of Eridu is uncertain but not the same, as indicated by some writings including an amissable g.

== Identification with other deities ==
A deity named Nunu is equated with Lugaldukuga in a list of "defeated" gods. A different similar text instead equates him with ^{d}UB-nu in the corresponding line. Antoine Cavigneaux and Manfred Krebernik propose the reading Árna ("fault," "penalty") for this name, though Wilfred G. Lambert simply referred to this figure as Ubnu. It is uncertain if the Nunu equated with Lugaldukuga should be identified with the name element nu-nu, written both with divine determinative (dingir) and without. The latter is attested for the first time in the texts from Ebla from the third millennium BCE in name of a member of the royal family of Kish, without a dingir sign preceding it. It is well attested in personal names with Mari, always with the dingir preceding it. It has been proposed that in the latter case ^{d}nu-nu should be read as An-nu-nu, and that as such it might correspond to Annu, the name of a deity according to Icihro Nakata related to Annunitum, though this proposal is not universally accepted.

A different theological text equates Lugaldukuga with Enmesharra. An equation between him and Alala is also attested.

Wilfred G. Lambert noted that in a single source, Lugaldukuga appears as the husband of Nindukuga, which could indicate that he was understood as one and the same as Endukuga, one of the Enki-Ninki deities. Endukuga and Nindukuga occur as the last generation before Enlil and his wife Ninlil in one of the enumerations of them. At least two sources attest that Endukuga could be regarded as an inhabitant of the underworld.

=== Lugaldukuga as an epithet ===
The Iqqur-ipuš commentary identifies Lugaldukuga as a name of Ea. Andrew R. George argues that Marduk's name Dumudukuga, known from the Enūma Eliš, should be understood as a reference to this tradition. According to Wilfred G. Lambert, it is unlikely that Lugaldukuga understood as an ancestral deity and the title of Ea were understood as one and the same, as Ea is not attested as Enlil's father.

== Worship ==
A year name of king Ur-Ninurta of Isin mentions that he fashioned a golden armchair for a deity whose name has been tentatively restored as either Lugaldukuga or Endukuga. A šangûm priest of Lugaldukuga bearing the name Rīm-Adad ("gift of Adad") is mentioned in a document from Old Babylonian Nippur. A blessing formula from a letter from the same period invokes Lugaldukuga alongside Shamash.

A Middle Assyrian text called the Offering Bread Hemerology in modern scholarship states that offerings were made to Lugaldukuga, Enki (the cosmogonic deity), Enmesharra and the West Wind on the twenty ninth of Tašritu, the seventh month in the standard Mesopotamian calendar. Similarly, another Assyrian text, referred to as Astrolabe B, states that during the same month, funerary offerings were made both to Lugaldukuga and the Enki-Ninki deities. It also labels it as "the month of the grandfather of Enlil." The historical context of the latter text remains poorly understood, but Julia Krul notes that the associated rituals were seemingly connected to the Akitu festival. According to Wilfred G. Lambert, the time of the rites of Lugaldukuga might be based by the fact that the Sumerian name of the same month was Duku or Dukug. Sacrifices to the Duku itself taking place in Tašritu are also attested from both the third and the second millennium BCE. One source instead mentions a mourning ritual of Lugaldukuga taking place in the month Du'uzu alongside that dedicated to Dumuzi and a mourning festival of Enmesharra, which took place in Ṭebētu.

A seat of Lugaldukuga, the Edukuga, was located in the chariot house of the Esagil temple complex in Babylon. It should not be confused with an identically named sanctuary of Zababa in Kish, known from a topographical text. Lugaldukuga is also mentioned in relation to Esagil in another text, though as pointed by Andrew R. George in that case the epithet of Ea is meant. He proposes that the aforementioned cultic seat also belonged to Ea rather than to the ancestor of Enlil. At the same time, he notes that its location appears to parallel the location of a shrine of Enmesharra in the chariot house of Enlil known from a commentary on a royal ritual.

== Mythology ==
According to Wilfred G. Lambert, the god whose brother Enmesharra implicitly is according to the text Enlil and Namzitara, which refers to him as Enlil's paternal uncle, might be Lugaldukuga.

Lugaldukuga also appears in the myth The Toil of Babylon. It is possible that his epithet in this composition is Enšar, "lord of all." In the surviving fragments, another deity whose name starts with the cuneiform sign en, most likely Enlil, is happy about something and shares this information with Lugaldukuga, who is dissatisfied. However, apparently other gods share the first speaker's sentiment, which prompts Lugaldukuga to go down to the Apsu. There another deity spies on him. The rest of the narrative is difficult to interpret, but might involve an account of a flood similar to Atrahasis. Wilfred G. Lambert noted that while it is not impossible to assume Lugaldukuga should be understood as a title of Ea in this myth, his portrayal as a hated figure would be "just the opposite of his usual attribute" as a deity "envisioned as active, never discredited or hated, and an ever present source of help."

The name Endukuga is applied to the fifth of the gatekeepers of the underworld in the Sultantepe version of the myth Nergal and Ereshkigal.
