= Ehursag =

Sumerian term

Eḫursag (Sumerian: 𒂍𒄯𒊕) is a Sumerian term meaning "house of the mountains".

Sumerian ÉḪURSAG is written as a special ligature (ÉPAxGÍN 𒂍𒉺𒂅), sometimes etymologized as É.ḪAR.SAG (𒂍𒄯𒊕), written with the signs É "temple" (or "house"), ḪAR "mountain" and SAG "head".

Ehursag is commonly associated with a temple of Enlil discovered by Sir. Charles Leonard Woolley during excavations at Ur in modern-day Iraq. He originally considered this to be a palace, a view that was later rejected in replace for a temple. The location of the royal palace at Ur remains unknown. No graves were discovered under the Ekursag during these excavations. Woolley eventually conceded that it was a "minor temple of some sort." Modern scholars still vary on their interpretations of it as a temple, palace, or administrative building. It has even been suggested to be a wing or annex of the main temple, having had some of its foundations destroyed. Stamped bricks used in the construction of the foundations revealed that they were built by Ur-Nammu of the Third Dynasty of Ur. Bricks from the pavement bore the stamp of his successor, Shulgi and later ones of the Isin-Larsa period after Ur was destroyed by Elamites. Ehursag is also the name or epithet of Ninhursag's temple at Hiza and has been suggested to have been an interchangeable word with Enamtila. The Ehursag at Ur was restored in 1961 using ancient and modern bricks, a 2008 report for the British Museum noted that this had collapsed in some areas, especially the northwest corner.

== See also ==
- Ziggurat of Ur
- Ur
- Ekur
- Enamtila
- Hursag
- Hubur
