= Irḫan =

Mesopotamian god and historical name of a river

- Deified western branch of the Euphrates
- Major cult center: Ur
- Animals: snake

Irḫan was a Mesopotamian god who personified the western branch of the Euphrates, which in the first millennium BCE became its main course. The name could also refer to the river itself. The worship of Irḫan is sparsely attested, and many aspects of his character as a deity are uncertain. Two topics which continue to be a subject of debate among experts are his association or confusion with the snake god Nirah, and his proposed cosmogonic role.

== Name ==
Irḫan was the Sumerian name of the western branch of the Euphrates. In Akkadian it was called Araḫtu. These names are cognates, and most likely both were derived from the Semitic root 'rḫ, "to go on route." Araḫtu grew in importance in the first millennium BCE, because the eastern branch flowing through cities such as Kish and Nippur, which was formerly the main course, became difficult to navigate. As a result, the name Araḫtu started to be used interchangeably with Purattu.

The name could be written both syllabically (ir-ḫa-an) and logographically (ÍD.^{d}MUŠ.DIN.TIR.BALAG). Mixed writings, such as ^{d}MUŠ.ir-ḫa.DIN.BALAG, are also attested. It could also simply be represented by the logogram ^{d}MUŠ. However, it could also designate Ištaran, his messenger Nirah, the underworld god Ninazu, the tutelary god of Susa, Inshushinak, and the tutelary god of Eshnunna, Tishpak.

== Character ==
Irḫan, when understood as a deity, was a deification of the river sharing his name. Snake-like characteristics were most likely ascribed to him, presumably in reference to the many meanders of the river he represented.

While Irḫan was usually referred to as a male deity, sporadic references attributing this name to a female figure are also known.

An unresolved problem in scholarship is whether Irḫan should be understood as a cosmogonic deity. Frans Wiggermann argues that the available evidence does not support this theory, with a possible exception being the pairing of Irḫan with Dur, a deity analogous to the cosmogonic mound, Duku, in an offering list from Ur. He points out that the god list An = Anum makes Irḫan a son of Lisin, which would not be a suitable ancestry for a cosmogonic deity. However, Wilfred G. Lambert argued that he should be understood as such. He interpreted the Kassite period personal name MUŠ-šar-ilāni, "MUŠ is the king of the gods". as referring to Irḫan as a theogonic figure. Analogous names invoking other deities, including both traditional pantheon heads and other gods, are also known.

== Associations with other deities ==
Irḫan was at times confused with Nirah, the messenger of Ištaran. The early history of these two deities is not fully understood. It has been proposed that their names were cognate with each other, though the view that they shared the same origin is not universally accepted. Wilfred G. Lambert assumed that Irḫan and Nirah were fully interchangeable, and related not only theophoric names with the element ^{d}MUŠ, but also the snakes depicted on kudurru (boundary stones) to him. The latter are typically identified as Nirah instead. In some cases it is uncertain if ^{d}MUŠ should be read as Nirah or Irḫan, for example Paul-Alain Beaulieu is uncertain if the deity invoked in a single theophoric name from Achaemenid Ur, represented by the logographic writing ^{d}MUŠ, should be understood as Irḫan or Nirah. He tentatively transcribes the name in mention as Niraḫ-dān, "Nirah is powerful." It is also uncertain if the fourth king of the dynasty of Akshak known from the Sumerian King List should be read as Puzur-Nirah or Puzur-Irḫan.

A prayer to Nisaba known from Kalhu refers to Irḫan (^{d}MUŠ) as father of this goddess as well as the "gods of the universe." It also identifies him with Ea. According to Wilfred G. Lambert, this specific genealogy appears to reflect "a desire not to have Anu as Nisaba's father." Her parentage is not consistent in other sources.

One of the Early Dynastic Zame Hymns compares the incantation goddess Ningirima to Irḫan, presumably based on their shared connection with snakes and water. However, it has also been proposed that the mention of Irḫan instead indicates that Murum, Ningirima's cult center, was located on the waterway he corresponded to.

In the zi-pad_{3} litanies, Irḫan sometimes appears alongside Ninkasi, Ezina(/Ašnan) and Šakkan.

== Worship ==
Irḫan is attested in theophoric names from Early Dynastic and Ur III period Ur. During the latter period, he was worshiped in this city during an annual festival of sowing. A temple dedicated to him is not directly attested, but based on the reference to a priest calling himself "the doorman of Irḫan" its existence is considered to be a possibility. A gudu priest of Irḫan is also attested. There is no direct evidence that he was ever actively worshiped outside Ur, though he is present in a text from Nippur in an unclear context. Additionally, a cylinder of Gudea invokes "pure Irḫan of the Abzu."

Irḫan's cult apparently largely disappeared after the Ur III period. Only a single reference to Irḫan is presently known from the Old Babylonian literary corpus. He appears in a small fragment of a myth in which he apparently drinks beer during a divine banquet. According to Frans Wiggermann, a shrine dedicated to him also existed in the Ešarra temple complex in Assur.

A medical incantation prescribes drawing a picture of Irḫan with flour in order to cure rheumatism.
