= Hurrian primeval deities =

Group of Hurrian deities

Ammatina enna
- Primeval deities in Hurrian mythology
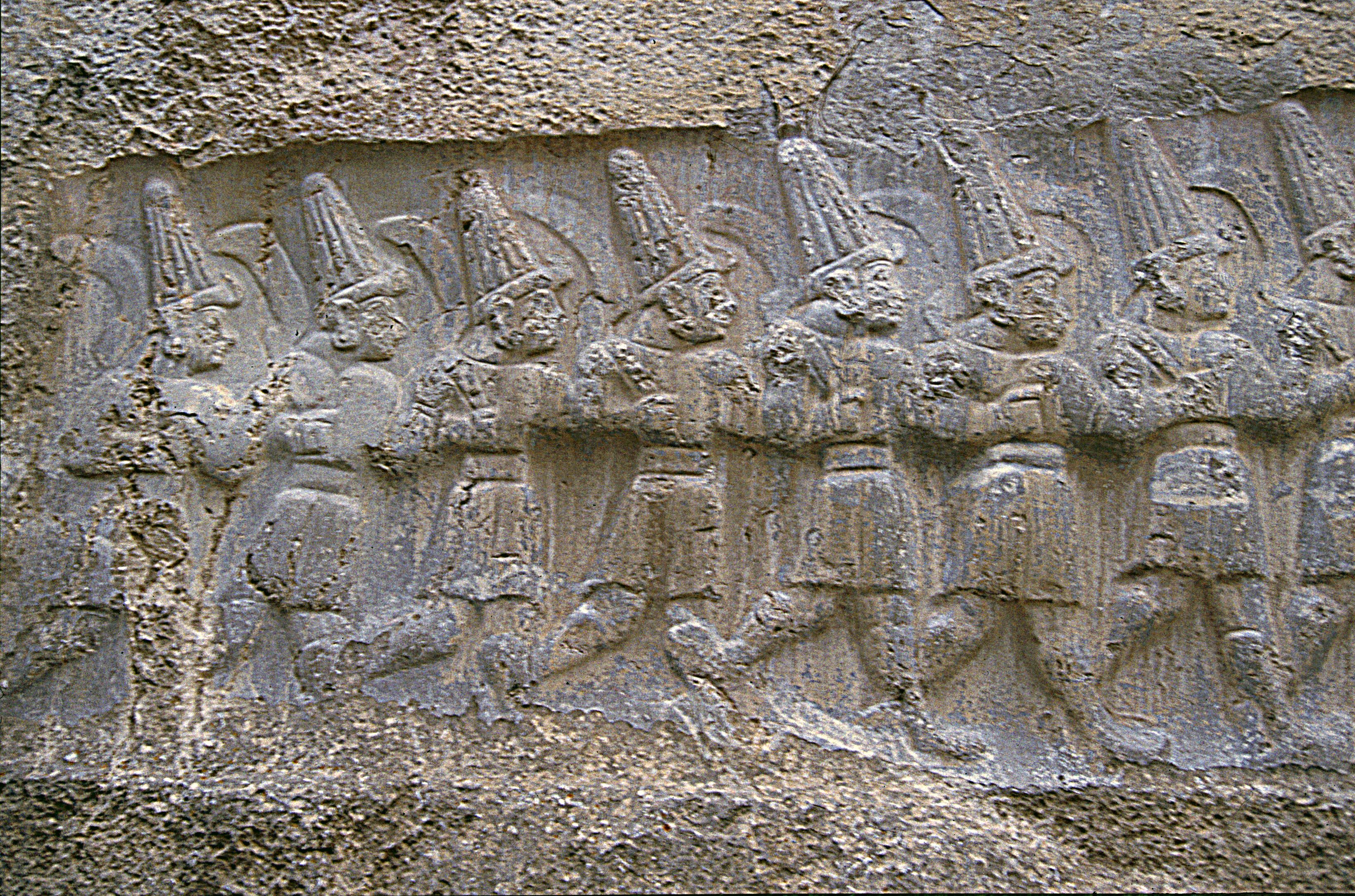
- Part of a relief from Yazılıkaya depicting primordial gods.
- Other names: Enna turenna, karuilieš šiuneš, kattereš šiuneš, taknaš šiuneš

Equivalents
- Mesopotamian: Ancestors of Enlil
- Ugaritic: Ilib

Hurrian primeval deities were regarded as an early generation of gods in Hurrian mythology. A variety of Hurrian, Hittite and Akkadian labels could be used to refer to them. They were believed to inhabit the underworld, where they were seemingly confined by Teshub. Individual texts contain a variety of different listings of primeval deities, with as many as thirty names known, though many are very sparasely attested. Some among them were received from Mesopotamia, but others might have names originating in Hurrian or a linguistic substrate. No specific cult centers of the primeval deities have been identified, and they were not worshiped by all Hurrian communities. They were also incorporated into Hittite religion, presumably either from Kizzuwatna or Syria. Offers were made to them in sacrificial pits, examples of which have been identified in Urkesh and Hattusa. The primeval deities also appear in a number of Hurrian myths, including multiple sections of the Kumarbi Cycle and the Song of Release.

== Terminology ==
In Hittitology and Assyriology, Hurrian primordial deities are variously referred to as “primeval deities”, “primeval gods”, “former gods” or “ancient gods”. In Hurrian they were described as enna turenna (“lower gods”) or ammatina enna (“divine ancestors”, literally “divine grandfathers”). Andrea Trameri proposes that the term enna turenna had a broader meaning, and that it referred to all underworld deities, including a more specific group designated as ammatina enna.

In Hittite, the same group was called karuilieš šiuneš, “primeval gods” or kattereš šiuneš, “lower gods”. (Note: Alfonso Archi stresses the need to separate it from the label kattereš karuileš, used in Hittite sources to refer collectively to Išduštaya and Papaya.) Both terms were calques from Hurrian. They could also be called taknaš šiuneš, “gods of the underworld” or “gods of the earth”. A logographic (“Akkadographic”) writing, A-NUN-NA-KE_{4}, is also attested. This term initially referred to major deities belonging to the Mesopotamian pantheon, but in later times in Akkadian texts it came to function as a label designating underworld deities. Furthermore, the Hurrian group of primeval deities could be described with the Akkadian phrase ilū ša dārâti, “gods of eternity”.

== Character ==
The primeval deities were regarded as members of early generations of gods which predated the rise of the head of the Hurrian pantheon, Teshub, to the rank of king of the gods. According to Alfonso Archi, Hurrians received the idea of multiple successive generations of deities from Mesopotamia. The primeval deities could be described as divine ancestors of other figures. They were believed to dwell in the underworld, which the Hurrians referred to as the “dark earth”, timri eže. This term might also have been loaned into Hittite as dankuiš daganzipaš. Based on a passage from a purification ritual (KBo 10.45 + ABoT 2.30), it was believed that they were driven there by Teshub, who subsequently made birds the standard offering for them in place of cattle and sheep. Presumably they came to live there aftermath of a confrontation which took place either during Teshub's quest for kingship among the gods or shortly after he was enthroned, mythical events which were believed to have taken place in the distant past, early on in the history of the world. As underworld deities, they were responsible for purification, and were meant to draw impurity and adversity to their realm. However, in the case of Mesopotamian deities who came to be incorporated into the Hurrian group, the association with the underworld was of secondary importance. Their inclusion in the group might have reflected their perception in areas on the periphery of the sphere of Mesopotamian cultural influence, where they plausibly could have been viewed as primordial figures.

Primordial deities were associated with Kumarbi, a high ranking Hurrian god. They appear as his allies in myths. They could also be linked with Allani, a goddess regarded as the queen of the underworld. In Hittite sources, they might instead appear alongside the Sun goddess of the Earth, who was identified with her. In the Hurrian ritual text KBo 17.94, the primeval deities are associated with Išḫara. Presumably the connection reflects this goddess’ own ties to the underworld and the deceased. Alfonso Archi notes that the shared association with the primeval deities and with the underworld might have in turn influenced the well attested connection between Išḫara and Allani.

== Lists of primeval deities ==
Hurro-Hittite ritual texts did not establish a single canonical list of primeval deities. Their number in individual sources varies, with groupings of five, seven, eight, ten, twelve, and fifteen all attested. Of these, seven and twelve are the most recurring numbers. The latter represented completeness. A total of around thirty names of individual primeval deities are known, but the precise identity of many of them remains opaque. Most frequently listed sequence consists of Nara, Namšara, Minki, Ammunki, Ammizzadu, Tuḫuši, Alalu, Anu, Antu, Apantu, Enlil and Ninlil. The names of many of the primeval deities were arranged in texts in rhyming pairs, according to Piotr Taracha for magical reasons. Triads are also attested.

Gernot Wilhelm argues that the fact the group was referred to ammatina enna, “divine grandfathers”, indicates that the seven best attested deities belonging to this category (Nara, Namšara, Minki, Ammunki, Ammizzadu, Tuḫuši, Alalu) were all male. This assumption is also accepted by Amir Gilan. He additionally notes that the twelve primeval deities depicted in Yazılıkaya are male too, but also that in addition to the group of seven possibly male gods, female members of the group are attested in textual sources. Examples include Apantu and Zulki.

Piotr Taracha interprets the lists of primeval deities attested in various texts as combinations of figures received from Mesopotamia and from a “local substrate”. He also states that some of their names are Hurrian. According to Gernot Wilhelm, many of the names which do not have Mesopotamian origin cannot be explained in any language, and might have originated in modern Syria. He also notes that the absence of the primeval deities from Mitanni sources makes it implausible that the group originated in Upper Mesopotamia, as sometimes suggested. Volkert Haas argues that their names were received by the Hurrians from a non-Semitic substrate language, with Mesopotamian deities added to the group later on. Alfonso Archi instead argues some of the names represent corrupted forms of Mesopotamian theonyms, possibly reflecting early transfer.

=== Attested individual names ===
Name	Origin	Details
Ābi	Hurrian	Ābi, “pit”, could be invoked among the primeval deities, as attested in the ritual CTH 446. According to Alfonso Archi, the name should be understood as a reference to a deified sacrificial pit used to summon the deities from the underworld. This figure might have been regarded as a personified deity, but played no role outside of rituals. Billie Jean Collis argues that the deification was only meant to reflect the supernatural properties inscribed to the structure.
Aduntarri Aduntera	Syrian	Aduntarri was regarded as a divine seer (^{lú}ḪAL). The title indicates he was regarded as a male deity. He formed a triad with Irpitiga and Zulki in rituals. The suffix -tera is present in a number of theonyms presumed to originate in Syria, and on this basis it has been argued that he might have originally been a deity of a West Semitic speaking group from this area.
Alalu	Mesopotamian	Alalu was regarded as the first “king in heaven” who was dethroned by Anu and had to flee to the “dark earth”. Wilfred G. Lambert suggested that this episode might have been derived from a presently unknown Mesopotamian myth. In some cases, Alalu appears in a sequence with Kumarbi, which might reflect the belief that they were regarded as father and son.
Amizzadu Amaza	Mesopotamian or Syrian	According to Alfonso Archi, Amizadu's name ends in a Semitic feminine suffix, though it has also been argued that it is masculine. The similarity to the name of a Babylonian king, Ammizaduga, is accidental. She often appears alongside Alalu. Under the name Amaza, she was also worshiped in Emar in association with him, possibly as an underworld deity. It has been proposed that she was regarded as analogous to the Mesopotamian goddess Belili.
Antu	Mesopotamian	Antu was in origin the spouse of the Mesopotamian god Anu. In some cases in treaties a triad consisting of them both and Apantu appears.
Anu	Mesopotamian	Anu was the Mesopotamian god of heaven. In contrast with other members of the group, he was not believed to dwell in the underworld, and his connection to them relied entirely on his character as a primordial deity.
Apantu	Mesopotamian	Apantu's character is not well known and she has been described as “colorless” by Alfonso Archi. She formed a pair with Antu in rituals. Gernot Wilhelm considers her to be a deity of Mesopotamian origin. According to Archi her name was created “in assonance with Antu”, and appears to end in a Semitic feminine suffix.
Eltara	Ugaritic	While it has been suggested in early scholarship that Eltara is a corrupted form of Latarak, today it is assumed it is a combination of the name of the Ugaritic god El and the element -tara. Said suffix might be the same one present in the name of Aduntarri (Aduntera). A myth in which Eltara apparently acts as the king of the gods is known. He also appears in a ritual text, KUB 45.28, though he did not play a large role in the sphere of worship. He is also absent from treaties.
Enlil	Mesopotamian	Enlil was originally a Mesopotamian god regarded as the head of the pantheon. While well attested in treaties, he only appears as one of the primeval deities in a ritual text once, alongside Apantu.
Irpitiga	Hurrian	Irpitiga was a male deity addressed as the “lord of judgment”. While it has been argued that he was also known as the “lord of earth”, this might be a misunderstanding of a logographic writing of the former title.
Kumarbi	Hurrian	Kumarbi was one of the main Hurrian deities. In some treaties, he was counted among the primeval deities as one of the three old “kings in heaven”. He takes Apantu's usual place in such cases.
Minki and Amunki	Mesopotamian	Minki (Munki) and Amunki formed a pair. It has been argued that they were both derived from the Mesopotamian pair Enki and Ninki, the first generation of ancestors of Enlil. (Note: This deity is not to be confused with the better known god associated with water also named Enki.) Wilfred G. Lambert noted that their names might be phonetic variants of Enki and Ninki otherwise not preserved in writing. However, it remains unknown if Amunki and Minki were similarly a male-female pair, or instead two deities of the same gender.
Muntara and Mutmuntara	possibly West Semitic	Muntara and Mutmuntara formed a pair, though both of them are also attested separately from each other. They appear only in rituals. Their name might contain the same suffix as these of Adunterri, Eltara and Mutmuntara, and as such might have West Semitic origin. One of the two might have been male and the other female according to Volkert Haas.
Namšara Napšara	possibly Mesopotamian	According to Alfonso Archi, the name Namšara might be a corrupt form of the Mesopotamian theonym Enmešarra, one of the ancestors of Enlil. An earlier proposal was that the name is a corruption of Namtar.
Nara	possibly Mesopotamian	Nara formed a pair with Namšara in rituals. In Hittite treaties, they are the first of the pairs of primordial deities listed. It has been suggested that this theonym was a derivative or corrupted form of Narru, an epithet of Enlil, but this remains uncertain. In Malitta, Nara was worshiped in the form of a wooden statue of a bull.
Ninlil	Mesopotamian	Ninlil, who formed a pair with Enlil, was a Mesopotamian goddess in origin. She does not appear in ritual texts.
Taštara Taištara		Taštara formed a pair with Eltara in rituals. According to Volkert Haas, it is possible one of these two deities was male and the other female.
Tuḫuši	Unknown	Tuḫuši formed a triad with Minki and Amunki.
Zulki		Zulki was regarded as a divine seer, specifically as a dream interpreter (^{MUNUS}ENSI). The title indicates she was a female deity.

In addition to the deities listed above, less well attested Hurrian primeval deities include Alammu, Elluita, Napirra, Undurupa and the pairs Ašša and Apašta and Aunammudu and Iyandu. Furthermore, in a single Hittite treaty a deity designated by the Sumerogram NIN.É.GAL appears among them. Additionally, anonymous divine ancestors of multiple Hurrian deities, including Teshub, Ḫepat, Šauška, Šimige, Ningal and Lelluri, are mentioned in ritual texts from Kizzuwatna. In two cases, those of Šauška and Šimige, all of the ancestors are stated to be of the same gender, respectively female and male.

== Worship ==
It is presumed that the worship of primeval deities was a part of the traditions of Hurrians living in Syria and Kizzuwatna, but it is not attested in Mitanni sources. Alfonso Archi on this basis concluded they cannot be considered pan-Hurrian deities. Ritual texts do not associate them with a specific cult center.

Communication with the primeval deities required the preparation of special pits, typically located outdoors. One example of such a structure has been identified during excavations of Urkesh. It dates to 2300 BCE, measures five meters in diameter and might be seven meters deep, though between 1999 and 2004 the excavators only reached six meters deep into the ground. Its purpose was initially uncertain, with an early proposal being to identify it as an elaborate cist burial, but it has eventually been established based on the presence of numerous faunal remains and other objects identified as offerings. However, while later sources indicate that underworld deities received birds as offerings, the Urkesh pit instead contains the remains of piglets, puppies, sheep, goats and donkeys. The first two of these animals were not typical sacrifices, and based on evidence from later rituals it is assumed they were used as agents of purification.

=== Hittite reception ===
Hurrian primeval deities were incorporated into Hittite religion. Most likely they were received in the fourteenth century BCE from northern Syria or Kizzuwatna. Hittites were aware of the tradition of making offerings to them in pits, and possible examples of such structures have been identified during excavations in Hattusa. Multiple terms were used to refer to the offering pits in Hittite texts, including ḫateššar, pateššar, wappu, āpi and the Sumerogram ARÀḪ (“storage pit”). As a group, the primeval deities received offerings in rituals such as CTH 446, 447 and 449. However, they had no established cult, and ceremonies related to them were only carried out in reaction to specific events. One example is a ritual meant to help purify a house from blood, which had to last two days and involved the preparation of statues of the primeval deities from clay from a riverbank sprinkled with oil and honey and the offering of birds to them. The text KBo 23.7 describes an invocation of the group performed by a SANGA priest on Mount Irrāna, during which a “Song of the Invocation of the Primeval Deities” was sung.

The primeval deities also appear as divine witnesses in treaties. The oldest example, which does not yet use their individual names, is CTH 139, dated to the reign of Arnuwanda I, where they are listed separately from “the gods of the heaven and the gods of the earth”, a grouping which according to earlier Hattian-Hittite tradition already included underworld deities of local origin. The received Hurrian idea of underworld deities differed from the earlier Anatolian one, which did not present them as an earlier generation. When their individual names are listed in Hittite treaties, twelve of them are enumerated, with the exception of the treaty with Alaksandu, which lists only nine, namely Nara, Napšara, Amunki, Tuḫuši, Ammezzadu, Alalu, Kumarbi, Enlil and Ninlil.

It is assumed that a group of twelve gods from the Yazılıkaya sanctuary reliefs dressed in pointy caps and armed with curved swords can be interpreted as a depiction of the Hurrian primeval deities.

== Mythology ==
The primeval deities appear in multiple myths belonging to the so-called Kumarbi Cycle. In the Song of Emergence, also known as Song of Kumarbi or Kingship in Heaven, in the proem the narrator invites them to listen to the tale:

[I sing of Kumarbi, Father of the Gods.] The Primeval Deities, who [are in the Dark Earth(?)] – let [those] important [Primeval] Deities listen! Let Nara, [Napšara, Minki], and Ammunki listen! Let Ammezzadu [and ...], father and mother of [...], listen! Let [Enlil and Apandu], father and mother of Išḫara, listen! (Note: In his earlier treatment of the text, Harry Hoffner left the names of Išḫara’s parents unrestored.) Let Enlil [and Ninlil], who are weighty and eternal deities, [contented(?)] and quiet, listen!

It is commonly assumed that the invocation of this group reflected their character as members of an earlier generation of gods who witnessed the described events firsthand. According to Alfonso Archi, the list of primeval deities used in Hittite treaties shows overlap with this enumeration, and might be derived from it. Amir Gilan considers it to be a literary device, and concludes that it cannot be assumed that it corresponds to invoking them in a ritual setting.

In the Song of LAMMA, the primeval deities are mentioned during an argument between the eponymous figure and Kubaba which revolves around the former's unwillingness to honor them. In a later section, Ea decides to dispose of LAMMA, who was temporarily made the king of the gods, and announces his plan to Nara, addressing him as a brother and ordering him to gather various animals for an unknown purpose. According to Volkert Haas’ interpretation, in the Song of Ḫedammu the primeval deities are addressed alongside Kumarbi by Ea when he berates him in the divine assembly due to the danger his plots pose to mankind. In the Song of Ullikummi, Ea requests the primeval deities to bring him a tool which long ago was used to separate haven from earth, which he subsequently uses to separate Ullikummi from the shoulder of Upelluri.

In a fragment of a myth (KUB 33, 105: 10), Teshub states that he received wisdom from Nara. According to Amir Gilan, a poorly preserved passage in the Song of Emergence might also allude to this event.

The banishment of the primeval deities to the underworld is alluded to in the myth Ea and the Beast. This composition, which might be a part of the Kumarbi Cycle, describes a long prophetic speech given by suppalanza, a hitherto unidentified animal, to Ea, which seemingly describes the deeds of Teshub, including the banishment of unspecified opponents to the underworld, where they will be kept in place with strings. A further fragmentary myth sometimes classified as a part of the same cycle, KBo 22.87, describes a period during which one of the primeval deities, Eltara, was the king of the gods. Apparently it involves the other primordial deities being lifted up from the underworld to reside with him in heaven.

In an episode from the Song of Release the interpretation of which remains a matter of debate, the primordial deities sit with Teshub during a feast held for him in the underworld by Allani. Gernot Wilhelm suggests that the scene might be meant to mirror rituals for deceased kings who were believed to feast in the underworld with their ancestors.

A possible reference to the primeval deities occurs in the so-called ritual of Maštigga (CTH 404), which alludes to an eschatological event when “the former kings” (karuilieš LUGAL^{meš}), who Gary Beckman identifies as the same group rather than as deceased mortal rulers, “should return and examine the land and (its) custom(s)”.

== Influence on other deities ==
Karel van der Toorn compares the Hurrian primeval deities, especially Alalu, with the Ugaritic god Ilib, who according to him developed as a similar figure meant to represent a divine ancestor who was believed to have reigned over the gods in the distant past. Alfonso Archi notes that the Hurrians living in Ugarit in turn developed the figure of eni attanni, “god father”, a “generic ancestor of the gods” meant to mirror Ilib.

The confinement of the Hurrian primeval deities in the underworld has been compared to the fate of Titans in later Greek myths. It has been suggested this group was based on the Hurrian deities. The contact zone in which Greeks would be introduced to Hurro-Hittite tradition might have been Cilicia, Cyprus or the Levant, but it is not certain if they were received directly from the Hittites or another culture. However, it has been noted differences between the two groups of deities also exist. Most notably, Titans rarely, if ever, appear in rituals.
