= Enamtila =

Enamtila (Sumerian: 𒂍𒉆𒋾𒆷) is a Sumerian term meaning "house of life" or possibly "house of creation". It was a sanctuary dedicated to Enlil, likely to have been located within the Ekur at Nippur during the Akkadian Empire. It also referred to various other temples including those to later versions of Enlil; Marduk and Bel as well as one to Ea. It was likely another name for Ehursag, a temple dedicated to Shulgi in Ur. A hymn to Nanna suggests the link "To Ehursag, the house of the king (we go), to the Enamtila of prince Shulgi we go!" Another reference in the Inanna - Dunmuzi text translated by Samuel Noah Kramer references the king's palace by this name and possibly makes references to the "sacred marriage": "In the Enamtila, the house of the king, his wife dwelt with him in joy, in the Enamtila, the house of the king, Inanna dwelt with him in joy. Inanna, rejoicing in his house ...". A fire is reported to have broken out next to the Enamtila in a Babylonian astronomical diary dated to the third century BC. The Enamtila is also referred to as a palace of Ibbi-Sin at Ur in the Lament for Sumer and Ur, "Its king sat immobilised in his own palace. Ibbi-Suen was sitting in anguish in his own palace. In E-namtila, his place of delight, he wept bitterly. The flood dashing a hoe on the ground was levelling everything."

== See also ==
- Debate between Winter and Summer
- Ekur
- Hursag
- Hubur
