= Kūbu =

Mesopotamian supernatural beings

- Deified stillborn ghosts
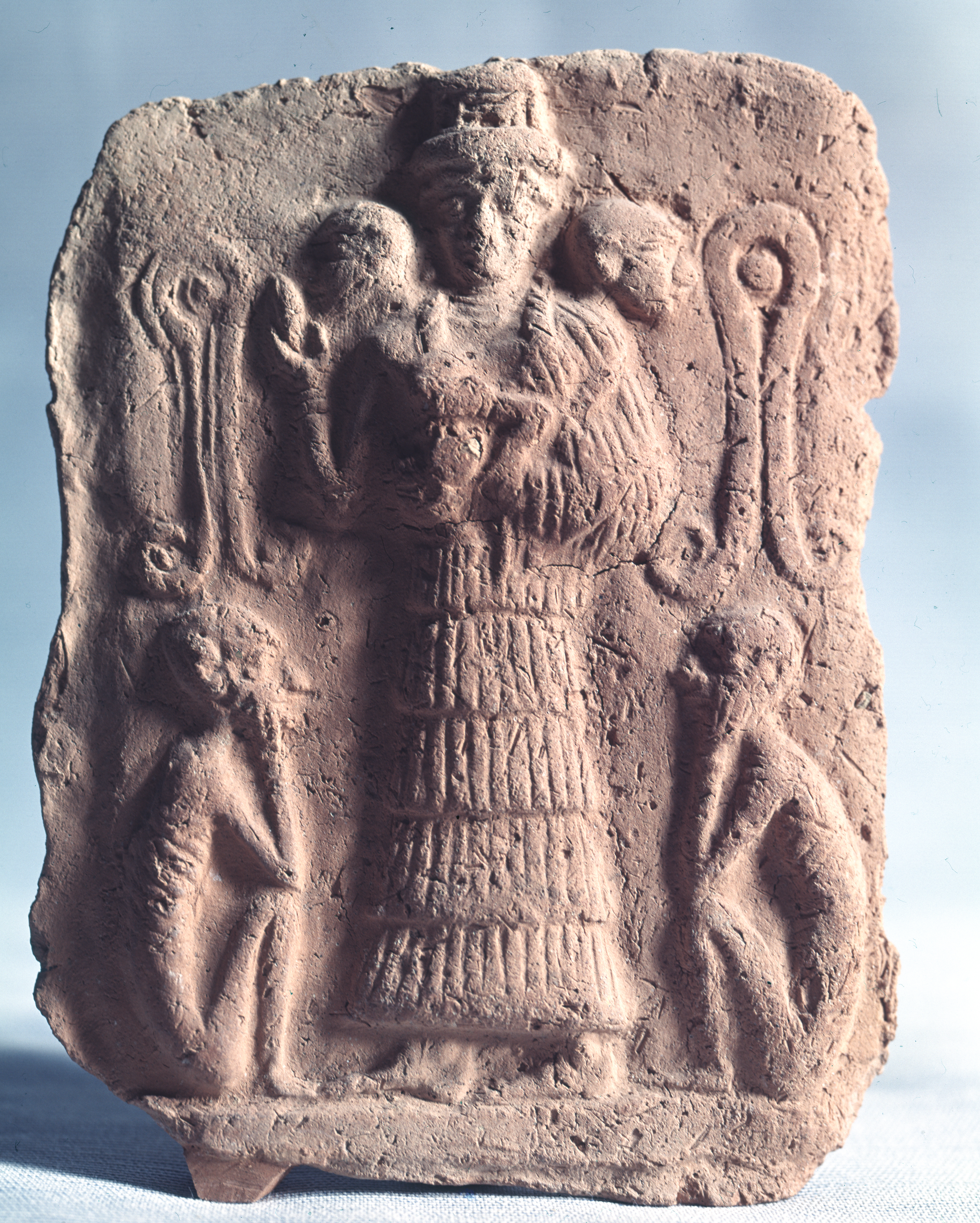
- An Old Babylonian plaque depicting a birth goddess (Note: As noted by Joan Goodnick Westenholz, while commonly used, the term "mother goddess" is inadequate in Mesopotamian context, as goddesses from this category were involved only in creation and birth of deities and humans, but not in their nurturing. Multiple goddesses associated with birth were recognized in Mesopotamian religion, including but not limited to Ninhursag, Aruru and Ninmena.) flanked by two emaciated figures who might be Kūbu. Louvre.
- Major cult center: Assur
- Abode: The underworld

Kūbu were a class of supernatural beings in ancient Mesopotamian religion. They were believed to be the ghosts of stillborn fetuses. They were believed to inhabit the underworld like eṭemmu, but were not regarded as identical with them. They were considered to be demonic beings capable of negatively influencing mortals. However, in contrast with other Mesopotamian demons were also an object of cult, possibly meant to placate them. They could be invoked in theophoric names. In Kish, a single Kūbu was worshiped as a member of the circle of the city god, Zababa, and might have been regarded as his child.

== Name and character ==
Multiple spellings of the term Kūbu are attested in cuneiform, including but not limited to ^{d}ku-bu, ^{d}ku-bu-um, ^{d}kù-bu and ^{d}kù-bu-um. The anglicized plural "Kūbus" is sometimes used in Assyriological publications. The term has Akkadian origin. Its Sumerian translation was nigar. It refers to a stillborn fetus. The frequent addition of the determinative dingir reflects the assignment of supernatural properties or outright deification. Kūbu can be understood as a class of ghosts or demons. Their semi-divine character might reflect the perception of stillborn fetuses as taboo, and thus simultaneously sacred and dangerous.

The lack of personal names was regarded as a distinct feature of Kūbu, differentiating them from the ghosts (eṭemmu) of adults. However, like them they were believed to inhabit the underworld. A tradition according to which they were among underworld beings controlled by Shamash is attested; in this context they are mentioned alongside Anunnaki and malku demons.

The influence of Kūbu on the living was generally considered to be negative. Some illnesses could be regarded as caused by their activity. An affliction referred to as the "hand of Kūbu" is attested.

== Iconography ==
It is known that Kūbu were depicted in Mesopotamian art, as references to images of them are present in rituals accompanying manufacture of bricks. It is possible that emaciated crouching figures who appear next to birth goddesses on Old Babylonian terracotta reliefs are representations of Kūbu. However, this identification is uncertain, and has been questioned by Wilfred G. Lambert.

== Worship ==
In contrast with most other figures who could be regarded as demonic, Kūbu were an object of active cult in Mesopotamia and received offerings. (Note: The Sebitti are another similar exception.) This was most likely intended as a way to placate them to prevent them from negatively influencing the living. However, according to Wilfred G. Lambert, active worship of Kūbu is documented only for the temple of Ashur in Assur in the Middle Assyrian and Late Assyrian periods. They received offerings in a location referred to as bīt Kūbi, "shrine of Kūbu".

An incantation against Lamashtu known from Nimrud and from a partial parallel from Ugarit conjures her by invoking the Kūbu of high priestesses (entu), nadītu women, Sargon and Naram-Sin. According to Walter Farber the invocation of Kūbu of priestesses and nadītu might reflect the belief that the stillborn offspring of women whose marriage and children were subject to special regulations possessed particular powers, but it is difficult to explain the reference to Kūbu of historical rulers.

A singular Kūbu is mentioned in a Late Babylonian ritual from Kish focused on Zababa and his entourage, which according to Frans A. M. Wiggermann might indicate in this context a stillborn divine child of this god and his wife Šarrat-Kiš was meant, rather than a ghost.

=== Theophoric names ===
Theophoric names invoking Kūbu are first attested in the Ur III period, and continued to appear in the second millennium BCE. For instance, fourteen have been identified in texts from Nippur from the Kassite period, which makes Kūbu the seventeenth most common deity in theophoric names from this text corpus. (Note: The number of names invoking the goddess Bau is equally high, while the five deities most commonly invoked are Sin (129), Adad (121), Marduk (110), Shamash (106) and Enlil (87).) However, no examples from any texts postdating the Middle Assyrian and Middle Babylonian periods.

It is possible that giving children names mentioning Kūbu was meant to symbolically integrate them into the family to pacify them. Réka Esztári notes that the custom of burying stillborn fetuses and dead infants in pots underneath the floor of a house, the standard place of burial, similarly reflects the need to integrate them into their family. Marten Stol instead proposes that the theophoric names reflected situations in which the safe birth of a child was attributed to the help of a Kūbu.

=== Outside Mesopotamia ===
Theophoric names invoking Kūbu are attested in texts from Susa in Elam, though according to Ran Zadok all of them are Akkadian, rather than Elamite. Additionally, in the Old Babylonian period Kūbu sometimes appear among Mesopotamian deities listed as witnesses in oath formulas from this city. Both of these phenomena most likely reflect a broader pattern of cultural influence of the eastern periphery of Mesopotamia, especially the Diyala area and the Sealand, on Susa, already documented before the Old Babylonian period.

An incantation involving Kūbu is known from a compendium of texts in Akkadian (KBo XXXVI 29) discovered in Hattusa, the capital of the Hittite Empire, but presumably originally composed in upper Mesopotamia between the fifteenth and fourteenth centuries. (Note: Elyze-Comer describes it as Assyro-Mittanian based on the ductus. According to Réka Esztári, the dating and place of original composition can be determined based on the presence of Hurrian loanwords and typically northern grammatical peculiarities.) It is the only known example of a text from this genre focused on Kūbū. Around one fourth of the lines are missing, including the introduction, making its purpose difficult to establish. However, it has been determined with certainty that the performer of the ritual, identified as an āšipu, is instructed to invoke the Kūbu, rather than ward them off. The construction of a house (bītu) for them, as well as providing them with food and drink, are mentioned. It is possible that the Kūbu were invoked to prevent a stillbirth in this context. Possibly a symbolic substitute for a child was offered to them by the āšipu while a woman was giving birth, so that they take it to the underworld instead of her child.

An amulet from Emar inscribed with an Akkadian incantation against Lamashtu mentions Kūbu among deities invoked to conjure her.

== Literary texts ==
In the Old Babylonian myth Gilgamesh, Enkidu, and the Netherworld Kūbu are mentioned under their Sumerian name among the inhabitants of the land of the dead observed by Enkidu. They are described playing at gold and silver tablets and consuming honey and ghee, presumably meant as a substitute for meals they could not receive due to being born dead. The passage is an exception from the pattern of presenting the position of different categories of the dead as dependent on their accomplishments in life; presumably the stillborn are granted a happy afterlife to compensate them for their inability to be born.

A Middle Babylonian composition focused on the god Panigarra, a son of Ninhursag and Šulpae, mentions his visit to shrines dedicated to Kūbū. This might depend on the meaning of his name ("elder of the nigar"), which refers to the Sumerian translation of Kūbu.
