= Tutu (Mesopotamian god) =

Minor mesopotamian god

Tutu (/ˈtu:tu:/, cuneiform: 𒌅𒌅, ^{d}TU.TU) is a god from ancient Mesopotamia and patron deity of Borsippa, a city near Babylon. He appears in the name of an ensi (governor) of the Area from the Ur III period, Puzur Tutu. The meaning and origin of his name are uncertain.

References to worship him are also known from Kish and Sippar, and he seemingly appears in theophoric names from Larsa, Babylon and Dilbat, though it is uncertain if every instance of a divine name written as DU-DU or tu-tu in personal names refers to the same deity. Tutu is still attested as a distinct deity in the role of the tutelary god of Borsippa during the reign of Hammurabi.

Prior to syncretism with Marduk, in Borsippa, it is presumed Tutu was worshipped at the Ezida temple. In the building inscriptions of Nebuchadnezzar II, Tutu is used as a source of legitimacy and ritual renewal. The inscriptions of Nebuchadnezzar invoke Tutu (though synonymized with Marduk and Nabu) to assert his right to rule, and mention "purifying", "beautifying", and "making splendid" the temple.

As evidenced by god lists, he was syncretized with Marduk in later periods, similar to Asalluhi, a god of exorcisms and son of Enki, the agricultural god Enbilulu, as well as an otherwise unknown deity named Šazu. In Enuma Elish, Tutu is one of the names bestowed upon Marduk, seemingly one connected with Babylon's role as a center of refurbishing and ritually reviving damaged divine statues. Tutu, additionally, was connected to Jupiter, and possibly Mercury, due to association with Marduk and Nabu, respectively. Tutu is also explained as a name of Marduk in an incantation from the Muššu'u series. A reference to Tutu, treated as a name of Marduk, can also be found in the so-called Bird Call Text:

The cock is the bird of Enmešarra. Its cry is, "You sinned against Tutu."

According to Wilfred G. Lambert, the use of Tutu as a name of Marduk ceased in the first millennium BCE, when it started to be used to refer to Nabu instead. However, according to Francesco Pomponio, only a single neo-Assyrian text identifies Tutu as Nabu. Nabu nonetheless started to be regarded as the tutelary god of Borsippa in the first millennium BCE.

== Bibliography ==
- Lambert, Wilfred G. (2013). Babylonian creation myths. Winona Lake, Indiana: Eisenbrauns. ISBN 978-1-57506-861-9. OCLC 861537250.
- Pomponio, Francesco (1998), "Nabû A. Philological", Reallexikon der Assyriologie
- Richter, Thomas (2014), "Tutu", Reallexikon der Assyriologie
- George, A. R. (1997), "Marduk and the cult of the gods of Nippur at Babylon.", Orientalia, vol. 66, no. 1, Peeters Publishers, p. 68
- "Nebuchadnezzar II Q005473", Royal Inscriptions of the Neo-Babylonian Empire, 2025
