= Qurdi-Nergal =

Huzirina (modern Tel Sultantepe)
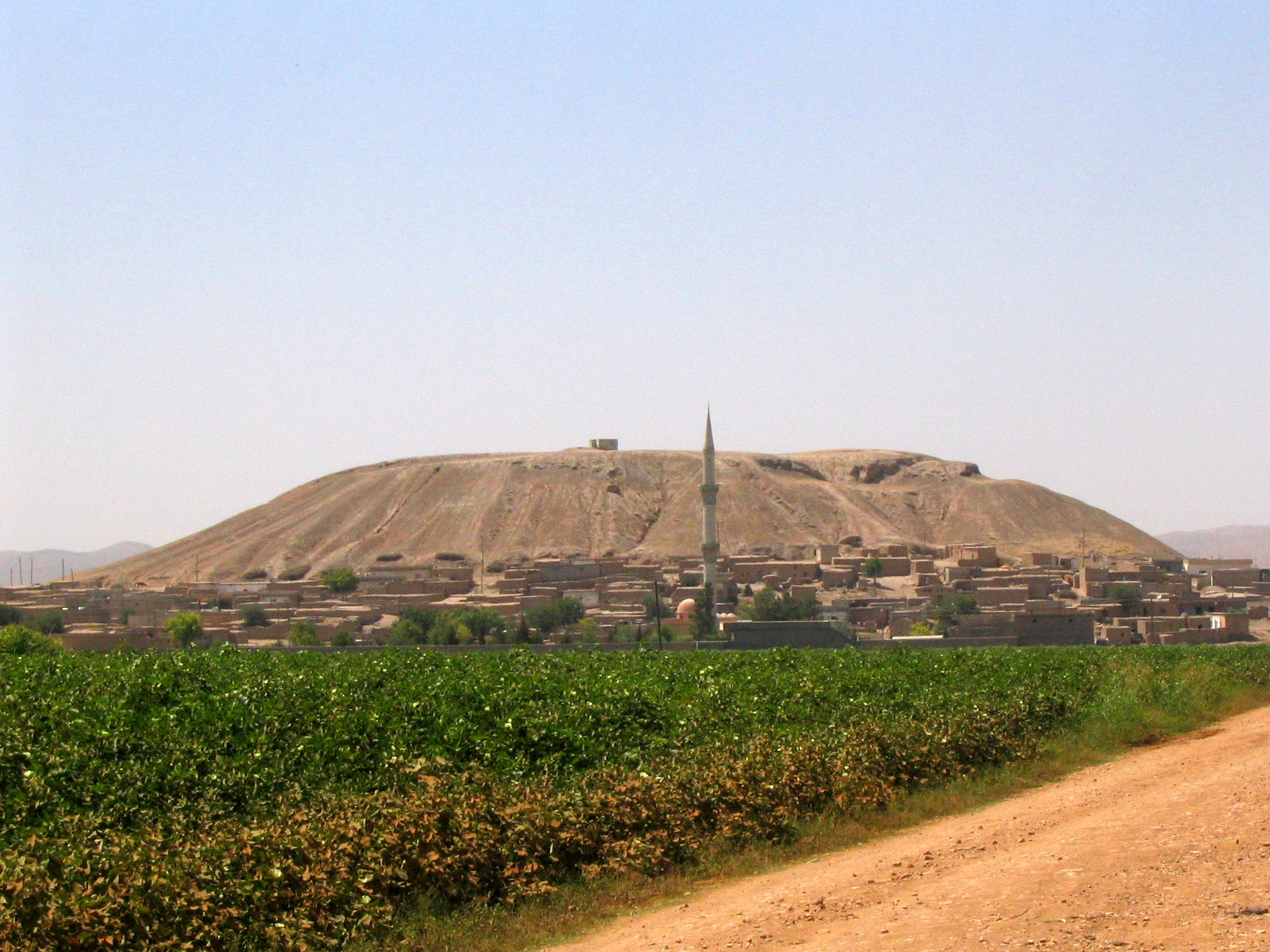
- The supposed house of Qurdi-Nergal was found near here at Tel Sultantepe.

Qurdi-Nergal, also spelled Kurdi-Nergal, was a priest of the god Zababa of the cities of Erbil, Harran and Huzirina. He had a home and library at Huzirina, modern Tel Sultantepe, in Southern Turkey. He is famous for owning an extensive library where incantations, medical texts, prayers, epics, and wisdom literature were found. He began his career in about 701 BC as a junior apprentice scribe but eventually became chief temple administrator of the god Zababa. British excavators discovered 400 scholarly tablets and fragments in 1951, outside what they assume is his house, that were written or owned by Qurdi-Nergal and his descendants. They were protected by wine jars and were lying in a pile against the house's outside wall. The most recent date on the tablets was 619 BC, which was just a few years before the Assyrian empire collapsed and the nearby city of Harran was destroyed (610 BC).

Some scholars believe that the Huzirina tablets are the remains of a scribal school run by Qurdi-Nergal and his descendants. According to the tablets found, other scribes such as Nabu-ah-iddin, his pupil Nabu-rehtu-usur, Sum-tabni-usur, Mutaqqin-Assur, Nabu-sumu-iskun, and at least another 15 junior apprentice scribe wrote or copied texts along with Qurdi-Nergal. The tablets were produced by copying or dictation. This scribal school may have been funded by provincial officials and gives insights into the culture of the time. Most likely young teens worked as scribes hoping to eventually work in the royal court and had aspirations to work their way up in the ranks of imperial governance. The archaeological finds were probably quickly buried before the Medes and Babylonians destroyed Harran and its surrounding cities. Qurdi-Nergal had at least one son, Mushallim-Baba, and one great-grandson Ninurta, who lived in 619 BC.
