= Zababa =

Mesopotamian war god

- God of war
- Major cult center: Kish
- Animals: eagle

Genealogy
- Parents: Enlil or Ashur (father)
- Spouse: Bau

Equivalents
- Hurrian: Ḫešui, Aštabi
- Hittite: Wurunkatte, Šulinkatte

Zababa (𒀭𒍝𒂷𒂷, ^{d}za-ba_{4}-ba_{4}, /ˈzɑːbɑːbɑː/) was a Mesopotamian god. He was the tutelary deity of the city of Kish and was regarded as a god of war. He was initially seen as a son of Enlil, though in Assyria during the reign of Sennacherib, he started to be viewed as a son of Ashur instead. The goddess Bau came to be viewed as his wife after her introduction to Kish in the Old Babylonian period.

The worship of Zababa is first documented in sources from the Early Dynastic period, including texts from both Kish and other cities in Mesopotamia, for example the Zame Hymns from Abu Salabikh. His importance declined in the Sargonic and Ur III period, but he regained a more prominent position in the Old Babylonian period. Through the first millennium BCE he was worshiped both in Babylonia and in Assyria.

No myths focused on Zababa are known, though he is referenced in an UD.GAL.NUN composition about the construction of Enlil's temple, in a number of legends about rulers of the Akkadian Empire, and in texts known from late copies such as Urash and Marduk and Enmesharra's Defeat.

== Name ==
Zababa's name was written in cuneiform as ^{d}za-ba_{4}-ba_{4}. In Early Dynastic sources the spelling ^{d}za_{7}-ba_{4}-ba_{4} also occurs, though it is agreed za_{7} was only an early form of the sign za. According to Gonzalo Rubio, the name has no plausible Sumerian or Semitic etymologies, and can be compared with other structurally similar theonyms such as Alala or Bunene. Piotr Steinkeller assumes he was originally worshiped by Akkadians, but states his name cannot be necessarily classified as originating in Akkadian or another Semitic language. However, such an origin has been proposed as a possibility by Gebhard J. Selz, though without a specific etymology.

Explanatory texts could provide Zababa's name with artificial Akkadian etymologies likely based on homophony, alternate readings of signs or literary allusions, such as "crusher of stones" (dā’iš abnī) or "lord of the lands" (bēlu mātātum).

== Character ==
Zababa was regarded as a war god. However, inscription on kudurru (decorated boundary stones) and lists of deities in treaties indicate his importance was often considered secondary compared to Ninurta and Nergal. In texts from the reign of Hammurabi of Babylon Zababa, rather than Ninurta, appears as the primary war god, which according to Walther Sallaberger represents a development reflecting the proximity between Babylon and his cult center, Kish. His warlike character was reflected in the epithet qarrādum rabium, "great hero", though qarrādum ("hero") was routinely used to refer to many warrior deities.

The eagle was considered Zababa's symbolic animal, though it is unclear how the nature of this connection was understood. On kudurru he was represented by a staff topped with an image of this bird.

A constellation named after Zababa was recognized in Mesopotamian astronomy, and its individual stars, presumed to correspond to parts of modern Aquila, Ophiuchus and Serpens, could be referred to as parts of his body and clothing, with some of the attested examples including "Crown of Zababa", "Eye of Zababa" (Eta Ophiuchi), "Shoulder of Zababa", "Middle of Zababa" (Nu Ophiuchi), "Shin of Zababa" (Eta Serpentis) and "Foot of Zababa" (Lambda Aquilae).

== Associations with other deities ==
=== Family and court ===
Zababa could be regarded as a son of Enlil. Walther Sallaberger argues that it can be considered an example of a broader pattern of identifying warlike city gods as his sons, with other examples including Ningirsu and Nergal. In Assyria during the reign of Sennacherib Zababa started to be considered a son of Ashur instead. Wilfred G. Lambert assumed that much like contemporary references to Ninlil as Ashur's wife and Ninurta as another of his sons it is an example of assigning Enlil's family members to him to strengthen his new identity as the "Assyrian Enlil". A reference to Ashur being Zababa's father is known from Sennacherib's oracular inquiry meant to verify his parentage before the construction of a new temple dedicated to him and Bau in Assur, but this tradition is otherwise sparsely attested.

Bau, originally the wife of Ningirsu, could also be regarded as Zababa's wife. An early reference to this tradition can be found in the Lament for Sumer and Ur. In the god list An = Anum, Bau appears both in Zababa's (tablet V, line 48) and Ningirsu's (tablet V, line 56) sections. From the Middle Babylonian period onward, pairing her with Zababa became common. They appear as a couple in both Babylonian and Assyrian sources, for example in oath formulas and on kudurru. The pairing of Zababa with Bau reflects a broader archetypal pattern of couples consisting of a warrior god and a medicine goddess. Examples include Ningirsu and Bau, Ninisina and Pabilsaĝ, and Ninurta and Ninnibru.

Joan Goodnick Westenholz argues that before the introduction of Bau to Kish in the Old Babylonian period Inanna of Kish (to be distinguished from Inanna of Uruk) was regarded as Zababa's spouse. However, Ryan D. Winters points out that despite this assumption being commonly repeated in modern literature, no primary sources refer to them as a couple, and that texts where they appear together only affirm that both were both worshiped in Kish; (Note: John N. Postgate assumes that Inanna was worshiped in Kish primarily as the tutelary deity of the entire region as opposed to just the city, which he compares to the position of Enlil in Nippur.) he suggests it is not impossible that if a connection did exist between them, they might have equally likely been viewed as siblings in the local tradition instead. Andrew R. George states that listing them together simply reflected the fact they shared the role of the tutelary deity of Kish.

According to An = Anum, Papsukkal was regarded as Zababa's vizier (sukkal ^{d}za-ba_{4}-ba_{4}-ke_{4}; tablet V, line 49). Frans Wiggermann argues that while late sources refer to him as a son of Anu and descendant of Enmesharra, he might have originally been viewed as Zababa's son. For uncertain reasons, Zababa's section in An = Anum also includes Ugur (tablet V, line 50), who fulfilled the analogous role in the court of Nergal.

Two minor goddesses, Iqbi-damiq ("she said 'it is fine!'") and Ḫussinni ("Remember me!"), were associated with Zababa's temple, Edubba, and could be referred to as the "daughters of Edubba". Other similar pairs, collectively referred to as "divine daughters" by Assyriologists, were assosicated with other temples of northern Babylonia, such as Emeslam in Kutha (Tadmuštum and Belet-ili), Eibbi-Anum in Dilbat (Ipte-bita and Belet-eanni), Ezida in Borsippa (Kanisurra and Gazbaba) and Esagil in Babylon (Katunna and Silluš-tab). Wiggermann suggests that they pair from Kish might have been regarded as children of Zababa and his wife. However, George instead assumes that all of the pairs of "divine daughters" were maidservants in the household of the major deity or deities of a given temple. Wiggermann also argues that a further member of Zababa's entourage, Kūbu (a deity regarded as a stillborn infant), might have been his child as well.

Udulu, "day of violent storm", usually a title of Zababa and other war gods, could also be regarded as a minor god belonging to his court, and in reference to this role could be depicted in the form of an eagle. Wiggermann states he presumably functioned as an enforcer of Zababa's will, and compares him with Papsukkal, though he stresses the latter was not associated with birds of prey.

Further members of Zababa's court are known from Late Babylonian texts from Babylon and Kish, and include the divine judge Mandanu, the Nergal-like minor god Luḫušû, and a number of deified weapons, such as Igalim, Shulshaga, Šaggāšu, Kami-tāmûšu ("who binds the one who swears by him"; already attested in the Old Babylonian period), Muštēšir-ḫabli, Kakku-Šazu, Kakku-SAĞ.NINNU (or Kakku-SAĞ.PIRIĞ), Sharur and Shargaz, some of which were also associated with other gods. For instance, Igalim and Shulsaga were originally Ningirsu's sons, while Sharur and Shargaz - Ninurta's weapons.

=== Identification with other Mesopotamian deities ===
Zababa's character has been compared to Ninurta's. A degree of overlap is attested between their courts, and like Ninurta Zababa could be called the "crusher of stones" (dā’iš abnī), as attested in Bulluṭsa-rabi's Hymn to Gula. Sometimes, as attested for example in the Epic of Anzû (tablet III, line 32), the two could be equated. In the text KAR 142, the Archive of Mystic Heptads, Zababa is listed as one of the "seven Ninurtas", though in this context this name is a generic designation for warlike deities. In kudurru inscriptions and treaties, Zababa occurs separately from Ninurta, as a god of lesser importance.

The Syncretic Hymn to Marduk (tablet BM 47406) refers to Zababa as "Marduk of warfare". Beate Pongratz-Leisten argues that this reflects the absorption of other deities by the latter, and compares this process to the rise of Yahweh to prominence. However, Spencer J. Allen suggests that similar statements might be metaphorical, and that their aim was not outright equating Marduk with other gods, but rather comparing him to them to portray him as equally capable as them. In Zababa's case this would correspond to extolling Marduk as a similarly warlike figure. (Note: Regardless of the interpretation of the hymn, it is agreed the cult of Marduk never developed into a monotheistic religion.)

=== Identification with foreign war gods ===
In Bronze Age Anatolia, Zababa's name was used as a logogram ("Akkadogram") to represent the names of multiple other gods of similar warlike character. Walther Sallaberger assumes that this convention developed due to the influence of the First Dynasty of Babylon. Alice Mouton assumes that in Hattian and Hittite context Zababa's name designated Wurunkatte and less commonly Šulinkatte, (Note: His name could also be represented by the logogram ^{d}U.GUR.) in Hurrian Aštabi, Nupatik and Ḫešui, and in Luwian possibly Iyarri. (Note: In an earlier overview of the topic Gwendolyn Leick proposed Ḫašamili and Zappana as possible Hittite or Luwian readings as well.) However, according to Gernot Wilhelm interpreting ^{d}ZA.BA_{4}.BA_{4} as a logographic representation of Nupatik's name is erroneous, and in the Hurrian context it consistently refers to Ḫešui, with ^{d}LAMMA designating Nupatik instead. According to Alfonso Archi Aštabi's name was written as ^{d}NIN.URTA in Hurrian sources. However, Aštapinu, presumed to be a variant spelling of Aštabi is identified with both Zababa and Ninurta in the Mesopotamian god list informally referred to as "shorter An = Anum" due to sharing its namesake's first line, but not its scope. He is defined in it as the counterpart of these gods in Subartu, a common designation for northern areas, which according to Ryan D. Winters reflects the attested geographic distribution of references to his cult.

Wouter Henkelman proposes that the theonym Nabbazabba known from the Persepolis Fortification Archive might be an Elamite derivative of Zababa's name, possibly to be interpreted as "the god Zabba".

== Worship ==
=== Third millennium BCE ===
Zababa was the tutelary god of the city of Kish, as already attested in the oldest known source mentioning him, an early inscribed plaque. It dates to Early Dynastic II period (c. 2750-2600 BCE), and records prisoners of war most likely assigned to work on a date palm plantation and their points of origin. Zababa is mentioned in the final section of the text, which contains a brief reference to Kish, where the document presumably originated.

Based on archeological evidence it is assumed that a temple of Zababa already existed in Kish in the Early Dynastic period. Later sources indicate it bore the ceremonial Sumerian name Edubba, "storage house". (Note: The reading Ekišib is regarded as erroneous.) It could also be referred to as Emeteursag, "house worthy of the hero", though in later periods this ceremonial name was only used to a cella located within as opposed to the entire complex.

Zababa was also known outside Kish, further south in lower Mesopotamia. It is presumed that he was considered a major deity across the region in the Early Dynastic period. A reference to him has been identified in an inscription of Uḫub, an Early Dynastic ruler (ensi) of Kish, discovered in Nippur.

The seventeenth of the Zame Hymns from Abu Salabikh is dedicated to Zababa and Kish. It is one of the six hymns focused on deities of the northernmost part of lower Mesopotamia and the Diyala area, as opposed to southern or central parts of Lower Mesopotamia, Kish is described in it as a "goring ox" (gu_{4} du_{7}). Walther Sallaberger interprets this as an allusion to Zababa's warlike character. According to Manfred Krebernik and Jan Lisman, it might also reflect the city's reputation as an early political power or indicate a connection between its name and the archaic cuneiform sign GIR_{3}, "wild bull". Despite his position in the Zame Hymns, Zababa is seemingly absent from the preserved fragments of the god list from Abu Salabikh. However, it has been suggested that the entry ^{d}KIŠ^{ki} is a logographic representation of his name reflecting his close association with Kish.

Two doxologies invoking Zababa have also been identified in texts from Ebla. Sallaberger argues that it is possible to speak of a broader pattern of cultural influence of Kish on Ebla, and that the city's tutelary god Kura might have been a Zababa-like figure. However, according to Alfonso Archi it should be assumed that the references to Zababa in Eblaite texts were only a result of scribes faithfully copying texts originating elsewhere, as he is not attested in any other sources from this city.

The thirty fifth of the Temple Hymns is dedicated to Zababa. This composition has traditionally been attributed to Enheduanna, a daughter of Sargon of Akkad. However, in the Sargonic period Zababa does not occur commonly in theophoric names even in Kish, and his cult is poorly documented in the subsequent Ur III period as well.

=== Second millennium BCE ===
==== Old Babylonian period ====
In the Old Babylonian period Zababa continued to be worshiped in Kish both under the reign of an independent local dynasty and later under the First Dynasty of Babylon. Ašdūni-iārim, one of the members of the former, referred to himself as a "favorite" (migir) of Zababa. Zababa also occurs in oaths alongside another local ruler, Iawium, but according to Anne Goddeeris this situation is unique and other legal texts from the same city mention swearing oaths by kings from the Manana Dynasty or rulers of other settlements.

The highest ranked members of Zababa's clergy in Kish were the šangûm (temple administrator) and the gala-maḫ (chief gala). The latter rank is attested in most temples of major city deities across Mesopotamia, and its holders had a wide range of duties, including overseeing other gala, as well as managing temple offices and prebends. Only one person could hold the position of gala-maḫ of Zababa at a time. Four holders are known by name: Ka-Inanna (possibly during the reign of Samsu-iluna), Mea’imriaĝu (during the reign of Ammi-Ditana), Nanna-šalasud (during the reigns of Ammi-Saduqa and Samsu-Ditana) and Abandasa (after the reign of Samsu-Ditana). A community of nadītu dedicated to Zababa is attested as well.

Multiple theophoric names invoking Zababa are known from Old Babylonian Kish. Examples are also known from Sippar, though they are rare, and according to Rivkah Harris their bearers likely hailed from Kish, similarly to how Lagamal names point at an association with Dilbat and Numushda names - with Kazallu. In addition to Zababa himself, his temple could be invoked in theophoric names, as evidenced by examples such as Rīš-Edubbim.

There is evidence that the kings from the First Dynasty of Babylon showed a particular interest in Zababa. However, no temple dedicated to him existed in Babylon. Sumu-la-El of Babylon conquered Kish, and built the Emeteursag, which is first mentioned in one of his year formulas, for Zababa. In the twenty-second year of his reign he rebuilt a ziggurat located in Kish which was dedicated jointly to Zababa and Inanna of Kish. It bore the ceremonial name Eunirkitušmaḫ, "house, temple tower, exalted abode". Hammurabi rebuilt the Emeteursag in the thirty-sixth year of his reign. A hymn praising the same ruler refers to Zababa as his helper.

Zababa seemingly regained some of his early importance across other regions of Mesopotamia starting with the reign of Warad-Sin of Larsa. This ruler built a new temple dedicated to him in Ur, the Ekituššatenbi, "house, residence that soothes the heart", according to an inscription in order to celebrate the aid he received from this god in a struggle against his enemies. Walther Sallaberger suggests that this construction project might have been an attempt to gain the favor of a god more closely associated with the kingdom of Babylon, a political rival of Larsa.

Evidence for the worship of Zababa in Lagaba in the Old Babylonian period is available as well.

==== Kassite and Isin II periods ====
In the Kassite period work on Zababa's temple has been undertaken during the reign of Kurigalzu I. He is also attested in two theophoric names from Kassite Nippur. Furthermore, he was one of the Mesopotamian gods who start to appear in the theophoric names of rulers from the Kassite dynasty after the conquests of Tukulti-Ninurta I, which constituted a change in naming patterns, as before only Enlil and Kassite deities are attested in this context. The penultimate Kassite king bore the name Zababa-shuma-iddin.

A ritual text from Babylon which according to Wilfred G. Lambert must document a tradition predating the reign of Nebuchadnezzar I indicates that Zababa, accompanied by Bau, represented Kish in this city during the akitu festival of Marduk, alongside the deities associated with Kutha (Nergal, Laṣ, Mamitu) and Borsippa (Nabu, Nanaya and Sutītu).

A kudurru inscription of unknown provenance dated to the reign of Marduk-nadin-ahhe mentions Zababa after Anu, Enlil, Ea, Marduk, Nabu, Adad, Sin, Shamash, Ishtar, Gula, Ninurta and Nergal, and before Išḫara, Papsukkal and Anu Rabû. (Note: Anu Rabû, AN.GAL, is a well attested secondary name of Ištaran, the tutelary god of Der.)

Adad-apla-iddina from the Second Dynasty of Isin, who reigned over Babylonia in the early eleventh century BCE as an appointee of the Middle Assyrian king Ashur-bel-kala, left behind an inscription dealing with renovations of Zababa's temple, which refers to it as Emeteursag.

=== First millennium BCE ===
While the decades following the fall of the second dynasty of Isin are poorly documented, a reference to Zababa has been identified in a kudurru inscription from the reign of Nabû-mukin-apli from the middle of the tenth century BCE, in which he follows Anu, Enlil, Ea, Marduk, Zarpanit, Nabu, Sin, Shamash and Nergal, and precedes Adad, Ninurta, Gula and Ninmaḫ.

Zababa was also worshiped in Assyria in the Neo-Assyrian period, as first documented during the reign of Sennacherib, who ordered the construction of a temple dedicated to him in the capital after an oracular inquiry revealed that he is a son of the Assyrian head god Ashur. A list of shrines located in the Ešarra, the temple of Ashur in Assur, indicates that one of them was dedicated to Zababa. It has been proposed that in the same period Zababa was also a major member of the local pantheon of Arbela. A temple dedicated to him and Bau existed in this city. At one point, the office of the šangû priest of Zababa and Bau in this city, as well as in Huzirina and Harran, was held by Qurdi-Nergal. Eleanor Robson notes that in texts from an archive belonging to him and his family and students discovered in Huzirina these two deities occupy a central position. However, the assumption that Zababa held a prominent position in Arbela is not universally accepted due to the small number of references to his temple and clergy.

Both Neo-Assyrian and Neo-Babylonian sources record that one of the gates of Babylon was named after Zababa. Presumably it was located on the road to his cult center, Kish. It is presumed that it is identical with the "Kissian Gate" mentioned by Herodotus in his description of the city. The street running through it was known as Zababa-muḫalliq-gārîšu, "Zababa is the Destroyer of his Foes". However, other than the gate no other structures dedicated to Zababa existed in Babylon.

Zababa was worshiped in Uruk in the Neo-Babylonian period, though he is not attested in any earlier sources from this city. He was only a minor figure in the local pantheon, but he nonetheless possessed his own independent sanctuary (ekurrātu). Administrative texts mention a single priest in his service, a certain Ani-ili-taklak. Paul-Alain Beaulieu states that there is no evidence that Zababa continued to be worshiped in Uruk in later periods, but in a more recent publication Julia Krul points out that he is also attested there in the Seleucid period. He is mentioned alongside gods such as Alammuš, Amurru, Girra, Šulpae, Lugal-irra and Meslamta-ea in the instructions for the akitu festival of Anu. He is also mentioned in an inscription of a priest referring to himself as "Anu-uballiṭ, whose second name is Kephalon" in which he, Shamash, Adad and Sadarnunna are inquired about the preparation of a new statue of Ishtar. However, he is not attested in theophoric names or in legal texts.

A document from either the Neo-Babylonian period or later (BM 77433) mentions a temple of Zababa located in Tibira. Despite the similarity of the names, it is now agreed that this city is not identical with Bad-tibira, well attested as a cult center of Dumuzi, and was instead located in the immediate proximity of Babylon.

The last known reference to Zababa's Edubba in Kish is known from inscriptions of Nebuchadnezzar II, who rebuilt it jointly for him and Bau. A fragmentary text dated to the reign of Artaxerxes I mentions an "akitu temple" (bīt a-ki-tu_{4}) seemingly dedicated jointly to Zababa and Ninlil, which does not occur in any earlier sources. (Note: Ninlil seemingly replaced Ishtar in the local pantheon, as attested in sources from the reign of Marduk-apla-iddina II onward.) It is also known that Zababa continued to be worshiped in Kish during the reign of Alexander the Great. He continued to be commonly invoked in the theophoric names of local inhabitants, much like in earlier periods.

In the Seleucid period, Zababa's cult was transferred from Kish to Babylon, and he appears alongside Ninlil in texts from between 255 BCE and 94 BCE which indicate a temple dedicated to them was established in this city.

Christa Müller-Kessler and Karlheinz Kessler argue that the fact Zababa is absent from early Mandaic texts, in contrast with deities such as Nanaya or Nergal, might indicate that he ceased to be worshiped by the end of the first millennium BCE, before the time of their composition.

== Mythology ==
Walther Sallaberger states that no myths focused on Zababa are known. However, he is attested in literary texts as early as in the Early Dynastic period. For example, one of the UD.GAL.NUN compositions has the form of dialogue between Zababa and Enlil. However, it does not mention Kish, and describes the construction of the temple of Enlil in Nippur.

Possibly due to the early importance of Kish as a political center, Zababa is referenced in a number of legends about the rulers of the Akkadian Empire. A fictional letter attributed to Sargon which belonged to the curriculum of scribal schools mentions Zababa alongside Shamash, Ilaba and Annunitum as one of the deities who oblige the king's allies to assist him in a campaign against Purushanda in Anatolia. Furthermore, Sargon's adversary known from a variety of literary texts, the legendary king of Kish Ur-Zababa, bore a theophoric name invoking this god which can be translated as "man of Zababa". (Note: Ur-Zababa is also attested as an ordinary given name in Early Dynastic Lagash and Ur III Adab.) In an epic dealing with Naram-Sin's siege of Apishal, Zababa is said to be one of the deities accompanying this king during his campaigns.

In the myth Urash and Marduk (Note: In this context the name Urash designates the tutelary god of Dilbat, not the identically named goddess.) Zababa is mentioned in a damaged section alongside his cult center Kish. This composition is only known from a single Late Babylonian copy from Ur, but according to Wilfred G. Lambert it might have been originally composed in Dilbat in the Old Babylonian or Kassite period.

A reference to Zababa taking residence in Kish is present in a sequence listing tutelary gods of different cities in the myth Enmesharra's Defeat. It is known only from a single copy, which has been dated to the Seleucid or Parthian period, and most likely originated in Babylon.
