= Enmesharra =

Mesopotamian deity

Enmesharra 𒀭𒂗𒈨𒊹𒊏
- Primordial god, god of the underworld
- Abode: underworld

Genealogy
- Consort: Ninmesharra
- Children: Usually 7 sons analogous to the Sebitti, named Zisummu, Adgìrḫaš, Šegbarimime, Urbaddumu, Urbadagubgubu, Gubagarae, and Abara-DU.DU; Up to eight or fifteen children total; Shuzianna; Papsukkal (sometimes)

Equivalents
- Hurrian: Namšara (possibly)

Enmesharra (Sumerian: 𒀭𒂗𒈨𒊹𒊏 Enmešarra, "Lord of all mes") was a Mesopotamian god associated with the underworld. He was regarded as a member of an old generation of deities, and as such was commonly described as a ghost or resident of the underworld. He is best known from various lists of primordial deities, such as the "theogony of Enlil," which lists many generations of ancestral deities.

Various fragmentary myths describe confrontations between him and deities such as Enlil, Ninurta or Marduk. The myth Enlil and Namzitara describes him as Enlil's paternal uncle, and alludes to a belief that he was the ruler of the universe in the distant past, possibly after usurping the position of his nephew. He has been compared with Anzu, who in the corresponding myth also steals Enlil's right to declare destinities for himself.

Texts commonly mention his children, usually identified as the "Seven sons of Enmesharra," analogous to the Sebitti. Specific deities who could be identified as his children or descendants were Shuzianna and Papsukkal, among others.

== Character ==
Enmesharra's name means "lord of all me (essences)" in Sumerian. Henry W. F. Saggs assumes that he "had his origin in theological speculation rather than that he was an otiose deity of popular religion." Wilfred G. Lambert similarly concludes that he originated "solely from the theogony of Enlil," a term he uses to refer to lists of Enlil's ancestors and other primordial deities.

Enmesharra is best attested as a primordial deity who was believed to be active long before the gods actively worshiped by the Mesopotamians. A prayer meant to be recited before the foundation of a temple refers to him as lord of the underworld. This title was also applied to other deities, including Ninazu, his son Ningishzida, Nergal and Nirah. A references to Enmesharra residing in the underworld is known from the Old Babylonian myth Death of Gilgamesh, where he is mentioned alongside the various ancestors of Enlil. Early Assyriologists viewed Enmesharra as "Akkadian Pluto," which lead to the incorrect notion that he was one and the same as Nergal.

It is presumed that most sources referring to Enmesharra understand him as a deceased deity. For example, a text makes references to Enmesharra being burned and existing in the form of a ghost. One text from Nippur mentions that he was "laid to rest" after a confrontation between him and either Enlil or Ninurta occurred in Shuruppak. However, a single source states that Enmesharra himself avoided death, and his sons died instead: "Enmesharra (...) to save his own life, handed over his sons."

The myth Enmesharra's Defeat assigns a unique epithet to him, zi-mu-ú ("splendour"), and states that this quality was reassigned to Shamash after his defeat. Wilfred G. Lambert considers it a possibility that Enmesharra's association with light could have stemmed from the fact that Ninmesharra, the feminine equivalent of his name, was a title of Inanna, well known as a luminous deity due to her role as a representation of Venus. Inanna's luminous nature is described for example in a hymn which connects her various abilities, such as providing advice to humans or seemingly complementing evil with good with the light exuded by the corresponding celestial body. The name Ninmesharra, "lady of all me," is best known from a composition of Enheduanna, where it refers to Inanna, though it could also be applied as an epithet to Enlil's wife Ninlil. Occasional references to Ninmesharra as an independent figure, a companion of Enmesharra from lists of theogonic deities, are also known. In one case, Enmesharra and Ninmesharra are described as "father and mother of all the gods."

Frans Wiggermann initially assumed that Enmesharra might be understood as an abstract representation of the concept of kingship, based on a mythical episode where he passes the insignia of kingship on to Anu and Enlil. However, later he embraced the notion that being a primordial deity, he represented the "brainless old cosmos" predating the period of Enlil's "just rule."

One Babylonian text (CBS 6060), a compendium explaining which deities correspond to various building materials, associates Enmesharra with gold, though in another similar text, presumed to be older, this metal is instead associated with Enlil. A plant called anameru was associated with him in sources from the first millennium BCE, as were two birds, the cock and the šuššuru.

== Iconography ==
On this basis of Enmesharra's apparent luminous character in the myth Enmesharra's Defeat, Wilfred G. Lambert proposed that some figures on cylinder seals with rays of light emanating on their shoulders might be depictions of Enmesharra, rather than the sun god Shamash. Additionally, he proposed that a unique relief depicting a god stabbing a cyclops with rays emanating from his head might depict his defeat. Other interpretations of the figures on this artifact, originally excavated in Khafajah (ancient Tubub) have been proposed too, including Marduk killing Tiamat and Ninurta killing Asag, though neither of these found widespread support, and art historian Anthony Green showed skepticism regarding them, noting art might preserve myths not known from textual record. According to Andrew R. George Akkadian omen texts from Susa and from the Sealand archives appears to indicate that one-eyed creatures were known as igidalu, igidaru or igitelû, possibly a loanword from Sumerian igi dili ("one eye"). He remarks that the only god associated with them in available sources is Nergal, who in an omen text is identified as the slayer of an igitelû. There is also evidence that the birth of one-eyed animals was regarded as an omen connected to Nergal.

Frans Wiggermann proposes that the so-called "birdman" figure from cylinder seals might represent Enmesharra. Unlike the better known eagle-like Anzu, the "birdman" appears to have the lower body of a water bird. Wiggermann argues that the scenes involving this being might indicate he was imagined as challenging the divine authority. Since the same role belongs to Enmesharra in textual sources, he proposes that the two of them are one and the same, though he admits there is no indication in any known sources that the latter was ever regarded as bird-like.

== Associations with other deities ==
Ancient commentaries at times equate Enmesharra with other, usually cosmogonic, figures: Lugaldukuga, Anu, Qingu, Alala and otherwise largely unknown Ubnu.

Enmesharra belonged to the group of ancestral gods associated with Enlil, though he held a special status within it. Lists of ancestors of Enlil, who are matching En- and Nin- pairs much like Enlil and his wife Ninlil, could be followed by Enmesharra, listed without a spouse and not labeled as an ancestor directly. Enumerations of such figures start with the pair Enki-Ninki, and sometimes they were referred to simply as "Enkis and Ninkis," ^{d}En-ki-e-ne ^{d}Nin-ki-e-ne. Texts from Fara and Abu Salabikh from the Early Dynastic period already attest the existence of these pairs. References are also known from Ebla, where in one text Enki and Ninki are linked with roots of the tamarisk. While it is consistent that Enki and Ninki were the oldest generation of Enlil's ancestors, the rest of the family tree was not fixed, and various pairs of En- and Nin- deities appear in known sources. Enki, the ancestor of Enlil, is not to be confused with the god Enki/Ea, who is a distinct and unrelated figure. The ancestral Enki's name means "lord earth" while the meaning of the name of the god of Eridu is uncertain but not the same, as indicated by some writings including an amissable g.

Similar lists of ancestors of Anu are also known, but it is assumed that they were not of equal importance in Mesopotamian theology.

According to the myth Enlil and Namzitara, Enmesharra was Enlil's uncle, the brother of his father. Multiple traditions regarding Enlil's father are known, with Anu or Lugaldukuga being particularly commonly listed. The latter could also be regarded as his grandfather. The god list An = Anum inserts him between Enmesharra and his seven sons. According to Wilfred G. Lambert, while it is likely that traditions where Enmesharra himself played this role also existed, direct statements confirming this are not presently known from any texts.

Lugaldukuga could be associated both with Enmesharra and by extension with a group of defeated gods called "the seven conquered Enlils," to which the latter belonged. His name points at his association with the duku, a cosmic mound from the theology of Nippur, which was sometimes also associated with Enmesharra according to Frans Wiggermann. The duku was the place where destinites were determined, and a primordial dwelling of the gods. The name Lugaldukuga was independently also used as an epithet of Ea, but due to absence of evidence for the view that Ea was the father or grandfather of Enlil it is assumed that these two applications of it did not overlap.

Enmesharra was usually believed to have seven sons, though exceptions are known. A source from Kish mentions eight, while a single incantation references fifteen of them. In a neo-Babylonian inventory of divine statues, the Sebitti are identified as seven of the fifteen sons of Enmesharra. The seven sons and Sebitti often functioned as synonyms, though the latter were also equated with other groups of seven deities, for example the so-called "Divine Seven of Elam," a Mesopotamian grouping of Elamite gods. Different identities of the Sebitti could be sometimes merged, for example the Elamite goddess Narunde, in Mesopotamia identified as a sister of the Divine Seven of Elam, in at least one ritual appears alongside Sebitti labeled as "sons of Enmesharra." This term could also denote the asakku demons, though they were called "sons of Anu" as well. While the suggestions that seven sons of Enmesharra can be identified as the seven apkallu were present in early scholarship, this theory is not considered credible today.

Frans Wiggermann proposes that a single text commenting on magical formulas meant to protect a house from supernatural invaders confuses Enmesharra with the goddess Išḫara, as it identifies Sebitti as her children, an otherwise unknown genealogy.

Shuzianna, a goddess associated with Enlil sometimes identified as his concubine or as the nurse of his son Sin appears in enumerations of the seven children of Enmesharra. In this context she appears in a ritual text from Hellenistic Uruk.

A prayer to the messenger god Papsukkal calls him "supreme vizier, offspring of Enmesharra." In one case, Papsukkal is listed right behind Enmesharra in a list of defeated gods.

Alfonso Archi considers it possible that the name of Namšara, one of the so-called "primordial gods," divine ancestors inhabiting the underworld in Hurrian mythology, was derived from Enmesharra.

== Mythology ==
The myth Enlil and Namzitara refers directly to confrontation between Enlil and Enmesharra, which is sometimes referred to as the "Enmesharra myth" in scholarship. It states that at one point Enmesharra took over "Enlilship" in order to "know the fates like a lord.: Wilfred G. Lambert presumes that based on the wording used the myth refers to unlawful seizure of Enlil's right to declare destinies, denoted by the term "Enlilship." A few known copies of this text do not add the dingir sign, used to indicate divinity, to Enmesharra s name.

A brief mythical account present in an Akkadian incantation states that Enmesharra passed on the insignia of kingship to Anu and Enlil, though the wording used makes it impossible to determine if the action was voluntary. Frans Wiggermann notes that the text appears to allude to Enmesharra possessing "higher aspirations" despite being referred to as the lord of the underworld. He also assumes that the fact one of the objects in mention was a staff might be why Papsukkal was described on one occasion as "son of Anu, offspring of Enmesharra." A staff was commonly understood as a badge of office received from a higher power in Mesopotamian texts: kings were said to receive staffs from the head gods of the pantheon, like Enlil or Inanna, and sukkals (attendant deities), such as Ninshubur, Papsukkal or Nuska, were believed to carry staffs bestowed upon them by their masters, treated as their attribute.

Another fragment describes Enmesharra as imprisoned on the orders of Dagan (according to Wilfred G. Lambert treated as a synonym of Enlil in this context), and watched over by a group described as "standing gods," led by either Sin or Nabu.

The myth Enmesharra's Defeat, only known from a single, heavily damaged tablet from the Seleucid or Parthian period, based on the colophon assumed to only be the ending of the narrative, describes a conflict between Enmesharra and Marduk, as well as its aftermath. It also features Nergal as the warden of the eponymous antagonist and his seven sons, here identified as the Sebitti. In the surviving fragments, Enmesharra unsuccessfully pleads to be spared, and is subsequently escorted to Marduk's dwelling alongside the Sebitti. After reminding him of his unknown crime, Marduk deprives Enmesharra of his luminosity, which is subsequently given to Shamash, and presumably executes him, though the line clarifying his fate is not preserved. The rest of the narrative deals with assigning new domains to various gods, and in addition to Marduk and Nergal also features Nabu, Shamash, Zababa, Sin, Adad, Enlil, Urash and Erimbinatuku, possibly an otherwise unknown epithet of Pabilsag. Marduk, Nergal and Nabu end up sharing lordship over the universe, which seemingly originally belonged to Anu in this composition. Wilfred G. Lambert notes these gods were the 3 most prominent deities in the neo-Babylonian state pantheon, and that certain aspects of the work, like Marduk appearing in roles normally assigned to Enlil, might indicate it was a work of "Babylonian chauvinism" or that it was composed during a period of Nippur's irrelevance.

It has been proposed that an unknown myth about a battle between Marduk and an Enmesharra-like figure who unjustly seized the tablets of destiny was one of the sources used to form the narrative of Enuma Elish, especially the role Qingu plays in it. However, direct references to a conflict between Enmesharra and Marduk are rare, one exception (other than Enmesharra's Defeat) being the so-called Bird Call Text, which refers to Marduk under the variant name Tutu:

The cock is the bird of Enmešarra. Its cry is, "You sinned against Tutu."

Another myth dealing with the defeat of Enmesharra, of which only eighteen lines survive, has been tentatively titled The Defeat of Enutila, Enmesharra and Qingu by Wilfred G. Lambert. The surviving fragment describes the aftermath of a conflict between gods, which seemingly takes place in Babylon, with direct references to temples known from historical sources, such as Eturkalama. Due to the large number of deities involved (in addition to Enmesharra: his seven sons, Tiamat, Apsu, Nabu, Ninurta, Enutila, Ishtar of Babylon, Qingu, Marduk and Ninzaginna) it is possible that the text was a scholarly compilation consisting of elements of formerly independent narratives, possibly including Enuma Elish, rather than a myth which arose organically. One of the surviving lines directly refers to Enmesharra being "taken by the sword." Enutila, mentioned in this myth, was another figure who like Enmesharra could be listed in texts dealing with theogony alongside ancestors of Enlil, but did not necessarily play the role of one of them.

== Worship ==
The worship of Enmesharra is attested as early as in the Ur III period. He appears in a long list of offerings from Puzrish-Dagan, according to which a "grain-fed ox" was scarified to him in Nippur. He continued to be associated with Nippur through the second and first millennia BCE. In the Esagil temple complex in Babylon, a seat was dedicated jointly to him and Enbilulu. It bore the name du_{6}.ki.sikil, "mound, pure place."

Multiple references to mourning rites connected to Enmesharra are known. They took part in the month Tebetu. According to one text, they were believed to be originally established by the goddess Gula. Another mentions the mourning rites of Enmesharra, Lugaldukuga and Tammuz side by side, stating that each of these festivals took place in a different month. A late theological commentary from Assur states that during a ritual the corpse of Enmesharra was transported in the chariot of Ninurta, drawn by the ghost of Anzu. The connection between Anzu and Enmesharra most likely developed due to both of them playing a similar role in mythology, namely challenging Enlil's rule by taking over his position as the god declaring the fates. Further associations between Enmesharra and chariots are known, for example another late Assyrian text states that his dwelling place was "the chariot house of Enlil," according to Andrew R. George the name of a seat in the Esharra temple in Assur.

Another late explanatory text mentions a "taboo of Enmesharra" described as "waking up the sleeper." It has been proposed that it was a euphemism pertaining to disturbing the dead. However, it is also possible that it should be understood literally. In another case, cats are described as "taboo of Enmesharra," based on an unspecified connection with a mythical episode describing his defeat.
