= Ekur =

Sacred building of ancient Sumer

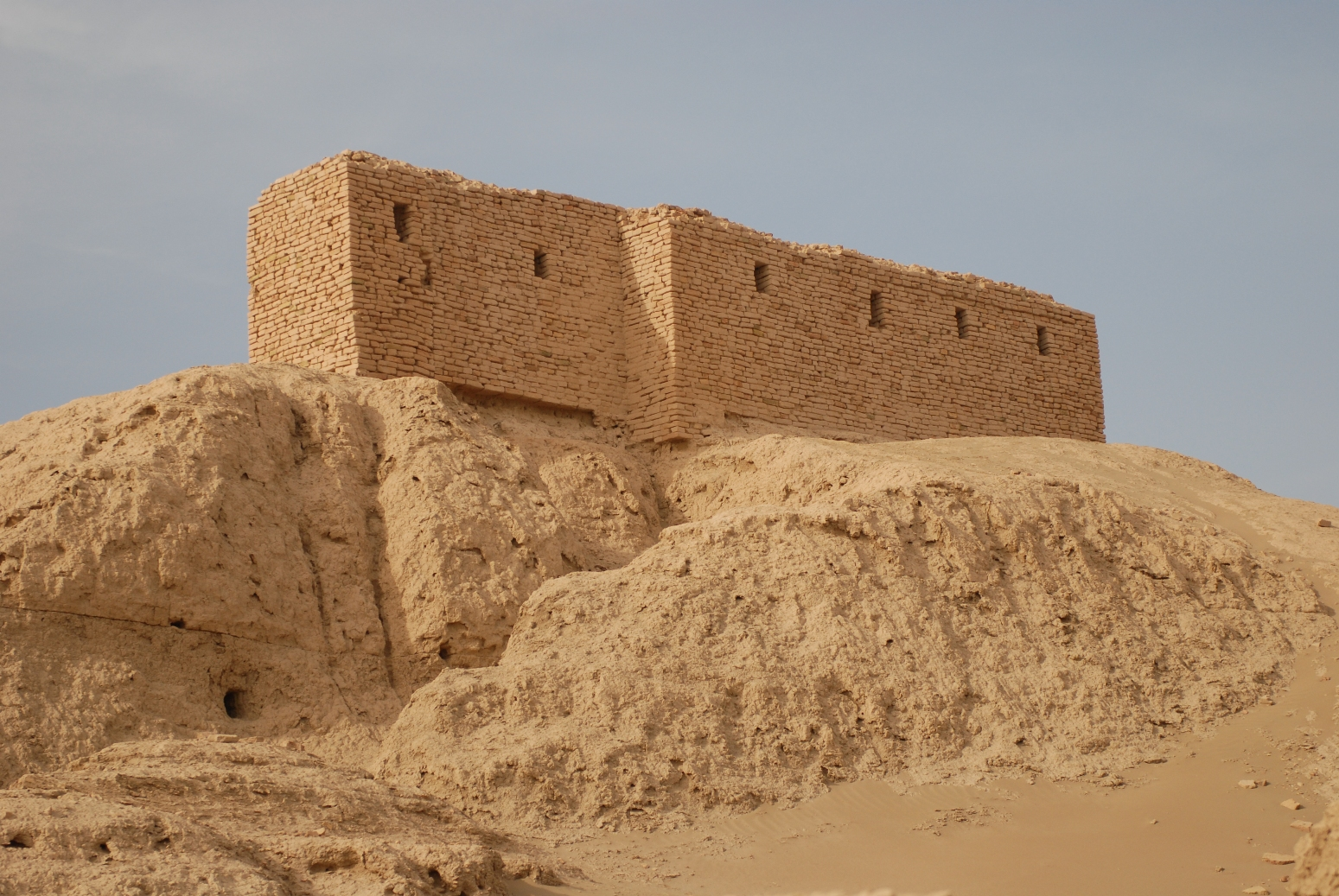
Modern reconstruction of a mountain house at Nippur

Ekur (𒂍𒆳 É.KUR), also known as Duranki, is a Sumerian term meaning "mountain house". It is the assembly of the gods in the Garden of the gods, parallel in Greek mythology to Mount Olympus and was the most revered and sacred building of ancient Sumer.

== Origin and meaning ==
There is a clear association of Ziggurats with mountain houses. Mountain houses play a certain role in Mesopotamian mythology and Assyro-Babylonian religion, associated with deities such as Anu, Enlil, Enki and Ninhursag. In the Hymn to Enlil, the Ekur is closely linked to Enlil whilst in Enlil and Ninlil it is the abode of the Annunaki, from where Enlil is banished. The fall of Ekur is described in the Lament for Ur. In mythology, the Ekur was the centre of the earth and location where heaven and earth were united. It is also known as Duranki and one of its structures is known as the Kiur ("great place"). Enamtila has also been suggested by Piotr Michalowski to be a part of the Ekur. A hymn to Nanna illustrates the close relationship between temples, houses and mountains. "In your house on high, in your beloved house, I will come to live, O Nanna, up above in your cedar perfumed mountain".

The Tummal Inscription records the first king to build a temple to Enlil as Enmebaragesi, the predecessor of Gilgamesh, around 2500 BC. Ekur is generally associated with the temple at Nippur restored by Naram-Sin of Akkad and Shar-Kali-Sharri during the Akkadian Empire. It is also the later name of the temple of Assur rebuilt by Shalmaneser I. The word can also refer to the chapel of Enlil in the temple of Ninimma at Nippur. It is also mentioned in the Inscription of Gaddas as a temple of Enlil built "outside Babylon", possibly referring to the Enamtila in west Babylon. It is used as part of such Sumerian phrases as e-kur-igi-gal; "House, Mountain Endowed with Sight", e-kur-igi-bar-ra; "House, Mountain which Sees", e-kur-mah; "House, Exalted Mountain", e-kur-mah; a temple of Ninazu, e-kur-me-sikil; "House, Mountain of Pure Mes (laws or judgement)" - a sanctuary of Ishtar, e-kur-nam-ti-la; "House, Mountain of Life", e-kur-ni-zu; "House, Fearsome Mountain" - the sanctuary of Ninlil at hursag-kala-ma (likely a later name of e-hursag-kalam-ma), etc.

The Ekur was seen as a place of judgement and the place from which Enlil's divine laws are issued. The ethics and moral values of the site are extolled in myths, which Samuel Noah Kramer suggested would have made it the most ethically-oriented in the entire ancient Near East. Its rituals are also described as: "banquets and feasts are celebrated from sunrise to sunset" with "festivals, overflowing with milk and cream, are alluring of plan and full of rejoicing". The priests of the Ekur festivities are described with en being the high priest, lagar as his associate, mues the leader of incantations and prayers, and guda the priest responsible for decoration. Sacrifices and food offerings were brought by the king, described as "faithful shepherd" or "noble farmer".

== The Ekur complex ==
The physical structure of the Ekur included shrines and storehouses where foreigners brought offerings. These included the shrines of Enlil's wife Ninlil (her chamber, the Gagisua is described as the place where they lived happily together) and their sons, Nanna and Ninurta along with the house of his vizier Nuska and mistress Suzianna. Descriptions of these locations show the physical structures about the Ekur, these included an assembly hall, hut for ploughs, a lofty stairway up a foothill from a "house of darkness" considered by some to be a prison or chasm. It also contained various gates such as the gate "where no grain was cut", the "lofty gate", "gate of peace" and "gate of judgement", it also had drainage channels. Other locations such as a multi-story "giguna" are mentioned, among others which have proved unintelligible, even to modern scholars.

The Ekur was noted for inspiring fear, dread, terror and panic in people, especially amongst the evil and ignorant. Kramer suggested the Ekur complex may have included a primordial dungeon of the netherworld or "house of lament" where the damned were sent after judgement. Nungal is the Sumerian goddess who was given the title "Queen of the Ekur". The hymn Nungal in the Ekur describes the dark side of the complex with a house that "examines closely both the righteous and the wicked and does not allow the wicked to escape". This house is described as having a "River of ordeal" which leads to the "mouth of catastrophe" through a lock and bolt. Further descriptions of its structural components are given including foundations, doors, a fearsome gate, architrave, a buttressed structure called a "dubla" and a magnificent vault, all described with terrifying metaphors. The hymn also references a "house of life" where sinners are rehabilitated and returned to their gods through the compassion of Nungal, who holds the "tablet of life".

The destruction and fall of these various structures is remembered in various City Laments, destroyed either in a great storm, flood or by variously Elamites, Subarians, Gutians and some other, as yet unidentified "Su-people". It was also recorded that the terrible acts of final destruction of the Ekur and its divine laws was committed by Sargon the Great against his own people in approximately 2300 BC. The Curse of Agade describes the same thing happening at the hands of Naram-Sin "Enlil, because his beloved Ekur had been attacked, what destruction he wrought". The foundations are broken with large axes and its watercourses are disabled, the "gate of peace" is demolished and wars start all over the land, statues are burnt and wealth carried off. There is a body of evidence showing that Naram-Sin instead rebuilt the Ekur, likely in a single building project that continued into the reign of his son Shar-Kali-Sharri, suggesting it was destroyed during Gutian raids. It was noted that statues of the Sargonic kings were still honoured there during the Ur III period. Restorations of the Ekur were later carried out by Ur-Nammu around 2050 BC and Ishme-Dagan around 1950 BC, who made it fragrant again with incense "like a fragrant cedar forest". Evidence was also found of further building work under the reign of Agum Kakrime. Another restoration at Nippur was carried out by Assyrian and Babylonian king Esarhaddon between 681 and 669 BC.

A hymn to Urninurta mentions the prominence of a tree in the courtyard of the Ekur, reminiscent of the tree of life in the Garden of Eden: "O, chosen cedar, adornment of the yard of Ekur, Urinurta, for thy shadow the country may feel awe!". This is suggested by G. Windgren to reflect the concept of the tree as a mythical and ritual symbol of both king and god.

== The Ekur Archive ==
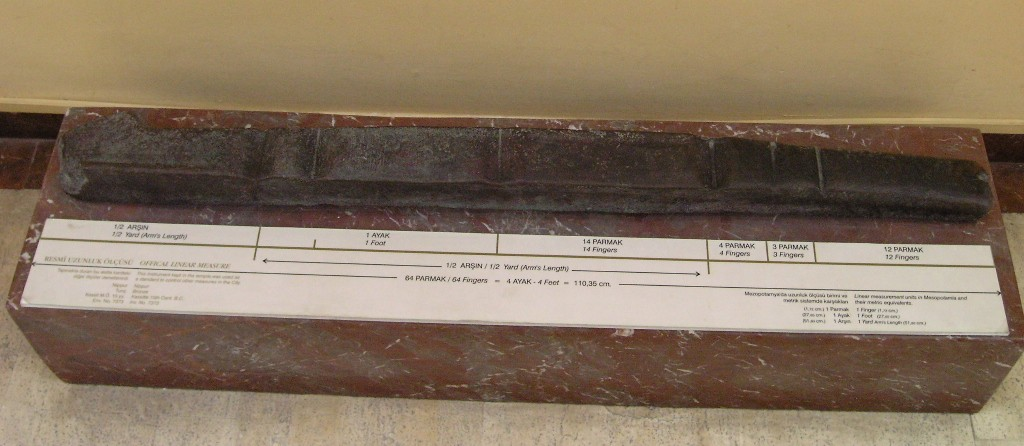
Nippur cubit, graduated specimen of an ancient measure from Nippur, Mesopotamia (3rd millennium B.C.) – displayed in the Archeological Museum of Istanbul (Turkey).

The Ekur reconstruction project was documented in the Ekur archive; a number of administrative tablets found under the Ur Gur platform or pavement level. These were found by an expedition from the University of Pennsylvania between 1889 and 1900, led by John Punnett Peters, John Henry Haynes, and Hermann Volrath Hilprecht. The tablets detail records of the building work and furnishings of the temple under Naram-Sin and Shar-Kali-Sharri. These tablets describe the walls featuring statues of four gold bison. The courtyard was paved with a pattern of red and yellow bricks. The main entrance to the Ekur was adorned with two copper lahmu-figures with golden faces. These obscure figures held emblem-poles on either side. Two figures of large, winged, copper dragons guarded the gateway, their roaring mouths inlaid with gold. The doors were studded with copper and gold with heavy bolts resembling either dragons or water buffalo. The interior likely featured an exquisite, carved wooden decorations, panelling and furniture. Inner shrines had doors, which were also built with golden faced lahmu-figures either side along with a number of votive statues plated with gold. Around twenty nine kilograms of gold was used making one hundred moon crescents and one hundred sun discs used in the decorations. Two hundred kilograms of silver were used in the construction of a single shrine. No records of any personal adornments or jewellery were ever found in the Ekur.

A total of seventy seven joiners were used in teams of eleven under seven foremen and fifty four carpenters under three foremen. Eighty six goldsmiths were employed under six foremen along with ten sculptors. The vast amounts of bronze suggested there were as many as two hundred smiths under fifteen foremen and an unknown number of engravers under three foremen. The Ekur archive is a testament to the power and wealth of the Akkadian Empire with artisans coming from around the land to participate under the direction of the master craftsman and 'Minister of Public Works' of the King. Manufacture was suggested to have taken place both in the temple and special workshop (Nippur cubit measuring rod pictured). The splendour of the designs and decorations led Age Westenholz to suggest the analogy of this spiritual sanctuary to the Sumerian empire with that of the Vatican to the Roman Catholic world. The chief administrator of the Ekur or "sanga" of Enlil was appointed by the king and held special status in Nippur and votive inscriptions of the kings indicate that it had held this position since early dynastic times.

== Cosmology ==
Peter Jensen also associated the Ekur with the underworld in "Die Kosmologie der Babylonier", where he translated it as a settlement of demons. The location also appears in Ludlul bēl nēmeqi and other myths as a home of demons who go out into the land. It is noted by Wayne Horowitz that in none of the bilingual texts do the demons appear to be "going upwards" but "outwards", contrary to what would be expected if Ekur referred to later concepts such as Sheol, Hades and Hell, which were believed to be located under the surface of the earth. Morris Jastrow discussed the place of the Ekur in Sumerian cosmology, "Another name which specifies the relationship of Aralu to the world is Ekur or 'mountain house' of the dead. Ekur is one of the names for the earth, but is applied more particularly to that part of the mountain, also known as E-khar-sag-kurkura (É.ḪAR.SAG.KUR.KUR-'a' "house of the mountain of all lands") where the gods were born. Before the later speculative view was developed, according to which the gods, or most of them, have their seats in heaven, it was on this mountain also that the gods were supposed to dwell. Hence Ekur became also one of the names for temple, as the seat of a god."

== In Mandaic texts ==
In Chapter 18 of the Right Ginza, the Ekur is referred to in Mandaic as ekura (Classical Mandaic: ࡏࡊࡅࡓࡀ).

== See also ==
- Lament for Nippur
- Kesh temple hymn
- Hymn to Enlil
- Debate between sheep and grain
- Debate between Winter and Summer
- Lament for Ur
- Hursag
- Hubur
- Du-Ku
