= Alalu =

Primordial figure from Hurrian and Mesopotamian mythology

- Primordial god
- Other names: Alala, Alal
- Affiliation: Hurrian primeval deities
- Major cult center: Emar

Genealogy
- Spouse: Belili (in Mesopotamia); possibly Amizzadu (in Hurrian tradition)
- Children: Anu (in Mesopotamia); Kumarbi (in Hurrian tradition)

Alalu or Alala was a primordial figure in Mesopotamian and Hurrian mythology. He is also known from documents from Emar, where he was known as Alal. While his role was not identical in these three contexts, it is agreed that all three versions share the same origin. Hurrian Alalu, who plays the role of the oldest king of gods in the Kumarbi Cycle, is the best known, and is commonly discussed in scholarship focused on comparative mythology but it is agreed Mesopotamian Alala represents the oldest tradition regarding this being. However, the precise etymology of his name is unknown, and likely neither Sumerian nor Semitic. Both Hurrian and Mesopotamian sources attest an association between him and Anu, but its nature varies between cultures.

== Mesopotamian sources ==
The origin of the name Alala is not known, and in scholarship it is tentatively grouped with other Mesopotamian deity names with no clear Sumerian or Semitic etymologies, such as Zababa, Aruru or Bunene.

Alala is known from the so-called Theogony of Anu, a name Wilfred G. Lambert applied to lists of Anu's ancestors known from god lists, a variant of which was worked into the genealogy of Marduk presented in Enuma Elish. The pairs of ancestral gods appearing in various configurations in such lists include Duri and Dari, Lahmu and Lahamu, Anshar and Kishar, Enurulla and Ninurulla, Engur and Gara, and Alala and Belili. Frans Wiggermann proposes that this tradition had its origin in northern Mesopotamia. Most variants start with Duri and Dari, who likely represented time, and end with Alala and Belili, indicating that they were viewed as parents of Anu. The pairing of these two deities was most likely based entirely on both of their names being iterative. Belili is very sparsely attested otherwise, and was not paired with Alalu outside the theogonic lists. Based on a brief mention in Šurpu it has been proposed that she was associated with the underworld. An old theory that her name was a corruption of Belet-ili is regarded as baseless today, and the actual etymology of her name is unknown.

A late text equates Alala with two other primordial figures, Enmesharra and Lugaldukuga. Lugaldukuga was regarded as the father or grandfather of Enlil in some traditions, while Enmesharra was a god listed alongside his ancestors but usually not explicitly identified as one of them. A tradition in which he was Enlil's paternal uncle is also known.

A mention of Alala "coming down to the land" in the distant past "before creation" is known from a brief mythological introduction to a late Assyrian version of an incantation pertaining to ergot, though he is absent from a similar Old Babylonian text. A few Maqlû incantations allude to Alala, for example referring to time "before Ningirsu gave utterance to Alala in the land". According to Lambert, in these passages he might represent a deified work cry or work song, in a similar way as the god Girra represented deified fire. Volkert Haas instead argued he was considered a personification of storm surge.

== Hurrian and Hittite sources ==
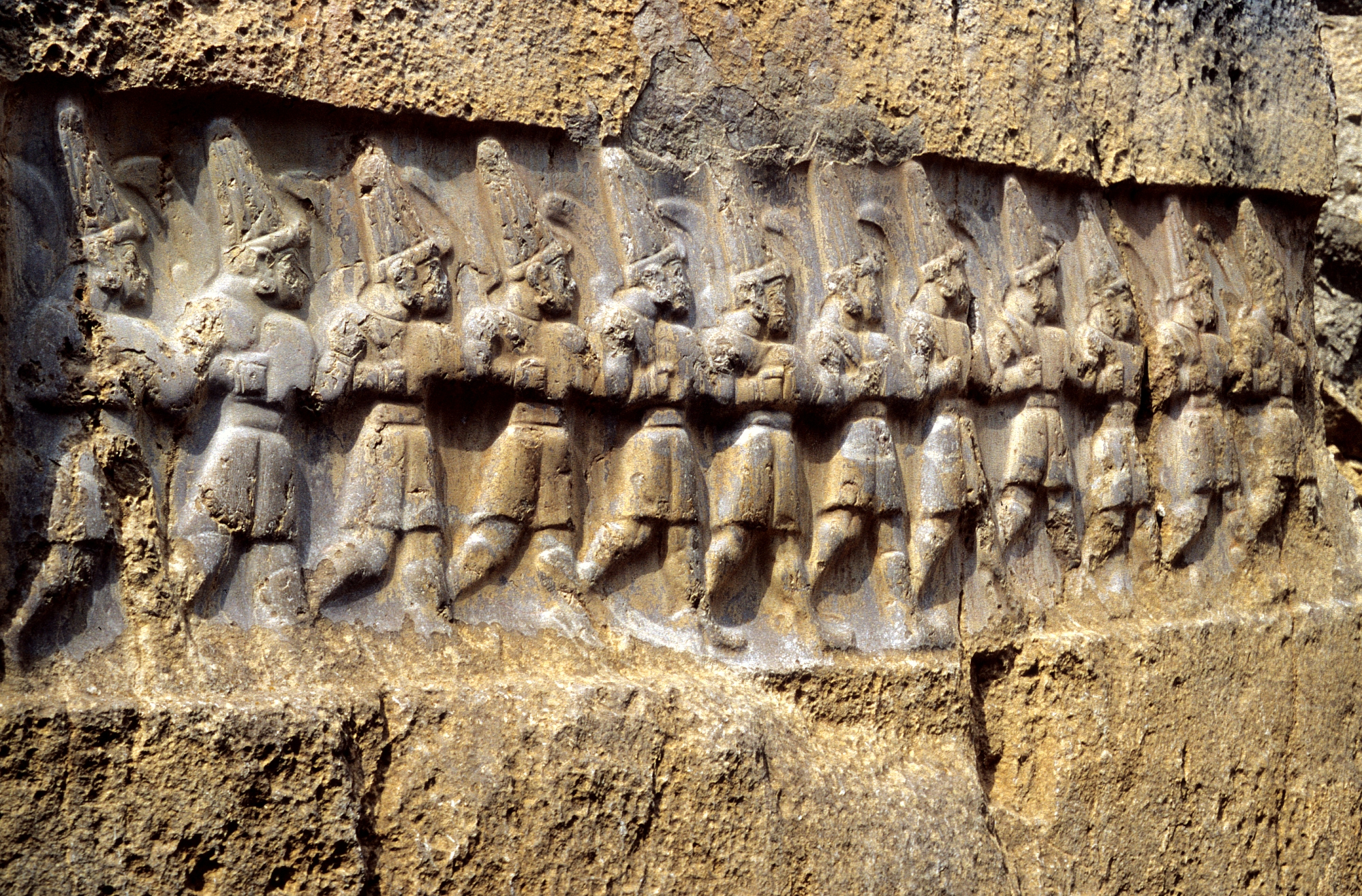
A relief from the Yazılıkaya sanctuary depicting primeval deities.

It is agreed that the Hurrian god Alalu was a figure of Mesopotamian origin. He was regarded as one of the enna turena or ammadena enna, so-called "primeval gods" inhabiting the underworld. This group of deities is depicted on one of the reliefs from the Yazılıkaya sanctuary. Like its other members, Alalu could serve as a divine witness of international treaties, one example being that between Hittite king Muwatalli II and Alaksandu. Only two ritual texts, one purely Hurrian and one Hurro-Hittite, mention Alalu, in both cases among the primeval gods.

=== Mythology ===
Alalu is mentioned in the proem of the first part of the Kumarbi Cycle, Song of Emergence, a Hittite adaptation of Hurrian myths which relays that "formerly, in ancient times" he was the king of the gods ("king in heaven"), but in the ninth year of his reign he was overthrown by his cup-bearer, Anu, and as a result had to flee to the Dark Earth, the underworld. Wilfred G. Lambert proposed that a hitherto unknown Mesopotamian myth about confrontation between Alala and Anu existed and inspired the Hurro-Hittite tradition regarding their conflict. According to Christopher Metcalf, the motif of a cup-bearer rising to the position of a ruler is likely Mesopotamian in origin, as evidenced by its earlier appearance in a legend about the historical emperor Sargon of Akkad and the legendary king Ur-Zababa. After escaping, Alalu plays no further role in the narrative. The origin of the three primordial kings of the gods, Alalu, Anu and Kumarbi, who after a violent struggle succeeded Anu, is not explained, though in one passage Kumarbi is referred to as Alalu's "seed". Furthermore, according to Mary R. Bachvarova he addresses himself as "Alalu's son" in another myth belonging to the same cycle, Song of Ḫedammu. According to Anna Maria Polvani, the possibility that Alalu was considered Kumarbi's father is also supported by the fact they could occur in sequence among divine witnesses of treaties.

While it is sometimes assumed that Alalu was the father of Anu, similar to his Mesopotamian counterpart, newer scholarship proposes that two lineages of gods appear in the prologue of the Kumarbi Cycle, and therefore that Alalu and Anu should not be regarded as father and son. Gary Beckman notes that the two lines were seemingly only united with the birth of the new generation of gods (Teshub, Tashmishu and others), a result of Kumarbi's castration of Anu, which resulted in a "burden", Anu's seed, being placed inside him. The process is poetically compared to production of bronze from tin and copper.

Alalu's pair among the primeval deities, who usually appear in fixed groups of two or three, was Amizzadu, also spelled Amezzadu. Mary R. Bachvarova identifies this deity as his wife. She is mentioned alongside an unknown deity in the role of parents of another, also unidentified, figure in the Song of Emergence, followed by the parents of Išḫara. According to Mary R. Bachvarova, she's also mentioned in an unknown context by Kumarbi in the Song of Ḫedammu right after he calls himself the son of Alalu. Volkert Haas suggests that Amezzadu and Belili might have been considered analogous to each other. However, Gernot Wilhelm argues that Amizzadu was male, like all other Hurrian primeval deities who did not originate in Mesopotamia.

=== Comparative scholarship ===
Scholars have pointed out the similarities between the Hurrian myth about kingship in Heaven and the succession of Greek gods in Hesiod's Theogony. However, an equivalent of Alalu, a primordial king reigning before the sky god, is absent from Greek mythology.

A similar theogony, compared with the Hurrian myth as early as in 1955, was also described by Philo of Byblos: the first ruler of the gods was Elyon, later replaced by his son Epigeius (identified as the Hellenic Uranus), who in turn was deposed by his own son Elus (identified with Cronos); Elus was then defeated by "Zeus-Demarous" (Hadad). Philo states that Elyon was also known as Hypsistos, and that he was killed by wild animals during a hunt. Hypsistos (Ὕψιστος, "most high") is known as an epithet of various deities in Hellenistic sources.

== Emariote sources ==
Alalu was worshiped in Emar, where he was known under a shortened form of the name, Alal. Texts which mention him were written in Akkadian. John Tracy Thames assumes that he was one of the few deities belonging to the local pantheon who were introduced to it from Mesopotamia, the other example being the Sebitti, but states that it presently cannot be established how they came to be incorporated into local tradition. He was associated with the underworld. The text Emar 370 (line 11) mentions a priest in his service, designated by the sumerogram ^{lú}SANGA. A holder of this office is referenced in the installation rite of a maš’artu as one of the recipients of payments, but Alal himself played no role in this celebration. Emar 452 (lines 41 and 50) refers to his temple (É). Daniel E. Fleming argues that he shared it with the deity Amaza, presumed to be identical with Amizzadu. Most commonly Alal and Amaza appear together in texts from Emar, with only five exceptions with the former appearing alone presently known, three of which are references to his clergy or temple. The temple of Alal possessed an abû, a type of shrine possibly associated with the underworld and ancestor worship and etymologically related to pits used to communicate with underworld deities attested in Hurrian and Mesopotamian sources. Offerings provided for it included honey, oil, ghee, doves, beef, venison, lambs and fruit. Theophoric names invoking Alalu are attested in texts from Emar. One example is Alal-abu.

=== Festivals ===
Alal consistently appears in the eighth position in offering lists from the local zukru festival. However, in contrast with other major members of the local pantheon, such as Dagan, ^{d}NIN.KUR or ^{d}NIN.URTA, he appears in only one hypostasis in texts pertaining to it. John Tracy Thames states that he can be considered a member of what he deems the "first tier" of deities celebrated during it, a designation he uses for the members of the local pantheon who received the most offerings in this context, namely five calves and ten lambs each. However, he stresses that the hierarchical arrangement attested in the zukru texts is unique to this festival and does not reflect a universal hierarchy of deities in Emar.

Alal is also attested in the kissu festival of Dagan. Four offering tables were set during it, with two meant for Dagan, Išḫara and ^{d}NIN.URTA, and two for underworld deities, Alal and Amaza. They are described in this context as "the gods below".
