= Du-Ku =

Du-Ku or dul-kug [du6-ku3] is a Sumerian word for a sacred place.

== Translations ==
According to Wasilewska et al., du-ku translates as "holy hill", "holy mound" [...E-dul-kug... (House which is the holy mound)], or "great mountain" According to the University of Pennsylvania online dictionary of Sumerian and Akkadian languages, du-ku is actually du6-ku3, with du6 being defined as a mound or ruin mound, and ku3 as either ritually pure or shining: it is used in the texts on the Univ. of Oxford site as "shining". There is no mention of nor association with the term "holy", and instead it represents a cultic and cosmic place.

== Divine ==
The location is otherwise alluded to in sacred texts as a specifically identified place of godly judgement.

The hill was the location for ritual offerings to Sumerian god(s). Nungal and the Anunna dwell upon the holy hill in a text written from Gilgamesh.

== See also ==
- Ekur
- Hymn to the E-kur
- Shamash
- Sumerian religion
