= Me (mythology) =

Sumerian name given to the laws of the gods

In Mesopotamian culture, Me (𒈨; Sumerian: me; Akkadian: parṣu) are rituals that were considered to be the property of the gods. During the performance of a Me, the respective deity incarnates itself in the person performing the ritual. The Sumerian religious and cultural life was based on the Me. Thus, the correct practice of these rituals at the temples was essential for the existence of society.

== Mythological origin and nature ==
According to the poem "Enki and the World Order", the Me were originally collected by Enlil and then handed over to the guardianship of Enki, who was to broker them out to the various Sumerian centers, beginning with his own city of Eridu and continuing with Ur, Meluhha, and Dilmun. Here the mes of various places are extolled but are not themselves clearly specified, and they seem to be distinct from the individual responsibilities of each divinity as they are mentioned in conjunction with specific places rather than gods. After a considerable amount of self-glorification on the part of Enki, his daughter Inanna comes before him with a complaint that she has been given short shrift on her divine spheres of influence. Enki does his best to placate her by pointing out those she does in fact possess.

There is no direct connection implied in the mythological cycle between this poem and that which is our main source of information on the mes, "Inanna and Enki: The Transfer of the Arts of Civilization from Eridu to Uruk", but once again Inanna's discontent is a theme. She is the tutelary deity of Uruk and desires to increase its influence and glory by bringing the mes to it from Eridu. She travels to Enki's Eridu shrine, the E-abzu, in her "boat of heaven", and asks the mes from him after he is drunk, whereupon he complies. After she departs with them, he comes to his senses and notices they are missing from their usual place, and on being informed what he did with them attempts to retrieve them. The attempt fails and Inanna triumphantly delivers them to Uruk.

The Sumerian tablets never actually describe what any of the mes look like, but they are clearly represented by physical objects of some sort. Not only are they stored in a prominent location in the E-abzu, but Inanna is able to display them to the people of Uruk after she arrives with them in her boat. Some of them are indeed physical objects such as musical instruments, but many are technologies like "basket weaving" or abstractions like "victory". It is not clarified in the poem how such things can be stored, handled, or displayed.

Not all of the mes are admirable or desirable traits. Alongside functions like "heroship" and "victory" are "the destruction of cities", "falsehood", and "enmity". The Sumerians apparently considered such evils and sins an inevitable part of humanity's experience in life, divinely and inscrutably decreed, and not to be questioned.

== List of mes ==
Although more than one hundred mes appear to be mentioned in the latter myth, and the entire list is given four times, the tablets upon which it is found are so fragmentary that we have only a little over sixty of them. In the order given, they are:

1. ENship
2. Godship
3. The exalted and enduring crown
4. The throne of kingship
5. The exalted sceptre
6. The royal insignia
7. The exalted shrine
8. Shepherdship
9. Kingship
10. Lasting ladyship
11. "Divine lady" (a priestly office)
12. Ishib (a priestly office)
13. Lumah (a priestly office)
14. Guda (a priestly office)
15. Truth
16. Descent into the nether world
17. Ascent from the nether world
18. Kurgarra (a divine eunuch)
19. Girbadara (a eunuch)
20. Sagursag (a eunuch, entertainers related to the cult of Inanna)
21. The battle-standard
22. The flood
23. Weapons (?)
24. Sexual intercourse
25. Prostitution
26. Law (?)
27. Libel (?)
28. Art
29. The cult chamber
30. "hierodule of heaven"
31. Gusilim (a musical instrument)
32. Music
33. Eldership
34. Heroship
35. Power
36. Enmity
37. Straightforwardness
38. The destruction of cities
39. Lamentation
40. Rejoicing of the heart
41. Falsehood
42. Art of metalworking
43. Scribeship
44. Craft of the smith
45. Craft of the leatherworker
46. Craft of the builder
47. Craft of the basket weaver
48. Wisdom
49. Attention
50. Holy purification
51. Fear
52. Terror
53. Strife
54. Peace
55. Weariness
56. Victory
57. Counsel
58. The troubled heart
59. Judgment
60. Decision
61. Lilis (a musical instrument)
62. Ub (a musical instrument)
63. Mesi (a musical instrument)
64. Ala (a musical instrument)
