= Hursag =

Sumerian term

Hursag (Sumerian: 𒄯𒊕 ḫar.sag̃, ḫarsang) is a Sumerian term variously translated as meaning "mountain", "hill", "foothills" or "piedmont". Thorkild Jacobsen extrapolated the translation in his later career to mean literally, "head of the valleys".

Mountains play a certain role in Mesopotamian mythology and Assyro-Babylonian religion, associated with deities such as Anu, Enlil, Enki and Ninhursag.

Hursag is the first word written on tablets found at the ancient Sumerian city of Nippur, dating to the third millennium BCE, Making it possibly the oldest surviving written word in the world.

Some scholars also identify the hursag with an undefined mountain range or strip of raised land outside the plain of Mesopotamia.
