= Inzak =

God of Dilmun

- God of Dilmun
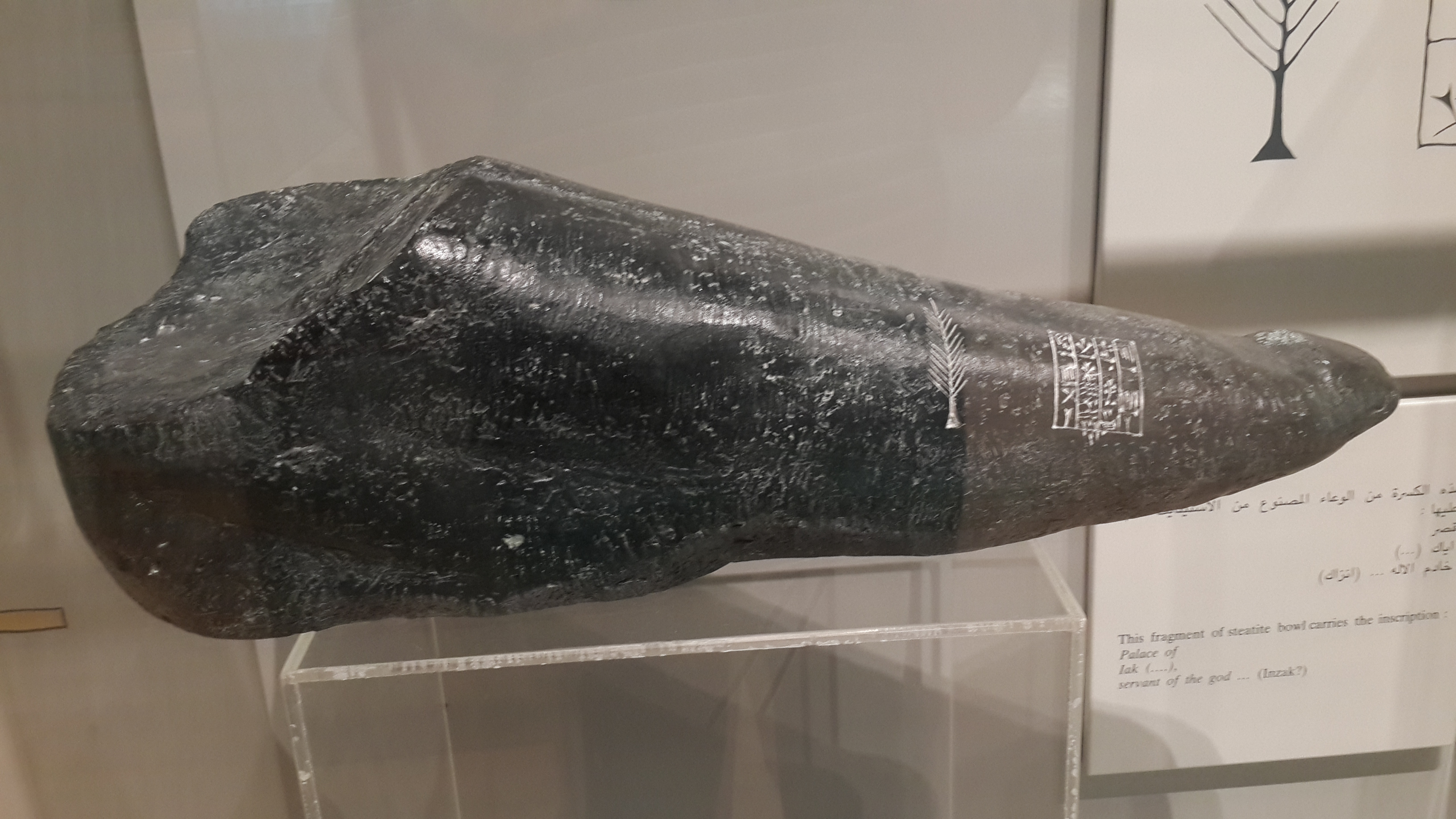
- Replica of the Durand Stone, inscribed with a formula mentioning Inzak. Bahrain National Museum.
- Major cult center: Agarum

Genealogy
- Spouse: Meskilak or ^{d}PA.NI.PA

Inzak (also Enzag, Enzak, Anzak; in older publications romanized as Enshag) was the main god of the pantheon of Dilmun. The precise origin of his name remains a matter of scholarly debate. He might have been associated with date palms. His cult center was Agarum, and he is invoked as the god of this location in inscriptions of Dilmunite kings. His spouse was the goddess locally written Panipa (^{d}PA.NI.PA) as logo gram and written Meskilak in Babylonia. Panipa is now known from both Bahrain and Failaka Island in Kuwait (Laursen et al. 2026).

Evidence of the worship of Inzak is also available from Mesopotamia, where he appears for the first time in an inscription of Gudea of Lagash. He is attested in theophoric names from locations such as Ur, Lagaba and the Sealand. Mesopotamians at some point came to perceive him as analogous to the god Nabu. He also appears as an independent deity in the myth Enki and Ninhursag, in which he is referred to as the "lord of Dilmun". A temple dedicated to Inzak also existed in Susa in Elam. He was either worshiped there alongside Ea and Inshushinak, or functioned as an epithet of the latter god in this city.

== In Dilmun ==
=== Name and character ===
Inzak was one of the two main deities of Dilmun, the other being Meskilak. It has been proposed that he was associated with date palms. The spelling of his name shows a degree of variety, with forms such as Enzag, Enzak and Anzak also attested. The form beginning with the cuneiform sign in predominates in sources from Dilmun itself. The origin of the name is a subject of scholarly dispute. Gianni Marchesi assumes that due to the antiquity of the contacts between Dilmun and Mesopotamian polities, which based on archeological finds go back to the Ubaid period, it is plausible that Inzak had Sumerian origin, and tentatively etymologizes his name as nin-za-ak, "lord of the beads." Piotr Steinkeller also considers this theonym to have Sumerian origin, and assumes it might have originally developed due to Mesopotamian cultural influence spreading to other areas during the so-called "Uruk Expansion." However, the view that Inzak's name was linguistically Sumerian has been criticized by Khaled al-Nashef. Joan Goodnick Westenholz argued that many theonyms attested in Mesopotamian texts which end with the sign ak, including Inzak, Meskilak, Tishpak and Latarak, are unlikely to be Sumerian, and according to her it is implausible to assume it was used in these cases as a genitive ending. Jean-Jacques Glassner notes that while various spellings of Inzak's name attested in Mesopotamian texts might reflect ancient attempts at providing it with an invented etymology, it is unlikely that they reflect the genuine origin of the name.

=== Worship ===
In contrast with Mesopotamian sources, which typically label Inzak as a god of Dilmun, the Dilmunites themselves typically referred to him as the god of Agarum. According to Khaled al-Nashef, the only possible exception is a copy of an Old Babylonian description mentioning "Inzak of Dilmun," which might have originated in this area, on Bahrain or Failaka Island. It is commonly presumed that Agarum was the original location Inzak was worshiped in, and that it corresponds to historical Hagar (modern Hofuf), though the latter assumption is not universally accepted. A different interpretation has been suggested by Stephanie Dalley, who connects this toponym with the Hajar Mountains located in modern Oman and United Arab Emirates. However, Gianni Marchesi notes that she provided no evidence in favor of this proposal, and incorrectly assumed that Inzak's association with copper in an inscription of Gudea means that he was worshiped in Magan (Oman), rather than that Dilmun functioned as a center of copper trade. A third possibility is that Agarum corresponds to Failaka Island, where Inzak was also worshiped. Marchesi notes that the Greek name of the island, Ikaros, might have been a reinterpretation of Agarum based on a Hellenistic folk etymology. This proposal has also been subsequently accepted by Dalley. A single Aramaic inscription from Tell Khazneh on Failaka mentions an otherwise unknown deity named BL ‘KR, who might be a late form of Inzak, with BL being the epithet bēl, "lord," and ‘KR - a toponym analogous to Agarum.

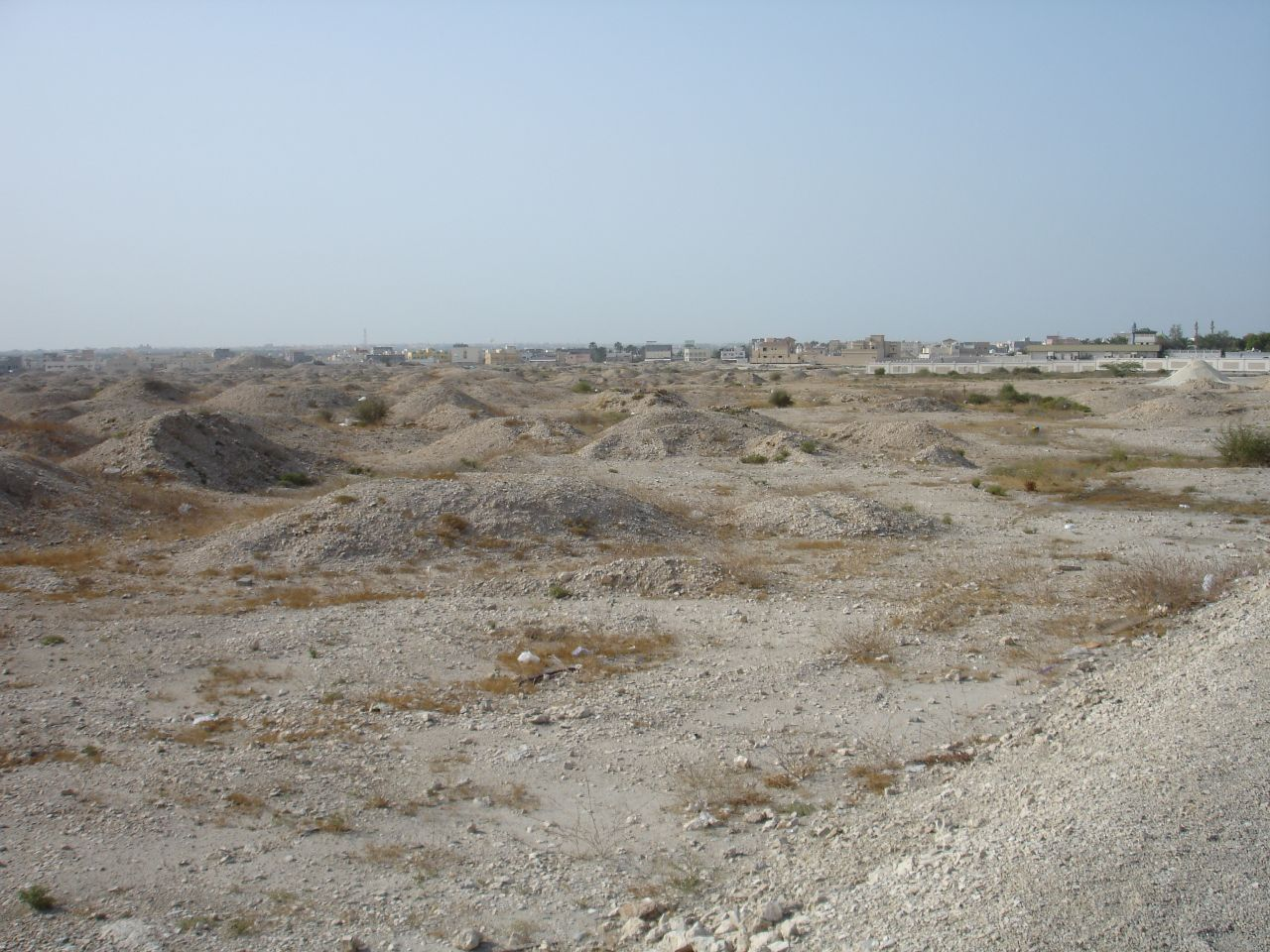
The Dilmunite burial mounds in A'ali.

Inzak is also mentioned in cuneiform inscriptions of Yagli-El, found during recent excavations in A'ali in Bahrain in a structure designated as Royal Mound 8 by archeologists. He is referred to as a deity of Agarum in these texts. A similar inscription of another ruler, Rīmum, was already known earlier from the Durand Stone, and similarly associates him with this toponym. Marchesi suggests that the use of the phrase "servant of Inzak of Agarum" as a title by both of these Dilmunite monarchs might indicate that the local royal ideology was similar to the "theocratic model of kingship" known from the kingdoms of Assyria and Eshnunna in Mesopotamia, where the tutelary god of the state was also worshiped as its ruler, and human kings only acted as his representatives. He also suggests that if his theory is correct, the Dilmunite royal ideology might have influenced the position of later Sabaean mukarribs, who interceded between the ordinary inhabitants of Saba and the main local god, Almaqah.

Mesopotamian texts indicate that a temple dedicated jointly to Enzak and Meskilak which bore the ceremonial Sumerian name Ekarra, "house of the quay," existed in Dilmun. It already appears in Middle Assyrian sources, though they do not list the names of the deities worshiped in it. It is also mentioned in an inscription of Nebuchadnezzar II from Failaka, which according to Andrew R. George indicates Shamash of Larsa was another deity worshiped there. Other documents indicate that a temple of Inzak located on Failaka was referred to as Egalgula ("great palace") or Egal-Inzak ("palace of Inzak").

Various theophoric names invoking Inzak are attested in sources from sites associated with Dilmunite culture, including feminine Baltī-Inzak.

=== Associations with other deities ===
Inzak's wife was the goddess Meskilak. Jeremy Black and Anthony Green proposed that she might have been alternatively viewed as his mother.

A seal inscription from Failaka links Inzak with ^{d}PA.NI.PA, who according to Manfred Krebernik might be the same deity as Meskilak. However, Jean-Jacques Glassner instead assumes they were two separate goddesses who fulfilled the role of Inzak's partner in two separate locations. Gianni Marchesi assumes that ^{d}PA.NI.PA, whose name he renders phonetically as Panipa, was Inzak's spouse on Failaka. A seal from this location which might have belonged to a member of local clergy dedicated to her refers to her as "she who knows the seed of Inzak of Agarum."

A possible association between Inzak and Enki is attested in sources from Dilmun, though it possible that the Mesopotamian god's name was simply used to represent that of the local one, and he was not worshiped himself in this area. Andrew R. George notes that the presumed association between Enki and Inzak matches the Mesopotamian sources, in which the latter deity was sometimes linked to Dilmun. It is possible that an analogous connection existed between Meskilak and Enki's spouse Damgalnunna.

== In Mesopotamia ==
Inzak is also attested in sources from Mesopotamia. The oldest example occurs on one of the Gudea cylinders, where his name is rendered as ^{d}Nin-zà-ga, "lord of the sanctuary." The inscription states that the Mesopotamian god Ningirsu instructed him to provide Gudea with a large amount of copper during the construction of Eninnu.

In two theophoric names from Ur the variant spelling Nininzak can be found. One of them belonged to Idin-Nininzak, who was one of the alik Tilmun, "Dilmun traders." It is assumed he was a Dilmunite himself. The other name is not fully preserved. Spelling the name as Nininzak, literally "lord Inzak," might reflect an attempt at assimilating the god into the local pantheon. A person from Dilmun bearing the name Inzak-gamil is attested in a text from Lagaba from the reign of Samsu-iluna. A variant spelling of Inzak's name, Anzak, appears in theophoric names present in documents from the archive of the First Sealand dynasty, such as Anzak-gamil, Anzak-iddina, Anzak-rabi, Anzak-rabiat and Arad-Anzakti. Ran Zadok presumed they belonged to Dilmunites. Stephanie Dalley instead argues that since the names are linguistically Akkadian aside from the theonym invoked in them, it is possible Inzak was incorporated into the local pantheon of the Sealand and had a hitherto unidentified cult center somewhere in Mesopotamia, though she also points out he appears to be absent from known offering lists.

Inzak, paired with Meskilak and like her referred to as one of the "deities of Dilmun," appears in greeting formulas of the letters exchanged between Ili-liya, apparently a nickname of Enlil-kidinnī, the governor of Nippur during the reigns of Kassite kings Burnaburiash II and Kurigalzu II, and a certain Ilī-ippašra. It has been proposed the latter originated in Mesopotamia, but at some point came to live in Dilmun instead. Both of the Dilmunite deities are invoked to guard the well-being of the recipient.

In the incantation series Šurpu, Inzak appears in a passage which begins with the invocation of the god ^{d}LUGAL.A.AB.BA (Lugala'abba), the "king of the sea." The full sequence of deities mentioned in it consists of Lugala'abba, Lugalidda, Laguda, Inzak and Meskilak.

=== Associations with other deities ===
In the late god list An = Anu ša amēli Inzak is equated with Nabu. A text in which Inzak's name (spelled as Enzag) is used to represent Nabu in a context in which other major gods are mentioned under alternate or cryptographic names is also known. According to Manfred Krebernik this association might also implicitly indicate that Meskilak was equated with Nabu's wife Tashmetum.

A single bilingual Sumero-Akkadian hymn dedicated to Nanaya considers Inzak and Meskilak to be two names of a single male deity in this context identified with Nabu, and lists a goddess named Šuluḫḫītum as his spouse.

Stephanie Dalley maintains that references to Inzak being treated as a female deity analogous to Ninsianna are also known.

=== Mythology ===
Inzak appears in the myth Enki and Ninhursag. The writing of his name used by the Mesopotamian compilers of this text is rendered by modern authors as Enzag or Ensag. Older publications use the form Enshag. This reinterpretation of the theonym can be translated as "lord of the side." Other possible explanations are "lord who makes beautiful," "lord who brings beauty" or "sweet lord." In this composition he is one of the eight deities created to soothe the pains experienced by Enki, the other seven being Abu, Ninsikila (Meskilak), Ningiritud (Ningirida), Ninkasi, Nanshe, Azimua and Ninti. He is the last of them to be mentioned, and his appearance is preceded by Enki declaring his flank hurts him. After being healed, the latter god assigns roles to the newborn deities, with Inzak being declared the "lord of Dilmun."

== In Elam ==
Inzak was also worshiped in Susa in the west of Elam. Khaled al-Nashef has argued that it cannot be established if he was introduced there from Dilmun or if he was originally worshiped in this area, and rules out the possibility that he reached Elam through Mesopotamian intermediaries. Theophoric names invoking Inzak are attested in sources from Susa from the Old Babylonian period, but according to Ran Zadok they might belong to people from Dilmun, rather than local inhabitants. Examples listed by Daniel T. Potts and Soren Blau include Inzaki, Kūn-Inzaki, Idin-Inzaku and Watar-Inzak, additionally a man bearing a linguistically Amorite name, Milki-El, is identified as a son of a Dilmunite named Tem-Enzag.

In Elam, Inzak was associated with Inshushinak and Ea. A temple in Susa dated to the early second millennium BCE and a paved walkway from the same time were apparently dedicated jointly to these gods. It is known from an inscription mentioning the kings Tempti-Agun and Kutir-Nahhunte, preserved as a copy from the reign of Shilhak-Inshushinak. It is sometimes proposed that in Elam Inshushinak, Inzak and Ea were equated, and the latter two were understood as epithets of the local god.
