= Meskilak =

Goddess of Dilmun

- Goddess of Dilmun

Genealogy
- Spouse: Inzak

Meskilak or Mesikila was one of the two main deities worshiped in Dilmun. The other well attested member of the pantheon of this area was Inzak, commonly assumed to be her spouse. The origin of her name is a subject of scholarly dispute. She is also attested in texts from Mesopotamia, where her name was reinterpreted as Ninsikila. A different deity also named Ninsikila was the spouse of Lisin, and might have started to be viewed as a goddess rather than a god due to the similarity of the names. Under her Mesopotamian name Meskilak appears in the myths Enki and Ninhursag and Enki and the World Order, in which she is associated with Dilmun.

== In Dilmun ==
It is assumed Meskilak was one of the two main deities of Dilmun, the second one being Inzak, often interpreted as her spouse by researchers. An alternative proposal is that he was her son. An attested variant of Meskilak's name is Mesikila. The origin of the theonym Meskilak is not certain, and various proposals have been made by researchers. According to Gianni Marchesi, due to the fact that contacts between Mesopotamia and Dilmun go back to the Ubaid period it is plausible to assume that it was Sumerian in origin and can be translated as me-sikil-ak, "she of the pure me." Piotr Steinkeller also considers it possible that her name came from this language, and assumes that she might have developed in the Uruk period, during the "Uruk expansion." Jean-Jacques Glassner instead argues that the attested Mesopotamian explanations of her name represent ancient examples of word play or reinterpretations meant to fit local theology, and do not necessarily represent their actual etymology. According to Joan Goodnick Westenholz, the sign ak in Meskilak's name, while sometimes interpreted as a genitive ending, is more likely to be an indication of non-Sumerian origin, as in the cases of Tishpak, Inzak or Latarak. Proposed Sumerian etymologies of her name were also rejected by Khaled Nashef.

A temple dedicated to Meskilak and Inzak, the Ekarra (Sumerian: "house, exalted quay") existed somewhere in Dilmun according to Mesopotamian sources, including a list of temples and other texts. It is mentioned in an inscription from Failaka Island attributed to the Neo-Babylonian king Nebuchadnezzar II, according to which the Mesopotamian god Shamash (from Larsa), was worshiped there as well.

=== Meskilak and ^{d}PA.NI.PA ===
According to Manfred Krebernik, the deity ^{d}PA.NI.PA, who is attested in texts from Failaka Island, might be analogous to Meskilak. The reading of her name is not certain, though possibilities such as ^{d}Pa-li-ḫat as well as a phonetic reading, Panipa, have been proposed. Jean-Jacques Glassner assumes she and Meskilak were two separate goddesses who fulfilled the same role in relation to Inzak in two separate locations. ^{d}PA.NI.PA is attested in a theophoric name inscribed on a lapis lazuli seal from Failaka, Lā'û-la-^{d}PA.NI.PA, "truly a skillful one is ^{d}PA.NI.PA," which most likely belonged to a Dilmunite princess. Another similar object refers to her as "she who knows the seed of Inzak of Agarum." Meskilak herself (or under her primary name, if the identification with ^{d}PA.NI.PA is accepted) is present in sources from this island too.

== In Mesopotamia ==
Meskilak appears in sources from Mesopotamia as well. In texts from this area, her name could be transcribed as Ninsikila, written ^{d}Nin-sikil-a ("the lady of the pure") on one of the Gudea cylinders and ^{d}Nin-sikil-la in the myth Enki and Ninhursag. A deity with a homophonous name, Ninsikila, was the spouse of the Mesopotamian goddess Lisin, and it is possible that the similarity of his name to Meskilak's was in part responsible for the fact he later came to be viewed as a goddess.

An inscription on one of the cylinders of Gudea is the oldest known reference to Meskilak in a Mesopotamian source. It states that at the orders of the Mesopotamian god Ningirsu she delivered three types of wood - ḫalub, ebony and "wood of the sea" (giš-ab-ba-bi) to the aforementioned ruler for the construction of Eninnu.

The deities of Dilmun, Meskilak and Inzak, are referenced in greeting formulas in letters exchanged between Enlil-kidinnī (also known under the name Ili-liya), the governor of Nippur during the reigns of Kassite kings Burnaburiash II and Kurigalzu II, and Ilī-ippašra, possibly a Mesopotamian who came to reside in Dilmun. Both of the deities are asked to guard the life of the inhabitant of Nippur in these documents.

Meskilak also appears in the incantation series Šurpu, where she is one of the deities invoked in a passage which begins with the invocation of the god Lugala'abba, the "lord of the sea," and ends with her. The other three deities present in it are Lugalidda, Laguda and Inzak.

=== Associations with other deities ===
Manfred Krebernik argues that the equation between Inzak and Nabu in the late god list An = Anu ša amēli might indicate an analogous equation between their wives, Meskilak and Tashmetum. A bilingual hymn treats Meskilak as a male deity identical with Inzak, and identifies him as the counterpart of Nabu and spouse of a goddess named Šuluḫḫītum. It has been proposed that she might have originated as an Akkadian counterpart of Meskilak based on the reinterpretation of her name as Ninsikila, to be understood as "the one related to purification rites," though this view is not universally accepted. The name Nintilmun, "lady of Dilmun," mentioned in the Inanna section of the god list An = Anum, might also plausibly refer to Meskilak. A connection between her and Laḫamun is even more uncertain. The latter deity occurs in god lists as an alternate name of Zarpanit explained as originating in Dilmun.

It is possible that Dilmunites themselves associated Meskilak with Damgalnunna, analogously to the connection between their respective spouses Enki and Inzak.

=== Mythology ===
Meskilak appears in the myth Enki and Ninhursag under the name Ninsikila. She is introduced in the beginning of the narrative as the goddess of Dilmun, and asks Enki for help, as the land she rules over, which he assigned to her, is a desert. While it is sometimes assumed that she is synonymous with Ninhursag in this passage, this interpretation is not universally accepted. Enki promises to provide Dilmun with clear water, and subsequently does so, which is most likely meant to highlight his role as a deity associated with water. The early proposal that Dilmun is presented as a paradise in this section of the myth, initially suggested by Samuel Noah Kramer in the 1940s, is no longer considered plausible. Gianni Marchesi notes that a variant of the text known from Ur and dated to the period of Rim-Sîn I's reign emphasizes Dilmun's character as a trade hub through an additional passage in which Enki blesses Meskilak and states that her land will be the destination for precious resources from various distant locations, including Tukriš, Magan, Meluhha, Elam and Marhasi. It has been argued that the toponyms listed reflect the "contemporary commercial horizons of Babylonia." The entire section of the myth focused on Meskilak might have originally been a separate narrative.

A goddess also named Ninsikila subsequently reappears as one of the eight deities who are meant to relive Enki from the pains he was experiencing. According to Dina Katz, it is possible that a different deity than Meskilak was meant in this case, perhaps Ninsiki, who was associated with wool who appears alongside Lahar in god lists, though the copy of Enki and Ninhursag from Nippur according to her "does create the impression that the two [Ninsikilas] are the same goddess." Manfred Krebernik also assumes that the latter Ninsikila is Meskilak. The other seven deities mentioned in the same passage are Abu, Ningirida, Ninkasi, Nanshe, Azimua, Ninti and Inzak. The name Ninsikila is reinterpreted as "lady bearing hair" to reflect the problem she was meant to deal with. After Enki is healed, all the deities are assigned new roles, and she is put in charge of Magan. This toponym referred to the area corresponding to modern Oman in the third and second millennium BCE, though in the first millennium BCE it instead came to designate Egypt, with Qadû becoming the new name for the former place.

Meskilak also appears as Ninsikila in the myth Enki and the World Order, in which the eponymous god entrusts her with maintaining Dilmun. According to Dina Katz, this passage might have influenced the role she plays in the beginning of the myth Enki and Ninhursag.
