= Samānu =

Samānu, from sāmu or “red,” disease, inscribed sa-ma-ná, was an ancient Mesopotamian name for an affliction of humans, animals and plants alike and the incantation used to cure it: SAG.NIM.NIM TI.LA. It was known as the “hand of Gula.” Extant in Sumerian copies from the Old Akkadian (Note: 6 NT 145, NBC 11106, published as YOS 11 73.) and Ur III eras (Note: Tablet AO 11276.) (Note: Tablet HS 1555+1587, from Nippur.) and with Akkadian translations from neo-Assyrian and neo-Babylonian periods, it is one of the few texts which is known in its various stages of evolution.

== The text ==
In its earliest incarnations, the incantation seems to be used for the aversion of all folk-magic illnesses of a démon rouge, from a virgin’s menstrual blood and inflammation and bleeding of the hoof to color of the evening sky. A single lexical work describes it as “a severe skin disease in humans, in sheep, and a weevil.” It has also, disputably, been identified as the ergot or “rust” on grain and an insect or tick bite, due to its proximity to the incantation zú-muš ti-la, “to cure snake-bite,” in the Exorcists Manual where it is listed in the curriculum of the ašipu, “exorcist.” The earliest incantations described the disorder anthropomorphically, “mouth of a lion,” “claws of an eagle,” “tail of a scorpion,” and so on and entreated Assaluḫi, the son of Enki, to provide divine relief.

Samānu came down from the mountains; samānu crossed the river. Samānu poured like di’u like water down over the black-headed people. It afflicted the ox on his horn, the donkey on his hoof, the young man on his thigh, the young woman on her breastbone, the suckling infant on the muscles of his neck.

In later inscriptions, such as the lexical list ugu-mu, it is a soft-tissue disorder, possibly cellulitis, and is described “If the nature of the sore is that it is red, hot, swollen, and flows, [it is called] samānu,” “If the nature of the sore is that it is red (and) the person is continually feverish and continually vomits, [it is called] samānu,” “If samānu afflicts a person’s head (and) it is reddish (and) it retracts and calms down (but) afterward it increases (again)…” and “If there is (for) a person either red samānu or black or yellow/green or [white] or wheals or prick from a thorn… If it continually produces blood and pus…”
