= Latarak =

Mesopotamian god

- Protective god, guardian of doorways
- Major cult center: possibly Bāb-Lātarāk
- Weapons: whip
- Animals: lion

Latarak (Lātarāk) was a Mesopotamian god. He was most likely depicted as a figure clad in a lion's skin, or perhaps as a lion-like monster. He was regarded as a protective deity, invoked to defend doorways and ward off diseases. He was closely associated with Lulal, though the relationship between them varies between available primary sources, with some equating them and other treating them as a pair of similar, but not identical deities. He was worshiped in Mesopotamian cities such as Uruk, Nippur and Assur. It is also possible that a city named after him, Bāb-Lātarāk, existed, but the reading of this toponym is not certain. Outside Mesopotamia, he is attested in religious texts from Emar and in a trilingual god list from Ugarit.

== Name and character ==
According to Wilfred G. Lambert, Latarak's name should be interpreted as a negated infinitive form of an unidentified Akkadian word, analogously to Lagamal's. A single unpublished commentary on the Weidner god list explains it as a combination of lā, "not", and tarāku, "to switch a whip", additionally glossed as naṭû, "to beat", but according to Frans Wiggermann this ancient attempt at etymologizing it is grammatically incorrect. While the suffix -ak could be a genitive ending in Sumerian, according to Joan Goodnick Westenholz Latarak's name is considered to be one of the cases where such an interpretation is implausible, similarly to theonyms such as Tishpak, Inzak and Meskilak. Lexical lists explain Latarak's name as urgulû, "lion", and it has been suggested that he possessed leonine features. It is assumed that he can be identified with a figure clad in lion garb known from Mesopotamian art. The lion skin is most likely meant to designate him as a deity responsible for subduing evil. Depictions of the figure in lion garb show him holding a whip. An alternative proposal is that Latarak was depicted as a lion-like monster, rather than as a man in a lion's skin.

It is assumed that Latarak was associated with the steppe, though this interpretation is not universally accepted. An Akkadian hymn to Shamash known from two copies, one from Assur and another from Hattusa, refers to him as the "master of the open country" (šar ṣe-ri-im). A fragmentary Akkadian hymn to Latarak highlights his association with domestic animals. He is also attested as a divine protector of doorways and as a god capable of warding off diseases. While attempts have been made to classify him as one of the deities representing deified ancestors, similar to Yakrub-El or Itūr-Mēr, according to Jack M. Sasson this view is incorrect.

== Associations with other deities ==
Latarak was closely associated with Lulal. Wilfred G. Lambert suggested that it is possible the former was a secondary name of the latter. In Emar, Lulal's name was used as a logographic representation of Latarak's. It is possible a further similar example is present in a single Old Babylonian inscription. Frans Wiggermann notes that these two gods were commonly equated, but they are also attested as a pair of two distinct figures sharing similar characteristics. According to Manfred Krebernik, they could be viewed as twin brothers. They appear separately in astronomical and texts and apotropaic rituals. A fragmentary Neo-Babylonian text (CT 51 102) with instructions for an unidentified ritual prescribes the preparation of a pair of figures representing Latarak and Lulal. A late tradition explains the pair as Sin and Nergal in astronomical context. Latarak could also be paired with Lugaledinna, a deity according to Lambert analogous to Lulal, and they appear together in lists of asakku, in which they could be grouped with figures such as Muḫra, Šulak or Lugala'abba. They also appear together in the incantation series Maqlû, which contains the formula "Lugaledinna (and) Latarak are my chest" (tablet VI, line 7).

It has been suggested that Latarak belonged to the circle of deities associated with Ishtar. References to him as the gatekeeper of Gula are also known, and might reflect their shared ability to ward off illnesses.

Emmanuel Laroche proposed that the name of Iltara (Eltara), one of the Hurrian "primeval gods", was derived from Latarak. However, the modern consensus is that this god is most likely a reflection of Ugaritic El, with -tara being an amplifying suffix in this case.

== Worship ==
Latarak was worshiped in Uruk, and an instance of transfer of his cult from this city to Kish in relation to the move of an Urukean family to this northern city in the Old Babylonian period is known. In Nippur he is attested in two theophoric names from the Kassite period. Additionally, a lexical list from this city from the Old Babylonian period mentions a toponym which might be read as either Bāb-Lātarāk or Ka-Lulal, possibly a cult center of the deity it was named after. A Middle Babylonian administrative document (TMH NF 5 29) mentions that a certain Amurru-nāṣir, identified as a physician (asû), received barley needed for an office related to the worship of Latarak, parṣu.

A single attestation of Latarak is available from a document from Mari describing a celebration dedicated to Ishtar. It states that during a ritual taking place in the morning he was seated to the left of this goddess alongside deities collectively referred to as Dingirgubbû.

Latarak was also worshiped in Assyria, with attestations available from as late as the Neo-Assyrian period, though his cult was of minor importance in this area. A shrine dedicated jointly to him and Mīšaru, known under the ceremonial name Ursaĝsumkudda, existed in Assur in the lobby of Ešarra, the temple complex of Ashur. It is also possible that a Neo-Assyrian letter alludes to a ritual during which Latarak was invoked to chase away Lamashtu.

An incantation from the Bīt mēseri corpus indicates that figures of Latarak and Lulal were placed in gates to prevent evil from entering. Šēp lemutti prescribes the preparation of two figures of Latarak and decorating them with "black paste", an unidentified substance represented by the cuneiform signs IM.GI_{6}. It has been noted that darker pigments were typically used for figures of gods, with other examples attested in similar sources including Meslamtaea, Sebitti and Narundi, and lighter for these representing other supernatural beings, such as mythical hybrids or apkallu. Similarly, a section of the text labeled as An Address of Marduk to the Demons by Wilfred G. Lambert (K 4656 + K 9741) prescribes stationing him in the door alongside a number of other deities, including Lulal, Tishpak, the Sebitti and Ishtar.

=== Outside Mesopotamia ===
Latarak was worshiped in Emar, where a single document mentions him among the deities associated with the city of Tuttul. A ritual calendar mentions a three day long procession held in his honor after the new moon ending the month Abî. A gate named after him, as well as a "great highway" dedicated to him (KASKAL-nu GAL ša ^{d}LÚ.LÀL), possibly a road leading to it, are also attested.

In a trilingual edition of the Weidner god list from Ugarit, Latarak corresponds to Šarrani in the Hurrian column and to an only partially preserved theonym, restored as Nid[a-] by Aaron Tugendhaft, in the Ugaritic one. However, this text most likely does not reflect religious practice of the period. Furthermore, many entries in the latter two columns are otherwise unattested.
