= Lisin =

Mesopotamian deity

- Major cult center: ĜEŠ.GI (possibly Abu Salabikh), possibly Adab and Kesh
- Gender: initially female, later male

Genealogy
- Parents: Šulpae (father); Ninhursag (mother)
- Siblings: Ashgi
- Spouse: Ninsikila
- Children: KU-anna, KU-kita, KU-ta-abzu, KU-kita-abzu, Irḫangul, Kituš-Keš, Lalanna, Urnunta-ea

Lisin was a Mesopotamian deity initially regarded as a goddess and addressed as ama, "mother," who later came to be regarded as a god and developed an association with fire. The name was also applied to a star associated with Nabu, presumed to correspond to Antares. Lisin's spouse was Ninsikila, whose gender also changed between periods. It was believed that they had eight children. The initial cult center of Lisin is uncertain, with locations such as Abu Salabikh, Adab and Kesh being often proposed. She is attested in texts from various cities, including Umma, Lagash, Nippur and Meturan. Only a single literary text focused on Lisin is known, a lament in which she mourns the death of one of her sons, for which she blames her mother Ninhursag. Both female and male version of Lisin also appears in other similar texts.

== Name and character ==
Lisin's name was written as ^{d}li_{9}-si_{4} (𒀭𒉈𒋜) in cuneiform. It is sometimes romanized as Lisi instead. The reading with n as the final consonant is based on genitive forms in which the final sign is na, such as the theophoric name Geme-Lisina. Due to uncertainties about sign values, the spelling ^{d}NE.GÙN was used in early Assyriological literature, but it was possible to establish the correct reading based on ancient lexical lists providing pronunciation glosses. The meaning of the name is unknown. Lisin's character also remains poorly known.

=== Gender ===
Lisin is addressed as ama, "mother," in one of the Early Dynastic Zame Hymns. Authors such as Jeremy Black, Anthony Green and Gebhard J. Selz, relying on this fact, describe her as a "mother goddess". However, according to Manfred Krebernik and Jan Lisman this epithet does not necessarily indicate maternal characteristics. According to Joan Goodnick Westenholz, it should be understood as a title highlighting the protective nature of goddesses regarded as tutelary deities of specific cities. (Note: She also suggested that Early Dynastic scribes might have used titles such as ama and lamma as an inconsistent way of specifying the gender of goddesses. Julia M. Asher-Greve in a general overview of the use of the epithets "mother" and "father" in Mesopotamian texts states that they often simply designated major members of the pantheon, and in some cases might reflect the authority of a given goddess, rather than association with motherhood.)

Despite ama being her most common epithet, Lisin came to be viewed as a male deity in later periods. In texts postdating the Old Babylonian period, and uncommonly also earlier, the genders of Lisin and her spouse Ninsikila were switched around, and in the god list An = Anum the former is male and the latter female. The fact that in Old Babylonian god lists Lisin precedes Ninsikila might have influenced the reinterpretation of their gender. Furthermore, it is also possible the existence of a Dilmunite goddess homophonous, but not identical, with Ninsikila, whose original name was Meskilak but who came to be referred to as Ninsikila in Mesopotamia, was a factor.

According to Westenholz, the gender of Lisin did not change in laments, in which she continued to be addressed as a female deity even in later periods. However, Paul Delnero states that a fragment of a single lament in which Lisin is male is known. Lisin is also treated as a female deity in Udug Hul, a corpus of incantations which remained in circulation until the end of the use of cuneiform in Mesopotamia.

=== Later reinterpretation ===
In various esoteric texts, an association between Lisin and fire and burning developed. An explanatory text, referred to as The Weapon Name Exposition by Alasdair Livingstone, includes an invented Akkadian etymology of Lisin's name. The deity, in this case treated as male, is described as "he who burns with fire" and "he who burns on an offering", relying on the use of the first sign of the name to write the verb qalû, "to burn," and the second one to represent the nouns izi and išātu, "fire". A third explanation of the name provided, "the handsome one, the burning one", relies on explaining the first sign as banû, "to be beautiful", and on treating izi, the value previously established for the second sign, as analogous to qalû.

According to Markham J. Geller, an Udug Hul incantation in which Lisin, in this text referred to as a goddess, appears when ingredients needed for the ritual are cooked might also depend on the association with fire. The fact that an esoteric text which equates deities with various materials and objects assigns "white fumes" to Lisin is also presumed to depend on a similar invented etymology. In incantations, Lisin could be associated with a variety of other materials, including hūlu and kibrītu, both presumed to be minerals, horn of the gazelle, and medicinal plants ninû, azupiru, and sahlû.

=== In Mesopotamian astronomy ===
In the first millennium BCE in Mesopotamian astronomy Lisin's name came to be used as the designation of the star known today as Antares (α Scorpionis). Based on the fact that the star could also be referred to as "the breast of the scorpion" (^{mul}GABA GIR_{2}.TAB), Gabriella Spada argues that Lisin herself was at some point associated with scorpions. The compendium MUL.APIN states that praying to the star Lisin when it was visible in the sky could secure good luck as long as all members of the petitioner's household were woken up to partake. According to Hermann Hunger, despite the origin of its name, the star was associated with Nabu.

== Associations with other deities ==
Ninhursag was regarded as Lisin's mother, and Šulpae as her father. Her brother was Ashgi. However, for unknown reasons in the Old Babylonian forerunner of the god list An = Anum Lisin appears separately from the section dedicated to Ninhursag and her family.

Lisin's spouse was Ninsikila, and eight children are assigned to them in the god list An = Anum: KU-anna, KU-kita, KU-ta-abzu, KU-kita-abzu (reading of the first sign in all four names is uncertain), Irḫangul, Kituš-Keš, Lalanna (or Lulalanna) and Urnunta-ea. Urnunta-ea is also attested as a daughter of Bau and Ningirsu in early sources from Lagash, which might indicate a degree of interchange between the local pantheons of this state and Kesh.

In literary texts portraying her as a mourning goddess, Lisin could be equated with other similar deities. For example, Antoine Cavigneaux and Manfred Krebernik note the existence of an eršemma composition which implicitly identifies her with Ninhursag, Dingirmaḫ and Ninmug. Mark E. Cohen proposed that Lisin and Dingirmaḫ were already equated in the Early Dynastic period, and that the correspondence between them was responsible for the apparent interest in the Kesh temple hymn among the scribes from Abu Salabikh. (Note: A copy has been discovered in the same room as multiple exemplars of the Zame Hymns, Abu Salabikh god list, the myths Lugalbanda and Ninsumuna and Ezina and her children, and several UG.GAL.NUN texts. It is possible that it served as the scriptorium of a temple.) Dina Katz additionally notes similarities in the portrayal of Lisin and Duttur as mourning goddesses.

The male form of Lisin could be sometimes treated as comparable to Ninurta, or alternatively as one of the members of his entourage or one of his deified weapons.

In ritual texts from the first millennium BCE, Lisin appears as a member of the household of Nanaya of Euršaba alongside deities such as Qibi-dumqi and Uṣur-amāssu.

== Worship ==
Oldest known attestations of Lisin have been identified in texts from Abu Salabikh. It is assumed that her position in the Mesopotamian pantheon was initially high. However, references to worship of her postdating the third millennium BCE are uncommon, and it is presumed that she lost her initial importance at some point in the Old Babylonian period or earlier.

=== ĜEŠ.GI ===
Piotr Michalowski states that the main cult center of Lisin is unknown, but Manfred Krebernik and Jan Lisman note that in the final, seventieth section of the Zame Hymns from Early Dynastic Abu Salabikh, she is designated as the tutelary goddess of ĜEŠ.GI. The reading Ĝišgi has been proposed for this toponym. It is referred to with the epithet "good place" (ki du_{10}).

Mark E. Cohen proposed identifying ĜEŠ.GI with Abu Salabikh. He argued that it can be assumed Lisin was the city goddess of this site in the Early Dynastic period based on her position as the final deity mentioned in the Zame Hymns. He also noted that the toponym ĜEŠ.GI is otherwise chiefly attested in texts from Nippur, which would match Abu Salabikh's location. (Note: It also occurs in Old Babylonian compositions describing the revolt against Naram-Sin.) It lies 12 kilometers to the northwest of Nippur, and it is possible in antiquity the two sites were linked by a canal. Cohen also notes that excavations at Abu Salabikh indicate that it was abandoned before the Old Babylonian period, when Lisin evidently no longer had a specific cult center. The identification of ĜEŠ.GI as Abu Salabikh is also supported by Manfred Krebernik and Jan Lisman. They propose that the Zame Hymns were originally composed to commemorate the foundation of a temple dedicated to Lisin, and later were performed during ceremonies commemorating this event. They speculate an annual or otherwise cyclical celebration might have taken place in her honor. However, the identification of Abu Salabikh as ĜEŠ.GI is not universally accepted.

=== Adab and Kesh ===
Authors such as Piotr Michalowski, Jeremy Black and Anthony Green assume that Adab and Kesh were among Lisin's primary cult centers. According to Marcos Such-Gutiérrez attestations of Lisin from Adab are limited to theophoric names from the Early Dynastic and Old Akkadian periods, such as Ur-Lisin (attested in both periods) and Gan-Lisin (attested only in the latter). It has also been argued that the fact one of her children, Kituš-Keš ("Kesh is the residence"), was named after Kesh confirms the assumption she was associated with it. The fact a month named after Lisin, ^{iti}ezem-^{d}li_{9}-si_{4}, is attested in texts from Tell al-Wilayah has been used to argue this site corresponds to Kesh.

=== Umma ===
In the local calendar of Umma, the third month, iti ^{d}Li_{9}-si_{4}, was named after Lisin, but there is no indication that any festival dedicated to her took place at this time, which might mean it was borrowed from the calendar of another city. A temple dedicated to her is mentioned in one of the inscriptions of Lugalzagesi. The Canonical Temple List, most likely composed in the second half of the Kassite period, as well as other sources, also mention the existence of a temple of Lisin, Euršaba (possibly to be translated from Sumerian as "house, oracle of the heart"), which according to Andrew R. George was located in Umma. (Note: It has to be distinguished with the better attested Euršaba in Borsippa, which was dedicated to Nanaya, rather than Lisin.) Texts from Umma also document offerings made to Lisin. Furthermore, at one point a man bearing the theophoric name Ur-Lisin served as the governor of this city.

=== Lagash ===
Early texts from the state of Lagash mention the itu ezem ^{d}Li_{8}-si_{4}(-na), "month of the festival of Lisin". In the Early Dynastic period it was the seventh or eighth month in the local calendar, and took place five or six months before the harvest, but later on it became the third month, and occurred eight months before the harvest season. As of 1993, no information was available on the celebrations which took place during it, with the exception of a reference to offerings on the day of the new moon in Urub, which did not involve the goddess in mention. In a more recent publication, Bram Jagersma states that a festival dedicated to Lisin took place at this time in the Ur III period, but no details are provided in known texts, and while he assumes it might have involved funerary offerings, no primary sources directly supporting this theory are available.

Other evidence for the worship of Lisin in Lagash includes a single text mentions a water reservoir at the temple dedicated to her, whose precise location remains unknown, and theophoric names such as Ur-Lisin and ḪE-Lisin (reading of the first sign uncertain). Gebhard J. Selz notes that the small number of attestations of Lisin from Lagash is unexpected and contrasts with her apparent importance implied by the month name, the existence of a location associated with her, and other evidence.

=== Nippur ===
Lisin is attested in an offering list from Nippur from the end of the Isin-Larsa period and in theophoric names such as Lisin-ummi and Lisin-bani. She is also present in the Nippur god list, in which she occurs between Uttu and Alammuš. In a different god list, referred to as "shorter An = Anum" (Note: The name reflects the fact that it starts with a shortened version of the sequence of deities opening its better known namesake.) and most likely composed in the Kassite period, Lisin is described as the divine "mayor" (EN URU.MU, bēl āli-ia_{5}) of Nippur. Ryan D. Winters assumes that this attestation reflects the portrayals of Lisin as an attendant or deified weapon of Ninurta.

=== Other cities ===
It has been suggested that in early periods Lisin was worshiped in Sirara.

In Larsa, a certain Ṣālilum dedicated a diorite bowl for the life of Rim-Sîn I to Lisin and Ninsikila, according to Douglas Frayne with former to be interpreted as a god and the latter as a goddess. However, according to Gabriella Spada it is also possible that Lisin is female in this text. She also appears in a legal text from the reign of the same king which might be an example of a so-called "temple loan", as it presents her as the creditor who lent a certain amount of silver to two people.

Texts focused on Lisin have also been found during the excavations in Meturan, and according to Antoine Cavigneaux and Farouk Al-Rawi might indicate the existence of a local cult dedicated to her in this city in the Old Babylonian period. She is attested in theophoric names from this site, Lisina-akkam and Lu-Lisina, with the latter attested on a seal with an inscription documenting the owner's personal devotion to her.

The copyist of one of the surviving examples of the god list Anšar = Anum, Itti-Marduk-balātu, mentioned Lisin in its colophon as one of the deities he was devoted to, alongside Sin and Nanaya. This text has been dated to the Neo-Babylonian period, and likely comes from Sippar.

A possible late reference to Lisin occurs in a ritual text from Babylon which lists various deities worshiped alongside Nanaya in her temple Euršaba who accompanied her during a journey to Kish. The tablets reflect late Babylonian conventions, and might come from either the Hellenistic or Arsacid period.

== Mythology ==
Only a single literary composition focused on Lisin is known. It is referred to as Lisin A in Assyriological literature, following the Electronic Text Corpus of Sumerian Literature naming system. It was most likely composed in the Old Babylonian period, and copies are known from various locations, including Ur, Nippur and Meturan. It was a part of the curriculum of scribal schools. Since the Meturan copy of has been found in a house whose inhabitant, a certain Bēlšunu, had relatives bearing theophoric names invoking Lisin, it is possible the text was connected to the active worship of this goddess. It focuses on her lament over the death of her son. She apparently blames her mother, Ninhursag, for it. The text states that her cries reached the cult center of the latter, Adab. Some of the discovered copies have the composition Enlil and Namzitara inscribed on the reverse of the tablet.

Lisin is also referenced in a single line of the lament Egime and Lulil, which also describes her as a mourning goddess. In an emesal text which might be a lament focused on a presently unidentified dying god, she appears alongside goddesses such as Nintinugga, Ninisina, Ninmug and Ereš'ugga. A fragment of another lament in which Ninhursag apparently mourns Lisin, here presented as a male deity and her son, is also known.
