= Urra =

Urra may refer to:

- Urra Moor, a moor in North Yorkshire, England
- Urra=hubullu is a major Babylonian glossary consisting of Sumerian and Akkadian lexical lists ordered by topic
- Urra, a parish (freguesia) in the district of Portalegre in Portugal
- Urra Dam, in Colombia
  - Urrá, the company that built the dam

== See also ==
- Urras, a fictional world in The Dispossessed by Ursula K. Le Guin
- Oorah (battle cry), a battle cry
