= Ninsikila =

Mesopotamian deity

- Gender: Initially male, later female

Genealogy
- Spouse: Lisin
- Children: KU-anna, KU-kita, KU-ta-abzu, KU-kita-abzu, Irḫangul, Kituš-Keš, Lalanna, Urnunta-ea

Ninsikila (or Ninsikil, 𒀭𒎏𒂖) was a Mesopotamian deity regarded as the spouse of Lisin. Early sources refer to Ninsikila as male, but starting with the Old Babylonian period the same figure came to be viewed as a goddess instead, with originally female Lisin accordingly reinterpreted as a god. The change of gender might have been influenced by an association between Ninsikila and the Dilmunite goddess Meskilak, whose name was sometimes spelled homonymously as Ninsikila in Mesopotamia, or by Lisin's placement before her spouse in god lists. Texts attesting the worship of Ninsikila include an inscription from Larsa and a magical formula from Meturan.

== Associations with other deities ==
Ninsikila was the spouse of Lisin. Eight children are assigned to them in the god list An = Anum: KU-anna, KU-kita, KU-ta-abzu, KU-kita-abzu (reading of the first sign in all four names is uncertain), Irḫangul, Kituš-Keš, Lalanna (or Lulalanna) and Urnunta-ea. It has been pointed out that while some copies of this document refer to this group of deities as the "children of Lisin," one instead calls them the "children of Ninsikila."

== Gender ==
Initially Ninsikila was considered a god and Lisin a goddess. However, in texts postdating the Old Babylonian period, and less commonly also in Old Babylonian ones, their genders could be switched, and for example in the Middle Babylonian god list An = Anum the former is female and the latter male. According to Joan Goodnick Westenholz, it is possible that the fact that in Old Babylonian god lists Ninsikila follows Lisin might have influenced the reinterpretation of their identities. An example of such a text is the Weidner god list, in which Lisin precedes Ninsikila. According to Piotr Michalowski the same order is attested in all the other known sources which list both of them in sequence. A second factor might have been the existence of a homophonous, though not identical, goddess Ninsikila, who was originally known as Meskilak and originated in Dilmun. While the name Ninsikila can be found in the myth Enki and Ninhursag, it refers to the Dilmunite goddess in this context.

The change in Ninsikila's gender has been compared to the case of Uṣur-amāssu, who appears as a male deity in An = Anum, but later came to be viewed as female.

== Worship ==
Thorkild Jacobsen assumed that Ninsikila was worshiped alongside Lisin in Adab. However, he is not listed among the deities attested in texts from this city from the third millennium BCE in a more recent survey of the local pantheon compiled by Marcos Such-Gutiérrez.

A diorite bowl from Larsa has been dedicated by a certain Ṣālilum for the life of king Rim-Sîn I jointly to Ninsikila and Lisin, according to Douglas Frayne with the former to be interpreted as a goddess and the latter as a god. However, according to Gabriella Spada it is also possible that the opposite interpretation is true.

Ninsikila appears in a magical text from Meturan which also mentions Lisin, but the passage is considered difficult to explain and might contain references to unknown mythical situations.
