= Ugallu =

Mythical monster in Babylonian religion

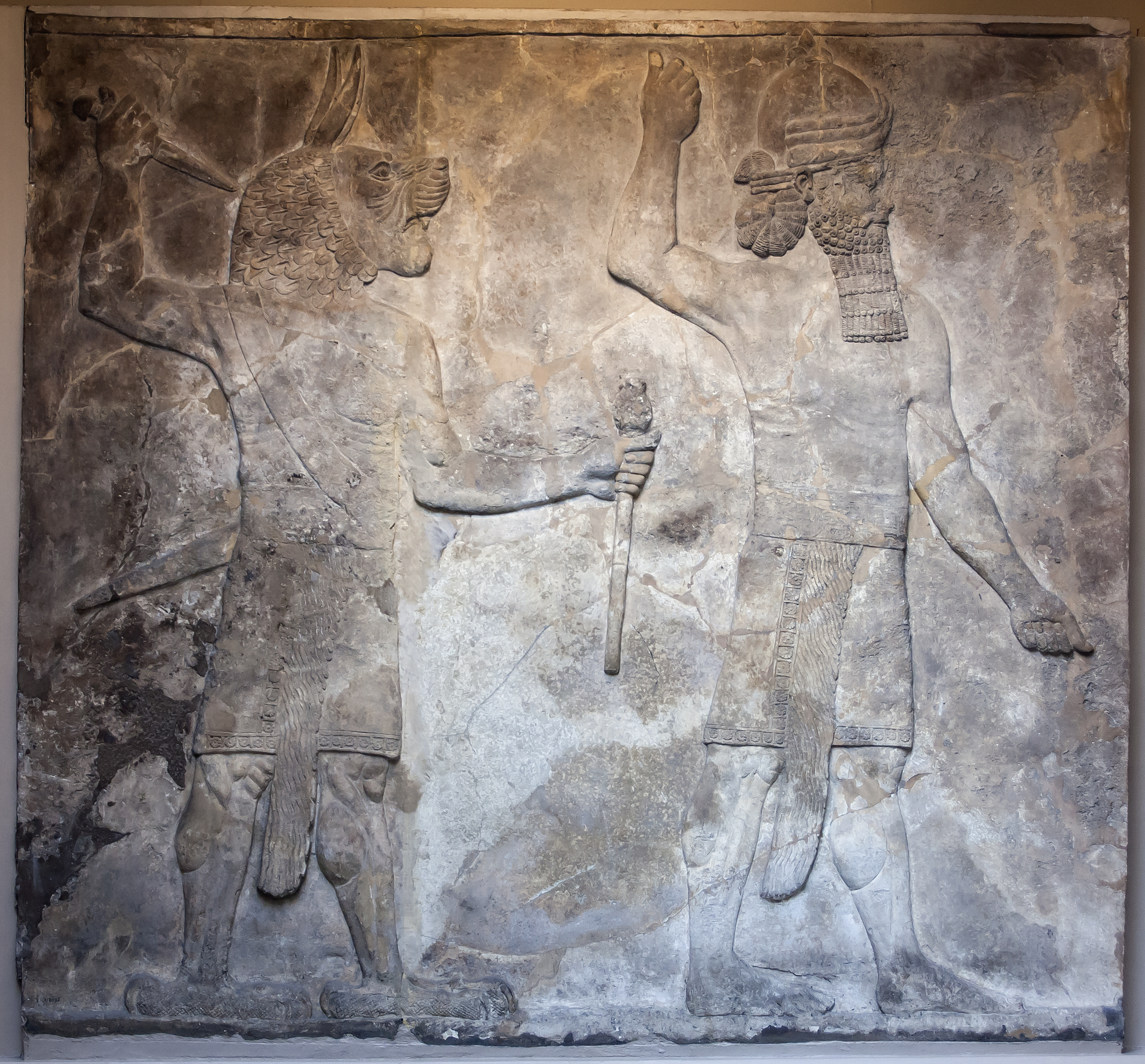
A panel with two divine palace guards, one of which is Ugallu.

Ugallu, the "Big Weather-Beast", (Sumerian inscribed 𒌓𒃲𒆷/UD.GAL.LA, Akkadian: ūmu rabû, meaning "big day"; or, better in this case: "big storm"). It was a lion-headed storm-demon and has the feet of a bird who is featured on protective amulets and apotropaic yellow clay or tamarisk figurines of the first millennium BC but had its origins in the early second millennium. The iconography changed over time, with the human feet morphing into an eagle's talons and dressing him in a short skirt. He was one of the class of ud-demons (day-demons), personifying moments of divine intervention in human life.

== Function ==
As an ud-demon, Ugallu's function is to intervene in moments of disaster in a person's life, such as saving them from death. His affiliation with the day compares him with other light related deities, Shamash the sun, the star of Sirius, and Nuska, god of the lamp. Many of his rituals as described are to be performed at night.

== Iconography ==
His iconography has notably shifted over time.

The Neo-Assyrian versions have eagle talons, and a short skirt. His weapons are the dagger and the mace, with the dagger raised above his head in a threatening manner. Two recovered amulets differ from this, with the same lion-headed Ugallu but with human feet and a long robe. This latter version seems to be quite rare, with the former version being much more common.

== Mythology ==
Ugallu was one of the eleven mythical monsters created by Tiāmat in her conflict with the younger gods, on the reverse of the first tablet of the Epic of Creation, Enûma Eliš. The tale describes how Marduk captured and bound the creatures, rehabilitating them with work reconstructing the world from the corpses of his vanquished adversaries. This transformed them into protective charms which would be used to adorn the doors of palaces, for example that of Ashurbanipal's southwest palace at Nineveh, temples, such as the Esagila of the Marduk temple as described in the Agum-Kakrime Inscription, and private dwellings (the bedrooms of the vulnerable) to ward off evil and disease.

Sometimes in pairs of ugallū, the beneficial protective demon finds special purpose in adorning the outer gates of buildings.

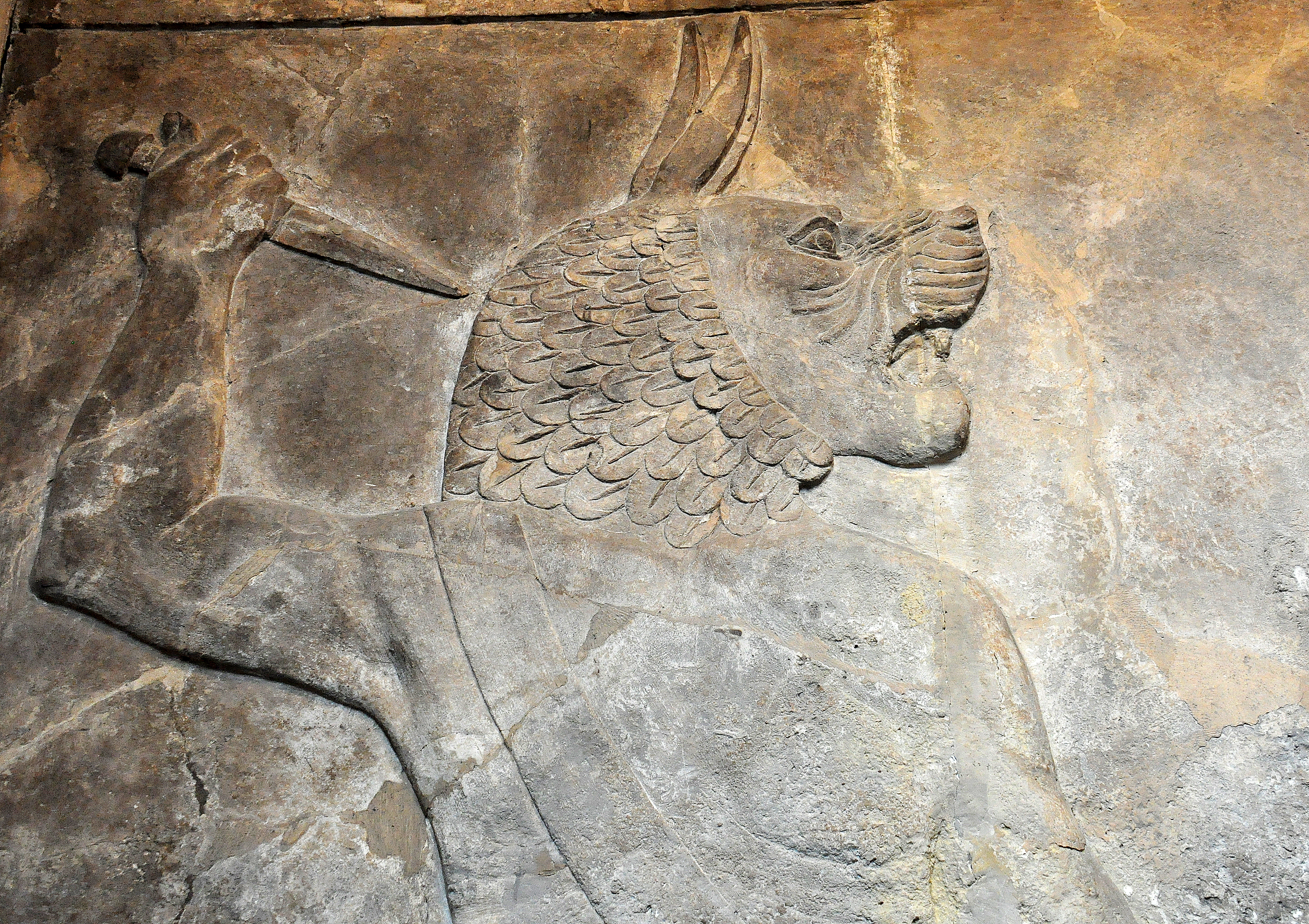
Wall relief depicting a head of an ugallu, a lion-headed man.

Ugallu first appears figuratively in the First Babylonian dynasty as a porter of the underworld, a servant of Nergal. In later times he is represented on amulets as frequently paired with the Sumerian demon Lulal, who was in many respects fairly similar in appearance. He is portrayed clasping a dagger, and described thus: "a lion's head and lion's ears, it holds a ... in its right hand and carries a mace (𒄑𒆪^{giš}TUKUL) in its left, it is girded with a dagger, its name is ugallu."

== Bibliography ==
- Farber, Walter; Wiggermann, F. A. M. (1992-01-01). "Mesopotamian Protective Spirits: The Ritual Texts". Journal of the American Oriental Society. 116 (2). ISSN 0003-0279.
- Wiggermann, Frans (2007-01-01). "Some Demons of Time and their Functions in Mesopotamian Iconography". Academia.edu.
