= Lugala'abba =

Mesopotamian god

- Sea god associated with the underworld
- Major cult center: possibly Nippur

Genealogy
- Spouse: NIN-ĝa'uga

Lugala'abba or Lugalabba was a Mesopotamian god associated with the sea, as well as with the underworld. It has been proposed that he was worshiped in Nippur. He is also attested in various god lists, in a seal inscription, and in the incantation series Šurpu.

== Name and character ==
Lugala'abba's name was written in cuneiform as ^{d}lugal-a-ab-ba. It means "king of the sea" in Sumerian. Stephanie Dalley tentatively proposes the alternate translation, "king of the Sealand". In addition to being a deity of the sea, Lugala'abba was associated with the underworld. Wilfred G. Lambert pointed out associating sea and death is not uncommon in Mesopotamian literature; for example, the Epic of Gilgamesh uses the phrases "waters of death" and "ocean" (a-ab-ba) interchangeably. A similar association is also present in the Ugaritic texts, in the Old Testament, and in Hesiod's Theogony, where the personified Styx is a daughter of Oceanus. However, Lambert also notes the most detailed known description of Lugala'abba occurs in an Akkadian incantation which does not associate him with the underworld, and instead calls him "the exorcist of the gods, the pure god" and implores him to "cast a spell of life".

== Associations with other deities ==
The goddess NIN-ĝa'uga was regarded as Lugala'abba's spouse. Her name can be translated as "queen of the dead" or, based on variant orthographies, "mistress of the house of the dead." Glosses in various explanatory texts indicate that the NIN sign in her name was read as ereš or égi, rather than nin. Wilfred G. Lambert maintained that she was the same deity as Ninmug, but according to Gianni Marchesi they were only confused with each other. In the god list An = Anum the former appears alongside Lugala'abba, apart from the latter, who is paired with Ishum. It also equates her with Ninkarrak, while the Emesal Vocabulary - with Gula. Lambert also presumed that Abzumaḫ, "exalted Apsu," was a female deity who functioned as Lugala'abba's spouse in Nippur.

== Attestations ==
According to Wilfred G. Lambert, the worship of Lugala'abba is attested in a source from Nippur. A temple to deities named ^{d}lugal-ab-a and ^{d}abzu-maḫ existed in this city during the reign of Samsu-iluna. The writing ^{d}lugal-ab-a also occurs in the Nippur god list. Manfred Krebernik assumes that it represents an older orthography of Lugala'abba's name. However, Jeremiah Peterson argues that this view is incorrect, and suggests this writing refers to a separate god, Lugaleša. Lambert considered the view that ^{d}lugal-ab-a was a different deity, as well as the reading Lugaleša ("lord of the dwelling"), to be erroneous, and described the latter as "an improbable and unparalleled deity". Active worship of Lugala'abba is not otherwise attested from any other city, though an Old Babylonian seal from the Louvre collection designates the owner as a "slave of Lugala'abba" (ìr ^{d}lugal-a-ab-ba).

In the god list An = Anum, Lugalabba appears twice, in the end of tablet V, and in tablet VI in a group of theonyms beginning with the word lugal. A different god list, which apparently only contains the names of gods associated with the underworld, places Lugala'abba after a damaged entry and before Lugal-Ḫubur, a god whose name refers to an underworld river, Ḫubur. Lugala'abba is also present in a list of Asakku demons, in which he occurs alongside Equ, Muḫra, Kūšu, Lugaledinna, Sakkut, Šulak and Latarak. It is presumed that his inclusion in it was based on his connection with the underworld. However, he is absent from a number of other similar documents which list many other members of this group.

In the incantation series Šurpu, Lugala'abba opens a sequence of invoked deities which consists of Lugalidda, Laguda, Inzak and Meskilak. (Note: Lugalidda, "king of the river", was a similar god frequently associated with him, Laguda was a sea god associated with the Persian Gulf, and Inzak and Meskilak were a pair of deities from Dilmun.)
