= Ilī-ippašra =

Babylonian governor

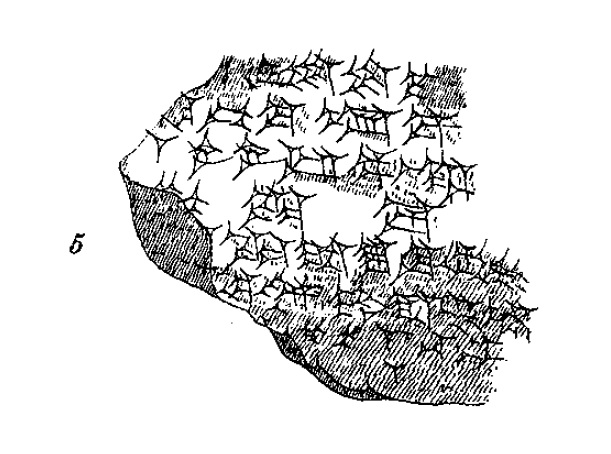
Hugo Radau's line-art for a letter from Ilī-ippašra, named on the third line, to Enlil-kidinni, called Illiliya on the first line, the governor of Nippur (Note: Tablet CBS 3834, published as BE XVII 88, found during the German excavations at Babylon.)

Ilī-ippašra (fl. c. 1360 BC), inscribed DINGIR^{meš}-ip-pa-aš-ra, and meaning "My god(s) became reconciled with me", was a Babylonian who may have been adopted or apprenticed during the reign of Kassite king Kurigalzu I, ending around 1375 BC, and rose to become an official, possibly the governor of Dilmun, during the later reign of Burna-Buriash II. He may have been a successor for Usi-ana-nuri-^{?}, the viceroy of Dilmun who was attested in the cylinder seal (Note: Cylinder seal BM 122696.) of his grandson, Uballissu-Marduk.

== Biography ==
A tablet in poor condition, (Note: Tablet D 85, formerly designated as Ni. 2860.) alleged to have been found at Larsa but provided with a Nippur-provenance designation, details the adoption contract for Ilī-ippašra. His foster parent was Sin-napširra, son of Biriritum, who obtained him from Nazi-Šiqmi, "his master", an obviously Kassite name. It was witnessed by a priest (Šamaš-nišu), a scribe (Izkur-Marduk) and two others (Kidinu and Išabtum) and was dated the 19th day of Šabatu, the year Kurigalzu built the Ekurigibara, the Enlil temple in Nippur (c. 1380s BC).

We next meet Ilī-ippašra some years later, when he is stationed in Dilmun, in his correspondence with Enlil-kidinni, who was the governor, or šandabakku, of Nippur, c. 1342–1336 BC, whom he addresses as Illiliya, a familiar hypocoristicon. The Kassite administrative center was at Qal'at al-Bahrain, confirmed in 1995 by the discovery of a large cache of cuneiform tablets. Three letters have been found in Iraq, but one of these is illegible apart from the opening salutation and mention of a certain "royal command". Much of the content of the other letters concerns the nefarious activities of the Ahlamu, where the term is used perhaps as "Bedouin" might be today, as it was employed elsewhere as a synonym for 'Amurru' (MAR.TU.MEŠ), in the Middle Euphrates and in western Syria regions. Ilī-ippašra does not appear to be totally in control of the events unfolding around him. He greets his brother with "may Inzak and Meskilak, the gods of Dilmun, guard your life" and then speaks to him of their depredations:

The Aḫlamû who surround me have taken away the dates – and as far as I am concerned, there is nothing that I can do. (Note: Tablet Ni.615, lines 13–16, 9–11.)

— Ilī-ippašra, Tablet Ni.615

The Aḫlamû certainly speak words of hostility and plunder to me. Of making peace, they do not speak to me. When I asked them for Bēlû-ḫebil, they did not hand him over. (Note: Tablet Ni.641, lines 12–22.)

— Ilī-ippašra, Tablet Ni.641

A series of madbasa, or date presses were housed in the palace, evidence of the importance of this agricultural activity and the earliest appearance for this equipment which was later to become common on the island.

He warns of travelers to Babylonia, a certain Iltānu who is to leave, and [Ku]tetu who has already left, of whom he says "for the departure of this [woman] of his, I am not responsible." Much of the rest of the correspondence concerns his inability to complete the repairs to the palace, or É.GAL, or the decrepit local temple, projects which are beset by visions, possibly squatters, and other demands on his meager resources. The outcome of the dispute with the Aḫlamû was apparently violent as a massive fire gutted the complex and it was abandoned, never to be rebuilt.

He may be the individual who is mentioned as the father of Ninurta-bānī and Ba'il-Nabû who rented five slaves (Tukulti-Ninurta, Alšisu-abluṭ, Kidin-Gula, Ilanūtum, and their mother, Beltutum) from Enlil-Kidinni in a tablet (Note: Tablet CBS 12906, published as PBS XIV no. 2, at CDLI, DINGIR-ip-pa-aš-ra appears on line 9.) dated to the sixth reignal year of Burna-Buriaš (c. 1354 BC). Other fleeting references to a man of this name in undated tablets recovered from the same Nippur cache include an account record (Note: Tablet CBS 10953 published as PBS II 2, 111, at CDLI, line 19.) where he is listed as the father of Šenni, in other account documents, (Note: Tablet CBS 3476 published as PBS II 2, 105 on line 9.) (Note: Tablet CBS 3336, published as PBS XIV 10) a roster, (Note: Tablet CBS 13090 published as PBS II 2, no. 130, on lines 55 and 77, at CDLI.) and a fragment of a letter. (Note: Tablet CBS 11098 published as PBS XVII No. 31 at CDLI on line 15.)
