= Lulal =

Mesopotamian deity

Lulal, inscribed ^{d}lú.làl in cuneiform (𒀭𒇽𒋭), was a Mesopotamian god associated with Inanna, usually as a servant deity or bodyguard but in a single text as a son. His name has Sumerian origin and can be translated as "syrup man."

In the second and first millennium BCE, Lulal evolved into an anthropomorphic god/demon used on protective amulets, figurines and exorcists’ paraphernalia used in apotropaic rituals, such as Šurpu and Maqlu, usually displayed alongside Ugallu, “Big Weather Beast”, the lion-headed demon, or with his Akkadian alter-ego Lātarāk.

== Function as God ==
As a god, Lulal functioned as the Sumerian counterpart of the Akkadian Latarak. His name likely means "syrup man" or "man sweet like syrup." His precise function is not fully understood. It is theorized that he was a god of animal husbandry, evidenced by one epithet of his lugal-eden-na "King of the Steppe", and his connection with the cult place of Bad-tibira and the god Šakkan, who served such a function. A possible link between him and Shara, the tutelary god of Umma has been proposed in modern scholarship, but has yet to be conclusively proven.

According to a study done by Jeremiah Peterson and Anna Glen, only one Sumerian cultic song about him has been identified. The tablet was uncovered in the city of Nippur, and thirteen lines are well-preserved.

=== Worship ===
According to the myth Inanna's Descent to the Netherworld, Bad-tibira was the cult center of Lulal. His temple in this city was Emush(kalamma), "House, Foundation (of the Land)", in which Inanna and Dumuzi were also worshiped.

The E-shenumun, "House of Barleycorn", was a temple dedicated to him (according to Andrew R. George in the role of a "divine cowherd") in Apak, according to a Neo-Babylonian temple list from Sippar.

Ur-dukuga, a king from the First Dynasty of Isin, built a temple to him in Dul-edena, which was probably his cultic city as well.

== Function as Protector Demon ==
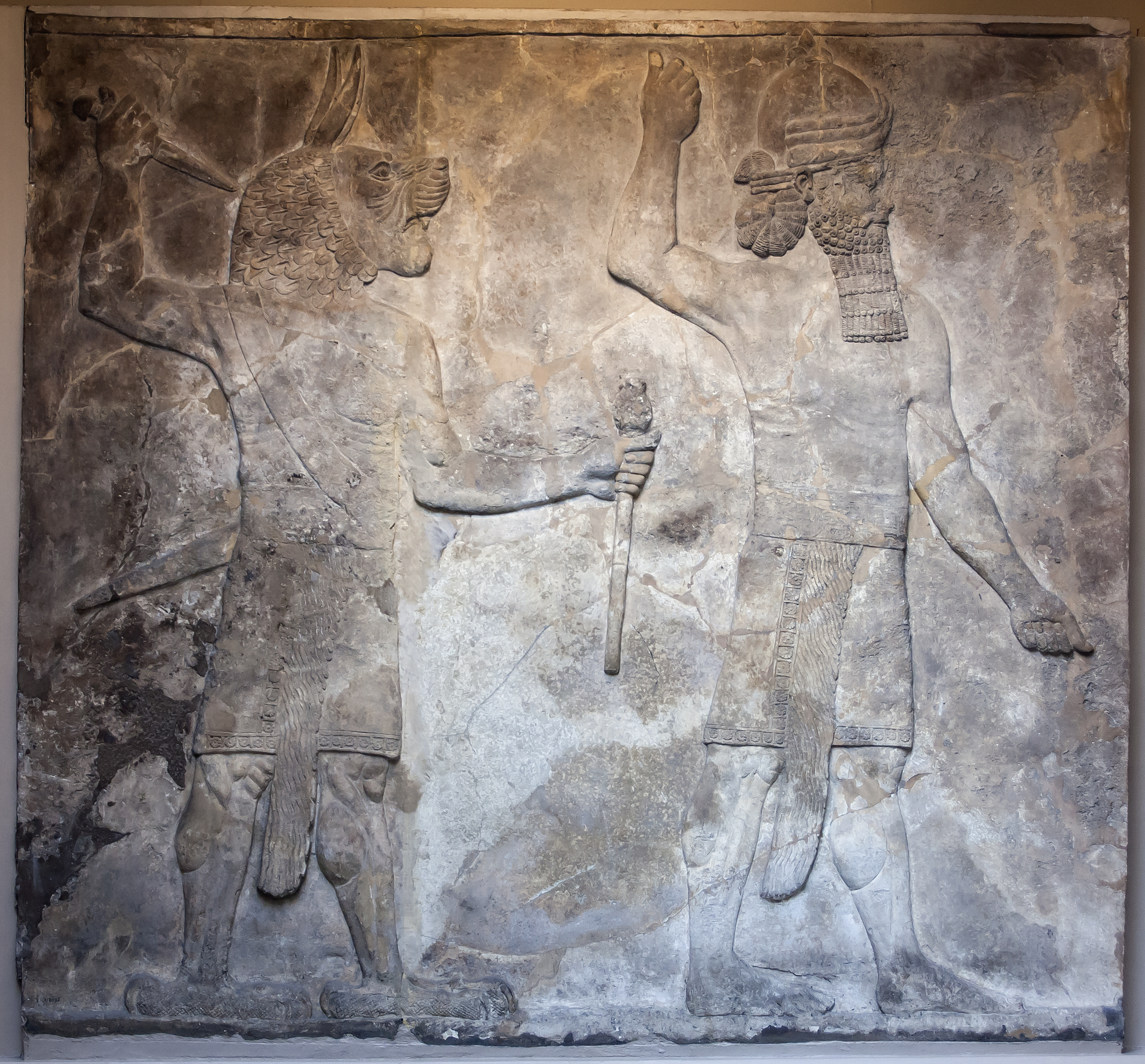
Ugallu (left) and Lulal (right) in relief on the wall of the Southwest Palace of Nineveh.

=== Protective Objects and Reliefs ===
Lulal was paired with Ugallu demons on objects meant to drive away evil, such as amulets, stamp seals, bells, statues or figurines, and plaques. They are also to be assigned to guard the gate of the house. Appearing alongside gods. Statues of him were also commonly buried under the home. One text has him buried in the courtyard, alongside Latarak.

The Ugallu-Lulal pair often appear side by side in relief as well. One distinct example of their service as protective deities are there use in the stone reliefs on the walls of the Neo-Assyrian Southwest Palace of Nineveh. These reliefs were found in doorways linking larger more common spaces into inner chambers, notably the throne room. In these reliefs they are thought to be protecting access to the more private areas of the palace, ensuring that evil is kept away. There were similar doorways identified in the palace of Assurbanipal.

=== Ritual Texts ===
Many texts describe protective rituals undertaken around the home, involving Lulal statues and amulets. One ritual calls for two pairs of clay Lulal and Latarak statues, with Lulal painted blue and Latarak painted black. (It is notable that only gods would be painted with blue, black, or red paint, but also that gods would typically be made from tamarisk while Lulal was fashioned from clay.) These statues, as well as many others, would go through several ceremonies, including being set out by the river facing east, sprinkled with water, and being present for animal sacrifices and incantations. Lulal's statues are described as being buried "In the back corners of the courtyard" probably with Latarak in the opposing corners.

In other texts, statues of the pair were placed at (or inside) the gates, "to prevent the approach of whatever evil." Ugallu would be present there as well.

=== Iconography ===
In the Nineveh reliefs Lulal appears as a man in a kilt, sometimes holding up a hand in greeting or in preparation to strike, and wearing a horned crown that signifies divinity. He appears much the same on a bronze-copper bell, unarmed, one hand raised.

Ritual statues of him had his fist raised, and some included a headband under his crown, where Franz Wiggermann describes his hair style as "old fashioned." It is possible that either him or Latarak could appear more monstrous or an animal-human hybrid in statues. However it is more likely it is Latarak that has this appearance.

== Relation to other Demons and Deities ==
=== Latarak ===
Lulal was closely associated with Latarak. While Lulal's name is Sumerian, Latarak's name has been argued to be Akkadian in origin. Wilfred G. Lambert suggested that it should be interpreted as a negated infinite (of unknown meaning), similar to Lagamal. In an emesal vocabulary and in the Weidner god list, they are treated as two names of one deity, but it remains unknown if their relationship was envisioned this way from the start. There are also sources where they are treated as two separate deities who function as a pair.

=== Inanna ===
Lulal's connection with the goddess Inanna is well attested. He appears as her bodyguard in Inanna's Descent to the Netherworld, and is referenced as serving her in battle in another text. This association between them has been characterized as "close but unspecified." In a single composition he is described as a fetus in Inanna's womb, and born by her as a storm demon. This text is explicitly identified as representing a tradition distinct from that known from Inanna's Descent by Anna Glenn and Jeremiah Peterson.

Without the divine determinative, the name Lulal could function as an epithet of Inanna's lover, as evidenced by the text Song of the Lettuce. In this case it most likely should be understood literary as "syrup man" rather than as a reference to the god. Terms related to syrup or honey appear in euphemistic allusions to foreplay in Sumerian erotic poetry. Whether Lulal himself could be regarded as a divine lover is uncertain, though it has been proposed that in some cases he could be identified with Dumuzi, well attested in such a role.

=== Ugallu ===
As noted in his function section, the two pair frequently in reliefs and on protective charms.

=== Pazuzu ===
Lulal appears with Ugallu on the backs of Pazuzu heads and plaques depicting the demon, assisting him in his function of repelling evil, or possibly as a way of restraining his wild urges.
