= Nabnitu =

Nabnitu ("Creation") is an ancient encyclopedic work of the Old Babylonian period (c. 1800 BCE) that consists of multiple tablets. The name Nabnitu is taken from the first line of the first tablet in the series. Some of the tablets provide "scientific" names for "parts" of objects and the human body. Tablet VII lists the parts of the human hand.

Tablet XXXI seems to refer to domesticated animals. The readable part of this tablet mentions the pig and bull. Other tablets provide information concerning human actions/activities. Tablet IX is concerned with the activity of singing.

Tablet XXXII is the 32nd tablet in the series in the collections of the British Museum. It is also cited as UET VII 126 (with the excavation number U.3011). It is a lexical tablet written in Sumerian-Akkadian text from Ur.

This tablet lists the names and order of the nine strings of an unidentified musical instrument (presumed to be a horizontal harp). It, therefore, refers to the parts of a musical instrument and its construction.

The nine strings, numbered symmetrically as 1-2-3-4-5-4-3-2-1, are presented in two parallel columns, one in Sumerian and the other in Akkadian. The table also indicates that there are "front" and "back" designations. 1-(first)-2(second)-3(front)-4(front)-5(middle)-4(back)-3(back)-2(back)-1(backmost). Other important designations are the word "thin" and "small". The word "small" is written next to string 3 and "small" next to string 4. This means that the unidentified instrument is constructed with a high tension at the front and a low tension at the back.
