= Urra=hubullu =

Ancient Babylonian glossary or encyclopedia

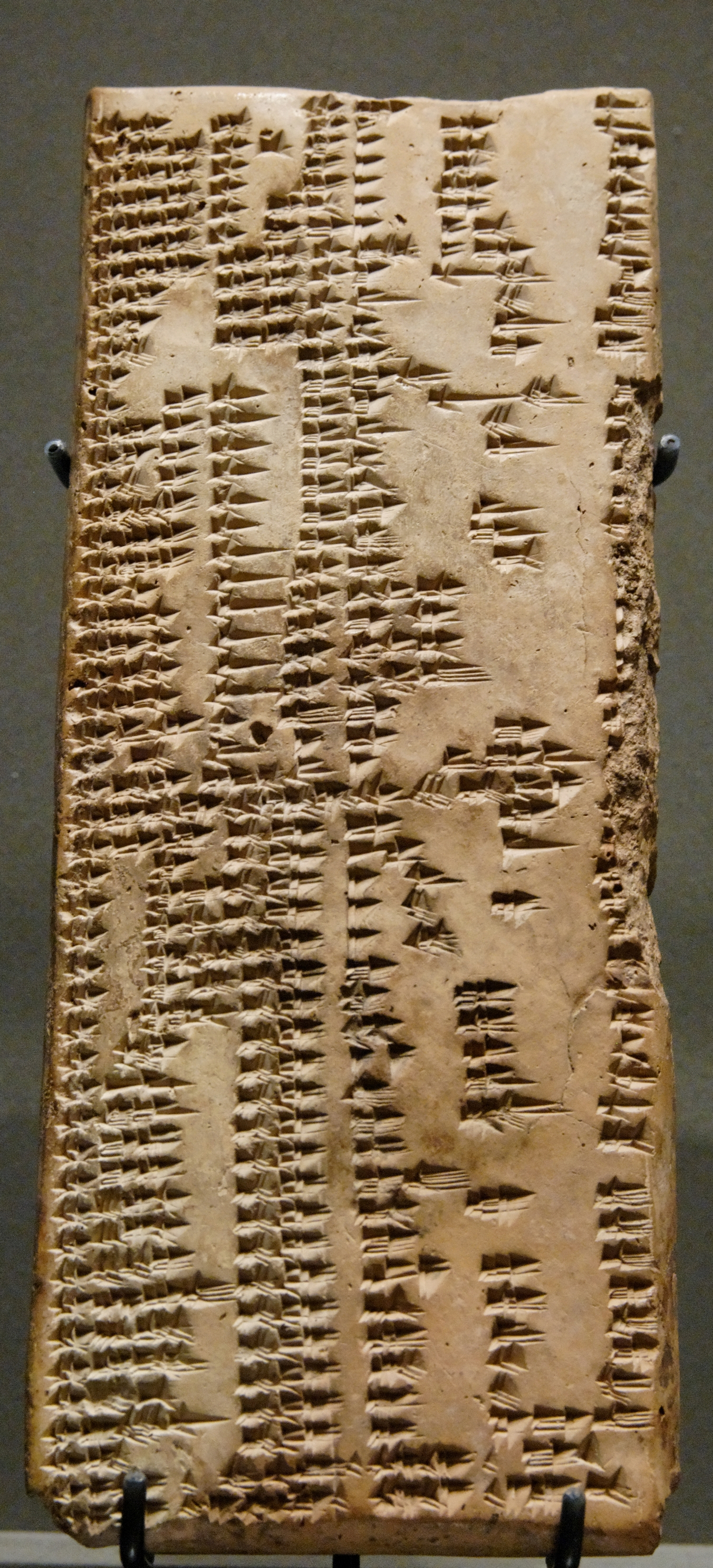
16th tablet of the Urra=hubullu, Louvre Museum

The Urra=hubullu (𒄯𒊏 𒄷𒇧𒈝 ur_{5}-ra — ḫu-bul-lu_{4}; or HAR-ra = ḫubullu, or Gegenstandslisten ("lists of objects")) is a major Babylonian glossary or "encyclopedia". It consists of Sumerian and Akkadian lexical lists ordered by topic. The canonical version extends to 24 tablets, and contains almost 10,000 words. The conventional title is the first gloss, ur_{5}-ra and ḫubullu meaning "interest-bearing debt" in Sumerian and Akkadian, respectively. One bilingual version from Ugarit [RS2.(23)+] is Sumerian/Hurrian rather than Sumerian/Akkadian.

A partial table of contents:

- Tablets 1-2: juridical forms thought to be possibly part of the ana ittišu series
- Tablets 3-7: names of trees, parts of trees, products of trees, and wooden objects
- Tablet 4: naval vehicles
- Tablet 5: terrestrial vehicles
- Tablets 10-12: names of vessels, ovens, clay objects, hides, chemicals, and objects of bronze, copper, silver
- Tablets 12, 14 & 15: systematic enumeration of the names of domestic animals, terrestrial animals, birds (including bats) and parts of the body
- Tablet 16: stones
- Tablet 17: plants
- Tablet 19: names of wool and vestments
- Tablets 21-22: names of towns, countries, mountains, and rivers
- Tablets 22-23: provisions
- Tablet 24: list of men.

The tablets form a series that had been arranged by time of the Sumerian Dynasty of Isin, with a bilingual tradition existing by the time of the Kassites. The bulk of the collection was compiled in the Old Babylonian period (early 2nd millennium BC), with pre-canonical forerunner documents extending into the later 3rd millennium.

Like other canonical glossaries, the Urra=hubullu was often used for scribal practice. Other Babylonian glossaries include:

- Ea: a family of lists that give the simple signs of the cuneiform writing system with their pronunciation and Akkadian meanings. (MSL volume 14)
- "Table of Measures": conversion tables for grain, weights and surface measurements. Again, it is not clear how these tablets were used.
- Lú and Lú=ša, a list of professions (MSL volume 12)
- Izi, a list of compound words ordered by increasing complexity
- Diri "limited to compound logograms whose reading cannot be inferred from their individual components; it also includes marginal cases such as reduplications, presence or absence of determinatives, and the like." (MSL volume 14)
- Nigga, Erimhuš and other school texts
- Ana ittišu: a legal glossary.

== Extant tablets ==
Many copies of the series are known in collections such as the Louvre, British Museum and Ashmolean Museum. The original Akkadian texts were found during the Oxford-Field Museum Expedition to Kish, Iraq (1923–1933). The texts are collated and summarised by Meer (1939).
