= Khaled Nashef =

Palestinian archaeologist and historian

- خالد ناشف
- Born: January 13, 1942; Tulkarm, Mandatory Palestine
- Died: February 11, 2009 (aged 67); Amman, Jordan
- Occupations: Archaeologist, historian
- Years active: 1978–2009
- Known for: Contributions to Near Eastern archaeology, Tübingen Atlas project

Khaled Nashef (Arabic: خالد ناشف, DMG: Ḫālid Nāšif; 13 January 1942 – 11 February 2009) was a Palestinian archaeologist and historian who made contributions to the fields of Near Eastern archaeology and Palestinian cultural heritage preservation.

== Early life and education ==
Nashef was born on 13 January 1942 in Tulkarem, Mandatory Palestine. He received his early education at Al-Fadiliya School. He went on to study at the University of Vienna and earned a doctorate degree in history in 1976, specializing in Akkadian and Sumerian languages.

== Career ==
From 1978 to 1987, Nashef worked at the University of Tübingen in Germany, where he contributed to the Tübinger Atlas des Vorderen Orients (TAVO) after which he worked at the King Saud University in Saudi Arabia. In 1994, he started teaching at Birzeit University in Palestine, where he served as the Director of the Palestinian Institute of Archaeology. In this role, he conducted significant research on Palestinian archaeological heritage and supervised excavations, including work at Khirbet Birzeit in 2000. He also established the peer-reviewed Journal of Palestinian Archaeology.

== Death ==
He was exiled from Palestine by the Israeli occupation in 1998 following the Oslo Accords, where he continued his research until his death on 11 February 2009 in Amman, Jordan.

== Research and publications ==
Nashef specialized in Ancient Near Eastern studies and Near Eastern archaeology. He published numerous scholarly works in both German and Arabic. His research interests included geographical studies of ancient Mesopotamia. His publications include:

- Die Orts- und Gewässernamen der mittelbabylonischen und mittelassyrischen Zeit (1982), a geographical lexicon of place names in Middle Babylonian and Middle Assyrian texts;
- Babylonien und Assyrien in der zweiten Hälfte des zweiten Jahrtausends v. Chr. (1983), on Babylon and Assyria in the second half of the second millennium BCE;
- Rekonstruktion der Reiserouten zur Zeit der altassyrischen Handelsniederlassungen (1987), a reconstruction of travel routes during the Old Assyrian trading colony period;
- Die Orts- und Gewässernamen der altassyrischen Zeit (1991), on place and water names in the Old Assyrian period;
- تدمير التراث الحضاري العراقي، فصول الكارثة The Destruction of Iraq's Cultural Heritage: Chapters of the Catastrophe.
- "Deites of Dilmun" in "Bahrain through the ages";
- Répertoire géographique des textes eunéiformes

Nashef also made significant contributions to Palestinian cultural studies, particularly through his work on documenting and preserving Palestinian heritage. He wrote extensively about Taufiq Canaan, a pioneering Palestinian ethnographer and physician, publishing articles such as "Tawfik Canaan: His Life and Works" in the Jerusalem Quarterly in 2002. He also translated and studied Canaan's collection of Palestinian amulets, contributing to the preservation of this aspect of Palestinian cultural heritage.

Another area of his research was the medieval sugar industry in the region.
