= Jean-Jacques Glassner =

French historian

Jean-Jacques Glassner (born 1944 in Bischwiller, Alsace) is a French historian, specialist of the Mesopotamian world and cuneiform script.

== Biography ==
During his studies at the Pantheon-Sorbonne University, he devoted himself to assyriology. He later taught at the universities of Geneva, Poitiers, Strasbourg, Jerusalem. A professor at the École des hautes études en sciences sociales (EHESS), he is also directeur de recherche at the CNRS where he heads the Unit of archaeology and sciences of ancient times in Paris West University Nanterre La Défense.

His research has focused specifically on the cuneiform script. In 2006, appeared under his leadership the French version of the "Archaeological encyclopedia of the Holy land" (Dictionnaire archéologique de la Bible) (Paris, Hazan).

== Publications ==
- 1986: La Chute d'Akkadé. L'événement et sa mémoire, Berlin, D. Reimer.
- 1993: Chroniques mésopotamiennes, presented and transl. by Jean-Jacques Glassner, Paris, Les Belles Lettres.
- 2000: Écrire à Sumer. L'invention du cunéiforme, Paris, Éditions du Seuil.
- 2002: La Mésopotamie, Paris, les Belles lettres.
- 2003: La Tour de Babylone. Que reste-t-il de la Mésopotamie ?, Paris, Éditions du Seuil.
- 2006: (dir.) Dictionnaire archéologique de la Bible, under the direction of Avraham Negev and Shimon Gibson for the English edition Archaeological encyclopedia of the Holy land; French edition under the direction of Jean-Jacques Glassner; translated from English by Marianne and Nicolas Véron; photographs by Zev Radovan and Erich Lessing, Paris, Hazan, ISBN 2-85025-907-1.
