= Lexical lists =

Series of ancient Mesopotamian glossaries

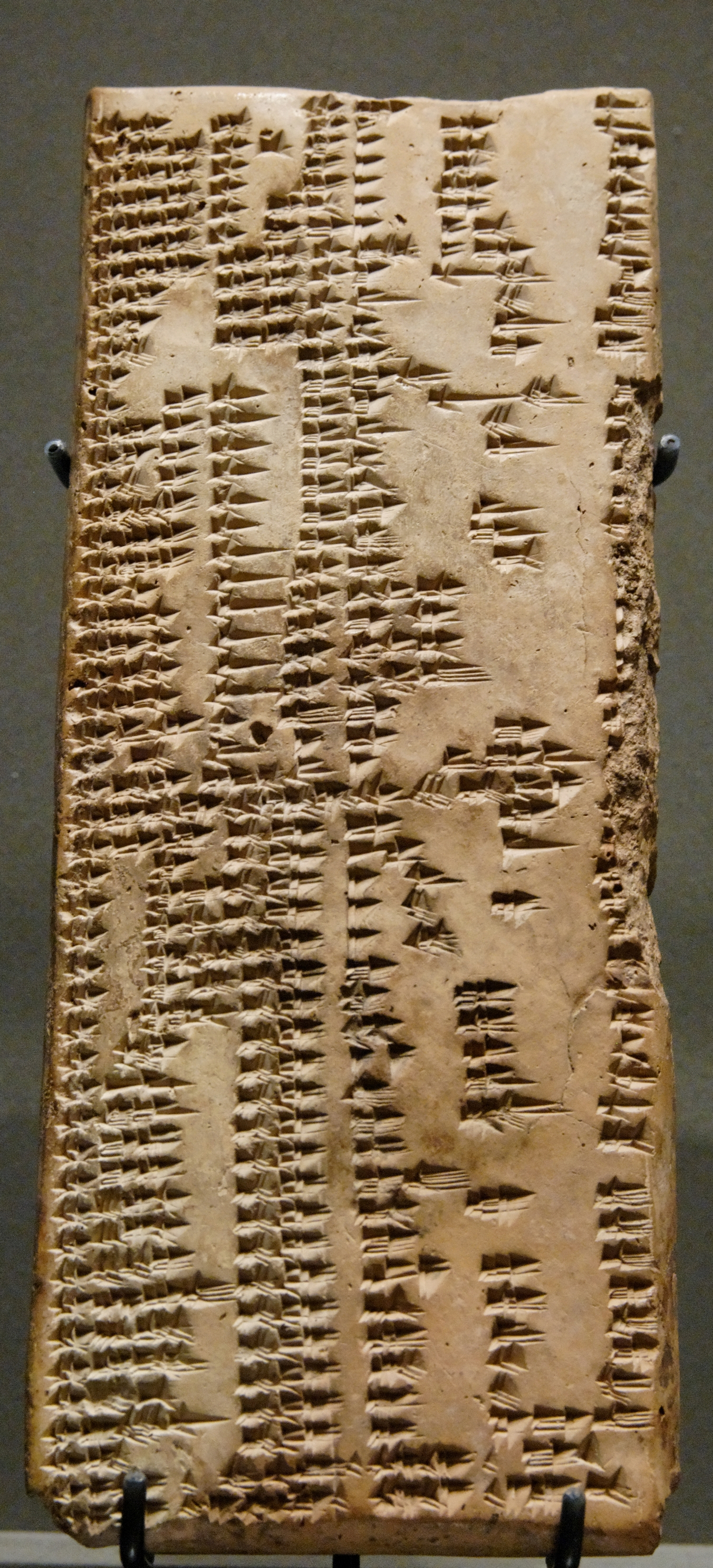
16th tablet of the Urra=hubullu lexical series, Louvre Museum

The cuneiform lexical lists are a series of ancient Mesopotamian glossaries which preserve the semantics of Sumerograms, their phonetic value and their Akkadian or other language equivalents. They are the oldest literary texts from Mesopotamia and one of the most widespread genres in the ancient Near East. Wherever cuneiform tablets have been uncovered, inside Iraq or in the wider Middle East, these lists have been discovered.

== History ==
The earliest lexical lists are the archaic (early third millennium BC) word lists uncovered in caches of business documents and which comprise lists of nouns, the absence of verbs being due to their sparse use in these records of commercial transactions. The most notable text is LU A, a list of professions which would be reproduced for the next thousand years until the end of the Old Babylonian period virtually unchanged. Later third millennium lists dating to around 2600 BC have been uncovered at Fara and Abū Ṣalābīkh, including the Fara God List, the earliest of this genre. The tradition continued until the end of the Ur III period, after which marked changes in the form of the texts took place. This era, the Old Babylonian period, saw the emergence of the UR_{5}-ra = hubullu themed list. Similarly, lists of complex signs and polyvalent symbols emerged to support a more nuanced scribal training.

The Kassite or the Middle Babylonian period shows that scribal schools actively preserved the lexical traditions of the past and there is evidence of the canonization of some texts, such as izi = išātu and Ká-gal = abullu. The works SIG_{7}+ALAN (ulutim) = nabnītu and Erim-huš = anantu are thought to have been composed at this time. The first millennium BC represents a further expansion and refinement of the texts and the introduction of commentaries and synonym lists.

== Function and typology ==
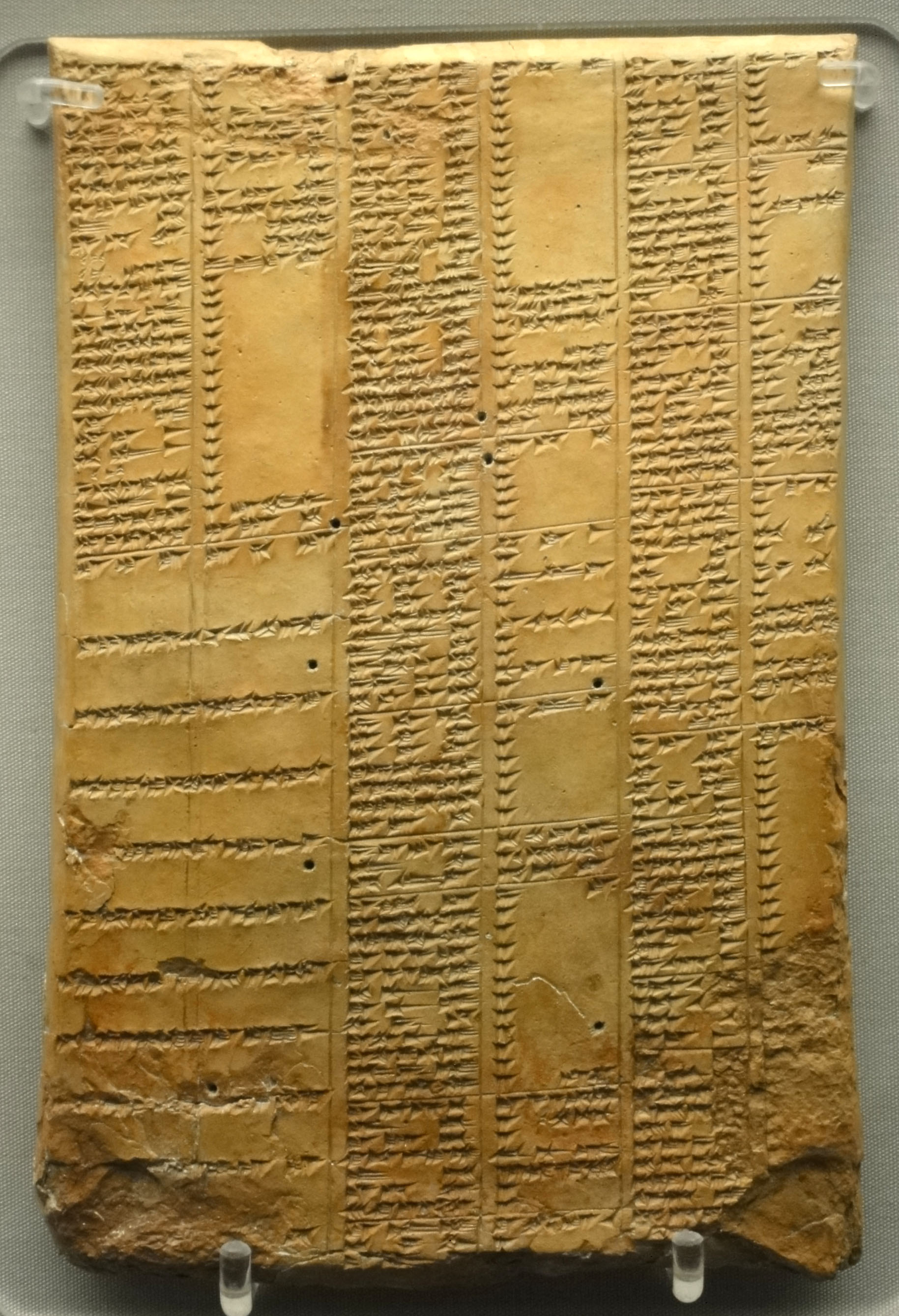
Lexical list of synonyms; "explicit" Malku = šarru tablet 3, reverse Sumerian/Akkadian. Nineveh, 7th Century BC British Museum.

Lexical lists fall within one or more of the following broad categories:

- simple sign lists and syllabaries
- complex or compound sign lists, name lists
- acrographic sign lists, ordered by sign shape or orientation
- thematic lexical texts
- synonym and/or antonym lists
- lists expounding homophony (multiple symbols, single sound) and polyvalency (single symbols, multiple meanings)

The extant texts can be classified by typology as follows:

- Prisms and large tablets
- Teacher-student exercises
- Single column tablets
- Lentils ("practice buns")

This would also have included wax-covered writing boards, though no known examples survive.

== List of lexical and synonym lists ==
The following provides a listing of the various synonym, lexical and grammatical lists whose occurrences have yielded a name used in antiquity or significance has resulted in a designation in modern Assyriology, where the MSL (Materialem zum sumerischen Lexikon / Materials for the Sumerian Lexikon) or other references in square parentheses give the primary publication of the lexical texts, the synonym texts not qualifying for inclusion in this (MSL) series.

- á = idu a brief two-tablet sign list of the first millennium [CT XI 28-32 (Note: R. Campbell Thompson (1900). Cuneiform texts from Babylonian tablets, &c. in the British Museum. Part XI. British Museum. plates 28-32 line art.)]
- ^{A-á}A = nâqu, "to cry, groan", a 42-tablet, 14,400 entry list [MSL XIV]
- Abū Salābīkh god-list [SEL 2 3-23]
- AD-GI_{4}, Archaic Word List C, "tribute", a misnomer based on identification of gú/gún with tax, a concise archaic Sumerian, or perhaps proto-Euphratic, word list of animals, numbers, foodstuff and agricultural terminology embedded in a thanksgiving ritual, first encountered in Uruk and later in Ur and Fāra[KAV 46-47, 63-65 (Note: Otto Schroeder (1920). Keilschrifttexte aus Assur, Verschiedenen Inhalts (KAV or WVDOG 35). J. C. Hinrichs. plates 46-47, 63-65 line art.)]
- alan = lānu, an acrographic word list [CT XVIII pl. 38, 39-41, 47, (Note: R. Campbell Thompson (1904). Cuneiform texts from Babylonian tablets, &c. in the British Museum. Part XVIII. British Museum. line art.) CT XIV pl. 11 (Note: R. Campbell Thompson (1904). Cuneiform texts from Babylonian tablets, &c. in the British Museum. Part XIX. British Museum. line art.)]
- An = Anum, a Sumerian god synonym-list on six tablets thought to have originated during the late Kassite era [CT XXIV 20-50 (Note: L. W. King (1908). Cuneiform texts from Babylonian tablets, &c. in the British Museum. Part XXIV. British Museum. plates 20-50 line art.)]
- An = Anu ša amēli, "An is the Anu of man", undoubtedly a Kassite product according to Lambert, an Akkadian list of around 160 divine names[CT XXV, pl. 47, 48, (Note: L. W. King (1909). Cuneiform texts from Babylonian tablets, &c. in the British Museum. Part XXV. British Museum. line art.) CT XXVI, pl. 50 (Note: L. W. King (1909). Cuneiform texts from Babylonian tablets, &c. in the British Museum. Part XXVI. British Museum. line art.)]
- An = šamu, possibly an explicit version of Malku = šarru [CT XVIII, pl. 24]
- ki-ulutin-bi-še_{3} = ana ittišu, legal terms, a phrasebook with sentences used in contracts [MSL I]
- AN.ŠÁR = Anu, a single-tablet synonym list of deities of Neo-Assyrian origin, a later continuation of An = Anum, designated tablet IX.
- An-ta-gál = šaqû, an Assyrian word list giving synonyms and antonyms on ten tablets [MSL XVII]
- Assyrian Temple List, extant in copies from Nineveh and Assur
- Babylonian Temple List
- Birds, archaic word-list
- Canonical Temple List, a theological list extant from the Library of Ashurbanipal
- Cattle, archaic word-list
- Cities/god list, early dynastic tablet found in single exemplar from Ur with two simple lists
- Dimmir = dingir = ilum, Emesal vocabulary, an Assyrian list [MSL IV]
- Diri, DIR siāku = (w)atru, "to be bigger than", list of complex or compound signs composed of two or more basic signs on 7-tablets and 2,100 entries [MSL XV]
- ^{Ea}A = nâqu, a sign list with the format: Sumerian gloss–Sumerian sign–Akkadian translation which eventually grew to 8-tablets and a line-count of around 2,400 by the Neo-Babylonian period[MSL XIV
- Ebla syllabaries, vocabulary and sign list, c. 2400 BC, one of the syllabaries is an adaption of LU A to local Syrian vernacular
- Erim-huš = anantu, a list explaining rare words in literary texts giving brief sequences of synonyms or near-synonyms on 7 tablets [MSL XVII]
- Fāra god lists (there are at least five), the earliest extant god-lists with around 500 of them listed without elaboration, from Šuruppak c. 2600 BC
- Fish, archaic word-list
- Genouillac, or Mari, god list, an Old Babylonian god list of 473 names in 10 columns [TCL 15 10 (Note: H. de Genouillac (1930). Textes religieux sumériens du Louvre (TCL 15). plate 15 line art.)]
- Geography X, early dynastic list of place names and terms
- Great Star List, a first Millennium list on perhaps 10 tablets [CT XXVI pl. 40-49]
- ḪAR.GUD = imrû = ballu, or mur-gud = im-ru-ú = bal-lu, "fodder", a commentary on the UR_{5}-ra hubullu series
- HAR(or UR_{5})-ra = hubullu, "commercial loan" the most important thematically arranged word-list, around 3300 lines long and comprising six themed sub-lists, 9,700 entries on 24 tablets [MSL V-XI]
- igituḫ (igi-du_{8}-a) = tāmartu, "visibility"
- Isin god list, Old Babylonian era local variant list.
- izi = išātu a Kassite-era acrographic word list, on more than 30 tablets [MSL XIII]
- Ká-gal = abullu, "great gate", list of temples and other building types [MSL XIII]
- List C, of Akkadian personal names
- List of diseases, bilingual, Old Babylonian origin [MSL IX]
- LÚ A, nám ešda, archaic list of professions with 140 entries, 185 exemplars dating from Uruk IV onward
- ^{lú}azlag_{2} = ašlāku, "fuller", more extensive bilingual list of professions (Old Babylonian Lu_{2}) [MSL XII]
- LU E, early dynastic list of professions apparently created to replace LÚ A with an updated list of professions, its life was however much shorter, about three centuries until the Sargonic period
- lú = ša, a five-tablet canonical list of terms referring to human beings (only unilingual copies extant) [MSL XII]
- lù = zitàte [MSL XII]
- Malku = šarru, "king", 8-tablet Akkadian synonym list with around ten percent of its content drawn from West-Semitic, Kassite, Hurrian, Hittite and Elamite languages [AOAT 50]
- Metal, NAGAR, an archaic word-list originating in the Uruk IV period but with 56 exemplars in the later Uruk III/Jemdet Nasr period
- Níg-ga = makkūru, "property", acrographic exercises beginning with the symbol NÍG [MSL XIII]
- Nippur god list, gives approximately 270 divine names and dates from the Old-Babylonian period
- Officials, early dynastic list of job titles
- Plants, archaic word-list
- proto-Aa, bilingual version of Proto-Ea with a number of Akkadian translations for each of the Sumerian values (Old-Babylonian)
- proto-Ea, the designation for two different texts, a syllabary and a vocabulary, a format with, and one without glosses, expounding polyvalency (Old-Babylonian)
- proto-Diri, complex signs (Old-Babylonian)
- proto-Izi, a more advanced lexical exercise, an acrographic list (Old-Babylonian)
- proto-Kagal, acrographic exercises, beginning with terms related to gates and buildings and concluding with terms prefixed with GIŠ determinative (Old-Babylonian)
- proto-ki-ulutin-bi-še_{3} (Old-Babylonian)
- proto-Lú, a thematic list of titles and professions, kinship terms, and other designations for human beings (Old-Babylonian) [MSL XII, 42]
- proto-Ur_{5}-ra, a six "tablet" early version of the later work with each tablet ending with the doxology ^{d}nisaba zà-mí: Nisaba be praised (Old-Babylonian)
- Reciprocal Ea, list of homophonous signs
- SAG A, sag = awīlum, Old-Babylonian acrographic list [MSL SS 1]
- SAG B, sag = ilum, Middle-Babylonian acrographic list [MSL SS 1]
- SIG_{7}+ALAN (ulutim) = nabnītu, "form" or "appearance", an Akkado-Sumerian vocabulary of the names of body parts and related terms on between 32 and 54 tablets with at least 10,500 entries probably composed during the Kassite period, which uniquely orders thematically and in etymological sequence [MSL XVI]
- Syllabary A, an elementary sign list [MSL III]
- Syllable Alphabet A, a very elementary exercise thought to date to the Ur III period, the only Old Babylonian exercise that was thoroughly standardized all over Babylonia [MVN 6 4]
- Syllabary B, a two tablet compendium, a sign list derived from ^{Ea}A = nâqu, the oldest copies being Middle-Babylonian
- Syllable Alphabet B, Old Babylonian sign-list, from Nippur, called the "Sumerian Primer" by Chiera, a standardized and repetitious sign exercise [MSL SS 1]
- Syllable Vocabulary A, Syllable Alphabet A with speculative Akkadian translations [MSL SS 1]
- Šarru or "Group Vocabulary 3", seemingly an expansion of Malku = šarru [CT XVIII, pl. 29-30, CT 51, 168 (Note: C. B. F. Walker, ed. (1972). Cuneiform texts from Babylonian tablets in the British Museum, Part 51. British Museum. No. 168)]
- šaššu = ḫurāṣu, synonym list, an explicit version of Malku = šarru [CT XVIII pl. 11-14]
- Table of Measures
- Tin.tir = Babylon, a five tablet list of Sumero-Akkadian toponyms with about three quarters of its 300 lines of text extant
- tu-ta-ti, Old-Babylonian sign-list, with three syllables in u-a-i sequence, 3 versions
- ù = anāku, a neo-Babylonian grammatical text [MSL IV, 129]
- Ugu-mu, "my cranium", list of around 250 body parts ordered from head to foot, physiognomy and physiological conditions, in use from the Old Babylonian to the Kassite period[MSL IX]
- ummia = ummianu, "scholar", non-canonical profession list of the first Millennium
- Ur-e-a = nâqu [MSL II]
- Ur-Nanshe (not to be confused with the founder of the first dynasty of Lagash), a curricular personal name list from the Old Babylonian period
- uru.an.na = maštakal, the "Babylonian Pharmacopoeia", Assyrian four-tablet list of plants for medicinal purposes with directions for use in the third column, which remains unpublished
- Vessels and Garments, archaic thematic word-list
- Vocabulary S^{a}, sign list with Akkadian translations [MSL III]
- Vocabulary S^{b} [MSL III]
- Weidner god-list, Anum, a traditional god-list, the forerunner to An = Anum, with copies extant as far back as the Ur III and Isin-Larsa periods.until the first millennium BC, featuring 30 ancestors of Enlil
- Wood, archaic word-list
- Word list D, "grain", an archaic Sumerian word list

Generically identified Neo-Babylonian grammatical texts (NBGT) and Old-Babylonian grammatical texts (OBGT) have been omitted.
